= List of compositions by Elliott Carter =

This is a list of compositions by Elliott Carter.

== Ballet ==
- Pocahontas (1938–39)
- The Minotaur (1947), choreographed by George Balanchine and John Taras

== Opera ==
- What Next? (opera in one act; libretto by Paul Griffiths) (1997)

== Choral ==
- Tarantella for men's chorus and two pianos (1937)
- Let's Be Gay for women's chorus and two pianos (1937)
- Harvest Home for a cappella choir (1937)
- To Music for a cappella choir (1937)
- Heart Not So Heavy for a cappella choir (1939)
- The Defense of Corinth for speaker, men's chorus and piano four hands (1941)
- The Harmony of Morning for women's chorus and chamber orchestra (1944)
- Musicians Wrestle Everywhere for mixed chorus (SSATB) a capella or with strings (1945)
- Emblems for men's chorus and piano (1947)

== Concertante ==
- Double Concerto for Harpsichord and Piano with Two Chamber Orchestras (1959–61)
- Piano Concerto (1964–65)
- Oboe Concerto (1986–1987)
- Violin Concerto (1990)
- Clarinet Concerto (1996)
- Cello Concerto (2000)
- Boston Concerto (2002)
- Dialogues for piano and chamber orchestra (2003)
- Mosaic for harp and ensemble (2004)
- Soundings for piano and orchestra (2005)
- Horn Concerto (2006)
- Interventions for piano and orchestra (2007)
- Flute Concerto (2008)
- Concertino for bass clarinet and chamber orchestra (2009)
- Two Controversies and a Conversation for piano, percussion, and chamber orchestra (2010–11)
- Dialogues II for piano and chamber orchestra (2012)

== Orchestra ==
- Symphony No. 1 (1942, revised 1954)
- Holiday Overture (1944, revised 1961)
- Variations for Orchestra (1954–1955)
- Concerto for Orchestra (1969)
- A Symphony of Three Orchestras (1976)
- Three Occasions for Orchestra (1986–89)

1. "A Celebration of Some 150x100 Notes"
2. "Remembrance"
3. "Anniversary"

- Symphonia: sum fluxae pretium spei (1993–96)

1. Partita
2. Adagio Tenebroso
3. Allegro Scorrevole

- Three Illusions for Orchestra (2002–04)

1. "Micomicón"
2. "Fons Juventatis"
3. "More's Utopia"

- Sound Fields for string orchestra (2007)
- Instances for chamber orchestra (2012)

== Large ensemble ==
- Penthode for ensemble (1985)
- Asko Concerto for sixteen players (2000)
- Réflexions for ensemble (2004)
- Wind Rose for wind ensemble (2008)

== Chamber ==
- Pastoral for english horn and piano (1940, revised 1982, arrangements for clarinet, viola and alto saxophone exist)
- Canonic Suite for four alto saxophones or four clarinets (1939, published in 1945, revised in 1981)
- Elegy for viola and piano, also version for string quartet (1943, revised 1961)
- Cello Sonata (1948)
- Woodwind Quintet (1948)
- Eight Etudes and a Fantasy for wind quartet (1949)
- String Quartet No. 1 (1951)
- Sonata for flute, oboe, cello, and harpsichord (1952)
- String Quartet No. 2 (1959)
- Canon for 3 (1971)
- String Quartet No. 3 (1971)
- Brass Quintet (1974)
- Duo for violin and piano (1974)
- Birthday Fanfare for three trumpets, vibraphone, and glockenspiel (1978)
- Triple Duo (1983)
- Esprit rude/esprit doux for flute and clarinet (1984)
- Canon for 4 (1984)
- String Quartet No. 4 (1986)
- Enchanted Preludes for flute and cello (1988)
- Con leggerezza pensosa for clarinet, violin, and cello (1990)
- Quintet for piano and winds (1991)
- Trilogy for oboe and harp (1992)

1. Bariolage for harp
2. Inner Song for oboe
3. Immer Neu for oboe and harp

- Esprit rude/esprit doux II for flute, clarinet, and marimba (1994)
- Fragment I for string quartet (1994)
- String Quartet No. 5 (1995)
- Luimen for ensemble (1997)
- Quintet for piano and string quartet (1997)
- Fragment II for string quartet (1999)
- Oboe Quartet, for oboe, violin, viola, and cello (2001)
- Hiyoku for two clarinets (2001)
- Au Quai for bassoon and viola (2002)
- Call for two trumpets and horn (2003)
- Clarinet Quintet (2007)
- Tintinnabulation for percussion sextet (2008)
- Tre Duetti for violin and cello (2008, 2009)

1. Duettone
2. Adagio
3. Duettino

- Nine by Five for wind quintet (2009)
- Trije glasbeniki for flute, bass clarinet, and harp (2011)
- String Trio (2011)
- Double Trio for trumpet, trombone, percussion, piano, violin and cello (2011)
- Rigmarole for cello and bass clarinet (2011)
- Epigrams for violin, cello, and piano (2012)

== Voice ==
- My Love Is in a Light Attire for voice and piano (1928)
- Tell Me Where Is Fancy Bred for voice and guitar (1938)
- A Mirror on Which to Dwell for soprano and ensemble (1975)
- Syringa for mezzo-soprano, bass-baritone, guitar, and ensemble (1978)
- Three Poems of Robert Frost for baritone and ensemble (1942, orchestrated 1980)
- In Sleep, in Thunder for tenor and ensemble (1981)
- Of Challenge and of Love for soprano and piano (1994)
- Tempo e Tempi for soprano, oboe, clarinet, violin, and cello (1998–99)
- Of Rewaking for mezzo-soprano and orchestra (2002)
- In the Distances of Sleep for mezzo-soprano and chamber orchestra (2006)
- Mad Regales for six solo voices (2007)
- La Musique for solo voice (2007)
- Poems of Louis Zukofsky (2008) for mezzo-soprano and clarinet
- On Conversing with Paradise (2008) for baritone and chamber orchestra
- What Are Years (2009) for soprano and chamber orchestra
- A Sunbeam's Architecture (2010) for tenor and chamber orchestra
- Three Explorations (2011) for bass-baritone, winds, and brass
- The American Sublime (2011) for baritone and large ensemble

== Piano ==
- Piano Sonata (1945–46)
- Night Fantasies (1980)
- 90+ (1994)
- Two Diversions (1999)
- Retrouvailles (2000)
- Two Thoughts about the Piano (2005–06)

1. "Intermittences"
2. "Caténaires"

- Tri-Tribute (2007–08)

1. "Sistribute"
2. "Fratribute"
3. "Matribute"

== Solo instrumental ==
- Eight Pieces for Four Timpani (1949/66)
- Changes for guitar (1983)
- Scrivo in Vento for flute (1991)
- Gra for clarinet, also version for trombone (1994)
- Figment for cello (1994)
- A 6-letter Letter for English horn (1996)
- Shard for guitar (1997)
- Four Lauds for solo violin (1999, 1984, 2000, 1999)
1. "Statement – Remembering Aaron"
2. "Riconoscenza per Goffredo Petrassi"
3. "Rhapsodic Musings"
4. "Fantasy – Remembering Roger"
- Figment II for cello (2001)
- Steep Steps for bass clarinet (2001)
- Retracing for bassoon (2002)
- HBHH for oboe (2007)
- Figment III for contrabass (2007)
- Figment IV for viola (2007)
- Figment V for marimba (2009)
- Retracing II for horn (2009)
- Retracing III for trumpet (2009)
- Retracing IV for tuba (2011)
- Retracing V for trombone (2011)
- Mnemosyné for violin (2011)
- Figment VI for oboe (2011)
