= List of awards and nominations received by Elliott Carter =

Elliott Carter (1908–2012) was an American modernist composer. Over the course of his career, Carter received two Pulitzer Prizes, and was the first composer to receive the National Medal of Arts, "the highest award given to artists and arts patrons by the United States government." Carter was also the first American composer to receive from the Bayerische Akademie der Schönen Künste the Ernst von Siemens Music Prize, which has been called the "Nobel Prize of Music." Carter also had the rare honor of being inducted into the American Classical Music Hall of Fame during his lifetime.

== Awards for career and lifetime achievements ==
Year	Award	Sponsor
1965	Creative Arts Award	Brandeis University
1971	Gold Medal for Eminence in Music	American Academy of Arts and Letters
1978	Handel Medallion	City of New York
1981	Ernst von Siemens Music Prize	Bayerische Akademie der Schönen Künste and the Ernst von Siemens Music Foundation
1983	Edward MacDowell Medal	MacDowell Colony
1984	George Peabody Medal	The Peabody Institute of Johns Hopkins University
1985	National Medal of Arts	The President of the United States and the National Endowment for the Arts
1987	Commandeur of the Ordre des Arts et des Lettres	Government of France
1991	Commendatore of the Order of Merit of the Italian Republic	Government of Italy
1992	American Eagle Award	National Music Council
1995	Royal Philharmonic Society Gold Medal	Royal Philharmonic Society
1998	Inductee	American Classical Music Hall of Fame
2005	Thomas Jefferson Medal for Distinguished Achievement in the Arts, Humanities, and Social Sciences	American Philosophical Society
2009	Trustees Award at the 52nd Annual Grammy Awards	The Recording Academy
2012	Commandeur de la Légion d'honneur	Government of France

== Awards and nominations for specific compositions ==
Year	Composition	Award	Sponsor	Result
1939	To Music	Federal Music Project Choral Competition	Federal Music Project, Columbia Broadcasting System, Columbia Records	First Place
1940	Pocahontas	Juilliard Publication Award	The Juilliard School	Won
1945	Holiday Overture	Independent Concert Music Publisher's Contest	Judges included Serge Koussevitzky, Nicolai Berezowsky, and Aaron Copland	First Prize
1945	Canonic Suite	BMI Publication Prize	American Composers Alliance and Broadcast Music, Inc.	Won
1953	String Quartet No. 1	Concours international de quatuors à cordes	Liège, Belgium	Won* (Carter had to renounce the prize because the first performance of the quartet had already been given.)
1956	Sonata for Flute, Oboe, Cello and Harpsichord	Walter W. Naumburg Musical Foundation Award	Walter W. Naumburg Foundation	Won
1960	String Quartet No. 2	Pulitzer Prize for Music	The Pulitzer Prizes — Columbia University	Won
1960	String Quartet No. 2	New York Music Critics’ Circle Award	New York Music Critics’ Circle	Won
1961	String Quartet No. 2	UNESCO Prize for Outstanding Musical Work	UNESCO	Won
1961	Double Concerto	New York Music Critics’ Circle Award	New York Music Critics’ Circle	Won
1961	Double Concerto	Sibelius Award for Music	Harriett Cohen Foundation	Won
1962	String Quartet No. 2	Grammy Award for Best Contemporary Classical Composition at the 4th Annual Grammy Awards	The Recording Academy	Nominated
1973	String Quartet No. 3	Pulitzer Prize for Music	The Pulitzer Prizes — Columbia University	Won
1992	Oboe Concerto	Grammy Award for Best Contemporary Composition at the 34th Annual Grammy Awards	The Recording Academy	Nominated
1994	Violin Concerto	Grammy Award for Best Contemporary Composition at the 36th Annual Grammy Awards	The Recording Academy	Won
1996	"Adagio tenebroso"	Pulitzer Prize for Music	The Pulitzer Prizes — Columbia University	Finalist
1997	String Quartet No. 5	Royal Philharmonic Society Music Award for Chamber-Scale Composition	Royal Philharmonic Society	Won
1998	"Allegro scorrevole"	Lauréat du Prix de Composition Musicale	Jury led by Henri Dutilleux	Won
1998	"Allegro scorrevole"	Musical Composition Award	Prince Pierre Foundation	Won
1999	90+	Grammy Award for Best Classical Contemporary Composition at the 41st Annual Grammy Awards	The Recording Academy	Nominated
2005	Dialogues	Pulitzer Prize for Music	The Pulitzer Prizes — Columbia University	Finalist
2007	Boston Concerto	Grammy Award for Best Classical Contemporary Composition at the 49th Annual Grammy Awards	The Recording Academy	Nominated
2011	What Are Years	Musical Composition Award	Prince Pierre Foundation	Nominated

== Grants and fellowships ==
Year	Name of award	Sponsor
1945	Guggenheim Fellowship	John Simon Guggenheim Memorial Foundation
1950	Guggenheim Fellowship	John Simon Guggenheim Memorial Foundation
1950	Arts and Letters Award in Music	American Academy of Arts and Letters
1953	Rome Prize Fellowship	American Academy in Rome
