= Petrushka (ballet) =

1911 ballet by Igor Stravinsky

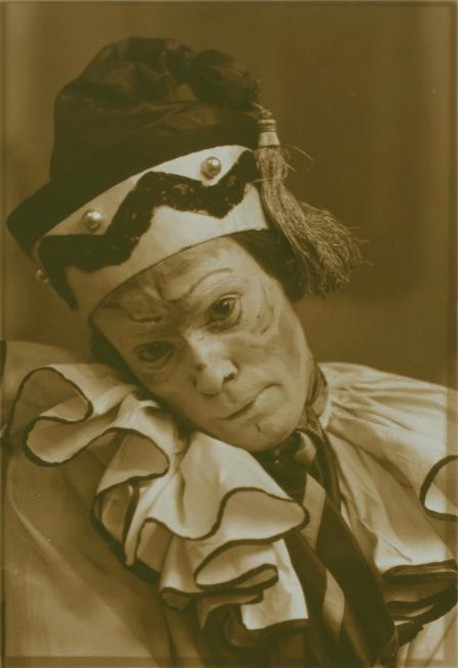
- Nijinsky as Petrushka
- Choreographer: Michel Fokine
- Music: Igor Stravinsky
- Libretto: Igor Stravinsky; Alexandre Benois
- Based on: Russian folk material
- Premiere: 13 June 1911; Théâtre du Châtelet; Paris
- Original ballet company: Ballets Russes
- Characters: Petrushka; The Ballerina; The Moor; The Charlatan
- Design: Alexandre Benois
- Setting: Admiralty Square; Saint Petersburg; Shrovetide, 1830
- Created for: Vaslav Nijinsky
- Genre: Ballet burlesque

Petrushka (French: Petrouchka; Russian: Петрушка) is a ballet by Russian composer Igor Stravinsky. It was written for the 1911 Paris season of Sergei Diaghilev's Ballets Russes company; the original choreography was by Michel Fokine and stage designs and costumes by Alexandre Benois, who assisted Stravinsky with the libretto. The ballet premiered at the Théâtre du Châtelet on 13 June 1911 with Vaslav Nijinsky as Petrushka, Tamara Karsavina as the lead ballerina, Alexander Orlov as the Moor, and Enrico Cecchetti as the charlatan.

Petrushka tells the story of the loves and jealousies of three puppets. They are brought to life by the Charlatan during the 1830 Shrovetide Fair (Maslenitsa) in Saint Petersburg. Petrushka is in love with the Ballerina, but she rejects him as she prefers the Moor. Petrushka is angry and hurt, and curses the Charlatan for bringing him into the world with only pain and suffering in his miserable life. Because of his anger, he challenges the Moor. The Moor, who is bigger and stronger than Petrushka, kills him with his scimitar. The crowd watching is horrified, and the Charlatan is called to the scene as well as a police officer. The Charlatan reminds everyone that Petrushka is nothing but a puppet made of straw and cloth, and that he has no real emotion nor 'life'. As the crowd disperses, the Charlatan is left alone onstage. At that moment, Petrushka's ghost rises above the puppet theatre as night falls. He shakes his fist and thumbs his nose at the Charlatan, making him flee, terrified. Petrushka then collapses in a second death.

Petrushka brings music, dance, and design together in a unified whole. It is one of the most popular of the Ballets Russes productions. It is usually performed today with the original designs and choreography. Grace Robert wrote in 1946, "Although more than thirty years have elapsed since Petrushka was first performed, its position as one of the greatest ballets remains unassailed. Its perfect fusion of music, choreography, and décor and its theme—the timeless tragedy of the human spirit—unite to make its appeal universal".

== Russian puppets ==
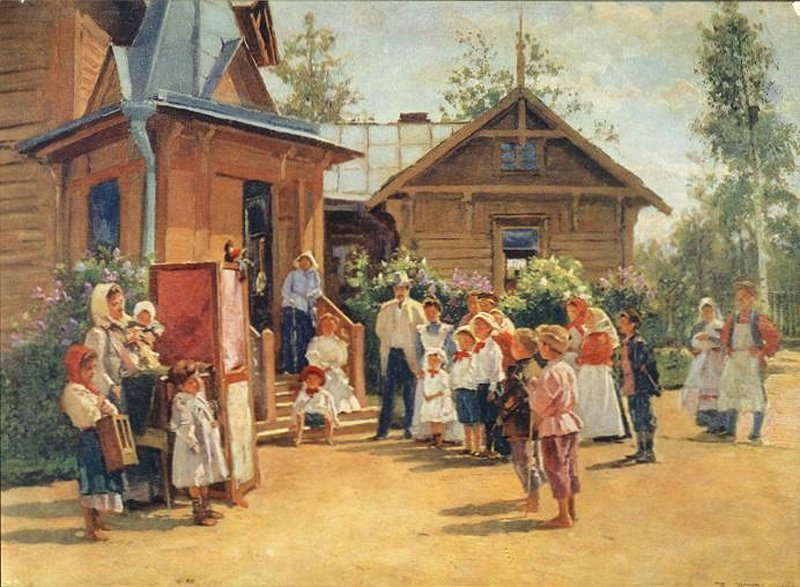
Petrushka performance in a Russian village, 1908

Petrushka is a puppet. He is a character known across Europe under different names: Punch in England, Polichinelle in France, Pulcinella in Italy, Kasperle in Germany, and Petrushka in Russia. He is a trickster, rebel, and wife-beater. He enforces moral justice with a wooden club, speaks in a high-pitched, squeaky voice, and argues with the devil. His plays are formulaic and subversive. They repeat key scenes from one play to another. The plays usually end with a dog, a policeman, or the devil dragging him away.

Empress Anna Ivanovna brought marionettes to Russia in the 18th century. They were an amusement for the aristocracy. Rod puppets were an Asian import. They performed religious plays, mostly at Christmas. But Petrushka was a hand puppet. He was loved by the common people. He performed in street theatres and other open-air venues in small portable booths or behind screens that could be easily assembled and disassembled. After the Russian Revolution, Soviet authorities forced Petrushka indoors to be better monitor his subversiveness.

== Composition ==
Igor Stravinsky with Vaslav Nijinsky in costume for Petrushka.

The gestation of Petrushka was not straightforward. While completing The Firebird in the spring of 1910, Stravinsky had a "vision" of a solemn pagan rite: sage elders, seated in a circle, watching a young girl dance herself to death. They were sacrificing her to propitiate the god of Spring. Such was the theme of The Rite of Spring. Immediately after the stunning success of The Firebird in June 1910, Diaghilev approached Stravinsky about a new ballet; the composer proposed the Rite theme. Diaghilev accepted in principle and suggested that the premiere might take place during the Paris season of the Ballets Russes in the spring of 1912.

At the end of September 1910, Diaghilev visited Stravinsky in Clarens, Switzerland, where he was living at the time. Expecting to discuss the new ballet, Diaghilev was astonished to find Stravinsky hard at work on a different project. He had had another vision: "I saw a man in evening dress, with long hair, the musician or poet of the romantic tradition. He placed several heteroclite objects on the keyboard and rolled them up and down. At this the orchestra exploded with the most vehement protestations – hammer blows, in fact".

Later, Stravinsky wrote: "In composing the music, I had in my mind a distinct picture of a puppet, suddenly endowed with life, exasperating the patience of the orchestra with diabolical cascades of arpeggios. The orchestra in turn retaliates with menacing trumpet blasts." Although Stravinsky had conceived the music as a pure concert work—a Konzertstück—Diaghilev realized its theatrical potential. The notion of a puppet put Diaghilev in mind of Petrushka, the Russian version of Punch and Judy puppetry that had formed a traditional part of the pre-Lenten Carnival festivities in 1830s St. Petersburg.

Stravinsky composed the music during the winter of 1910–11 for Diaghilev's Ballets Russes. It was premièred in Paris at the Théâtre du Châtelet on 13 June 1911 with the Orchestre Colonne under conductor Pierre Monteux, choreography by Michel Fokine, and sets by Alexandre Benois. The title role was danced by Vaslav Nijinsky. The work is characterized by the so-called Petrushka chord (consisting of C major and F♯ major triads played together), a bitonal device heralding the main character.

== Instrumentation ==
=== 1911 original version ===
This is scored as follows:

Woodwind
4 flutes (3rd and 4th doubling piccolo)
4 oboes (4th doubling cor anglais)
4 clarinets in B♭ (4th doubling bass clarinet in B♭)
4 bassoons (4th doubling contrabassoon)

Brass
4 horns in F
2 trumpets in B♭ and A (1st doubling piccolo trumpet in D)
2 cornets in B♭ and A
3 trombones
1 tuba

Percussion
Timpani

Bass drum
Cymbals
2 snare drums (one offstage)
Tambourine (tambour de basque)
Tenor drum (tambourin) (offstage)
Triangle
Tamtam

Glockenspiel
Xylophone
Piano
Celesta (2- and 4-hand)
2 harps

Strings

=== 1946 revised version ===
Stravinsky's 1946 version, published in 1947, is for a smaller orchestra.

Woodwind
3 flutes (3rd doubling piccolo)
2 oboes
1 cor anglais
3 clarinets in B♭ (3rd doubling bass clarinet in B♭)
2 bassoons
1 contrabassoon

Brass
4 horns in F
3 trumpets in B♭ and C
3 trombones
1 tuba

Percussion
Timpani
Bass drum
Cymbals
Snare drum
Tambourine
Triangle
Tamtam
Xylophone
Piano
Celesta
Harp

Strings

== Libretto and story ==
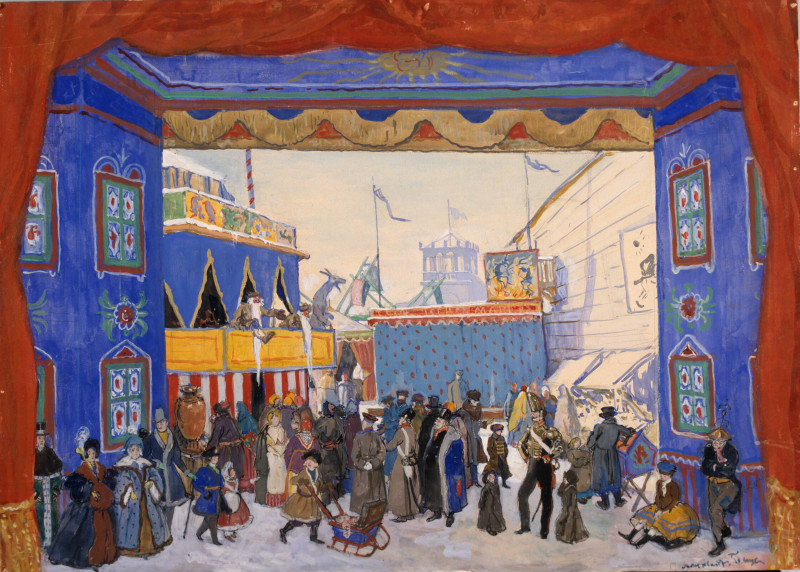
The Shrovetide Fair by Benois

While the original idea was Stravinsky's, Alexandre Benois provided the ethnographic details of the Shrovetide Fair and the traditions of the Russian puppet theater. And although Petrushka is frequently cited as an example of the complete integration of libretto, music, choreography, and scenic design, Stravinsky had written much of the music (chiefly the second tableau) before Benois became involved with the project.

=== First tableau: The Shrovetide Fair ===
Petrushka begins with a festive orchestral introduction based, in part, on historical Russian street-hawkers' cries. The curtain rises to reveal St. Petersburg's Admiralty Square during the 1830s. The stage set (also by Benois) depicts several hucksters' booths, a Ferris wheel, a carousel, and (upstage center) a puppet theater. A crowd has gathered for the Shrovetide Fair (known as Maslenitsa), the carnival (analogous to Mardi Gras) preceding Lent.

In Fokine's original choreography, a group of Drunken Revelers emerges from the crowd, dancing to Stravinsky's adaptation of the folk-tune "Song of the Volochobniki" ("Dalalin' Dalalin'" from Rimsky-Korsakov Op. 24 No. 47).

Suddenly, the festive music is interrupted by strident brass announcing the appearance of the Master of Ceremonies on the balcony of his booth. The equivalent of a carnival "barker", he boasts of the attractions to be seen within.

The squeaks of a street-organ are heard (clarinets and flutes) as an Organ-Grinder and Dancing Girl emerge from the crowd, which at first pays little attention as the barker continues to shout. The Dancer moves downstage and begins to dance to another Russian folk song, "Toward Evening, in Rainy Autumn", while playing the triangle.

At the other end of the stage, a second Dancing Girl appears, accompanied by a music box (suggested in the orchestra by the celesta). The two Dancing Girls compete for the crowd's attention to the strains of a ribald French music-hall song about a woman with a wooden leg: "Une Jambe de bois". Both tunes are repeated.

The Drunken Revelers return (again to the "Song of the Volochobniki") interrupted several times by the Barker's boasts. The street-hawkers' cries of the very opening are heard once more.

Suddenly, two drummers summon the crowd to the puppet theater with deafening drumrolls. The Magician (sometimes called the "Charlatan") appears to mystical groans from the bassoon and contrabassoon. When he has everyone's attention, he produces a flute and begins to play a long, improvisatory melody. The curtain of the puppet theater rises to reveal three puppets hanging on the wall: the Moor, the Ballerina, and Petrushka. When the Magician touches them with his flute (to chirps in the orchestra), they seem to awaken.

The astonished crowd watches as, with a wave of the Magician's hand, the three puppets begin a vigorous Russian Dance (based on two more Russian folk-tunes: "A Linden Tree Is in the Field" and "Song for St. John's Eve").

In Fokine's choreography, they first begin to move their feet (while still hanging on the wall), then burst forth from the puppet theater into the midst of the crowd. The Moor (resplendent in turban and exaggerated pantaloons) is swashbuckling. The Ballerina dances perpetually en pointe. Petrushka, on the other hand, is wooden and awkward. It becomes apparent that Petrushka loves the Ballerina, but she has eyes only for the Moor. The Magician calls the dance to a halt; the curtain falls rapidly.

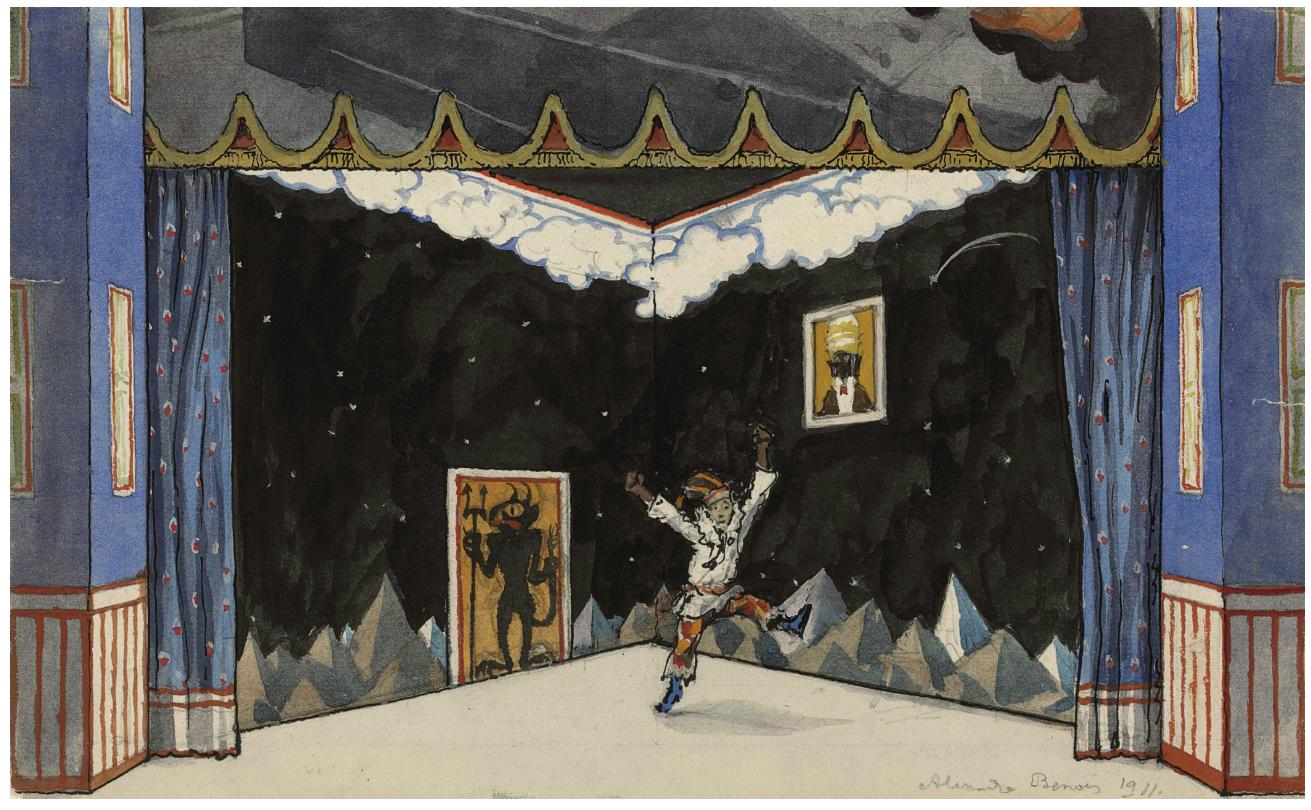
Petrushka's Room by Alexandre Benois

=== Second tableau: Petrushka's Room ===
Although Petrushka's room is inside the puppet theater, Benois's design is fantastical, portraying the night sky with stars and a half-moon, abstract icebergs (or snow-capped mountains), and a prominent portrait of the Magician.

Drumrolls announce the beginning of the second tableau. Without an Introduction, the music begins menacingly. "A foot kicks him onstage; Petrushka falls..."

As Petrushka gradually pulls himself together, we hear a strange arpeggio in the clarinets: the "Petrushka chord" (consisting of juxtaposed triads of C major and F♯ major). Petrushka gets to his feet (shakily) to the accompaniment of waves of arpeggios from the piano (revealing the music's origins in Stravinsky's Konzertstück). The Petrushka Chord returns, now violently scored for trumpets, marked in the score "Petrushka's Curses", directed at the portrait of the Magician.

The music turns lyrical as Petrushka falls to his knees and mimes (in turn) his self-pity, love for the Ballerina, and hatred of the Magician.

The Ballerina (still en pointe) sneaks into Petrushka's room, at first unnoticed. As soon as Petrushka sees her, he begins a manic, athletic display of leaps and frantic gestures (although he was barely able to stand before she arrived). Frightened by his exuberance, the Ballerina flees. Petrushka falls to the floor to the mocking of the clarinets.

Another passage of arpeggios for piano grows into a second round of curses directed at the Magician, again represented musically by the Petrushka Chord, this time scored for full orchestra.

For a moment, Petrushka peers out of his room at the crowd assembled in Admiralty Square (Stravinsky provides a brief reference to the "crowd music" of the first tableau). Then he collapses as we hear a taunting reprise of the clarinets playing the Petrushka Chord followed by an odd trumpet call signalling "blackout, curtain."

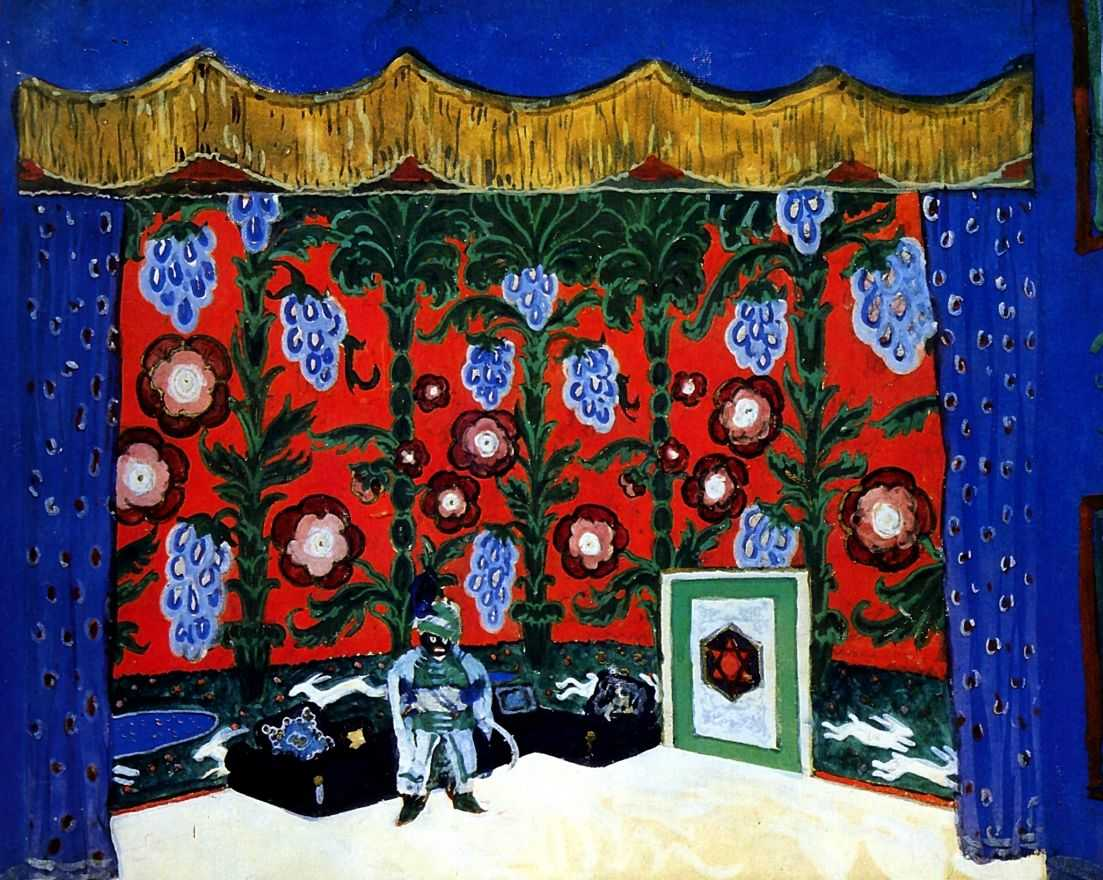
The Moor's Room by Benois

=== Third tableau: The Moor's Room ===
As before, drumrolls link the third tableau to its predecessor (in the 1911 score, Stravinsky directs that this drumroll be omitted in concert performance). In sharp contrast to the darkness of Petrushka's Cell, the brilliant colors of Benois's design for the Moor's Room evoke a romanticized desert: palm trees, exotic flowers, sand.

In Fokine's choreography, the Moor reclines on a divan playing with a coconut. He then jumps to his feet and attempts to cut it with his scimitar. When he fails he believes that the coconut must be a god and proceeds to pray to it.

The Charlatan places the Ballerina in the Moor's room. She is attracted to the handsome Moor, plays a saucy tune on a toy trumpet (represented by a cornet in the original 1911 orchestration), then dances a waltz with him (the themes taken from Joseph Lanner's Op. 165 No. 1 and Op. 200 No. 1).

Petrushka finally breaks free from his cell and interrupts the seduction of the Ballerina. He attacks the Moor but soon realizes he is too small and weak. The Moor beats Petrushka. The ballerina faints. Petrushka flees for his life, with the Moor chasing him, and escapes from the room.

=== Fourth tableau: The Shrovetide Fair (Toward Evening) ===
The fourth and final scene returns to the carnival. Some time has passed; it is now early evening. The orchestra introduces a chain of colourful dances as a series of apparently unrelated characters come and go onstage as snow begins to fall. The first and most prominent is the Wet-Nurses' Dance, performed to the tune of the folk song "Down the Petersky Road". Then comes a peasant with his dancing bear, followed by a group of a gypsies, coachmen, grooms, and masqueraders.

As the merrymaking reaches its peak, a cry is heard from the puppet-theater. Petrushka suddenly runs across the scene, followed by the Moor in hot pursuit brandishing his sword, and the terrified Ballerina chasing after the Moor, fearful of what he might do. The crowd is horrified when the Moor catches Petrushka and slays him with a single stroke of his blade.

The police question the Charlatan. The Charlatan seeks to restore calm by holding the "corpse" above his head and shaking it to remind everyone that Petrushka is but a puppet.

As night falls and the crowd disperses, the Charlatan leaves, carrying Petrushka's limp body. Suddenly, Petrushka's ghost appears on the little theatre's roof, his cry now angry defiance. Petrushka's spirit thumbs its nose at his tormentor from beyond the wood and straw of his carcass.

Now completely alone, the Charlatan is terrified by Petrushka's leering ghost. He runs away, allowing himself a single frightened glance over his shoulder. The scene is hushed, leaving the audience to wonder who is "real" and who is not.

== Structure ==
The work is divided into four tableaux (scenes). The score further indicates the following episodes:

- First tableau: The Shrovetide Fair
1. [Introduction]
2. A group of Drunken Revelers passes, dancing
3. The Master of Ceremonies entertains the Crowd from his booth above
4. An Organ-Grinder appears in the Crowd with a [woman] Dancer
5. The Organ-Grinder begins to play
6. The Dancer dances, beating time on the triangle
7. At the other end of the stage a Music Box plays, another [woman] Dancer dancing around it.
8. The first Dancer plays the triangle again
9. The Organ and Music Box stop playing; the Master of Ceremonies resumes his pitch
10. The Merry Group returns
11. Two Drummers, stepping up in front of the Little Theater, attract the attention of the Crowd by their drumrolls
12. At the front of [i.e. from inside] the Little Theater appears the Old Magician.
13. The Magic Trick
  1. The Magician plays the flute
  2. The curtain of the Little Theater opens and the Crowd sees three puppets: Petrushka (Guignol), a Moor, and a Ballerina
  3. The Magician brings them to life by touching them lightly with his flute.
14. Russian Dance
  1. Petrushka, the Moor, and the Ballerina suddenly begin to dance, to the great astonishment of the Crowd
  2. Darkness, the Curtain falls
- Second tableau: Petrushka's Room
1. As the Curtain rises, the door to Petrushka's room opens suddenly; a foot kicks him onstage; Petrushka falls and the door closes again behind him
2. Petrushka's curses
3. The Ballerina enters
4. The Ballerina leaves
5. Petrushka's despair
6. Darkness. Curtain.
- Third tableau: The Moor's Room
1. [Introduction]
2. The Moor dances
3. Appearance of the Ballerina
4. Dance of the Ballerina (cornet in hand)
5. Waltz (the Ballerina and the Moor)
6. The Moor and the Ballerina prick up their ears
7. Appearance of Petrushka
8. The Fight between the Moor and Petrushka. The Ballerina faints.
9. The Moor throws Petrushka Out. Darkness. Curtain.
- Fourth tableau: The Shrovetide Fair (Toward Evening)
1. [Introduction]
2. The Wet-Nurses' Dance
3. A Peasant enters with a Bear. Everyone scatters.
4. The Peasant plays the pipe. The Bear walks on his hind feet.
5. The Peasant and the Bear leave.
6. A Reveling Merchant and two Gypsy Women Enter. He irresponsibly amuses himself by throwing bank notes to the Crowd.
7. The Gypsy Women dance. The Merchant plays the accordion.
8. The Merchant and the Gypsies leave
9. Dance of the Coachmen and the Grooms
  1. The Wet-Nurses dance with the Coachmen and the Grooms
10. The Mummers
  1. The Devil (Mummer) induces the Crowd to frolic with him
  2. Buffoonery of the Mummers (Goat and Pig)
  3. The Mummers and the Maskers dance
  4. The rest of the Crowd joins in the Mummers' Dance
  5. The Crowd continues to dance without taking notice of the cries coming from the Little Theater.
11. The dances break off. Petrushka dashes from the Little Theater, pursued by the Moor, whom the Ballerina tries to restrain.
12. The furious Moor seizes him and strikes him with his saber.
13. Petrushka falls, his head broken
14. A crowd forms around Petrushka
15. He dies, still moaning.
16. A Policeman is sent to look for the Magician
17. The Magician arrives
18. He picks up Petrushka's corpse, shaking it.
19. The Crowd disperses.
20. The Magician remains alone on stage. He drags Petrushka's corpse toward the Little Theater.
21. Above the Little Theater appears the Ghost of Petrushka, menacing, thumbing his nose at the Magician.
22. The terrified Magician lets the Puppet-Petrushka drop from his hands, and exits quickly, casting frightened glances over his shoulder.
23. Curtain

== Other versions ==
During rehearsals for the 1911 premiere, Stravinsky and other pianists including Russian composer Nikolai Tcherepnin used a piano four-hand version of the score. This has never been published, although Paul Jacobs and Ursula Oppens, among other pianists, have played it in concert.

In 1921, Stravinsky created a virtuosic and celebrated piano arrangement for Arthur Rubinstein, Trois mouvements de Petrouchka, which the composer admitted he could not play himself, for want of adequate left-hand technique.

Herbert Stothart, who composed the score for The Wizard of Oz, was visited by Stravinsky at MGM in 1936. Stravinsky gave Stothart a personal, signed copy of Petrushka. As the main characters in the film run through the Deadly Poppy Field, the opening to the fourth tableau can be heard briefly.

In 1946, Stravinsky thinned the ballet's scoring, in part because the original was not covered everywhere by copyright. The rapid continuous timpani and snare-drum notes that link each scene, optional in 1911, are compulsory in this version, published in 1947. The Ballerina's tune is assigned to a trumpet in 1946 in place of a cornet, and the 1946 version provides an optional fff (fortississimo) near the piano conclusion. Stravinsky also removed some difficult metric modulations in the first tableau.

Separately Stravinsky created a suite for concert performance, an almost complete version of the ballet, cutting the last three sections and adding a loud ending in place of the ballet's quiet one.

In 1956, an animated version of the ballet appeared as part of NBC's Sol Hurok Music Hour. It was conducted by Stravinsky and was the first such collaboration. Directed by animator John David Wilson with Fine Arts Films, it has been noted as the first animated special ever to air on television.

Frank Zappa's 1960s iteration of his band the Mothers of Invention often quoted Petrushka either as a standalone performance or during longer performances of the song "King Kong".

In 1968, Maddalena Fagandini directed a stop motion version of Petrushka, with animation by Bura and Hardwick, which was broadcast by the BBC.

Basil Twist debuted his puppetry version of Petrushka at Lincoln Center in 2001; it was performed as well at New York City Center's 2009 Fall for Dance Festival.

A full transcription of the 1911 version for symphonic wind ensemble in the original key was made by Don Patterson.

Themes from Petrushka are played on banjo in the track "Russian Folk Themes and Yodel" on Pete Seeger's album Goofing-Off Suite, released in 1955 on Folkways Records.

In the 2022 film Goodbye, Petrushka, Petrushka is a major plot element.

== Notable recordings ==
- Leopold Stokowski conducting the Philadelphia Orchestra, studio recording from 1937, Victor; reissued by Pearl (1911 version) (mono)
- Arturo Toscanini conducting the NBC Symphony Orchestra, live performance from 1940, RCA (1911 concert suite) (mono)
- Ferenc Fricsay conducting the RIAS Symphony Orchestra, live performance from 1953, Deutsche Grammophon, (1947 concert suite) (mono)
- Ernest Ansermet conducting the Orchestre de la Suisse Romande, studio recording from 1950 (London LLP 130) and 1957, Decca, (1911 version)
- Pierre Monteux conducting the Boston Symphony Orchestra, studio recording from 1959, RCA (1911 version)
- Eugene Goossens conducting the London Symphony Orchestra, studio Walthamstow Assembly Hall September 1959, 35mm film master Everest (1911 "original" version)
- Igor Stravinsky conducting the Columbia Symphony Orchestra, studio recording from 1961, Sony (1947 version)
- Karel Ančerl conducting the Czech Philharmonic, studio recording from 1962, Supraphon (1947 version)
- Antal Doráti conducting the Minneapolis Symphony Orchestra, studio recording from 1962, Mercury (1947 version)
- Leonard Bernstein conducting the New York Philharmonic, studio recording from 1969, Sony Classical (1947 version)
- Seiji Ozawa conducting the Boston Symphony Orchestra, studio recording from 1970, RCA (1947 version)
- Pierre Boulez conducting the New York Philharmonic, studio recording from 1971, Sony (1911 version)
- Kirill Kondrashin conducting the Concertgebouw Orchestra, live performance from 1973, Philips (1947 version)
- Bernard Haitink conducting the London Philharmonic Orchestra, studio recording from 1973, Philips (1911 version)
- Sir Colin Davis conducting the Concertgebouw Orchestra, studio recording from 1977, Philips (1947 version)
- Claudio Abbado conducting the London Symphony Orchestra, studio recording from 1980, Deutsche Grammophon (1947 version mislabeled as 1911)
- Charles Dutoit conducting the Montreal Symphony Orchestra, studio recording from 1987, Decca (1911 version)
- Riccardo Chailly conducting the Royal Concertgebouw Orchestra, studio recording from 1995, London (1947 version)
- Robert Craft conducting the Philharmonia Orchestra, studio recording from 1997, Abbey Road Studios, London, Naxos (1947 version)
- Lorin Maazel conducting the Wiener Philharmoniker in studio sessions March 23–26, 1998, RCA (1911 version)
- Seiji Ozawa conducting the Boston Symphony Orchestra, studio recording from 1999, RCA (1947 version)
- Paavo Järvi conducting the Cincinnati Symphony Orchestra, recording in Cincinnati Music Hall from 2002, Telarc (1947 version)
- Andrew Litton conducting the Bergen Philharmonic Orchestra, recording in Grieghallen, Bergen, Norway from 2008, BIS Records SACD (1911 version)
- Sir Simon Rattle conducting the London Symphony Orchestra, recording in Barbican Centre from 2017, (1947 version)

== Notes ==
=== Bibliography ===
- Beumers, Birgit. 2005. Pop Culture Russia!: Media, Arts, and Lifestyle. Popular Culture in the Contemporary World. Santa Barbara: ABC-CLIO. ISBN 978-1-85109-459-2 (cloth); ISBN 978-1-85109-464-6 (pbk).
- Beaumont, Cyril W. (1937). "Petrushka". Complete Book of Ballets: A Guide to the Principal Ballets of the Nineteenth and Twentieth Centuries. London: Putnam.
- Daubney, Kate; Rosar, William (2001). "Stothart, Herbert". Oxford Music Online. Oxford University Press. doi:10.1093/gmo/9781561592630.article.26873. ISBN 978-1-56159-263-0.
- Peyser, Joan (1999). To Boulez and Beyond: Music in Europe Since The Rite of Spring. Billboard Books. ISBN 978-0-8230-7875-2.
- Robert, Grace. (1946). The Borzoi Book of Ballets. New York: Alfred A. Knopf.
- Jacobs, Paul (2008). Stravinsky: Music for Four Hands. Jacobs & Oppens. New York: Nonesuch Records & Arbiter of Cultural Traditions. Archived from the original on March 2, 2012.
- Stravinsky, Igor. [1912]. Petrushka, orchestral score. Paris: Éditions russes de musique, plate R.M.V. 348. Reprinted Mineola, New York: Dover Publications, 1988. Retrieved 06-20-2013.
- Stravinsky, Igor. 1936. Autobiography. New York: Simon and Schuster.
- Stravinsky, Vera, and Robert Craft. 1978. Stravinsky in Pictures and Documents. New York: Simon and Schuster.
- Walsh, Stephen. 2001. "Stravinsky, Igor". The New Grove Dictionary of Music and Musicians, second edition, edited by Stanley Sadie and John Tyrrell. London: Macmillan.
