= Paul Jacobs (pianist) =

American pianist (1930–1983)

Album cover for Paul Jacobs in Recital (Arbiter CD 130)

Paul Jacobs (June 22, 1930 – September 25, 1983) was an American pianist. He was best known for his performances of twentieth-century music but also gained wide recognition for his work with early keyboards, performing frequently with Baroque ensembles.

== Biography ==
=== Education ===
Paul Jacobs was born in New York City and attended PS 95 and DeWitt Clinton High School in the Bronx and studied at the Juilliard School, where his teacher was Ernest Hutcheson. He became a soloist with Robert Craft's Chamber Arts Society and played with the Composer's Forum. He made his official New York debut in 1951. Reviewing that concert, Ross Parmenter described him in The New York Times as 'a young man of individual tastes with an experimental approach to the keyboard that he already has mastered.'

=== Europe in the 1950s ===
He moved to France after his graduation in 1951. There he began his long association with Pierre Boulez, playing frequently in his Domaine musical concerts, which introduced many of the key works of the early twentieth-century to post-war Paris. At a single concert in 1954, which must have lasted close to five hours and also included works by Stravinsky, Debussy and Varèse, Jacobs contributed chamber music by Berg, Webern and Bartók and gave the première of a new work by Michel Philippot. In a 1958 Domaine concert he played a work written for him by the 21-year-old Richard Rodney Bennett, his Cycle 2 for Paul Jacobs.

He acted as rehearsal pianist for the incidental music which Boulez wrote for Jean-Louis Barrault's production of the Oresteia in 1955. Jacobs later said that meeting Boulez had put an end to his own composing ambitions: 'I just gave it up. I wouldn't have dared show anything of mine to Boulez.'

During his time in Europe he appeared as soloist with the Orchestre National de Paris and the Cologne Orchestra and made many radio broadcasts. He played for the International Society for Contemporary Music in Italy and at the International Vacation Courses for new music at Darmstadt. For the 1957 course, Wolfgang Steinecke invited him to give the European première of Stockhausen's Klavierstück XI, a key work in the development of 'controlled chance' and this may have been at the composer's suggestion.

Like many musicians with a commitment to new music, his existence was frugal. For broadcasts he would be paid as little as $5, which went up to $25 when he played the premiere of the Henze Piano Concerto 'because of the special difficulty of the piece'. He lived in a hotel 'with a window facing a wall so that I had to go outside to see what the weather was. There was room only for a bed and a piano and a little alcohol burner to make stew on.' Around this time he became a close friend of the French painter Bernard Saby, whom he described as an important influence.

=== New York 1960-83 ===
Tired of trying to live on $500 a year, he returned to New York in 1960 with the assistance of Aaron Copland who arranged for some teaching work at Tanglewood. In November and December 1961 he gave a pair of Town Hall recitals, mixing Boulez and Copland, Stockhausen and Debussy. The New York Times described them as 'just about overwhelming ... make no mistake, Mr Jacobs is a virtuoso even in the traditional sense'. He made his recital debut as a harpsichordist at Carnegie Hall in February 1966 with a programme which included Bach, Haydn, and de Falla's Harpsichord Concerto.

During the 1960s and 1970s he continued to give solo recitals and played frequently for the Chamber Music Society of Lincoln Center. He performed with the Fromm Fellowship Players at Tanglewood, Gunther Schuller's Contemporary Innovations and Arthur Weisberg's Contemporary Chamber Ensemble. He taught at Tanglewood and at the Mannes and Manhattan music schools in New York. For the last fifteen years of his life he was Associate Professor of Music at Brooklyn College of the City University of New York.

Jacobs was the New York Philharmonic's official pianist (from 1961) and harpsichordist (from 1974) until his death. He held the post during the tenure of three music directors. He can be heard as soloist in Bernstein's recording of Messiaen's Trois petites liturgies and both Boulez's and Mehta's recordings of Stravinsky's Petrushka. He is the pianist in the NYPO recording of Gershwin's Rhapsody in Blue (conducted by Mehta) used by Woody Allen in the opening of his film Manhattan.

He had a long collaboration with the American composer Elliott Carter, recording most of Carter's solo piano music and ensemble works with keyboard, including the Double Concerto for Harpsichord and Piano, With Two Chamber Orchestras, the Cello Sonata and the Sonata for Flute, Oboe, Cello and Harpsichord. He was one of the four American pianists who commissioned Carter's large-scale solo piano work Night Fantasies (1978–80), the others being Charles Rosen, Gilbert Kalish and Ursula Oppens (with whom Jacobs often performed two-piano works). It was Jacobs who organised the consortium after he and Oppens realised that Carter's previous reluctance to accept a commission for a new solo piano work from one pianist might have been born out of a desire not to offend others. He gave the New York premiere of the work in November 1981. All of Jacobs's Carter recordings were re-issued by Nonesuch in 2009 as part of a Carter retrospective set.

He also gave first performances of music by George Crumb, Berio, Henze, Messiaen and Sessions and commissioned Frederic Rzewski's Four North American Ballads in 1979. Aaron Copland called him 'more than a pianist. He brings to his piano a passion for the contemporary and a breadth of musical and general culture such as is rare.'

=== Death ===
He died of an AIDS-related illness in 1983, one of the first prominent artists to succumb to the disease. At his funeral on September 27, 1983, Elliott Carter delivered a eulogy, recalling his friendship and collaboration with Jacobs dating back to the mid-1950s. A memorial concert held at New York's Symphony Space on February 24, 1984 was attended by some of America's most eminent composers and interpreters. The music ranged from Josquin to two new compositions dedicated to Jacobs (by William Bolcom and David Schiff). Pierre Boulez wrote in the programme: 'twentieth-century music owes him thanks for all the talent he generously put at its disposal.'

Bolcom included a lament for Jacobs as the slow movement of his 1983 Violin Concerto and dedicated his Pulitzer Prize-winning 12 New Etudes to him. He had begun to compose them for Jacobs in 1977 and completed them after his death. Jacobs was also one of the friends and colleagues commemorated by John Corigliano in his Symphony No. 1.

== Repertoire and style ==
Although Jacobs was associated with some of the most challenging music of the modernist tradition, his colleague Gilbert Kalish stressed that 'far from being an "intellectual performer", Paul was the most intuitive and spontaneous kind of musician. Few who heard him play will ever forget the splashing brilliance of his runs, the glitter of his attacks, his aristocratic sense of rhythm and phrasing ... I have never seen anyone play the piano with such feline grace and alertness.'

Of his commitment to contemporary music, Jacobs himself said this: 'I feel absolutely perplexed at times why performers don't feel at home with the music of their own century. The music that hit me first when I was an adolescent was the music of the beginning of the century, all the way up through Stravinsky, even in his later years. It just doesn't pose any stylistic problems, it's as easy to speak as if you were reading the newspaper, I just know what to do with it.'

Perhaps the composer with whom he is now most closely associated is Debussy, most of whose major piano works he recorded, including the Préludes, Etudes, Images and Estampes. His was one of the first recordings of Debussy's three 1894 Images, which had only recently been published. Writing of a reissue of one of these recordings in 2002, the Gramophone commented: 'Hearing Paul Jacobs ... is a sharp and salutary reminder of a novel‚ vigorous and superbly uncluttered view of Debussy ... one which stresses the composer's revolutionary fervour. The power and focus of these performances remain astonishing with opalescent mists and hazes burnt away to reveal a corruscating wit and vitality. There is absolutely nothing here of the decadent and lethargic man of popular imagination. Throughout‚ Jacobs' commitment to every note of Debussy's phantasmagoric visions is total. All his recordings should be reissued.'

== Discography ==
=== Early recordings ===
Jacobs began his recording career in Europe in the 1950s. One of his first records (in 1953) was of Beethoven's Second Piano Concerto with the Paris Radio Symphony Orchestra conducted by René Leibowitz, coupled with Leibowitz's own realisation of Beethoven's Piano Concerto in E flat major of 1784, written when Beethoven was 14 and of which only the piano part survives. In Paris in 1956 he gave the first complete performance in a single concert of all of Schoenberg's piano music, going on to record it for the Véga label. He also acted as producer on recordings conducted by René Leibowitz, including the first LP recording of Schoenberg's Gurrelieder. He was the harpsichord soloist in the 1968 Columbia recording of the Carter Double Concerto with Charles Rosen (piano) and the English Chamber Orchestra, conducted by Frederick Prausnitz, and played on the 1970 CRI recording of Morton Feldman's The Viola in My Life.

=== Nonesuch LPs ===
His reputation as a recording artist rests largely on a series of LPs he made for the American Nonesuch label, for most of which he wrote a wide-ranging accompanying essay. Beginning in 1968 and 1973 with chamber and concertante works by Carter, from 1976 onwards he concentrated on the solo and duet repertoire. Most have remained available over the years thanks to CD reissues by Nonesuch and, later, by Warner. The small American label Arbiter has also done much to keep Jacobs' recorded legacy before the public. In 2008 Arbiter released a two-CD set of the Stravinsky two piano / four-hand repertoire (with Ursula Oppens), coupled with some previously unpublished live recordings by Jacobs. They have also reissued his recordings of the piano music of Busoni, whom Jacobs considered 'the great underrated master of the twentieth century'.

The list of the Nonesuch LPs is in chronological order, with CD reissues under each entry.

- Carter: Chamber Music
  - Sonata for Flute, Oboe, Cello and Harpsichord (with Harvey Sollberger, flute; Charles Kuskin, oboe; Fred Sherry, cello)
  - Sonata for Cello and Piano (with Joel Krosnick, cello)
  - Recorded August 1968, Rutgers Presbyterian Church, New York, under the supervision of the composer
  - Nonesuch LP H-71234; published 1969
  - Reissued on CD with the Harpsichord Concerto (next) on Elektra Nonesuch CD, 9 79183-2, published 1992
  - Also included in Elliott Carter: A Nonesuch Retrospective, 4-CD set, Nonesuch 7559-79922-1, published 2009
- Carter: Harpsichord Concerto
  - Double Concerto for Harpsichord and Piano with Two Chamber Orchestras
  - Jacobs, harpsichord; Gilbert Kalish, piano; The Contemporary Chamber Ensemble; Arthur Weisberg, conducting
  - Recorded September 1973
  - Nonesuch LP H-71314; published 1975
  - Reissued with the two chamber sonatas from Nonesuch LP H-71234 (previous) on Elektra Nonesuch CD, 9 79183-2, published 1992
  - Also included in Elliott Carter: A Nonesuch Retrospective, 4-CD set, Nonesuch 7559-79922-1, published 2009
- Schoenberg: Complete Piano Music
  - Three piano pieces, Op. 11
  - Six little piano pieces, Op. 19
  - Piano pieces, Opp. 33a, 33b
  - Five piano pieces, Op. 23
  - Suite for piano, Op. 25
  - Nonesuch LP H-71309, published 1975
  - Reissued on Nonesuch CD, 9 71309-2; Warner Apex CD,
- Debussy: Etudes
  - Etudes for piano, Book I
  - Etudes for piano, Book II
  - Recorded June 1975, Rutgers Presbyterian Church, New York
  - Nonesuch LP H-71322; published 1976
  - Reissued 1987 on Nonesuch CD, 9 79161-2, coupled with a live recording of Debussy's En blanc et noir (with Gilbert Kalish), Ojai Festival, California, 5 June 1982
- Twentieth-century Piano Etudes
  - Bartók: Three Etudes, Op. 18
  - Busoni: Six Polyphonic Etudes
  - Messiaen: Quatre études de rythme
  - Stravinsky: Four Etudes, Op. 7
  - Recorded April 26–28, 1976, New York
  - Nonesuch LP H-71334; published 1976
  - Included on Arbiter 2-CD set, arbiter 124
- Debussy: Preludes
  - Preludes for piano, Book I
  - Preludes for piano, Book II
  - Nonesuch LP HB-73031, published 1978
  - Reissued on Nonesuch CD, 9 73031-2; Warner Ultima CD 79474
- Stravinsky: Music for Two Pianos and Piano, Four Hands
  - (with Ursula Oppens)
  - Concerto per due pianoforti soli
  - Sonata for two pianos
  - Zvietotchnoy valse (for piano, 4 hands)
  - Three easy pieces (for piano, 4 hands)
  - Five easy pieces (for piano, 4 hands)
  - Etude for pianola (performed on 2 pianos)
  - Recorded June 13–15, 1977, New York
  - Nonesuch LP H-71347; published 1978
  - Included on arbiter 155, a 2-CD set, which also includes previously unpublished concert recordings 1972-81
- Ravel: Works for Piano, Four and Six Hands
  - Sites auriculaires (with Gilbert Kalish)
  - Frontispice (with Gilbert Kalish and Teresa Sterne)
  - coupled with Ravel vocal and chamber works played by other artists
  - Nonesuch LP H-71355; published 1978
  - Reissued 1987 on Nonesuch CD, 9 71355-2
- Busoni: The Six Sonatinas for Piano
  - Sonatina (1910)
  - Sonatina seconda (1912)
  - Sonatina ad usum infantis (1915)
  - Sonatina in diem nativitatis MCMXVII (1917)
  - Sonatina brevis. In Signo Joannis Sebastiani Magni (1918)
  - Kammer-Fantasie über Carmen (Sonatina No. 6) (1920)
  - Recorded June 1978, New York
  - Nonesuch LP H-71359; published 1979
  - Included on Arbiter 2-CD set, arbiter 124
- Debussy: Images and Estampes
  - Images (1894)
  - Images Series I and II
  - Estampes
  - Recorded April 1978, New York
  - Nonesuch LP H-71365; published 1979
  - Reissued on Nonesuch CD, 9 71365; Warner Apex CD,
- Organ Chorale Preludes of Bach and Brahms as transcribed for Piano by Busoni
  - Bach: 10 Organ Chorale Preludes, transcribed Busoni:
    - Komm, Gott, Schöpfer!
    - Wachet auf, ruft uns die Stimme
    - Nun komm' der Heiden Heiland
    - Nun freut euch, lieben Christen
    - Ich ruf' zu dir, Herr
    - Herr Gott, nun schleuss' den Himmel auf!
    - Durch Adams Fall ist ganz verderbt
    - Durch Adams Fall ist ganz verderbt (second version)
    - In dir ist Freude
    - Jesus Christus, unser Heiland, der von uns den Zorn Gottes wandt
  - Brahms: 6 Organ Chorale Preludes, transcribed Busoni:
    - Herlich thut mich erfreuen
    - Schmücke dich, o liebe Seele
    - Es ist ein' Ros' entsprungen
    - Herzlich thut mich verlangen
    - Herzlich thut mich verlangen (second version)
    - O Welt, ich muss dich lassen
  - Recorded June 1979, New York
  - Nonesuch LP H-71375; published 1980
  - Included on Arbiter 2-CD set, arbiter 124
- Blues, Ballads and Rags
  - William Bolcom: Three Ghost Rags
  - Copland: Four Piano Blues
  - Rzewski: Four North American Ballads.
  - Recorded June 23–24, 1980, at Columbia 30th St. Recording Studios, New York City
  - Nonesuch LP D-79006; published 1980
  - Reissued on Nonesuch CD, E2 79006
- Virgil Thomson: A Portrait Album
  - Bugles and birds: a portrait of Pablo Picasso
  - With fife and drums: a portrait of Mina Curtis
  - An old song: a portrait of Carrie Stettheimer
  - Tango lullaby: a portrait of Mlle. Alvarez de Toledo
  - Solitude: a portrait of Lou Harrison
  - Barcarolle: portrait of Georges Hugnet
  - Alternations : a portrait of Maurice Grosser
  - In a bird cage: a portrait of Lise Deharme
  - Catalan waltz : a portrait of Ramon Senabre
  - Chromatic double harmonies: portrait of Sylvia Marlowe
  - Aaron Copland: Persistently pastoral
  - Sonata no. 4: Guggenheim jeune (for harpsichord)
  - Coupled with works for violin and brass quintet
  - Recorded May and June 1981 at Columbia 30th St. Studio and RCA Studio A, New York
  - Nonesuch LP D-79024; published 1982
- Stravinsky: Music for Piano, Four Hands
  - (with Ursula Oppens)
  - Petrushka
  - Three Pieces for String Quartet
  - Recorded December 7–8, 1981 at RCA Studio A in New York City
  - Nonesuch LP D-79038; published 1982
  - Included on arbiter 155
- Carter: Solo Piano Music
  - Night Fantasies
  - Piano Sonata
  - Recorded August 1982, RCA Studio A, New York
  - Nonesuch LP D-79047; published 1983
  - Piano Sonata only, reissued 1990 on Elektra Nonesuch CD, 9 79248-2
  - Both works reissued 2009 on Elliott Carter: A Nonesuch Retrospective, 4-CD set, Nonesuch 7559-79922-1
- Three polyphonic masterpieces for two pianos
  - (with Ursula Oppens)
  - Busoni: Fantasia contrappuntistica
  - Mozart arr Busoni: Fantasy for a Musical Clock K608
  - Beethoven: Große Fuge, Op.134
  - Recorded June 20–24, 1983 at American Academy of Arts and Letters, New York
  - Nonesuch LP D-79061; published 1984

=== Live recordings ===
- Paul Jacobs in Recital
  - Beethoven: Waldstein Sonata, op. 53
    - Recorded November 22, 1972 at Brooklyn College
  - Beethoven: Piano Sonata No. 7 in D major, op. 10, no. 3
    - Recorded May 1, 1974 at Brooklyn College
  - Busoni: Preludio, Fuga e Fuga figurata
    - Recorded November 22, 1972 at Brooklyn College
  - Falla: Fantasia Baetica
    - Recording information not given
  - Ravel: Menuet sur Haydn
    - Recorded November 22, 1972 at Brooklyn College
  - Ravel: Valses nobles et sentimentales
    - Recorded June 28, 1973 at Brooklyn College
  - Chambonnières: Chaconne in F major (on the Dowd harpsichord)
    - Recorded in 1978 at Jacobs' home in New York
  - Arbiter, 2-CDs, arbiter 130; published 2001

=== Video ===
Jacobs can be seen and heard on the second episode of the 1965 WNET series Music in the Twenties playing the Concertino for Piano and Orchestra by Arthur Honegger, with series host Aaron Copland conducting.
