= Piano Concerto (Carter) =

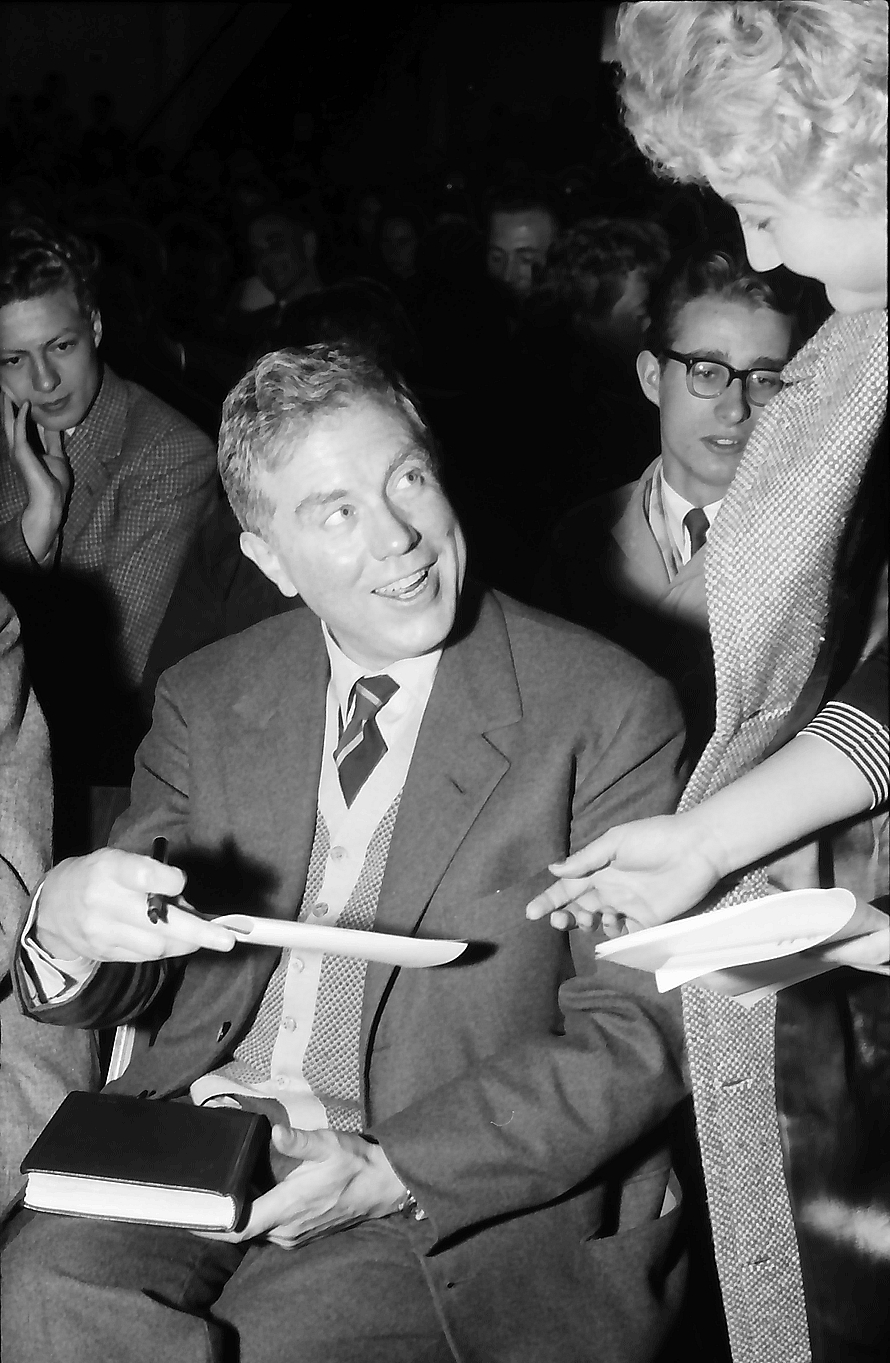
Elliott Carter at the Donaueschingen Festival in 1957

The Concerto for Piano is a composition for solo piano and orchestra by the American composer Elliott Carter. The work was commissioned by the pianist Jacob Lateiner with support from the Ford Foundation. It was composed between 1964 and 1965 and was first performed at Symphony Hall, Boston on January 6, 1967, by Lateiner and the Boston Symphony Orchestra under the conductor Erich Leinsdorf. The piece was dedicated to the composer Igor Stravinsky for his 85th birthday.

== Composition ==
The concerto has a duration of roughly 25 minutes and is composed in two numbered movements. The work is built upon techniques from two previous Carter's pieces: his String Quartet No. 2 (1959) and the Double Concerto for Harpsichord and Piano with Two Chamber Orchestras (1961). Carter elaborated on this in the score program notes, writing:

As in these, there are variously graded sequential and simultaneous oppositions of dramatic character and material associated with the musical protagonists: here, a concertino of three winds and four solo strings mediates between the individualized solo piano part and the orchestral mass. As the work progresses through its two movements, the soloist becomes increasingly disassociated from and opposed to the orchestra, each developing its own musical expression and material in its own way. A unifying musical discourse, however, joins the conflicting elements into one artistic whole.

=== Instrumentation ===
The work is scored for a solo piano and an orchestra comprising three flutes (two doubling piccolo), two oboes, cor anglais, two clarinets, bass clarinet, two bassoons, contrabassoon, four horns, three trumpets, three trombones, tuba, two percussionists, and strings. In addition there is a concertino group consisting of flute, english horn, bass clarinet, violin, viola, cello, and double bass.

== Reception ==
The concerto has been highly praised by music critics and is regarded as one of the composer's best works. Reviewing a 2013 performance of the piece, Andrew Clark of the Financial Times called it "a classic of his high modernist phase" and remarked, "The piece hasn't become any 'lighter' with the years, but the inexorable sweep of this reading helps to mitigate the dense thickets of such complex music." In a guide to Carter's music, Tom Service of The Guardian similarly lauded:

My favourite of the pieces from Carter's heroic period is the 1964-5 Piano Concerto, partly because it makes an extraordinarily energetic and sometimes terrifying noise – such as the moment when the orchestra attempts to suffocate the pianist with a vapour-like veil of sound, but also because it's a piece whose labyrinthine depths of meaning and motion could sustain a lifetime of listening – and are quite possibly unplumbable.

In a thank you letter to Carter, the composer Igor Stravinsky described the composition as "a masterpiece," despite admitting that he at one point had trouble hearing everything that was happening in the score. The music critic Alex Ross commented on Stravinsky's remark, adding:

If Stravinsky struggled, what hope was there for the rest of us? When I pored over the scores, studied Carterite treatises, and rattled the neighbors with repeated listenings to the recordings, I was able to grasp his difficult aesthetic. But when I listened in a more passive mode, I had the instinctive reaction that Carter has inspired in subscription audiences for decades: Please stop this crazy noise.
