= Variations for Orchestra (Carter) =

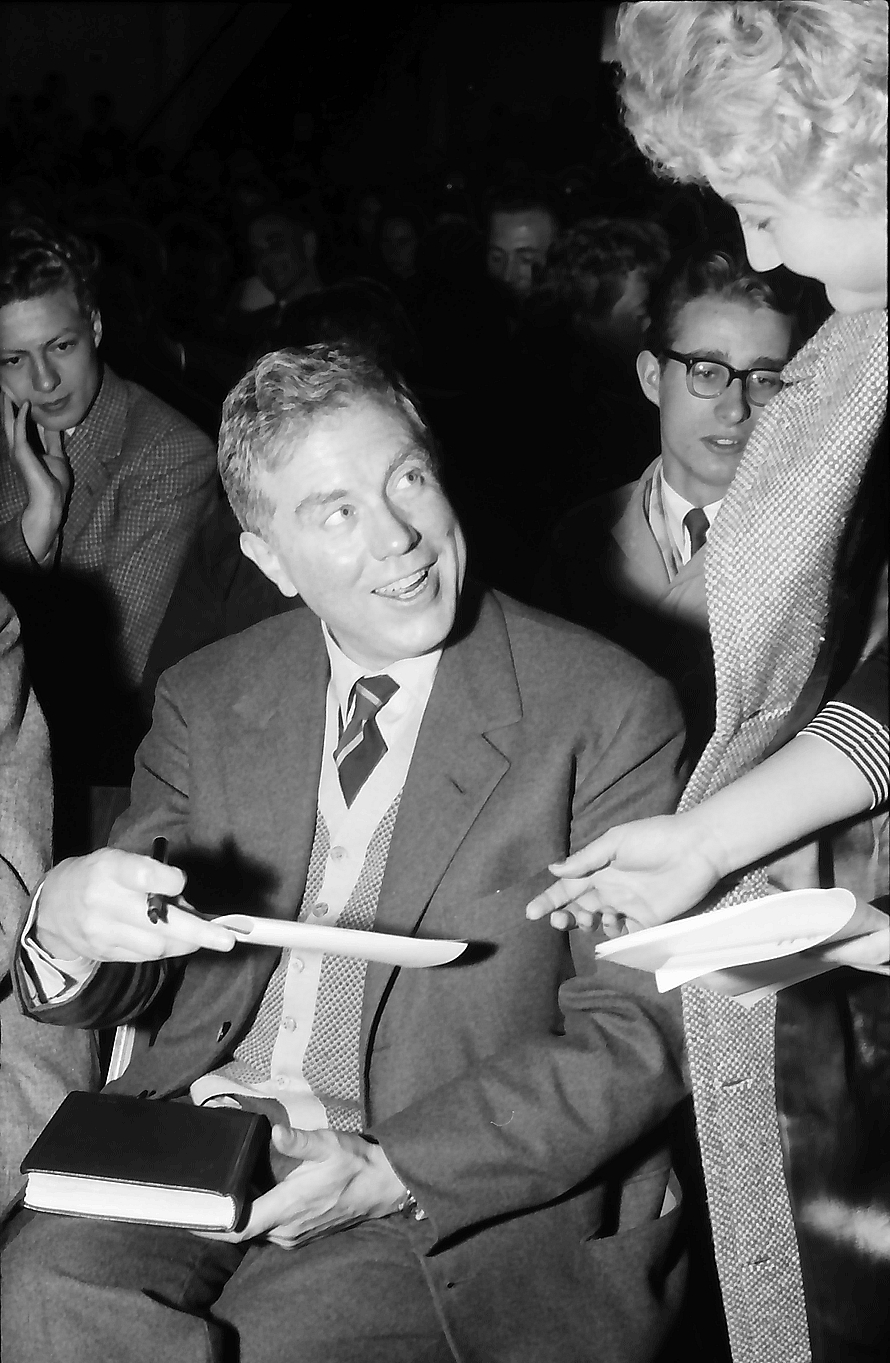
Elliott Carter at the Donaueschingen Festival in 1957

Variations for Orchestra is an orchestral composition by the American composer Elliott Carter. The work was commissioned by the Louisville Orchestra and was composed between 1953 and 1955. It was given its premiere on April 21, 1956, by the Louisville Orchestra under the conductor Robert Whitney, both to whom the work is dedicated. This is Carter's next major work after his first String Quartet.

== Composition ==
Variations for Orchestra has a duration of roughly 24 minutes and consists of twelve connected movements comprising an introduction, a theme, nine variations, and a finale:

1. Introduction: Allegro
2. Theme: Andante
3. Variation 1: Vivace leggero
4. Variation 2: Pesante
5. Variation 3: Moderato
6. Variation 4: Ritardando molto
7. Variation 5: Allegro misterioso
8. Variation 6: Accelerando molto
9. Variation 7: Andante
10. Variation 8: Allegro giocoso
11. Variation 9: Andante
12. Finale: Allegro molto

=== Instrumentation ===
The work is scored for an orchestra comprising two flutes (2nd doubling piccolo), two oboes, two clarinets, two bassoons, four horns, two trumpets, two trombones, bass trombone, tuba, timpani, percussion, harp, and strings.

== Reception ==
Variations for Orchestra has been praised by music critics. Anthony Tommasini of The New York Times wrote, "[Carter's] goal was to write a work of exhilarating variety. Indeed, one way to listen to this piece is to forget everything about the theme-and-variations form and revel instead in the boldly contrasting moods, harmonies, colors and characters of the music." Tim Page of The Washington Post similarly remarked:

As with so much of Carter's later music, this work is based on clashes of musical opposites. The "theme" in these variations is augmented by two equally significant but dramatically different motifs. One occasionally has the sensation that all of the variations are being played at once; the mind focuses on the slow diminution of one passage and the sudden importance of another, as if a world were changing before one's ears.
