= String Quartet No. 5 (Carter) =

American composer Elliott Carter's String Quartet No. 5 is a composition for string quartet. The work was composed between January and July 1995, as a commission for the Arditti Quartet by the city of Antwerp (in its year as City of Culture (1993)), by the Wittener Tage für neue Kammermusik, by the Festival d'Automne à Paris, and by Lincoln Center, New York. It was premiered by the Arditti Quartet (its dedicatee) in Antwerp at deSingel International Art Centre on September 19, 1995.

== Form and content ==
There are twelve movements in all: six short contrasting even-numbered movements with an introductory movement and five interludes, in which the players "discuss in different ways what has been played and what will be played".

1. Introduction ♩ = 72
2. Giocoso ♩ = 96
3. Interlude I
4. Lento espressivo (♩ = 60)
5. Interlude II
6. Presto scorrevole
7. Interlude III
8. Allegro energico (♩ = 72)
9. Interlude IV
10. Adagio sereno (♩ = 48)
11. Interlude V ♩ = 96
12. Capriccioso ♩ = 60

Typical running time – 21'

The character and structure of the Fifth Quartet are determined by the repetition and development of a number of pitch and rhythmic groups described by Carter as "characters". Pitch coherence is achieved by concentrating the material on three hierarchically prominent chords, which increase in importance as the quartet progresses. Two of these are tetrachords, the third a hexachord. In Carter's Harmony Book, the four-note chords are numbers 18 and 23, and the six-note chord is number 35.

The quartet represents two simultaneous "creative processes". In performance, the musicians appear to be first trying out and rehearsing musical ideas (in the introduction and interludes), and then playing them (in the even-numbered movements). At the same time, the sketches show that this mirrors the composer's compositional process as he worked out small sections, not writing linearly from beginning to end, but by assembling small phrases together and polishing them.

The strong characters of the Quartet's materials emerge as a result of the conflict and resolution of rhythmic articulation created during metric modulation. Through the concept of the "time screen", however, Carter creates a gravitational pull toward a central tempo of = 96, the "imperceptible heart beat" of the quartet, which generally remains hidden. Because a sense of tempo relies on a clearly established regular pulse, and Carter only creates such unambiguous passages during metric modulations, it is at those transitions where these rhythmic identities become clear.

== Discography ==
- Carter, Elliott. Chamber Music [String Quartet No. 5, 90+, Sonata for Cello and Piano, Figment, Duo for Violin and Piano, and Fragment for string quartet]. Ursula Oppens (piano); Arditti String Quartet. CD audio disc. Montaigne MO 782091. France: Auvidis, 1998.
- Carter, Elliott. The Complete String Quartets 1–5. Pacifica Quartet. 3 CD audio discs. Naxos 8.503226 (18559362; 8559363; 8559614). Franklin, Tenn.: Naxos of America, 2010.
- Carter, Elliott. The Complete String Quartets 1–5. Juilliard Quartet. 3 CD audio discs. Sony Classical, 2014.
