= Interventions (Carter) =

2007 musical composition by Elliot Carter

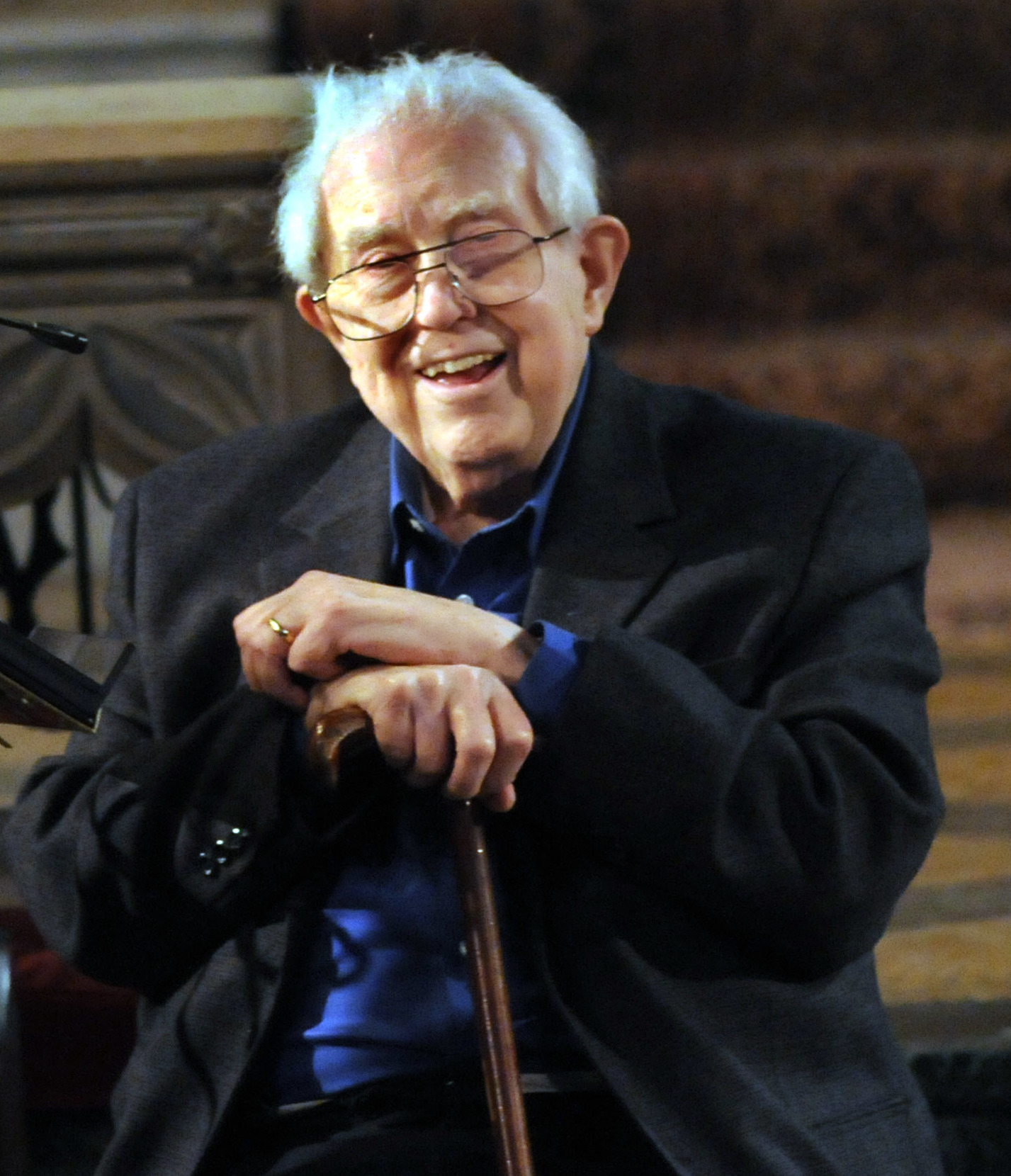
Elliott Carter in 2007

Interventions is a composition for solo piano and orchestra by the American composer Elliott Carter. The work was composed at the behest of the pianist Daniel Barenboim and the conductor James Levine to celebrate Carter's 100th birthday. The piece was completed on April 16, 2007 and was first performed in Symphony Hall, Boston on December 4, 2008 by Daniel Barenboim and the Boston Symphony Orchestra under James Levine.

== Composition ==
Interventions has a duration of roughly 15 minutes and is composed in one continuous movement. Carter wanted the piece to fully utilize the talents of both Barenboim and Levine. He described its composition in the score program notes, writing, "I soon realized that it could not be a regular piano concerto because it would not give equal prevalence to both performers. So I decided to write a work that had one long line, mostly for the strings, interrupted by the piano which also had its developing part interrupted by the orchestra. Each intervening in the other's part, sometimes humorously."

=== Instrumentation ===
The work is scored for solo piano and a large orchestra comprising three flutes (first and third doubling piccolo, second doubling alto flute), three oboes (second doubling cor anglais), two clarinets (second doubling bass clarinet), contrabass clarinet (also doubling bass clarinet), two bassoons, contrabassoon, four horns, three trumpets, three trombones, tuba, four percussionists, and strings.

== Reception ==
Interventions' has been praised by music critics. Reviewing the world premiere, Jeremy Eichler of The Boston Globe wrote, "As you might expect in a Carter work, the traditional model of the Romantic piano concerto is tossed out the window in favor of something more fractured and, quite purposefully, more evenhanded in the interplay between soloist and orchestra." He added:

Cast in one movement roughly 15 minutes long, the music is full of surprisingly lyrical string writing - by Carter's standards - with frequent interruptions from the piano, which then holds court with pointy, eruptive figuration or big, iridescent chords. Two independent trios help negotiate between orchestra and soloist. The final flourish is uncharacteristically brash - and life-affirming. Barenboim, Levine, and the BSO gave it a crackling first performance.

The piece was also lauded by Anthony Tommasini of The New York Times, who opined, "... the 17-minute piece — though brainy and complex, like all of Mr. Carter's scores — was somehow celebratory: lucidly textured, wonderfully inventive, even impish. This was the work of a living master in full command." Mark Swed of the Los Angeles Times called it "a feisty score" and said it made a performance of Igor Stravinsky's The Rite of Spring "anticlimactic" by comparison. He also wrote of Carter, "The world has never known such an artist, one who has reached 100 prolifically making vibrant work for which the wisdom of experience is employed to produce new sensations. History has been made before in Carnegie Hall and centenaries of great composers celebrated, but Thursday’s concert was a first."
