= Holiday Overture =

The Holiday Overture is a composition for orchestra by Elliott Carter. Carter wrote the work during the summer of 1944, on commission from the Boston Symphony Orchestra, to celebrate the liberation of Paris during World War II. In addition, Carter composed the overture for the Independent Concert Music Publisher's Contest 1945, and won this competition. The overture was to have been premiered in Boston. However, Carter made a copy of some parts of the work. Eventually, the work received its premiere in Frankfurt in 1946, conducted by Hans Blümer. In 1961, Carter revised the overture.

== Background ==
The music is optimistic in spirit, reflecting Carter's own affection for his years in Paris and reaction to news of the Allied victory in France. Whilst reminiscent of the populist manner of Aaron Copland, according to the composer himself, the work was also one of his first to use "different contrasting layers of musical activity at the same time". In addition, Carter has said of the work:

... it was to be a demonstration of brilliant orchestration, and a lively, good-spirited sort of piece.

The music has a duration of about 10 minutes. The instrumentation is as follows:

Woodwind:

- two flutes
- piccolo
- two oboes
- English horn
- two clarinets
- bass clarinet
- two bassoons
- contrabassoon

Brass:

- four horns
- three trumpets
- three trombones
- tuba

Percussion:

- timpani
- snare drum
- bass drum
- triangle
- cymbals
- tamtam
- whip

Keyboard:

- piano

Strings:

- 1st and 2nd violins
- violas
- cellos
- double basses

== Recordings ==
- CRI SD 475: American Composers Orchestra; Paul Lustig Dunkel, conductor
- Naxos 8.559151: Nashville Symphony Orchestra; Kenneth Schermerhorn, conductor (recorded 2002)
- Bridge Records 9177: Odense Symphony Orchestra; Donald Palma, conductor
- Testament SBT 1516: Berlin Philharmonic; Aaron Copland, conductor (recorded live on September 30, 1970)
