= Elliott Carter =

American composer (1908–2012)

- Carter in the 2000s
- Born: December 11, 1908; New York City, U.S.
- Died: November 5, 2012 (aged 103); New York City, U.S.
- Education: Harvard University; École Normale de Musique de Paris
- Occupation: Composer
- Awards: Pulitzer Prize for Music; Ernst von Siemens Music Prize

Elliott Cook Carter Jr. (December 11, 1908 – November 5, 2012) was an American modernist composer who was one of the most respected composers of the second half of the 20th century. He combined elements of European modernism and American "ultra-modernism" into a distinctive style with a personal harmonic and rhythmic language, after an early neoclassical phase. His compositions are performed throughout the world, and include orchestral, chamber music, solo instrumental, and vocal works. Carter was the recipient of many awards – he was twice awarded the Pulitzer Prize for his string quartets. He also wrote the large-scale orchestral triptych Symphonia: sum fluxae pretium spei.

Carter was born in New York City. He developed an interest in modern music in the 1920s. He was later introduced to Charles Ives, and he soon came to appreciate the American ultra-modernists. After studying at Harvard University with Edward Burlingame Hill, Gustav Holst and Walter Piston, he studied with Nadia Boulanger in Paris in the 1930s, then returned to the United States. Carter was productive in his later years, publishing more than 40 works between the ages of 90 and 100, and over 20 more after he turned 100 in 2008. He completed his last work, Epigrams for piano trio, on August 13, 2012.

== Biography ==
Elliott Cook Carter Jr. was born in Manhattan on December 11, 1908, the son of a wealthy lace importer, Elliott Carter Sr., and the former Florence Chambers. Much of his childhood was spent in Europe; he spoke French before learning English. As a teenager he developed an interest in music, although his parents did not encourage his interests other than providing for early piano lessons. However, he was encouraged by Charles Ives, who sold insurance to Carter's family. While a student at the Horace Mann School in 1922, he wrote an admiring letter to Ives, who responded and urged him to pursue his interest in music. He began to be interested in modern music as part of his broader exploration of modernism in various other art forms.

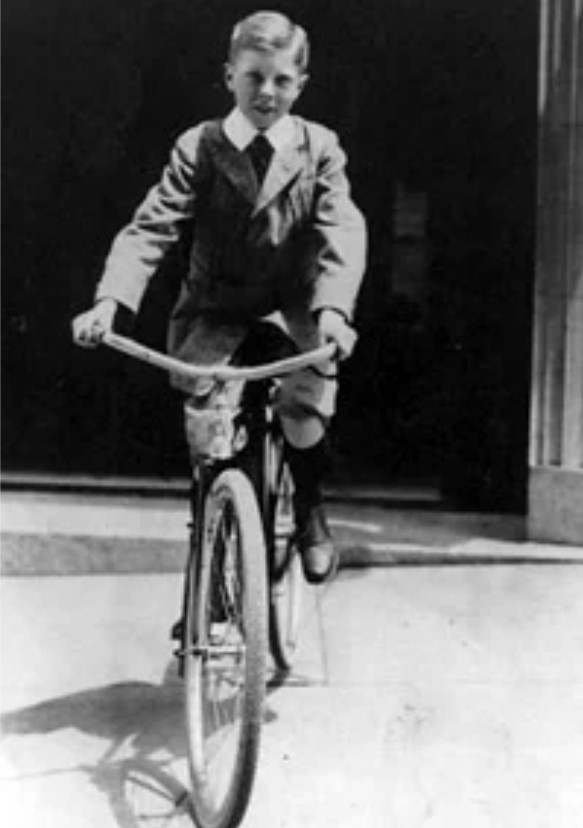
Elliott Carter in 1917

In 1924, the 15-year-old Carter was in the audience and "galvanized" when Pierre Monteux conducted the Boston Symphony Orchestra (BSO) in the New York première of The Rite of Spring. Carter later came to appreciate the American ultra-modernists: Henry Cowell, Edgard Varèse, Ruth Crawford and, later, Conlon Nancarrow. Ives often accompanied Carter to BSO concerts conducted by Serge Koussevitzky, who programmed contemporary works frequently, and then returned to Ives' home to critique and parody the so-called tricks of Debussy, Stravinsky or Prokofiev, who were composing European new music that Ives considered only 'superficially modern'.

Starting in 1926, Carter attended Harvard University, where he majored in English but also studied music, both at Harvard (whose music course did not satisfy him) and at the nearby Longy School of Music, and also sang with the Harvard Glee Club. His Harvard professors included Walter Piston and Gustav Holst. Carter earned a master's degree in music from Harvard in 1932, but the course did not help make much progress in his compositional skills; hence, Carter then moved to Paris to study with Nadia Boulanger, both privately and at the École Normale de Musique de Paris. He worked with Boulanger from 1932 to 1935 (though he did not compose much music with her that he believed was worth preserving) and in the latter year received a doctorate in music (Mus.D.).

Later in 1935, he returned to the US to write music for the Ballet Caravan. The founder of the Ballet Caravan Lincoln Kirstein commissioned Carter to compose two ballets, Pocahontas and The Minotaur, which would be among his longest works he composed during his Neo-classicist phase, though neither of them was greatly successful.

On July 6, 1939, Carter married Helen Frost-Jones. They had one child, a son, David Chambers Carter. He lived with his wife in the same apartment in Greenwich Village from the time they bought it in 1945 to her death in 2003.

From 1940 to 1944, he taught at St. John's College in Annapolis, Maryland. He worked for the Office of War Information during World War II. After the war, he held teaching posts at the Peabody Conservatory (1946–1948), Columbia University, Queens College, New York (1955–56), Yale University (1960–62), Cornell University (from 1967) and the Juilliard School (from 1972). Meanwhile, in the 1950s, Carter, having edited Ives' music, turned back to his interest in the experimentalists. In response to his experience in the war, he decided to achieve an emancipated musical discourse through re-examination of all parameters of music. Notable works during this time were the Cello Sonata, the rhythmically complex first string quartet and Variations for Orchestra. The latter two marked Carter's turning point in his career.

Carter wrote music every morning until his death, of natural causes, on November 5, 2012, at his home in New York City, at age 103.

== Premieres and notable performances ==
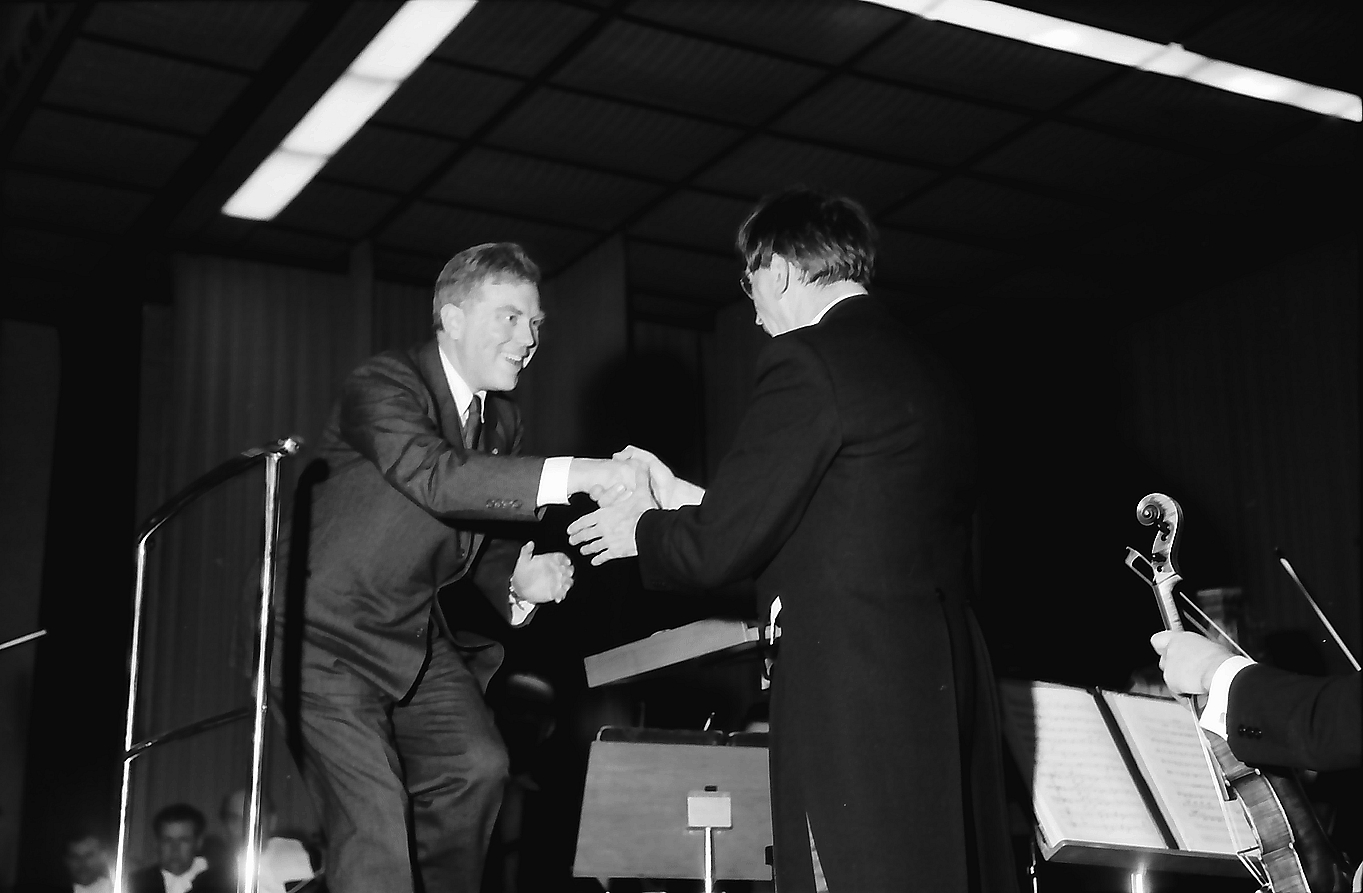
Elliott Carter with Hans Rosbaud at the Donaueschingen Festival in 1957

Carter composed his only opera, What Next?, in 1997–98 for the Berlin State Opera at the behest of conductor Daniel Barenboim. The work premiered in Berlin in 1999 and had its first staging in the United States at the Tanglewood Music Festival in 2006, conducted by James Levine. He later considered writing operas on the themes of communal suicide and a story by Henry James, but abandoned both ideas and resolved to write no more operas.

Interventions for Piano and Orchestra received its premiere on December 5, 2008, by the BSO, conducted by James Levine and featuring the pianist Daniel Barenboim at Symphony Hall, Boston. On December 11, 2008, Barenboim reprised the work with the BSO at Carnegie Hall in New York in the presence of the composer on his 100th birthday. Carter was also present at the 2009 Aldeburgh Festival to hear the world premiere of his song cycle On Conversing with Paradise, based on Ezra Pound's Canto 81 and one of Pound's 'Notes' intended for later Cantos, and usually published at the end of the Cantos. The premiere was given on June 20, 2009, by the baritone Leigh Melrose and the Birmingham Contemporary Music Group conducted by Oliver Knussen.

Figment V for marimba was premiered in New York on May 2, 2009, by Simon Boyar, and Poems of Louis Zukofsky for soprano and clarinet had its first performance by Lucy Shelton and Thomas Martin at the Tanglewood Festival on August 9, 2009. The US premiere of the Flute Concerto took place on February 4, 2010, with the flutist Elizabeth Rowe and the Boston Symphony Orchestra conducted by Levine. The last premiere of Carter's lifetime was Dialogues II, written for Barenboim's 70th birthday and conducted in Milan in October 2012 by Gustavo Dudamel. The last Carter premiere ever, which happened after Carter's death, was "The American Sublime", a work for baritone and large ensemble, dedicated to and conducted by Levine.

== Musical style and language ==
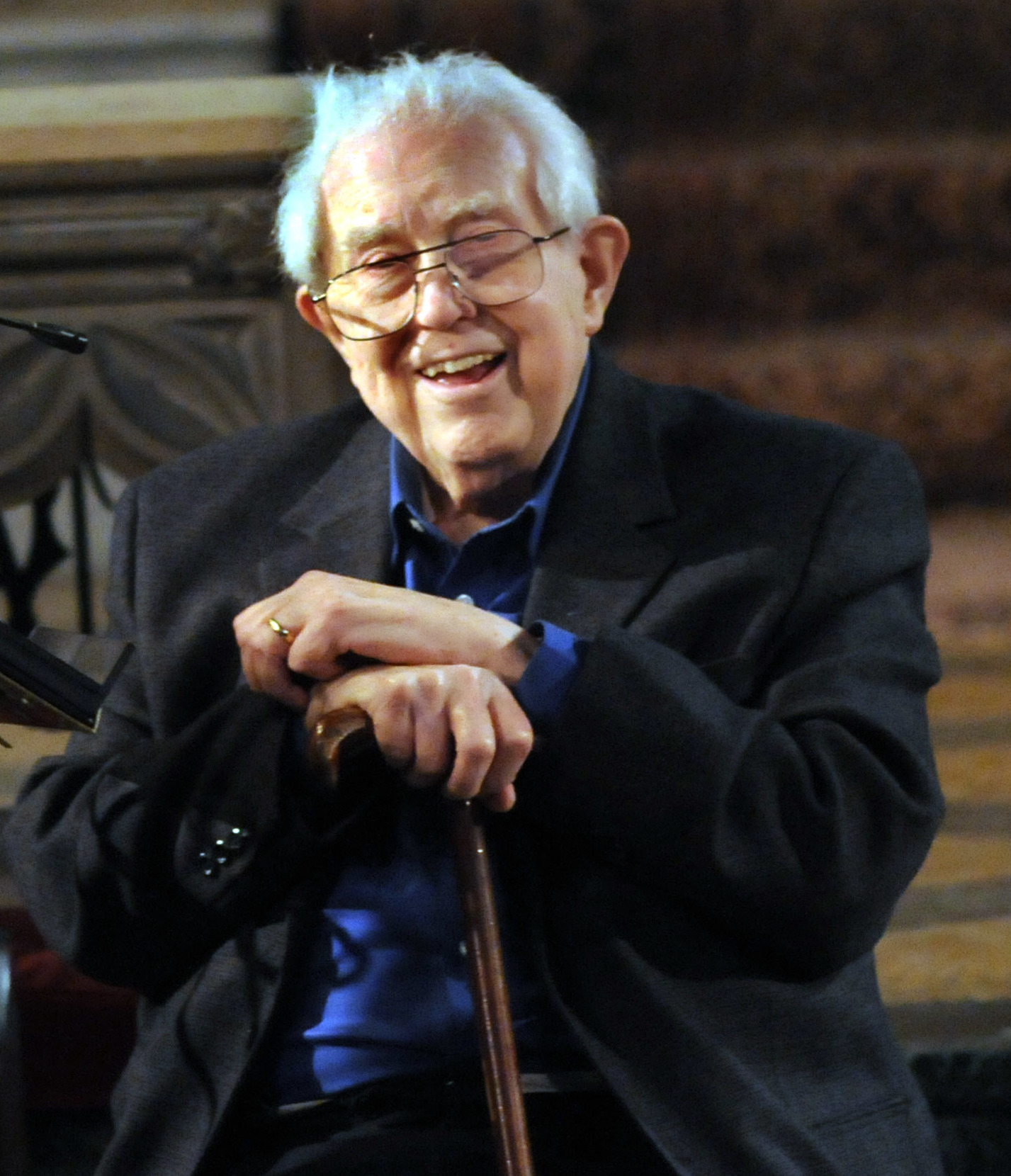
Elliott Carter in 2007

Carter's earlier works were influenced by Igor Stravinsky, Aaron Copland, and Paul Hindemith, and are mainly neoclassical. He had strict training in counterpoint, from medieval polyphony to Stravinsky, and this shows in his earliest music, such as the ballet Pocahontas (1938–39). Some of his music during the Second World War is fairly diatonic, and includes a melodic lyricism reminiscent of Samuel Barber.

Starting in the late 1940s his music shows an increasing development of a personal harmonic and rhythmic language characterized by elaborate rhythmic layering and metric modulation. While Carter's chromaticism and tonal vocabulary parallels serial composers of the period, Carter did not use serial techniques. Carter said, "I certainly have never used a twelve-tone row as the basis of a composition, in the way described in Schoenberg's Style and Idea, nor are my compositions a constant rotation of various permutations of twelve-tone rows". Rather, he independently developed and catalogued all possible collections of pitches (i.e., all possible three-note chords, five-note chords, etc.), compiling what he called his Harmony Book. (An edited version of the book was published in 2002 by Carl Fischer Music.) Musical theorists like Allen Forte independently had systematized these data into musical set theory perhaps having been inspired by Howard Hanson's Harmonic Materials of Modern Music. A series of Carter's works in the 1960s and 1970s generates its tonal material by using all possible chords of a particular number of pitches.

Among his better known works are the Variations for Orchestra (1954–55); the Double Concerto for Harpsichord and Piano with Two Chamber Orchestras (1959–61); the Piano Concerto (1964–65), written as an 85th-birthday present for Stravinsky; the Concerto for Orchestra (1969), loosely based on a poem by Saint-John Perse; and the Symphony of Three Orchestras (1976). He also composed five string quartets, of which the second and third won the Pulitzer Prize for Music in 1960 and 1973 respectively. Spaced at regular intervals throughout his mature career, they are considered by some to be the most important body of work in that medium since Bartók. Symphonia: sum fluxae pretium spei (1993–96) is his largest orchestral work, complex in structure and featuring contrasting layers of instrumental textures, from delicate wind solos to crashing brass and percussion outbursts.

The Piano Concerto (1964–65) uses the collection of three-note chords for its pitch material; the Third String Quartet (1971) uses all four-note chords; the Concerto for Orchestra (1969) all five-note chords; and A Symphony of Three Orchestras uses the collection of six-note chords. Carter also made frequent use of "tonic" 12-note chords. Of particular interest are "all-interval" 12-tone chords, where every interval is represented within adjacent notes of the chord. His 1980 solo piano work Night Fantasies uses the entire collection of the 88 symmetrical-inverted all-interval 12-note chords. Typically, the pitch material is segmented between instruments, with a unique set of chords or sets assigned to each instrument or orchestral section. This stratification of material, with individual voices assigned not only their own unique pitch material but texture and rhythm as well, is a key component of Carter's style. His music after Night Fantasies has been termed his late period and his tonal language became less systematized and more intuitive, but retains the basic characteristics of his earlier works.

Carter's use of rhythm can best be understood with the concept of stratification. Each instrumental voice is typically assigned its own set of tempos. A structural polyrhythm, where a very slow polyrhythm is used as a formal device, is present in many of Carter's works. Night Fantasies, for example, uses a 216:175 tempo relation that coincides at only two points over its 20+ minutes. This use of rhythm was part of his expansion of the notion of counterpoint to encompass simultaneous different characters, even entire movements, rather than just individual lines.

Carter said that the steady pulses of older music reminded him of soldiers marching or horses trotting, sounds no longer heard in the late 20th century, and he wanted his music to capture the sort of continuous acceleration or deceleration experienced in an automobile or an airplane. While Carter's music shows little trace of American popular music or jazz, his vocal music has demonstrated strong ties to contemporary American poetry. He set poems by Elizabeth Bishop (A Mirror on Which to Dwell), John Ashbery (Syringa and Mad Regales), Robert Lowell (In Sleep, in Thunder and Mad Regales), John Hollander (Of Challenge and of Love), William Carlos Williams (Of Rewaking), Wallace Stevens (In the Distances of Sleep and The American Sublime), Ezra Pound (On Conversing with Paradise), E. E. Cummings (A Sunbeam's Architecture), Marianne Moore (What Are Years) and T. S. Eliot (Three Explorations). Twentieth-century poets also inspired several of his large instrumental works, such as the Concerto for Orchestra (St. John Perse) and A Symphony of Three Orchestras (Hart Crane).

== Awards and honors ==
- 1945, 1950: Guggenheim Fellowship for Music Composition
- 1960: Pulitzer Prize for Music, for String Quartet No. 2
- 1963: Elected a member of the American Academy of Arts and Sciences
- 1969: Elected a member of the American Academy of Arts and Letters
- 1973: Pulitzer Prize for Music, for String Quartet No. 3
- 1981: Ernst von Siemens Music Prize
- 1983: Edward MacDowell Medal, awarded by the MacDowell Colony
- 1985: National Medal of Arts, awarded by the by President of the United States and the National Endowment for the Arts
- 1987: Named a Commandeur of the Ordre des Arts et des Lettres by the French government
- 1998: Inducted into the American Classical Music Hall of Fame and Museum
- 2005: The Thomas Jefferson Medal, awarded by the American Philosophical Society
- 2009: Received a Trustees Award (a lifetime achievement award given to non-performers) from the Grammy Awards.
- 2012: Named a Commandeur de la Légion d'honneur by the French government

== Significant works ==
=== Orchestral ===
- Variations for Orchestra (1955)
- Concerto for Orchestra (1969)
- A Symphony of Three Orchestras (1976)
- Penthode (1985)
- Symphonia: sum fluxae pretium spei (1993–1996)

=== Concertos ===
- Double Concerto for Harpsichord and Piano with Two Chamber Orchestras (1959–1961)
- Piano Concerto (1964–1965)
- Oboe Concerto (1986–1987)
- Violin Concerto (1990)
- Cello Concerto (2000)
- Horn Concerto (2006)
- Interventions for Piano and Orchestra (2007)

=== Voice and ensemble ===
- A Mirror on Which to Dwell (1975)
- Syringa (1978)
- In Sleep, in Thunder (1981)

=== Piano ===
- Piano Sonata (1945–46)
- Night Fantasies (1980)
- Two Diversions (1999)
- "Caténaires" (2006)

=== String quartets ===
- String Quartet No. 1 (1951)
- String Quartet No. 2 (1959)
- String Quartet No. 3 (1971)
- String Quartet No. 4 (1986)
- String Quartet No. 5 (1995)

=== Chamber ===
- Cello Sonata (1948)
- Sonata for Flute, Oboe, Cello and Harpsichord (1952)
- Duo for Violin and Piano (1974)
- Triple Duo (1983)
- ASKO Concerto (2000)

== Partial discography ==
- Sonata for Flute, Oboe, Cello and Harpsichord; Sonata for Cello and Piano; Double Concerto for Harpsichord and Piano With Two Chamber Orchestras. Paul Jacobs, harpsichord; Joel Krosnick, cello; Gilbert Kalish, piano; The Contemporary Chamber Ensemble, Arthur Weisberg, cond. Elektra/Nonesuch 9 79183–2.
- String Quartets Nos. 1 and 2. The Composers Quartet. Elektra/Nonesuch 9 71249–2
- Piano Concerto; Variations for Orchestra. Ursula Oppens, piano; Cincinnati Symphony Orchestra, Michael Gielen, cond. New World Records, NW 347–2.
- Triple Duo; Clarinet Concerto; Short Pieces. Nouvel Ensemble Moderne, Lorraine Vaillancourt, cond. ATMA Classique, ACD2 2280.
- Complete Music for Piano. Charles Rosen, piano. Bridge 9090.
- Vocal Works (1975–81): A Mirror on Which to Dwell; In Sleep, In Thunder; Syringa; Three Poems of Robert Frost. Speculum Musicae with Katherine Ciesinki, mezzo; Jon Garrison, tenor; Jan Opalach, bass; Christine Schadeberg, soprano. Bridge, BCD 9014.
- Dialogues; Boston Concerto; Cello Concerto; ASKO Concerto. Nicolas Hodges, piano; Fred Sherry, cello; London Sinfonietta, BBC Symphony Orchestra, ASKO Ensemble, Oliver Knussen, cond. Bridge 9184.
