= String Quartet No. 4 (Carter) =

Composition by Elliott Carter

The Fourth String Quartet by American composer Elliott Carter was composed in 1985–86 in New York City and Rome, and completed in June 1986. It was premiered on September 17, 1986, at Festival Miami, University of Miami, Florida by the Composers String Quartet.

== Form and content ==
In contrast to the collage forms employed by Carter in the 1970s, the Fourth Quartet (similar to the nearly contemporaneous Triple Duo and Penthode) begins with an opposition of instrumental forces and then moves toward a rhapsodically accelerating finale that draws these opposed instruments into a continuous melodic line. The quartet can be heard as "an intensifying dispute, accompanied by a rising sense of intoxication". Each instrument has its own repertory of pitch intervals and its own structural speed. A polyrhythm of 12:126:175:98 governs the structure of the entire composition, usually resulting in rhythmic relations of 8:6:5:7 (the cello plays septuplets nearly all the time).

== Movements ==
It is composed of four movements.

1. Appassionato
2. Scherzando (stesso tempo)
3. Lento (stesso tempo)
4. Presto

Typical running time - 24'

== Discography ==
- Carter, Elliott. The Works for String Quartet vol. 1 [Quartets Nos. 1 & 4]. Arditti String Quartet. CD audio, Etcetera KTC 1065. Amsterdam and Diepholz (West Germany): Etcetera, 1988.
- Carter, Elliott. String Quartet no. 1 (1951); String Quartet No. 2 (1959); String Quartet No. 3 (1971); String quartet No. 4 (1986); Duo for Violin and Piano (1974). Juilliard String Quartet; Christopher Oldfather, piano. 2 CD audio discs. Sony S2K 47229 (47256 and 47257). New York: Sony Classical, 1990.
- Carter, Elliott. The Complete String Quartets 1–5. Pacifica Quartet. 3 CD audio discs. Naxos 8.503226 (18559362; 8559363; 8559614). Franklin, Tenn.: Naxos of America, 2010.
- Composers String Quartet. Three Contemporary American String Quartets [Mel Powell, String Quartet; Elliott Carter, String Quartet No. 4; Milton Babbitt, String Quartet No. 5]. CD audio, Music & Arts CD 606. Berkeley: Music & Arts, 1988.
