= Night Fantasies =

Piano composition by Elliott Carter

Night Fantasies is a 1980 composition for piano by the American composer Elliott Carter. The work was commissioned by the pianists Charles Rosen, Paul Jacobs, Gilbert Kalish, and Ursula Oppens, all to whom the work is dedicated. It was given its world premiere by Ursula Oppens in Bath, Somerset on June 2, 1980—a mere two weeks after its completion. The piece is one of Carter's most regularly performed compositions and has been recorded numerous times.

== Composition ==
Night Fantasies is composed in one continuous movement and has a duration of roughly 24 minutes. Carter conceived it as "a piano piece of continuously changing moods, suggesting the fleeting thoughts and feelings that pass through the mind during a period of wakefulness at night." The composer further described the form of the work in the score program note, remarking:

The quiet, nocturnal evocation with which it begins and to which it returns occasionally, is suddenly broken by a flighty series of short phrases that emerge and disappear. This episode is followed by many others of contrasting characters and lengths that sometimes break in abruptly and at other, develop smoothly out of what has gone before. The work culminates in a loud periodic repetition of an emphatic chord that, as it dies away, brings the work to its conclusion.

He added, "In this score, I wanted to capture the fanciful, changeable quality of our inner life at a time when it is not dominated by strong, directive intentions or desires – to capture the poetic moodiness that, in an earlier romantic context, we employ in the works of Robert Schumann like Kreisleriana, Carnaval, and Davids-bundlertanze."

== Reception ==
Night Fantasies has been praised by musicians and critics alike. The pianist Charles Rosen, who co-commissioned the piece, described it as "perhaps the most extraordinary large keyboard work written since the death of Ravel." The music critic Mark Swed of the Los Angeles Times called the work "an unforgettable memory" and observed, "Its complexities alone could keep you up at night." Jerry Kuderna of the San Francisco Classical Voice similarly described it as Carter's "magnum opus for piano."
