= Oboe Concerto (Carter) =

20th-century oboe concerto by Elliott Carter

The Oboe Concerto is a concerto for solo oboe and orchestra by the American composer Elliott Carter. The work was commissioned by the conductor Paul Sacher for the oboist Heinz Holliger. It was first performed in Zürich, June 17, 1988, by Heinz Holliger and the Collegium Musicum Zürich under the conductor John Carewe.

== Composition ==
The Oboe Concerto has a duration of roughly 25 minutes and is composed in one continuous movement.

=== Instrumentation ===
The concerto is scored for solo oboe and a small orchestra divided into two groups. The concertino group consists of the oboe, violas, and a percussionist. The larger group comprises flute (doubling piccolo, alto flute), clarinet (doubling bass clarinet), horn, trombone, one additional percussionist, and strings (violins I & II, violoncellos, and double basses).

== Reception ==
Conductor David Robertson said of the work:

In between this orchestra — that seems to be resembling nothing so much as the speed with which the brain can put connections together between its millions of neurons — the oboe weaves an incredible line of plaintive sounds and happy and joyous melodies, with calm immediately being disturbed and then irrupting into something else. And it makes for a tremendous ride for everyone, in terms of just how large the palette of expression and musical vocabulary is. Because there are these moments at which he can achieve a kind of glacial calm, and other moments where — even when you know the work very well — there seems to be so much going on that it's almost like a whirlwind of information hitting you at a very rapid pace. And it's that huge amount of descriptive ability which makes him unique among American composers, and the diversity of it reflects something that Carter understood about the American experience.

Alan Rich of Entertainment Weekly was more critical of the piece, saying, "Where is the passion in this music, the secret messages from composer to hearer that tell us why idea number two is the logical outgrowth of idea number one? This is music that lends itself to exhilarating performances (as here), with little to justify it all taking place."
