= String Quartet No. 3 (Carter) =

The Third String Quartet by American composer Elliott Carter was completed in 1971. It is dedicated to the Juilliard String Quartet, and it was premiered in 1973. This quartet earned Carter his second Pulitzer Prize in Music in 1973.

== Construction ==
The string quartet is divided into a pair of duos, Duo I made up of the first violin and the cello, and Duo II made up of the second violin and viola. The two duos play in their own overlapping movements: distinct tempos, articulation, and material, neither coinciding with the other. The first duo is instructed to play rubato throughout its four movements, while the second plays in strict time in six movements. In addition, each movement is assigned a characteristic interval. The ten movements are not played continuously, but rather are fragmented and recombined, producing a total of 24 possible pairings of movements between the duos, as well as a solo statement of each movement. An additional coda brings the total number of sections to 35. The duos rarely synchronize and frequently clash in complex polyrhythms and dissonances.

Each duo uses a distinct interval class, dynamic range, phrasing, and bowing techniques per movement. The movements are:

Duo I:

1. Furioso (major seventh)
2. Leggerissimo (perfect fourth)
3. Andande espressivo (minor sixth)
4. Pizzicato giocoso (minor third)

Duo II:

1. Maestoso (perfect fifth)
2. Grazioso (minor seventh)
3. Pizzicato giusto, mechanico (tritone)
4. Scorrevole (minor second)
5. Largo tranquillo (major third)
6. Appassionato (major sixth)

Carter intended to achieve the effect of two distinct ensemble groups playing two pieces at once, clashing in sound. However, he stressed the importance of observing the combinations of sound between the two sound sources.
