= String Quartet No. 1 (Carter) =

Composition for string quartet by Elliott Carter

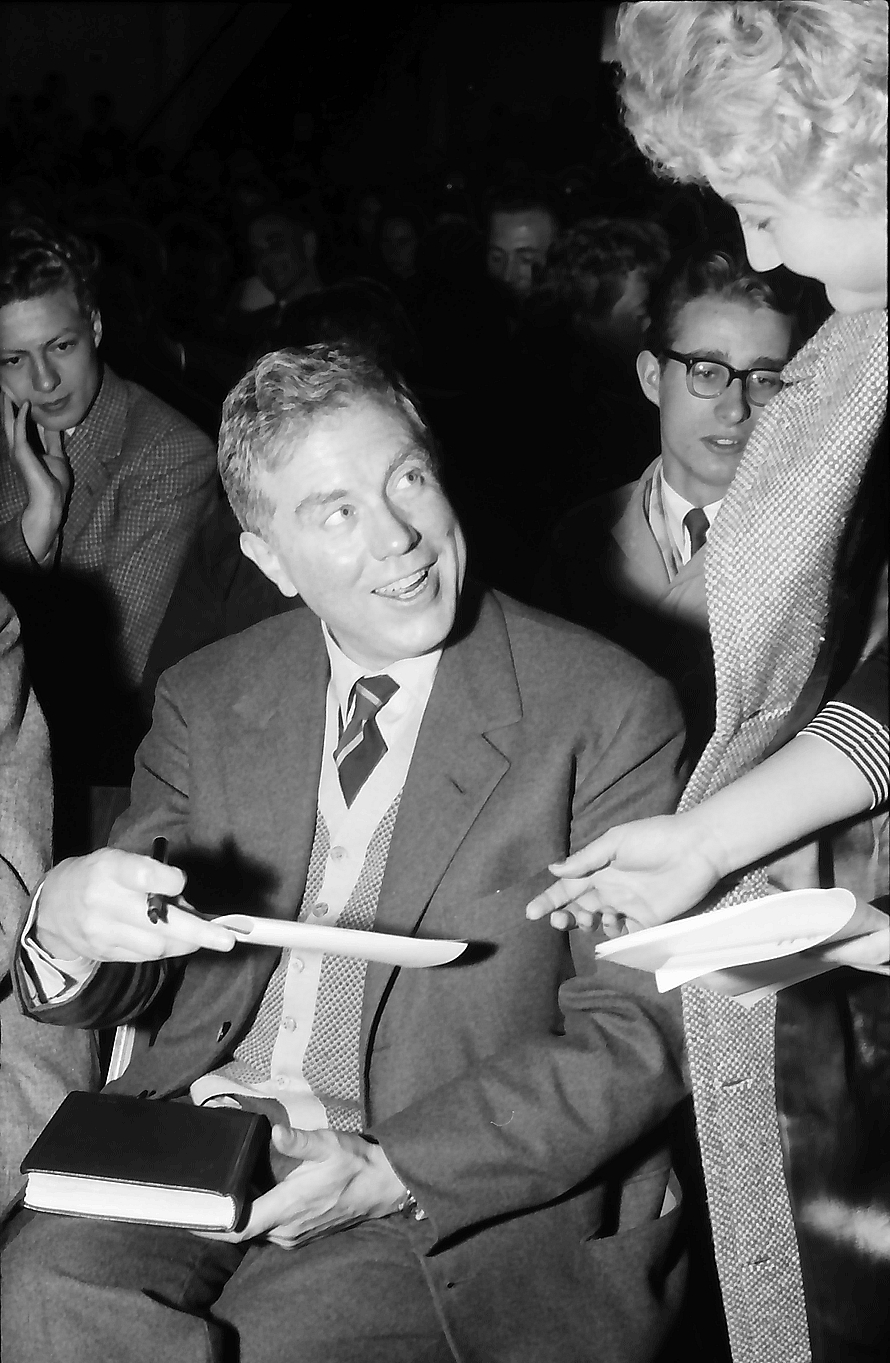
Elliott Carter at the Donaueschingen Festival in 1957

The String Quartet No. 1 by American composer Elliott Carter is a work for string quartet written during a year spent in the Sonoran Desert near Tucson, Arizona from 1950–51. To some extent, it can be said that this was his first major breakthrough work as a composer. The piece was premiered on 26 February 1953 at Columbia University, performed by the Walden Quartet of the University of Illinois.

A primary compositional technique used in the quartet is the principle of metric modulation (temporal modulation)—one for which Carter was to become particularly renowned. Although he was not the first composer to use this device (such as Stravinsky's Symphonies of Wind Instruments, (1920)) he was seemingly the first to develop such complex transformations. It is said that Carter assigned to tempo the structural role that earlier composers gave to tonality.

== Movements ==
The string quartet is composed of three movements.

1. Fantasia. Maestoso – Allegro scorrevole
2. Allegro scorrevole – Adagio
3. Variations

The quartet embeds four movements in three sections, all contained between two solo cadenzas acting as bookends at each end of the quartet. The two cadenzas—the first for cello and the concluding for first violin—frame the piece conceptually, as Carter explains:

Like the desert horizons I saw daily while it was being written, the First Quartet presents a continuous unfolding and changing of expressive characters—one woven into the other or emerging from it—on a large scale. The general plan was suggested by Jean Cocteau's film Le Sang d'un poète, in which the entire dreamlike action is framed by an interrupted slow-motion shot of a tall brick chimney in an empty lot being dynamited. Just as the chimney begins to fall apart, the shot is broken off and the entire movie follows, after which the shot of the chimney is resumed at the point it left off, showing its disintegration in mid-air, and closing the film with its collapse on the ground. A similar interrupted continuity is employed in this quartet's starting with a cadenza for cello alone that is continued by the first violin alone at the very end. On one level, I interpret Cocteau's idea (and my own) as establishing the difference between external time (measured by the falling chimney, or the cadenza) and internal dream time (the main body of the work)—the dream time lasting but a moment of external time, but from the dreamer's point of view, a long stretch.

Within these bookends Carter composes four different sections, which he considers proper movements. However, the movements are not differentiated by pauses, instead bleeding into one another for an integration that pauses would only distort. Carter elaborates on this point:

Note that while there are really four movements in this piece, only three are marked in the score as separate movements, and these three do not correspond to the four "real" movements. The four "real" movements are Fantasia, Allegro scorrevole, Adagio, and Variations. But the movements are all played attacca, with the pauses coming in the middle of the Allegro scorrevole and near the beginning of the Variations. Thus there are only two pauses, dividing the piece into three sections. The reason for this unusual division of movements is that the tempo and character change, which occurs between what are usually called movements, is the goal, the climax of the techniques of metrical modulation which have been used. It would destroy the effect to break off the logical plan of movement just at its high point. Thus pauses can come only between sections using the same basic material. This is most obvious in the case of the pause before the movement marked Variations. In reality, at that point the Variations have already been going on for some time.

== Commentary ==
In its treatment of vertical pitch space, the First String Quartet falls relatively early within Carter's development of a harmonic procedure involving sets of pitch classes. Specifically, Carter claims that he was guided by an all-interval tetrachord in the development of this work.

In all my works from the Cello Sonata up through the Double Concerto I used specific chords mainly as unifying factors in the musical rhetoric—that is, as frequently recurring central sounds from which the different pitch material of the pieces was derived. For example, my First String Quartet is based on an "all-interval" four-note chord, which is used constantly, both vertically and occasionally as a motive to join all the intervals of the work into a characteristic sound whose presence is felt "through" all the very different kinds of linear intervallic writing. This chord functions as a harmonic "frame" for the work in just the sense I meant earlier, in talking about all the events and details of a piece of music feel as if they belong together and constitute a convincing and unified musical continuity.

Elsewhere he notes that this chord is "one of the two four-note groups that joins all the two-note intervals into pairs, thus allowing for the total range of interval qualities that still can be referred back to a basic chord-sound. This chord is not used at every moment in the work but occurs frequently enough, especially in important places, to function, I hope, as a formative factor."

The horizontal element—time—more explicitly occupies Carter's attention in the First String Quartet. Carter's primary means of maintaining motion while also varying that motion is a technique penned by Richard Franko Goldman as "metric modulation." In this process the music continuously changes meters in such a way that either the subdivision of the beat or the beat itself stays the same. In the former case the tempo will change as the number of micro-pulses (which maintain their rate) within the beat change; in the latter (signaled in the score with doubled bar lines) the subdivision will change while the macro-pulse stays the same. Within the progression of modulations different voices behave as though they are in different meters as different voices either prepare, result from, or resist meter changes, not in congruence with each other. This allows Carter to move smoothly between asynchronicity and synchronicity of voices. As musicologist Joseph Kerman summarizes, "Simultaneous speeds give Carter novel possibilities of texture; successive speeds give him novel possibilities of musical movement."

His Second Quartet is far more fragmentary in style.

== Reception ==
According to another American composer, Virgil Thomson, this quartet enjoyed a remarkable "reputation success." Initially, Carter had to wait more than a year after finishing the composition before an ensemble was willing to perform it. Through this work, Carter was awarded a prize from the jury of the International quartet-writing competition then held in Belgium in 1953, to which Carter had submitted the score. This allowed this work to be performed in Europe by the Paris-based Parrenin Quartet, and hence performed in Rome in April 1954.
