= String Quartet No. 2 (Carter) =

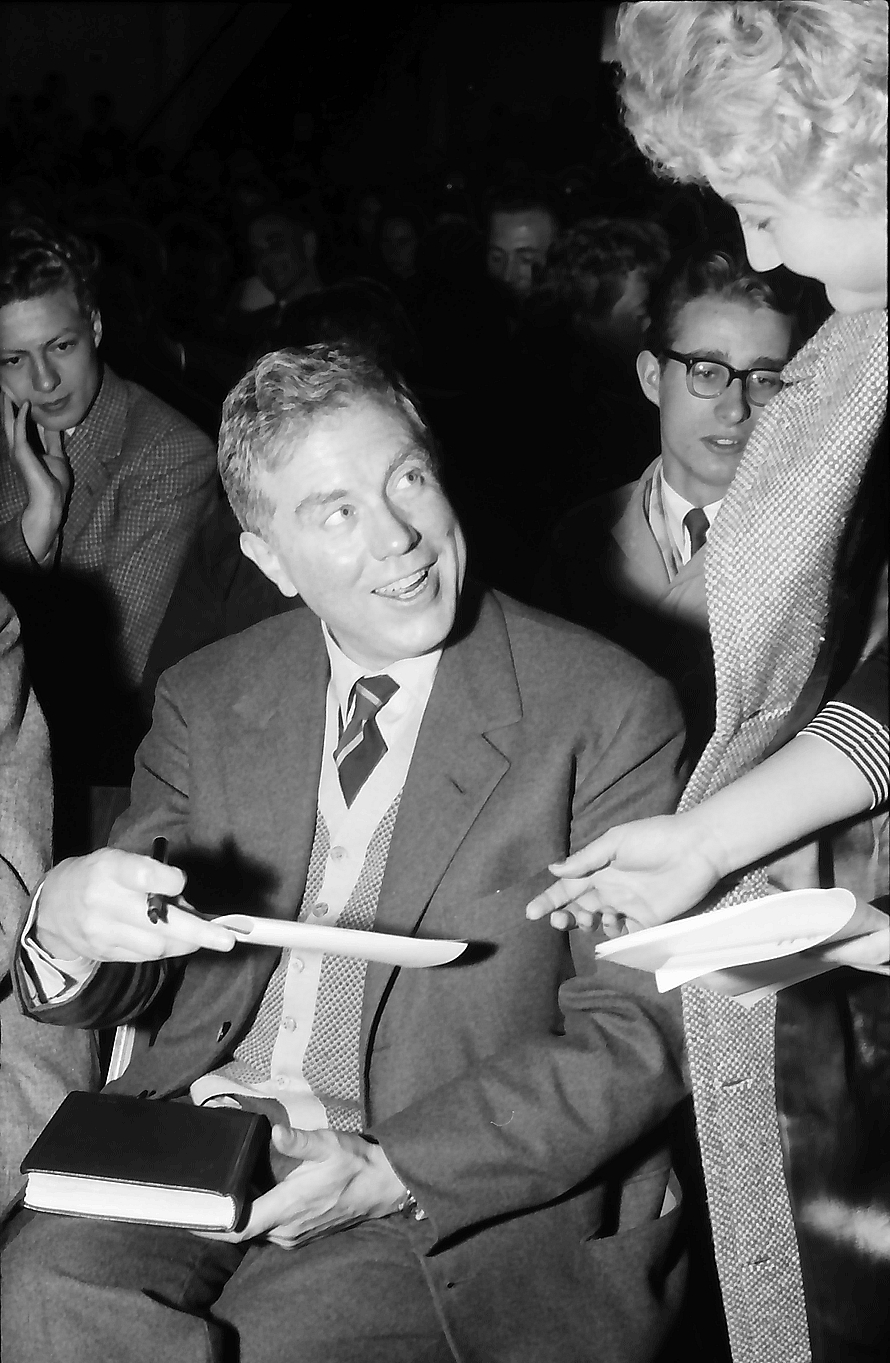
Elliott Carter at the Donaueschingen Festival in 1957

The Second String Quartet by American composer Elliott Carter was completed in 1959. This composition for string quartet was commissioned by the Stanley String Quartet of the University of Michigan, who decided not to play it upon seeing the score, and received its first performance in 1960 by the Juilliard String Quartet.

The quartet is considerably influenced by the music of European avant-garde composers who were gaining celebrity at this time, particularly Pierre Boulez's Le Marteau sans maître. This is a much more fragmentary piece than his earlier quartet (1951): the four instruments play very individual roles and unpredictably bounce off one another. Indeed, Carter has instructed the players to sit as far apart as possible so that they appear to be playing different pieces simultaneously.

== Character ==
Each of the parts has its own different character:

- First Violin: "mercurical"
- Second Violin: "laconic"
- Viola: "expressive"
- Cello: "impetuous"

Carter has distinguished each character not just by general style, but also by the rigorous assignment of musical materials.

== Reception ==
This work had brought Carter recognition in America comparable to what his First has given him back in Europe. This work was awarded three major prizes, including the Pulitzer Prize.
