= Ursula Oppens =

American pianist (born 1944)

- Born: February 2, 1944 (age 82); New York City, New York, United States
- Occupations: Pianist; Educator

Ursula Oppens (born February 2, 1944) is an American classical concert pianist and educator.

== Biography ==
Ursula Oppens was born on February 2, 1944, in New York City into a musical family from Jewish parents who had fled Prague in 1938. She obtained a high school diploma from the Brearley School (1961) a Bachelor of Arts degree (cum laude) from Radcliffe College (1965) and an M.S. degree from the Juilliard School (1967). She began early piano studies with her mother Edith Oppens, a noted piano pedagogue, and went on to study with American pianist Leonard Shure. At Juilliard she studied with Rosina Lhévinne and Felix Galimir. In 1969 Oppens won the Gold Medal at the Busoni International Piano Competition and the Young Concert Artists competition, plus an Avery Fisher Career Grant in 1976. She served as a Founding Member of the Speculum Musicae from 1971 to 1982. From 1994 until 2008 Oppens was on the summer faculty of the Tanglewood Music Center. She held the position of Distinguished Professor of Music at Northwestern University from 1994 to 2008, and in 2008 went on to take up a new post as Distinguished Professor of Music at the Conservatory of Music at Brooklyn College and the CUNY Graduate Center in New York City. Oppens is a member of the American Academy of Arts and Sciences. She was also a winner of the Johann Sebastian Bach International Piano Competition in Washington, D.C. In 2019, Oppens received an honorary Doctor of Music degree from the New England Conservatory of Music.

== Work ==
Ursula Oppens is renowned for her commissioning and championship of the music of American composers who were born predominantly in the early decades of the 20th century. The following is a list of composers who have been commissioned by Oppens or who have written works for her: Carla Bley, William Bolcom, Anthony Braxton, Elliott Carter, John Corigliano, Anthony Davis, John Harbison, Julius Hemphill, M. William Karlins, Bun-Ching Lam, Tania León, Peter Lieberson, Patricia Morehead, Conlon Nancarrow, Tobias Picker, Frederic Rzewski, Allen Shawn, Alvin Singleton, Richard Teitelbaum, Francis Thorne, Joan Tower, Lois V Vierk, Amy Williams, Christian Wolff, Amnon Wolman, and Charles Wuorinen. Often such composers have credited Oppens, an acclaimed pianist in the traditional repertory, with being an invaluable pianistic influence in the creation of their music. Oppens's command of contemporary idioms has also extended to the works of such European masters as Luciano Berio, György Ligeti, and Witold Lutosławski, whose Piano Concerto was given its Chicago Symphony premiere by Oppens under the baton of Erich Leinsdorf in 1994.

== Recordings ==
Oppens's discography includes a recording on Vanguard of Frederic Rzewski's "The People United Will Never Be Defeated" and a version on American Piano Music of Our Time of Elliott Carter's Night Fantasies. Overall, Oppens's body of recordings—which has received four Grammy nominations to date—forms a survey of American contemporary piano music which, in addition to the aforementioned listings, also includes the complete piano music of Elliott Carter and John Corigliano, and compositions by John Adams (composer), Julius Hemphill, Conlon Nancarrow and Tobias Picker, among others. Oppens has also set to disc a group of Beethoven piano sonatas and piano pieces for the Music & Arts label. To date Oppens has recorded for the following labels: Cedille, Wergo, Music & Arts, Vanguard Classics, Mode, Montaigne, CRI, Nuevo Era, Naxos, Angel, New World, Arte Nova, Nonesuch, Albany Records, Mark Masters, Summit, Boosey & Hawkes, New World, DeNote, Watt Works, and Bridge.

== Complete discography ==
SOLO RECORDINGS:

Title	Description	Label
Rzewski: The People United Will Never be Defeated		Cedille 90000 158*
Oppens Plays Carter: Elliott Carter at 100		Cedille CD 90000 108*
"Winging It": Piano Music of John Corigliano		Cedille CD 90000 123*
Keys to the City: Works for Piano by Tobias Picker		Wergo CD 66952
Carnegie Hall Millennium Piano Book	Works by Elliott Carter, Frederic Rzewski, John Harbison, Chen Yi, Wolfgang Rihm, Louis Andriessen, Milton Babbitt, Tan Dun, Ellen Taaffe Zwilich, and C. Hannibal	Boosey & Hawkes
American Piano Music of Our Time Volume I	Elliott Carter Night Fantasies John Adams Phrygian Gates William Bolcom The Dead Moth Tango Lukas Foss The Curriculum Vitae Tango Julius Hemphill Parchment David Jaggard Tango Conlon Nancarrow Tango? Michael Sahl Tango From Exiles’ Café	Music & Arts CD 862*
American Piano Music of Our Time Volume II	Anthony Davis Middle Passage John Harbison Piano Sonata No. 1 Conlon Nancarrow Two Canons for Ursula Tobias Picker Old and Lost Rivers Frederic Rzewski Mayn Yingele Charles Wuorinen The Blue Bamboula	Music & Arts CD 862
Beethoven	Fantasy in G minor, Op. 77 Sonata No. 11, B-flat Major, Op. 22 Sonata No. 29 in B-flat Major, Op. 106, "Hammerklavier"	Music & Arts CD 734
Frederic Rzewski: The People United Will Never Be Defeated		Vanguard Classics OVC 8056*

  - Grammy Nomination

OTHER SOLO RECORDINGS:

Composer	Work(s)	Label
Elliott Carter	Retrouvailles	Quintets and Voices, Mode 128
Elliott Carter	90+ Duo for Violin and Piano (Irvine Arditti) Sonata for Cello and Piano (Rohan de Saram)	Montaigne MO 78 2091**
Stephen Demski	Tender Buttons/Pterodactyl	Music from Dartmouth 0200
Peter Lieberson	Fantaisie	CRI S-350
Otto Luening	Sonata for Piano	CRI SD334
Tobias Picker	When Soft Voices Die	CRI SD427
Robert Schumann	Carnaval, Opus 9 (Concorsopianistico internazionale "Ferruccio Busoni" Bolzano 30 Anni di Storia pianistica) (Commemorative recording)	Nuevo Era 5718-DM
Joan Tower	Holding a Daisy Or Like a...an Engine	Naxos 8.559215
Christian Wolff	Hay Una Mujer Desaparecida	Music from Dartmouth 0200

    - Gramophone Magazine 1999 Awards Issue: Voted best 20th-Century Chamber Music Recording

RECORDINGS WITH ORCHESTRA:

Composer	Work	Symphony, Conductor	Label
John Adams	Grand Pianola Music	Solisti New York, Feinberg, Wilson	Angel DS3735
Elliott Carter	Piano Concerto	Cincinnati Symphony Orchestra, Gielen	Arte Nova 74321-27773
Elliott Carter	Piano Concerto	Sudwestfunk Orchester, Gielen	Arte Nova 74321-27773
Joseph Schwantner	Distant Runes & Incantations	St. Louis Symphony, Slatkin	Nonesuch 79143
Allen Shawn	Piano Concerto	Albany Symphony, Allen Miller	Albany Records, Troy 441
Igor Stravinsky	Concerto for Piano and Winds	University of Florida Wind Symphony	Mark Masters
Igor Stravinsky	Concerto for Piano and Winds	Symphonic Wind Ensemble of Northwestern University, Thompson	Summit
Francis Thorne	Piano Concerto No. 3	New Orchestra of Westchester, Dunkel	New World
Joan Tower	Rapids	UW Madison Symphony Orchestra, Becker	UW-Madison School of Music 193156902-9
Joan Tower	Piano Concerto	Louisville Symphony, Silverstein	DeNote Records DND 1016

CHAMBER MUSIC RECORDINGS:

Composer	Work(s)	Collaborator(s)	Label
Laura Kaminsky	Fantasy: Oppens Plays Kaminsky	Jerome Lowenthal, Jeffery Meyer, Cassatt String Quartet	Cedille CDR 90000 202
L. Van Beethoven	Grosse Fuge, Op. 134	Paul Jacobs	Nonesuch 79061
Carla Bley	3/4	Various	Watt Works 3
Johannes Brahms	Sonatas, Op. 120, No. 1 & 2, Scherzo in C Minor	Barbara Westphal	Bridge BCD 9021
Anthony Braxton	For Two Pianos	Frederic Rzewski	Arista Freedom
Elliott Carter	Quintets and Voices, Quintet for Piano and Strings, Quintet for Winds and Piano	Arditti Quartet, Taylor, Neidich, Morelli, Purvis	Mode 128
Elliott Carter	A Mirror On Which To Dwell	Speculum Musicae	CBS M35171
Company	Epiphany	Derek Bailey and others	Incus 46-47
Alvin Curran	Era Ora, For Cornelius	Frederic Rzewski	New Albion 011
Peter Maxwell Davies	Sonata for Trumpet and Piano	Gerard Schwarz	Nonesuch 0298
Claude Debussy	(Ravel) Nocturnes (Commemorative Recording)	Aki Takahashi	Music Today WWCC7107-10
Claude Debussy	En blanc et noir	Jerome Lowenthal	CDR 90000 119
Morton Feldman	Spring of Chosroes	Paul Zukovsky	CP2 102
Irving Fine	Sonata for Violin and Piano	Ida Kavafian	Bridge 9123
John Harbison	The Flower-Fed Buffaloes	Speculum Musicae	Nonesuch 71366
	Variations	R. Harbison, D. Satz	Northeastern NR23¬0CD
Julius Hemphill	One Atmosphere		Tzadik 7090
David Lang	Illumination Rounds	Rolf Schulte	CRI CD 625
Olivier Messiaen	Visions de L’Amen	Jerome Lowenthal	CDR90000 119
Donald Martino	Notturno	Speculum Musicae	Nonesuch 71300
W.A. Mozart	Fantasia for a Musical Clock K. 608 (trans. Busoni)	Paul Jacobs	Nonesuch 79061
Tobias Picker	Sextet No. 3	Speculum Musicae	CRI 427
Frederic Rzewski	Night Crossing with Fisherman Winnsboro Cotton Mill Blues	Frederic Rzewski	Music & Arts CD 988
Carl Ruggles	Vox Clamans in Deserto	Speculum Musicae	CBS
Artur Schnabel	Sonata for Violin & Piano	Zukovsky	CP2 102
Arnold Schoenberg	Cabaret Songs; Songs, Opus 2; Book of The Hanging Gardens	Phyllis Bryn-Julson	Music & Arts CD650
Allen Shawn	Sextet	Aspen Wind Quintet	Northeastern NR 2580
Igor Stravinsky	The Four Hand Petrouchka	Paul Jacobs	Nonesuch 79038
Igor Stravinsky	Music for Two Pianos and Piano Four Hands	Paul Jacobs	Nonesuch H71347
Richard Wilson	Concert Piece for Violin and Piano	Rolf Schulte	CRI CD 602
Amnon Wolman	Thomas and Beulah	Cynthia Hayman, soprano, Wolman, electronics	Innova 559
Charles Wuorinen	Speculum Speculi	Speculum Musicae	Nonesuch 71300
Charles Wuorinen	Quintet	C. Macomber, C. Zori, S. St. Johns, F. Sherry	Koch 37410-2H1
Vyautas Bacevičius	Septime Mot, opus 75	Gabrielius Alekna	Toccata Classics 0134
Stefan Wolpe	Songs: The Angel, Two Songs for Baritone, Songs of the Jewish Pioneers	Rebecca Jo Loeb, Matt Boehler	Bridge 9308
Richard Strauss	Andante for Horn and Piano	William Barnewitz	AV 86A AV 2126
W.A. Mozart	Quintet for Piano and Winds K 452	Margaret Butler, Todd Levy Ted Soluri, William Barnewitz	AV 86A
Johannes Brahms	Wiegenlied opus 49 no. 4 4 (arr. Barnewitrz)	William Barnewitz	AV 86A

== Prizes and honors ==
- Honorary Doctor of Music, New England Conservatory of Music 2019
- Grammy nomination, 2011 Winging It: The Piano Music of John Corigliano.
- Grammy nomination 2009 Oppens Plays Carter
- Alumna Recognition Award, Radcliffe Institute of Advanced Study 2005
- Letter of Distinction, American Music Center 2002
- Convention Artist, MTNA 2000
- Paul Fromm Award-University of Chicago 1998
- Grammy nomination 1990 American Piano Music of Our Time
- Phi Beta Kappa (honorary) 1990
- Grammy nomination 1980 Frederic Rzewski, The People United Will Never Be Defeated
- Record World Award 1979
- Avery Fisher Career Grant 1976
- Martha Baird Rockefeller Grant 1970
- Gold Medal Busoni International Piano Competition, 1969
- Diploma d'onore Accademia Chigiana 1969
- Josef Lhévinne Scholarship 1966
- National Merit Scholarship 1961
