= Metric modulation =

Musical technique

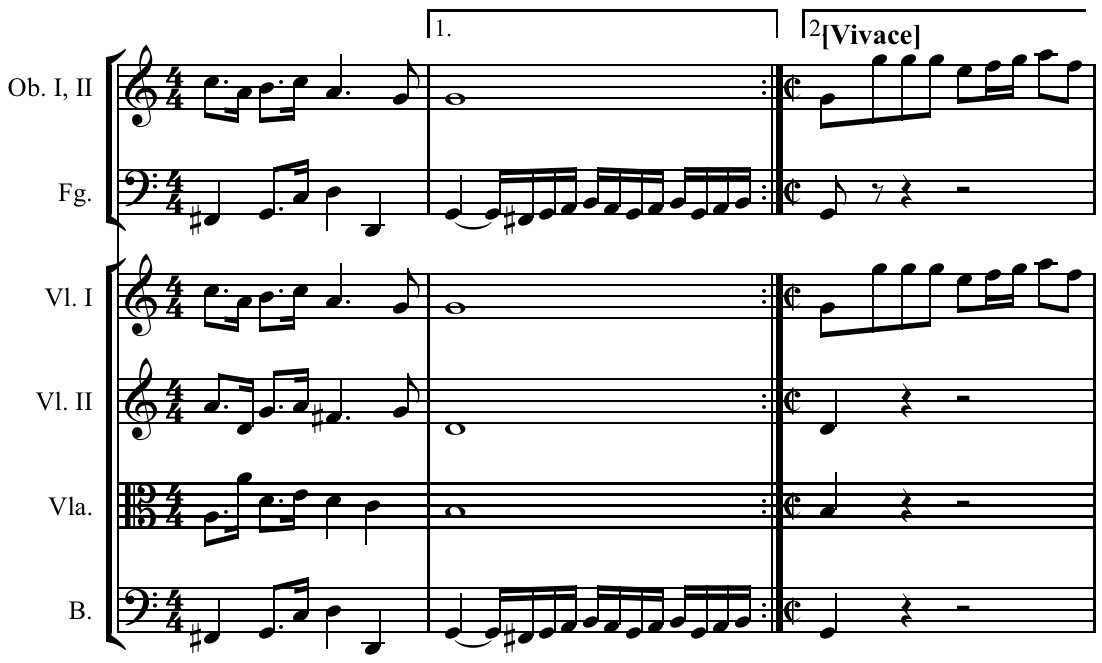
Simplest form of metric modulation, unmarked ( =), in a piece by J.S. Bach. Slow introduction followed by an allegro traditionally taken at double the speed. Sixteenth notes in the old tempo prepare for eighth notes in the new tempo. Without repeat

In music, metric modulation is a change in pulse rate (tempo) and/or pulse grouping (subdivision) that is derived from a note value or grouping heard before the change. Examples of metric modulation may include changes in time signature across an unchanging tempo, but the concept applies more specifically to shifts from one time signature/tempo (metre) to another, wherein a note value from the first is made equivalent to a note value in the second, like a pivot or bridge. The term "modulation" invokes the analogous and more familiar term in analyses of tonal harmony, wherein a pitch or pitch interval serves as a bridge between two keys. In both terms, the pivoting value functions differently before and after the change, but sounds the same, and acts as an audible common element between them. Metric modulation was first described by Richard Franko Goldman while reviewing the Cello Sonata of Elliott Carter, who prefers to call it tempo modulation. Another synonymous term is proportional tempi.

A technique in which a rhythmic pattern is superposed on another, heterometrically, and then supersedes it and becomes the basic metre. Usually, such time signatures are mutually prime, e.g., 4/4 and 3/8, and so have no common divisors. Thus the change of the basic metre decisively alters the numerical content of the beat, but the minimal denominator (1/8 when 4/4 changes to 3/8; 1/16 when, e.g., 5/8 changes to 7/16, etc.) remains constant in duration.

== Determination of the new tempo ==
The following formula illustrates how to determine the tempo before or after a metric modulation, or, alternatively, how many of the associated note values will be in each measure before or after the modulation:

$\frac{\text{new tempo}}{\text{old tempo}} = \frac{\text{number of pivot note values in new measure}}{\text{number of pivot note values in old measure}}$

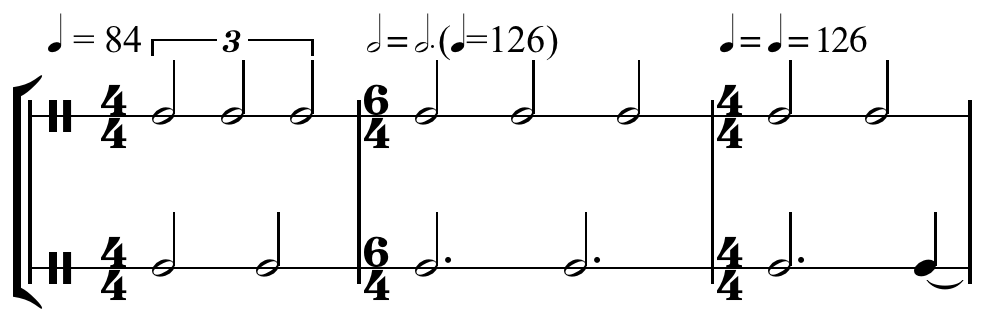
Metric modulation: 2 half notes = 3 half notes or Play with eighth note subdivision for tempo/metre comparison

Thus if the two half notes in 4/4 time at a tempo of quarter note = 84 are made equivalent with three half notes at a new tempo, that tempo will be:

$$\begin{align}
\qquad \frac{x}{84} & = \frac{3}{2}, \\
{84} \cdot \frac{x}{84} & = \frac{3}{2} \cdot {84}, \\
\qquad {x} & = \frac{3 \cdot 84}{2}, \\
\qquad {x} & = {126} \\
\end{align}$$

Example taken from Carter's Eight Etudes and a Fantasy for woodwind quartet (1950), Fantasy, mm. 16-17.

Note that this tempo, quarter note = 126, is equal to dotted-quarter note = 84 (( = .) = ( = .)).

A tempo (or metric) modulation causes a change in the hierarchical relationship between the perceived beat subdivision and all potential subdivisions belonging to the new tempo. Benadon has explored some compositional uses of tempo modulations, such as tempo networks and beat subdivision spaces.

Three challenges arise when performing metric modulations:

1. Grouping notes of the same speed differently on each side of the barline, ex: (quintuplet =sextuplet) with sixteenth notes before and after the barline
2. Subdivision used on one side of the barline and not the other, ex: (triplet =) with triplets before and quarter notes after the barline
3. Subdivision used on neither side of the barline but used to establish the modulation, ex: (quintuplet =) with quarter notes before and after the barline

Examples of the use of metric modulation include Carter's Cello Sonata (1948), A Symphony of Three Orchestras (1976), and Björk's "Desired Constellation" (.=). Beethoven used metric modulation in his Trio for 2 oboes & English horn, Op. 87, 1794.

== Score notation ==
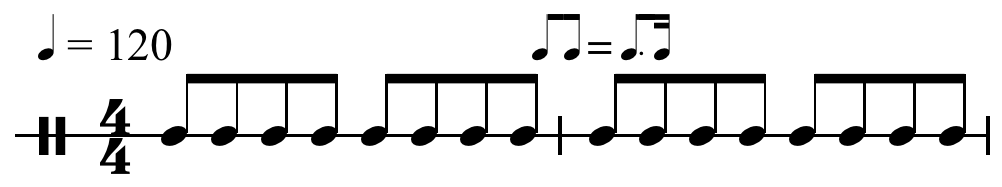
Metric modulation marking used to indicate a change to swing rhythm

Metric modulations are generally notated as 'note value' = 'note value'. For example,

=

This notation is also normally followed by the new tempo in parentheses.

Before the modern concept and notation of metric modulations composers used the terms doppio piu mosso and doppio piu lento for double and half-speed, and later markings such as:

(Adagio)=(Allegro)

indicating double speed, which would now be marked (=).

The phrase l'istesso tempo was used for what may now be notated with metric modulation markings. For example: 2/4 to 6/8 (=.), will be marked l'istesso tempo, indicating the beat is the same speed.

== See also ==
- Tuplet
