= Percussion concerto =

Musical work for a solo percussionist and ensemble

A percussion concerto is a type of musical composition for a percussion soloist and a large ensemble, such as a concert band or orchestra. Usually, percussion concertos require the soloist to play a vast array of percussion instruments in a complicated setup (also known as multi-percussion), but it is also common for pieces to highlight just one percussion instrument, as seen in timpani concertos and marimba concertos.

While percussion concertos have been written from as early as the 1930s, they grew in popularity from the 1990s onwards. This coincides with the presence of the percussionists Colin Currie and Evelyn Glennie, who have separately commissioned and premiered numerous entrees to the repertoire. Other percussionists who have performed and commissioned percussion concertos since include players like Martin Grubinger, Christoph Sietzen, and Claire Edwardes.

== List of percussion concertos ==
=== Multi-percussion concertos ===
- Kalevi Aho
  - Sieidi (2010)
- John Corigliano
  - Conjurer (2007)
- Michael Daugherty
  - UFO (1999)
  - Dreamachine (2014)
- Avner Dorman
  - Spices, Perfumes, Toxins! (2006)
  - Frozen in Time (2007)
  - Eternal Rhythm (2018)
  - In Flux (2024)
- Tan Dun
  - Water Concerto (1998)
  - Paper Concerto (2003)
  - Earth Concerto (2009)
  - The Tears of Nature (2012)
- Péter Eötvös
  - Speaking Drums (2012)
- Helen Grime
  - Percussion Concerto (2018)
- Jennifer Higdon
  - Percussion Concerto (2005)
  - Duo Duel for two percussionists and orchestra (2020)
- Alan Hovhaness
  - Fantasy on Japanese Woodprints (1965)
- André Jolivet
  - Concerto for Percussion (1958)
- James MacMillan
  - Veni, Veni, Emmanuel (1992)
  - Percussion Concerto No. 2 (2014)
- Darius Milhaud
  - Concerto for Percussion and Small Orchestra (1929-1930)
  - Concerto for Marimba, Vibraphone and Orchestra (1947)
- Thea Musgrave
  - Wood, Metal and Skin (2004)
- Einojuhani Rautavaara
  - Incantations (2008)
- Ned Rorem
  - Mallet Concerto (2003)
- Christopher Rouse
  - Der gerettete Alberich (1997)
- Fazıl Say
  - Percussion Concerto
- Joseph Schwantner
  - Percussion Concerto (1995)
- Steven Stucky
  - Spirit Voices (2003)
- Tōru Takemitsu
  - Cassiopeia (1971)
  - From me flows what you call Time for five percussionists and orchestra (1990)
- Joan Tower
  - Strike Zones (2001)
- Carl Vine
  - Percussion Concerto (1987)
  - Symphony No. 5 Percussion Symphony for four percussionists and orchestra (1995)
- Chen Yi
  - Percussion Concerto (1998)
