= Atlanta School of Composers =

The Atlanta School of Composers is a group of contemporary classical music composers championed by Atlanta Symphony Orchestra and conductor Robert Spano through performances, recordings, and commissions. Members of the group include Jennifer Higdon, Christopher Theofanidis, Osvaldo Golijov, and Michael Gandolfi, with Adam Schoenberg added in June 2010. Works from the group including the following:

- The Here and Now by Theofanidis – recorded in 2003
- Concerto for Orchestra and City Scape by Higdon – recorded in 2004
- The opera Ainadamar by Golijov – recorded in 2006
- Garden of Cosmic Speculation by Gandolfi – performed in May 2007 and recorded that same year
- Oceana by Golijov – recorded in 2007
- Dooryard Bloom by Higdon – recorded in 2009
- On a Wire by Higdon and QED: Engaging Richard Feynman by Gandolfi – premiered together in June 2010
