= Frozen in Time =

Frozen in Time may refer to:

- Frozen in Time (album), a 2005 album by American death metal band Obituary
- Frozen in Time (novel), a 2009 novel by Ali Sparks
- Frozen in Time: An Epic Story of Survival and a Modern Quest for Lost Heroes of World War II, a 2013 book by Mitchell Zuckoff
- Frozen in Time: The Fate of the Franklin Expedition, a 1987 book by Owen Beattie and John Geiger
- Frozen in Time (Dorman), a concerto by Avner Dorman
- Frozen in Time, a stunt performed by David Blaine
- Frozen in Time, a 2021 album by American band Ace of Hearts
