= Duo Duel =

Double percussion concerto by Jennifer Higdon

Duo Duel is a concerto for two percussionists and orchestra written in 2020 by the American composer Jennifer Higdon. The work was commissioned by the Houston Symphony for the percussionists Svet Stoyanov and Matthew Strauss, to whom it is dedicated. Its world premiere was given by Stoyanov, Strauss, and the Houston Symphony conducted by Robert Spano at Jones Hall, Houston, on May 6, 2022.

== Composition ==
Duo Duel was written between February 2020 and its completion on June 11, 2020. The concerto is cast in one continuous movement divided into three sections in the traditional fast–slow–fast form and lasts about 24 minutes.

=== Instrumentation ===
The work is scored for two soli percussionists and an orchestra comprising two flutes, two oboes, two clarinets, two bassoons, four horns, three trumpets, two trombones, bass trombone, tuba, timpani, one additional percussionist, harp, and strings. The soli percussion battery comprises only pitched percussion and consists of a shared vibraphone and marimba plus individual sets of crotales and three timpani each.

== Reception ==
Duo Duel has been praised by music critics. Azusa Ueno of The Classic Review wrote that the piece "takes us through a sonic wonderland with two percussion soloists guiding the way," adding, "Despite the mélange of colors and textures, nothing sounds muddled or confused: part of it has to do with Higdon's writing, which at its most sensitive is beautifully layered and nuanced. It is, however, also the performers who do a fantastic job of bringing out small soloistic accents where necessary all while paying consistent attention to detail and clarity." She concluded, "Stoyanov and Strauss bring to life what Higdon describes as a musical 'duel': the parts are written in such a way to make it seem like they are trying to outdo each other, and this makes for a thrilling and suspenseful listen." Giorgio Koukl of EarRelevant similarly wrote, "Higdon uses the percussion in a rather traditional way, rarely using special playing techniques, except for using a string instrument bow to play the vibraphone. Still, even with this self-imposed limitation, we get a score that is never boring and successfully obtains an ever-changing carpet of colors."

== Recording ==
A recording of Duo Duel, performed by Stoyanov, Strauss, and the Houston Symphony conducted by Robert Spano, was released on album together with Higdon's Concerto for Orchestra through Naxos on August 11, 2023.

== See also ==
- List of compositions by Jennifer Higdon
