= Dialogues (Carter) =

Composition by Elliott Carter

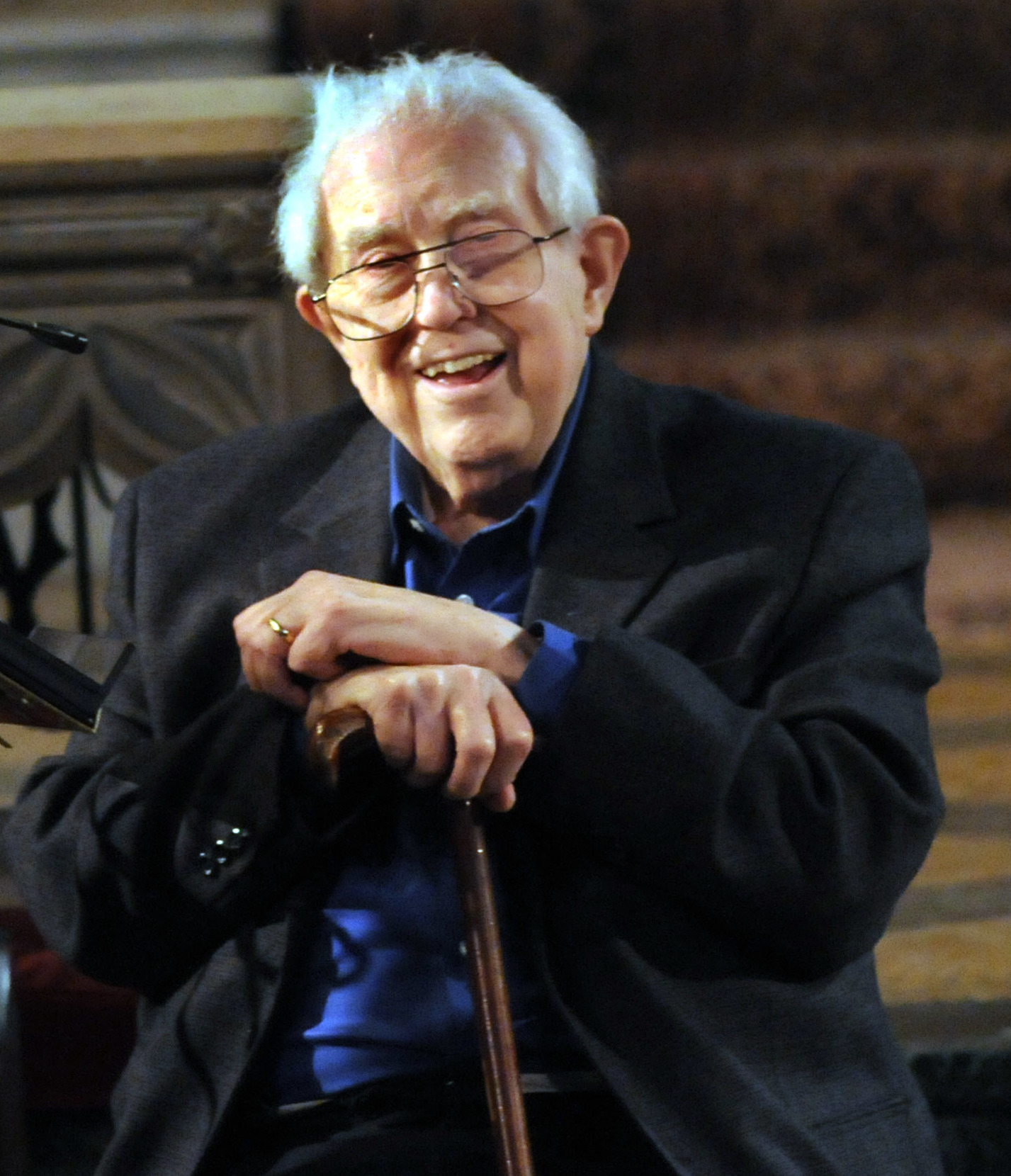
Elliott Carter in 2007

Dialogues is a composition for solo piano and chamber orchestra by the American composer Elliott Carter. The work was commissioned by the BBC for the pianist Nicolas Hodges and completed in 2003. It was first performed on January 23, 2004 at the Queen Elizabeth Hall in Southbank Centre, London, by Nicolas Hodges and the London Sinfonietta under the conductor Oliver Knussen. The piece was a finalist for the 2005 Pulitzer Prize for Music. In 2012, Carter composed a followup to the piece Dialogues II for the conductor Daniel Barenboim's 70th birthday.

== Composition ==
Dialogues has a duration of roughly 14 minutes and is composed in a single movement. Carter briefly described the piece in the score program notes, writing, "Dialogues for piano and chamber orchestra is a conversation between the soloist and the orchestra: responding to each other, sometimes interrupting the other, or arguing. The single varied movement is entirely derived from a small group of harmonies and rhythms."

=== Instrumentation ===
The work is scored for a solo piano and a chamber orchestra comprising flute (doubling piccolo), oboe (doubling cor anglais), clarinet, bassoon (doubling contrabassoon), two horns, trumpet, trombone, and strings.

== Reception ==
Reviewing the work's North American premiere in Chicago, Michael Cameron of the Chicago Tribune praised Dialogues, writing, "A conflict was established between the percussive piano and the winds and strings, with their ability to emerge imperceptibly from silence. Indeed, silence versus sound, and its variant, long versus short, seemed to be one of Carter's many constructed dualities." He added, "The composer has remained true to his atonal language over the years, but here, and in other recent works, an added clarity of purpose has come to the fore, setting his multiple dialogues in a more transparent light." Anne Midgette of The New York Times compared the piece favorably to Carter's Three Illusions for Orchestra, writing, "Dialogues for piano and orchestra, from 2003, is a tougher piece of episodic exchanges between soloist and orchestra in which, as in a real dialogue, communication is imperfect and sometimes one-sided." K. Smith of Gramophone also lauded the piece, remarking:

At first glance, Dialogues (2003) would seem to be in the old Carter model, where different musical lines unfold with such clearly delineated personalities that they’re often compared to characters in a play. Carter describes the piece as a conversation between piano and orchestra, but the lively discourse continues with little of his former abrasiveness. This is civilised cocktail chatter rather than a raucous town meeting, with musical points respecting each other’s space rather than yelling each other down.
