= Michael Gandolfi =

American composer

Gandolfi in front of Roger Kizik's painting, A Confederacy of Dunces

Michael James Gandolfi (born July 5, 1956) is an American composer of contemporary classical music. He chairs the composition department at the New England Conservatory of Music (NEC).

Gandolfi was born in Melrose, Massachusetts. He taught himself guitar as a child, studied for a year at the Berklee College of Music, and then entered NEC, where he earned his bachelor's and master's degrees.

In 1986, he was a Fellow at the Tanglewood Music Center, where he studied with Leonard Bernstein and Oliver Knussen. He has served on the faculty of Harvard University, Indiana University, and the Phillips Academy at Andover. He was composer in residence with the New England Philharmonic from 1997-2000.

Since 1997, Gandolfi has been the coordinator for the Tanglewood Music Center's composition department.

He has been championed by conductor Robert Spano as one of the "Atlanta School" of American composers, a group that includes Osvaldo Golijov, Jennifer Higdon, Christopher Theofanidis and Adam Schoenberg. Gandolfi's music often contains rock and jazz elements. He sometimes looks to the sciences for his subject matter.

His The Garden of Cosmic Speculation was inspired by Charles Jencks' garden in Scotland that incorporates modern physics into its design. It was nominated for Best Contemporary Classical Composition at the 2009 Grammy Awards, His Trivia, written for the Weilerstein Trio, uses Richard Wolfson's book Simply Einstein as a source.

Gandolfi has also written a significant amount of children's music, including a setting of Carlo Collodi's 1949 version of the Pinocchio story.

His works have been performed by the Boston Symphony Orchestra, Atlanta Symphony Orchestra, The New World Symphony, the Houston Symphony Orchestra, the Boston Modern Orchestra Project, BBC Scottish Symphony Orchestra, and many others.

Gandolfi resides in Cambridge, Massachusetts, and is a member of ASCAP.
