= Creation/Creator =

Creation/Creator is an oratorio for soprano, mezzo-soprano, tenor, baritone, bass, chorus, and orchestra by the American composer Christopher Theofanidis. The work was commissioned by the Atlanta Symphony Orchestra and was first performed on April 23, 2015, by the soprano Jessica Rivera, mezzo-soprano Kelley O'Connor, tenor Thomas Cooley, baritone Nmon Ford, bass Evan Boyer, the actors Steven Cole and Shannon Eubanks, and the Atlanta Symphony Chorus and Orchestra under the conductor Robert Spano.

== Composition ==
Creation/Creator has a duration of 81 minutes and is composed in 15 movements:

1. Elephant in the Dark
2. God-Tapestry
3. Pan Gu and the Egg-Shaped Cloud
4. An Unknown Woman
5. Poets of Science
6. Laboratories of the Universe
7. In the Eternal
8. This Dream, Strange and Moving
9. Two Girls
10. Ms. Margaret Cavendish
11. Between Green Thread and Broccoli
12. The Creation
13. An Angel in the Marble
14. The Music it Makes
15. All Things Bound in a Single Book

The music combines elements rock and roll, world music, and classical music. The text of the piece is drawn from various sources, including the legend of Pangu from Chinese mythology and the works of the American author James Weldon Johnson.

=== Instrumentation ===
The work calls for soprano, mezzo-soprano, tenor, baritone, bass solos, actor, actress, mixed choir, and an orchestra of two flutes (second doubling piccolo), two oboes (second doubling cor anglais), three clarinets (second doubling alto saxophone, third doubling bass clarinet), two bassoons (second doubling contrabassoon), four horns, three trumpets, three trombones, tuba, harp, electric guitar, electric bass, synthesizer, timpani, percussion, and strings.

== Reception ==
Reviewing the world premiere performance, Mark Gresham of ArtsATL highly praised the piece, writing, "Theofanidis may well have himself a landmark work in Creation/Creator. It is only superficially akin to Haydn's Creation in theme as an oratorio. While Haydn's work dealt with human creativity only as a subtext to the Biblical creation story, it is central to Theofanidis' oratorio. If considered only from a point of the composer's choices of texts alone, it is a work that will spark the interest of contemporary audiences."
