= Concerto 4-3 =

2007 concerto by Jennifer Higdon

Concerto 4-3 is a concerto for two violins, double bass, and orchestra in three movements by the American composer Jennifer Higdon. The work was commissioned for the string trio Time for Three by the Philadelphia Orchestra, the Pittsburgh Symphony Orchestra, and the Wheeling Symphony Orchestra. It was first performed in Philadelphia on January 10, 2008, by Time for Three and the Philadelphia Orchestra conducted by Christoph Eschenbach.

== Composition ==
=== Background ===
Concerto 4-3 blends elements of bluegrass music with traditional classical music. The title is a word play on the fact that the piece was written for the string trio Time for Three. Additionally, the movements are titled after rivers in the Great Smoky Mountains of Tennessee, where Higdon first experienced bluegrass music in her youth.

=== Structure ===
Concerto 4-3 has a duration of roughly 20 minutes and is composed in three movements:

1. The Shallows
2. Little River
3. Roaring Smokies

=== Instrumentation ===
The work is scored for a soli trio of two violins and double bass and an orchestra comprising two flutes, two oboes, two clarinets, two bassoons, four French horns, three trumpets, three trombones, tuba, timpani, two percussionists, and strings.

== Reception ==
Joe Banno of The Washington Post called Concerto 4-3 "a punchy, engaging work" and wrote, "Not a particularly deep or groundbreaking piece, it's essentially a hunk of feel-good, neo-romantic Americana by a composer with a sharp mind and a persuasive way with orchestral color." John von Rhein of the Chicago Tribune also praised the piece, writing, "[Higdon] finds ingenious ways to integrate [the soloists] with the orchestra while allowing their personalities to shape and color the musical dialogue." Anthony Tommasini of The New York Times similarly described it as a "restless, appealing piece" and wrote, "These virtuosic young players bill themselves as the world’s first 'classically trained garage band.' Ms. Higdon treats them as such in this 25-minute concerto, inspired by the folk music and bluegrass of the Smoky Mountains in Tennessee, where she grew up."

Despite noting that the work first struck him as "superficial and stingy on the orchestral portion," Tim Smith of The Baltimore Sun ultimately conceded that "the sheer energy of it all proved irresistible." Lewis Whittington of Broad Street Review wrote, "The rustic ambience Higdon conjures is a bursting tonal landscape, every bit as evocative and transporting as the urbane metropolitan tour she offered in her 2004 work, City Scapes (sic)."

== See also ==
- List of compositions by Jennifer Higdon
