= Symphony No. 1 (Theofanidis) =

The Symphony is an orchestral composition in four movements by the American composer Christopher Theofanidis. It was commissioned by the Atlanta Symphony Orchestra, which premiered the work under the conductor Robert Spano in April 2009. The piece is dedicated to Robert Spano "in admiration and friendship."

== Composition ==
The symphony has a duration of roughly 35 minutes and is composed in four numbered movements. The first movement has a duration of roughly 12 minutes; in the program notes, Theofanidis described it and the fourth movement as "the big pillars of the piece, both emotionally and in scale." The second movement has a duration of roughly 8 minutes and was described by the composer as "quite lyrical, but not slow." The third movement is a brief scherzo-ritornello with a duration of only about 4 minutes. The final movement has a duration of roughly 10 minutes; the composer described its relation to the opening movement, writing:

The first movement and last movement both hinge on two contrasting types of energies—in the first movement, the feeling is joyous but occasionally takes turns into a slightly out-of-control version of itself. The last movement is quite dark and monolithic in character, but is occasionally tormented by flashes of light and beauty. I saw these two movements as mirror opposites of each other. The first is mostly quite fast, the last has a certain breadth and grandeur with some occasional faster music.

== Reception ==
Reviewing a 2011 recording of the symphony, Jeff Dunn of the San Francisco Classical Voice wrote, "Listeners will find [Theofanidis's] Texas toast of a Symphony No. 1 an instantly engaging experience." He added, "Throughout, the music will keep you upright in your seat and as happy as if you'd just watched another Bourne Identity action flick. Whether you'll want to immerse yourself in further hearings, however, is a matter of taste." Pierre Ruhe of ArtsATL opined, "There's much to admire, from its earnestness and craftsmanship to its engagement with a large canvas. Theofanidis' symphony takes a Mahlerian view that the orchestra can express everything, which is filtered through symphonic Hollywood, from John Williams to Tan Dun, with a heavy use (or overuse) of percussion for grandiose effect." Joshua Kosman of the San Francisco Chronicle also praised the work, writing:

Theofanidis' great knack is to write music out of fairly familiar harmonic and rhythmic building blocks, yet have it come out sounding fresh and provocative. Aside from the lack of a slow movement, the four-movement structure of his First Symphony is traditional - it's bolstered by two large and energetic outer movements, with scherzo-like interludes in between. The opening, which seems to be channeling memories of Scottish bagpipes, is the symphony's most fascinating movement, built around two crisply delineated themes that fall gratefully on the ear. Theofanidis spices up his tonal harmonies with enough surprises to keep things moving, and the orchestral writing is first rate; only the square-cut phrasing, with most gestures returning in predictable groups of four, wears thin.

== Recording ==
A recording of the symphony, performed by Robert Spano and the Atlanta Symphony Orchestra, was released through the orchestra's label ASO Media on June 28, 2011.
