= List of compositions by Jennifer Higdon =

List of compositions by Jennifer Higdon. All works are in alphabetical order.

== Opera ==
- Cold Mountain: (premiered The Santa Fe Opera, 1 August 2015)
- Woman With Eyes Closed: (premiered Pittsburgh Opera, April 2025)

== Chamber ==
Flute

- Amazing Grace
- Autumn Reflection
- DASH
- The Jeffrey Mode
- Legacy
- Lullaby
- Mountain Songs
- Music Box of Light
- rapid.fire (for solo flute)
- running the edgE
- Song (for solo flute)
- Steeley Pause
- Trio Song
- Wedding Hymn

Mixed Instrumentation

- Autumn Music
- Ceremonies
- Ceremonies Suite
- Dark Wood
- Dash
- Music Box of Light
- Piano Trio
- Quiet Art
- Scenes from the Poet's Dreams
- Smash
- Soliloquy
- Sonata for Viola and Piano
- String Poetic
- String Trio
- Summer Shimmers
- Trio Songs
- Trumpet Songs
- wissahickon poeTrees
- Zaka
- Zango Bandango

Clarinet and ensemble

- Celestial Hymns
- DASH
- Light Refracted
- Soliloquy

String quartets

- Amazing Grace
- An Exaltation of Larks
- Impressions
- Sky Quartet
- Southern Harmony
- Voices

Saxophone

- Bop
- Lullaby
- Sax Sonata
- Short Stories

Percussion

- Like Clockwork
- Splendid Wood
- ZONES

Piano and piano ensemble

- Bentley Roses
- Piano Trio (2003)
- Piano Trio Color Through (2016)
- Scenes from the Poet's Dreams
- Secret & Glass Gardens (for solo piano)
- Summer Shimmers

== Choral ==
- Deep in the Night (1997)
- O magnum mysterium (2002)
- On the Death of the Righteous (2009)
- A Quiet Moment (1999)
- Sanctus (2001)
- Sing, Sing (1999)
- The Singing Rooms (2007)
- somewhere i have never travelled, gladly beyond (2006)
- Southern Grace (1998)
- The Singing Art (2004)
- Voice of the Bard (2005)

== Vocal ==
- Bentley Roses
- breaking
- Dooryard Bloom
- Falling
- Hop and Toe Dance
- In Our Quiet
- Lullaby
- Morning Opens
- Notes on Love
- Red
- Threaded
- To Home
- Wedding Hymn

== Orchestral ==
- All Things Majestic (2011)
- blue cathedral (1999)
- Celebration Fanfare (2003)
- City Scape (2002)
- Concerto 4-3 (2007)
- Concerto for Orchestra (2002)
- Dance Card (2015)
- Dooryard Bloom (2004)
- Duo Duel (Double Percussion Concerto) (2020)
- Fanfare Ritmico (1999)
- Harp Concerto (2018)
- Light (2006)
- The Light That We Can Hear (Flute Concerto) (2022)
- Loco (2004)
- Low Brass Concerto (2017)
- Machine (2003)
- Mandolin Concerto (2021)
- Oboe Concerto (2005)
- On a Wire (2010)
- On the Death of the Righteous (2009)
- Percussion Concerto (2005)
- Piano Concerto (2006)
- Shine (1995)
- The Singing Rooms (2007)
- Soliloquy (1989)
- Soprano Sax Concerto (2007)
- Spirit (2006)
- To the Point (2004)
- Trombone Concerto (2005)
- Tuba Concerto (2017)
- Viola Concerto (2015)
- Violin Concerto (2008) - recipient of a 2010 Pulitzer Prize, written for and played by Hilary Hahn
- Wind Shear (2000)

== String orchestra ==
- Celebration Fanfare
- "String" from Concerto for Orchestra
- To The Point

== Wind ensemble and band ==
- Fanfare Ritmico (2002)
- Kelly's Field (2006)
- Oboe Concerto—arranged for solo oboe and wind ensemble (2008)
- Percussion Concerto—arranged for solo percussion and wind ensemble (2009)
- Rhythm Stand (2004)
- Road Stories (2010)
- Soprano Sax Concerto—arranged for solo soprano sax and wind ensemble (2009)
