= Leah Lax =

American author (born 1956)

- Born: 1955 or 1956 (age 69–70)
- Education: University of Houston; MFA, Creative Writing
- Website: leahlaxauthor.com

Leah Lax (born 1956) is an American author and librettist. She is best known for her memoir Uncovered: How I Left Hasidic Life and Finally Came Home which was later developed as an opera with composer Lori Laitman.

== Biography ==
Lax was born in 1955 or 1956, and grew up in Dallas, Texas. She joined the Lubavitcher Hasidim at sixteen. In 1975, Lax entered an arranged marriage at the age of 19, and remained among the Hasidim for thirty years, bearing seven children. In 2002 she left the community to lead a secular life and live openly as a lesbian. Subsequently, Lax graduated from the University of Houston with an MFA in Creative Writing. She had completed her undergraduate studies at the University of Texas at Austin.

== Career ==
Her interest in writing started while reading anthologies by feminist and lesbian poet Adrienne Rich. Lax started writing in earnest after she underwent a secret abortion to terminate a life-threatening pregnancy. In 2007 Lax co-wrote The Refuge for the Houston Grand Opera with composer Christopher Theofanidis debuted at Houston's Wortham Center. In 2013, she created and designed Houston's In Concert Against Hate for the Houston Symphony In collaboration with the Anti-Defamation League, In 2020, Lax created an opera Uncovered with composer Lori Laitman and director/dramatist Beth Greenberg. Lax wrote the libretto based on her memoir Uncovered: How I Left Hasidic Life and Finally Came Home, narrating thirty years as a Hasidic wife, mother, and closeted lesbian.

Uncovered was named Redbook Magazine's "Best of 2015".
