= Fanfare Ritmico =

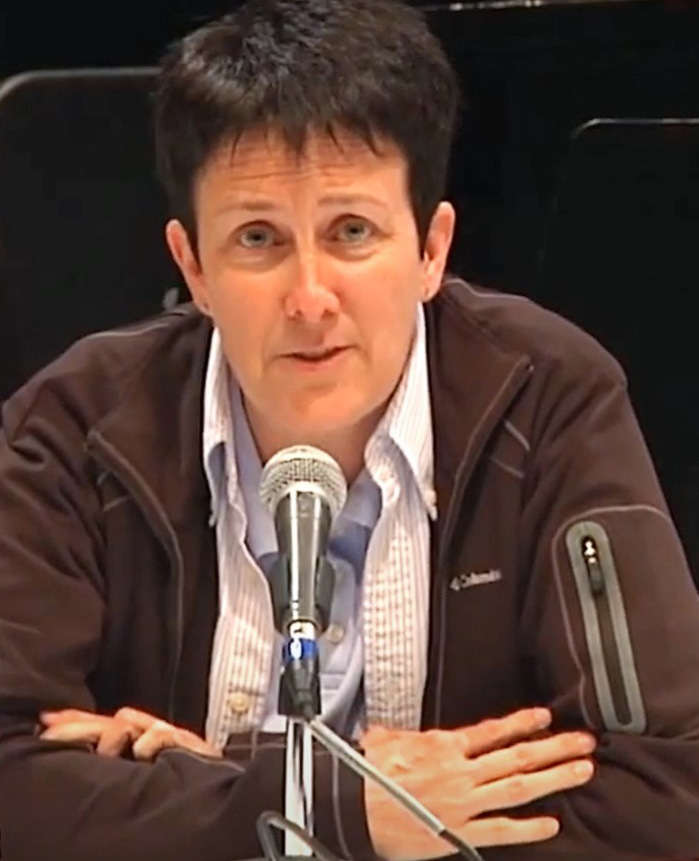
Jennifer Higdon in 2014

Fanfare Ritmico is a single-movement orchestral composition by the American composer Jennifer Higdon. The work was commissioned by The Women's Philharmonic as part of The Fanfares Project. It was given its world premiere in March 2000 by conductor Apo Hsu and the Women's Philharmonic.

== Composition ==
Fanfare Ritmico has a duration of roughly 6 minutes and is composed in a single movement. Higdon conceived the piece as a celebration of the "rhythm and speed" of life, writing in the score program notes:

Writing this work on the eve of the move into the new Millennium, I found myself reflecting on how all things have quickened as time has progressed. Our lives now move at speeds much greater than what I believe anyone would have ever imagined in years past. Everyone follows the beat of their own drummer, and those drummers are beating faster and faster on many different levels. As we move along day to day, rhythm plays an integral part of our lives, from the individual heartbeat to the lightning speed of our computers. This fanfare celebrates that rhythmic motion, of man and machine, and the energy which permeates every moment of our being in the new century.

=== Instrumentation ===
The work is scored for an orchestra comprising three flutes (3rd doubling piccolo), three oboes, two clarinets, bass clarinet, two bassoons, contrabassoon, four French horns, three trumpets, three trombones, tuba, timpani, four percussionists, harp, piano, and strings.

== Reception ==
Reviewing the world premiere, Joshua Kosman of the San Francisco Chronicle praised Fanfare Ritmico, remarking:

The world premiere of Jennifer Higdon's zippy, enchanting Fanfare Ritmico started the concert off with a bang. Written for the orchestra as one of a series of commissioned fanfares, Higdon's score is a brisk, sharp-edged concoction, full of rhythmic pizzazz and blunt orchestral writing (aside from one splendidly played solo for the concertmaster). Hsu led the orchestra in a magnificent performance.

Allan Kozinn of The New York Times similarly described the piece as "tonal and flashy, with dense, demanding brass and percussion writing". Anne Midgette called it "exuberant" and "a flourish of sound that opens by running across the percussion in the back of the orchestra, from right to left, like a stereophonic effect, and then blooms through the orchestra." Tim Sawyier of the Chicago Classical Review also lauded the composition, writing, "The propulsive percussion section was dynamic throughout, and the trumpet and flute flourishes nimbly executed."

David Bratman of the San Francisco Classical Voice wrote:

Higdon's compositional secret is a strong sense of musical structure. Even a chaotic piece like this one, a tossed salad of echoes of numerous different styles, still manages to hang together. The scoring is built on percussion (thundering timpani and various other drums open the work) but the spotlight passes all over the orchestra, even to violin solos. As a composer whose orchestral style naturally tends to the bright, brittle, and brassy, Higdon was a good choice to contribute to the Fanfares Project...

== See also ==
- List of compositions by Jennifer Higdon
