= Saxophone Concerto (Higdon) =

21st-century composition by Jennifer Higdon

The Soprano Sax Concerto is a concerto for soprano saxophone and orchestra by the American composer Jennifer Higdon. The work was originally commissioned by the Minnesota Commissioning Club as Higdon's Oboe Concerto and was premiered by oboist Kathy Greenbank and the Saint Paul Chamber Orchestra in 2005. Higdon later reworked the composition, however, and the piece was premiered in its form as a saxophone concerto on August 3, 2007 at the Cabrillo Festival of Contemporary Music by the saxophonist Timothy McAllister and the Cabrillo Festival Orchestra under the conductor Marin Alsop.

== Composition ==
The Soprano Sax Concerto has a duration of roughly 17 minutes and is composed in a single movement. Higdon described her inspiration for the work in the score program notes, writing:

I have always been struck by the range of power and beauty that comes from saxophones. I have seen a sax quartet bring a large school room filled with hundreds of children come to a complete halt with one tutti note. Many people don't realize just how much power exists in this group of instruments, and often they may not realize the potential for beauty. The soprano sax in particular produces a tone of warmth and a real agility that allows it to sing like none of the other instruments in this group. So it seemed fitting when I found myself being approached by several saxophonists, to arrange my "Oboe Concerto" for this instrument. There are not a lot of works for the soprano sax in a concerto format; and the ranges of both oboe and soprano are similar. Because the saxophone has more power to it than an oboe, I thought that this instrument would balance the accompanying ensemble quite well, but give listeners a chance to hear its exquisite beauty.

In a later interview with the San Francisco Chronicle, Higdon described the composition an "airplane-hotel project," remarking, "I had the piece on my laptop, and I could work on it while I was sitting in a lobby or an airport terminal. The orchestral part stayed the same; it was just a matter of changing some of the solo notes."

=== Instrumentation ===
The work is scored for a solo soprano saxophone and an orchestra comprising two flutes (2nd doubling piccolo), oboe (doubling English horn), two clarinets, two bassoons, two French horns, two trumpets, one percussionist, and strings.

== Reception ==
Reviewing the world premiere, Jeff Dunn of the San Francisco Classical Voice praised the concerto, writing, "This was a rewrite of her 2005 Oboe Concerto (which I have not heard), and it was superbly realized by soloist Timothy McAllister. Higdon is now the most-performed living composer in the U.S. and Canada — deservedly so. Her melodic and orchestration skills are formidable, and she can reach audiences without having to pander to them." He added, "The single-movement concerto consisted of long stretches of ever-evolving melisma, with phrases cleverly imitated by other solo instruments in a way that seemed to weave a tapestry to the glory of melody. This work, and perhaps the oboe concerto as well, is a significant testament to beauty." The conductor Marin Alsop, who gave the Soprano Sax Concerto its world premiere, described the piece as "a lyrical and poignant essay for sax and orchestra".

== See also ==
- List of compositions by Jennifer Higdon
