= The Singing Rooms =

The Singing Rooms is a concerto for solo violin, choir, and orchestra by the American composer Jennifer Higdon. The work was jointly commissioned by the Philadelphia Orchestra, the Atlanta Symphony Orchestra, and the Minnesota Orchestra. It was first performed on January 17, 2008, in Philadelphia by the violinist Jennifer Koh, The Philadelphia Singers, and the Philadelphia Orchestra under the conductor Christoph Eschenbach. The text of the piece is set to poems by Jeanne Minahan. The piece was performed in March 2019 at the Kimmel Center for Performing Arts in Philadelphia by the Temple University Choirs and Orchestra, with a featured violin soloist. The piece's most recent notable performance was in August 2025 at the Jay Pritzker Pavilion in Chicago's Millennium Park with The Grant Park Music Festival Orchestra and Chorus, with Jennifer Koh returning as violin soloist.

== Composition ==
=== Text ===
When first commissioned to write a violin concerto with a choral element, Higdon began searching for poetry on which to set the composition. She wrote in the score program notes:

To create the best form for the piece, I needed a group of poems that would not be too long (because I wanted to create different moods within this large work), and that would fit together somehow thematically. I looked for a long time, through poetry from various countries and time periods. But I discovered that sometimes the answer is in your own backyard: walking through the faculty lounge at Curtis one day, I asked Jeanne Minahan, the head of the Liberal Arts Department (who happens to be a poet) if she had anything that I could read. When I got some books of her poetry in my hands, I knew I had found what I was looking for... a series of poems, that resonated with me, and would provide different emotional settings, as if they were lessons in life arranged like different rooms within a house.

=== Structure ===
The Singing Rooms has a duration of roughly 37 minutes and is composed in seven movements set to the text of poems by Jeanne Minahan:

1. Three Windows: Two Versions of the Day
2. Things Aren't Always
3. The Interpretation of Dreams
4. Confession
5. History Lesson
6. A Word with God
7. Three Windows: Two Versions of the Day

=== Instrumentation ===
The work is scored for solo violin, SATB chorus, and an orchestra comprising two flutes, two oboes (2nd doubling English horn), two clarinets, two bassoons, four horns, three trumpets (1st doubling piccolo trumpet), three trombones, tuba, harp, timpani, two percussionists, and strings.

== Reception ==
Howard Goldstein of BBC Music Magazine praised The Singing Rooms, writing, "Higdon [...] often lets the poems take a backseat to the concerto-like solo violin part (beautifully played by Jennifer Koh), resulting in a lavishness of musical gesture occasionally at odds with the intimate subject matter." Bradley Bambarger of The Star-Ledger compared the work favorably to Higdon's Violin Concerto, despite noting that "it still tends to be melodically anodyne."

== See also ==
- List of compositions by Jennifer Higdon
