= The Ring of Fire and Love =

Orchestral work by Outi Tarkiainen

The Ring of Fire and Love is an orchestral composition written in 2020 by the Finnish composer Outi Tarkiainen. The work was commissioned by the Royal Stockholm Philharmonic Orchestra, which performed the world premiere under the conductor Sakari Oramo at the Stockholm Concert Hall, Stockholm, on 18 March 2021. The piece is dedicated to Sakari Oramo.

== Composition ==
The Ring of Fire and Love last about 9 minutes and is cast in a single movement. The piece is named after the Ring of Fire—a volcanic belt surrounding the Pacific Ocean in which most of the world's earthquakes occur. "Ring of fire" also refers the phenomenon that takes place during a solar eclipse when the moon blocks all but the outside ring of the sun. Additionally, as the composer wrote in the score program note, "the same expression is also used to describe what a woman feels when, as she gives birth, the baby's head passes through her pelvis. That moment is the most dangerous in the baby's life, its little skull being subjected to enormous pressure, preparing it for life in a way unlike any other." She concluded, "The Ring of Fire and Love is a work for orchestra about this earth-shattering, creative, cataclysmic moment they travel through together."

=== Instrumentation ===
The work is scored for an orchestra comprising two flutes (both doubling piccolo), two oboes, two clarinets (2nd doubling bass clarinet), two bassoons, four horns, two trumpets, two trombones, bass trombone, tuba, timpani, three percussionists, harp, celesta, and strings.

== Reception ==
Reviewing a performance by the Minnesota Orchestra, Rob Hubbard of the Star Tribune described The Ring of Fire and Love as "an intriguingly atmospheric piece, with dark menacing murmurs transcended by some Miles Davis-esque muted trumpet." The music journalist Jari Kallio similarly observed, "the nine-minute score opens with buzzing oscillations for full orchestra, clad in extraordinary colours and textures. These initial turbulences are cooled down gradually over the next sixty-or-so bars, paving the way for a contemplative solo for muted trumpet. The opening material reappears for further permutations, subsequently bridging into the captivating closing tableau; an extended meditation for the trumpet soloist and orchestra, conceived in the most refined textures."
