= On the Death of the Righteous =

2009 composition by Jennifer Higdon

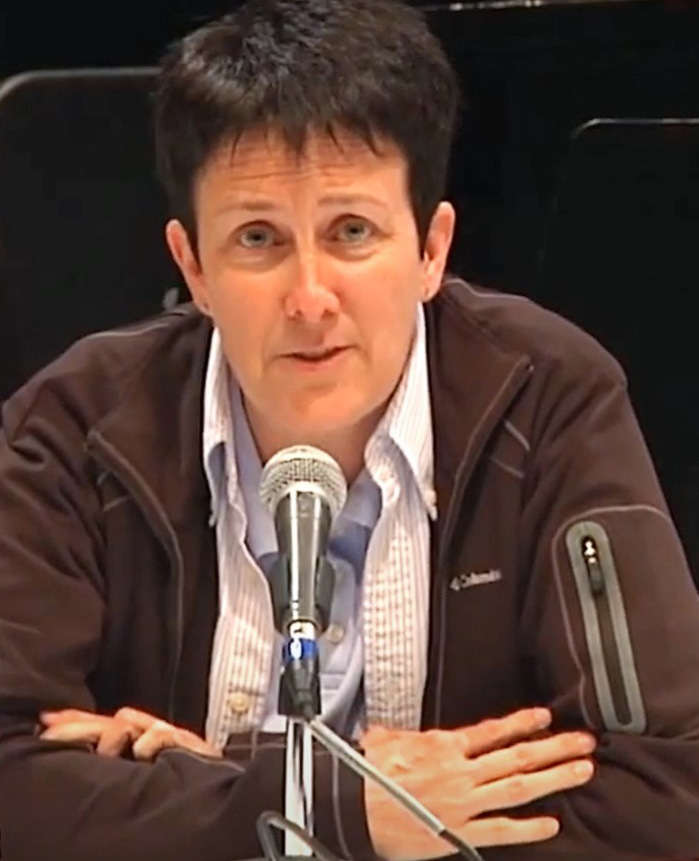
Jennifer Higdon in 2014

On the Death of the Righteous is a composition for choir and orchestra set to the text of John Donne by the American composer Jennifer Higdon. The work was commissioned by the Mendelssohn Club in 2009 to celebrate Alan Harler's 20th season as their music director. The piece was first performed on March 29, 2009, by the Mendelssohn Club orchestra and choir under the conductor Alan Harler.

== Composition ==
On the Death of the Righteous has a duration of roughly 12 minutes and is composed in a single movement. The music is set to text from the sermons of the 16th-century poet John Donne. In the score program notes, Higdon wrote:

Finding a text to be a part of a piece that would share a program with Verdi's "Requiem" was an interesting challenge, and led me to the works of John Donne, a 16th-century poet and preacher. I realized I needed something that would respect a requiem’s definition, which is to be a mass for the dead. Coming upon Mr. Donne's sermons, I discovered a particular text that describes the non-judgmental quality of a death of one who is righteous... this seemed an appropriate emotional angle to precede a requiem.

She continued, "Of course, the challenge for the composer is creating an emotional state that is equal to the text’s, and thus a music of enough weight and seriousness, without being particularly dark; to be lacking in judgment in musical sound and to reflect the even balance of opposites, upon the death of the righteous."

=== Instrumentation ===
The work is scored for SATB chorus and an orchestra comprising three flutes (third doubling piccolo), two oboes, two clarinets, four bassoons, four horns, five trumpets, three piccolo trumpets, three trombones, tuba, timpani, one percussionist, and strings.

== Reception ==
Reviewing the world premiere, Daniel Webster of The Philadelphia Inquirer lauded, "Higdon faced a huge problem: How to compete with Verdi? Her solution was studied, but also (probably) joyfully indulgent. She had at her disposal Verdi's orchestra with massive percussion, expanded winds, and all the trumpets of heaven." Webster added, "In a sense she did not compete, but found in John Donne's serene musing on death the basis for another mood, another kind of music. That was an impressive achievement, for her music stayed in the ear, even after Verdi's titanic immersion in emotion and color." Reviewing a later recording of the piece, Olivia Giovetti of WQXR-FM similarly wrote:

In Jennifer Higdon's album-opening On the Death of the Righteous, you hear echoes of Verdian splendor with Britten-like modesty, unsurprising on both counts as Higdon wrote the work to accompany the former's Requiem and set it to the text of John Donne, a favorite source material for the latter. However, Higdon's own brand of unsettling sonorities, playful percusiveness and indulgently buoyant musical lines dominate the tone here.

== See also ==
- List of compositions by Jennifer Higdon
