= Piano Concerto (Higdon) =

The Piano Concerto is a concerto for solo piano and orchestra by the American composer Jennifer Higdon. It was commissioned by the National Symphony Orchestra and was first performed December 3, 2009, at the John F. Kennedy Center for the Performing Arts in Washington, D.C. The premiere featured pianist Yuja Wang and the National Symphony Orchestra under conductor Andrew Litton.

== Composition ==
The Piano Concerto has a duration of roughly 30 minutes and is composed in three numbered movements.

=== Instrumentation ===
The work is scored for solo piano and an orchestra comprising two flutes (2nd doubling piccolo), two oboes, two clarinets, two bassoons, four horns, three trumpets, three trombones, tuba, harp, timpani, two percussionists, and strings.

== Reception ==
Reviewing the world premiere, Anne Midgette of The Washington Post called it "a big, meaty, somewhat discursive concerto" and said, "the piece gave one so much to listen to that it flew by, and left one wanting to hear it again, which is no mean feat for a brand-new work." Tim Smith of The Baltimore Sun wrote:

The concerto is big in structure and gesture, with three eventful movements. A soft-hued, rather jazzy keyboard passage sets the work in motion. The piano proceeds to engage in a vigorous dialogue with the orchestra throughout the first movement, which is punctuated by fluttering horn riffs and a striking, march-like theme that makes a few telling appearances. There's a substantial cadenza, and an unexpected, exquisitely subtle ending. On first hearing, the second movement seems a little padded with material, but there are many arresting features as Higdon makes effective use of piquant chromaticism. The finale, in the grand concerto tradition, goes for bravura above all else. It's an exhilarating ride.

Mike Dunham of the Alaska Dispatch News was more critical of the piece, writing, "There's a lot of colorful instrumental combinations, but nothing sticks out — or sticks with the listener. For an often frantically busy piece consuming a half hour or more, there was no sense of transport or journey after the first movement."

== See also ==
- List of compositions by Jennifer Higdon
