= Oboe Concerto (Higdon) =

2005 oboe concerto by Jennifer Higdon

The Oboe Concerto is a concerto for a solo oboe and orchestra by the American composer Jennifer Higdon. The work was commissioned by the Minnesota Commissioning Club and was premiered on September 9, 2005, by the oboist Kathy Greenbank and the Saint Paul Chamber Orchestra. Higdon later reworked the piece into her Soprano Sax Concerto in 2007.

== Composition ==
The Oboe Concerto is composed in a single movement and has a duration of roughly 17 minutes. Higdon described the composition of the piece in the score program notes, writing:

This "Oboe Concerto" gives the instrument a chance to highlight its extraordinary lyrical gift. The beauty of the soaring line intrigued me as a starting point, and then the realization that the oboe makes a great partner for duets within an orchestral texture, sent me in the direction of creating interactions with other instruments in the supporting ensemble.

She added, "I have always thought of the oboe as being a most majestic instrument, and it was a pleasure to be able to create a work that would highlight its beauty and grace."

=== Instrumentation ===
The work is scored for a solo oboe and an orchestra comprising two flutes (2nd doubling piccolo), oboe, English horn, two clarinets, two bassoons, two horns, two trumpets, one percussionist, and strings.

== Reception ==
Reviewing the world premiere, Michael Anthony of the Star Tribune lauded the piece, remarking, "Higdon has written a truly appealing work, the appeal of which is apparent on first hearing." He added:

[Higdon's] Oboe Concerto shares the shimmering beauty and rhythmic playfulness of many of her other works. The concerto, in fact, seems infused with the beauty of its solo instrument. Higdon seems to address that quality. She opens and closes the work with a sustained note in the oboe's middle register. It's a striking opening, as if to say just a single note on this instrument can enchant — and it does.

Higdon herself has regarded the piece as one of her favorites among her own works, alongside blue cathedral and her Concerto for Orchestra.

== See also ==
- List of compositions by Jennifer Higdon
