= Percussion Concerto No. 2 (MacMillan) =

- by James MacMillan
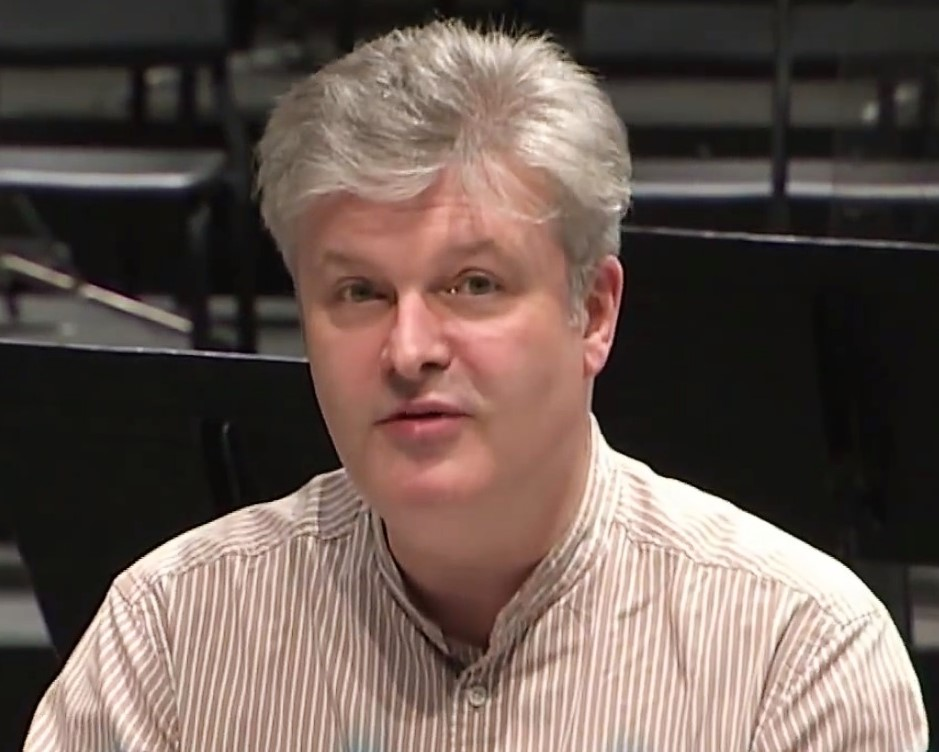
- MacMillan in 2012
- Performed: November 7, 2014: Utrecht, TivoliVredenburg
- Published: 2014: Boosey & Hawkes
- Duration: 25 minutes
- Scoring: Percussion; orchestra

The Percussion Concerto No. 2 is a concerto for solo percussion and orchestra by the Scottish composer James MacMillan. The work was jointly commissioned by the Netherlands Radio Philharmonic, the Philharmonia Orchestra, the Orchestre national du Capitole de Toulouse, the Cabrillo Festival of Contemporary Music, the Baltimore Symphony Orchestra, and the São Paulo State Symphony. It was first performed on November 7, 2014, at TivoliVredenburg in Utrecht, the Netherlands, by percussionist Colin Currie and the Netherlands Radio Philharmonic under conductor James Gaffigan. The composition is MacMillan's second percussion concerto after 1992's Veni, Veni, Emmanuel.

== Composition ==
The Percussion Concerto No. 2 has a duration of roughly 25 minutes and is composed in one continuous movement.

=== Instrumentation ===
The concerto is scored for solo percussion and an orchestra comprising two flutes, two oboes (2nd doubling cor anglais), two clarinets (2nd doubling bass clarinet), bassoon, contrabassoon, four horns, three trumpets, three trombones, tuba, timpani, two percussionists (glockenspiel, two marimbas, tuned gongs, siren, bass drum, suspended sizzle cymbal, tam-tams, tubular bells, tom-tom drums, snare drum, two suspended cymbals, two triangles, thunder sheet), harp, piano, and strings.

The soloist's percussion battery consists of crotales, cencerros, aluphone, vibraphone, marimba, steel drum, four wood blocks, two gliss gongs, eight "assorted pieces of metal", floor tom-toms, high tom-toms, and a pedal bass drum.

== Reception ==
Reviewing the United Kingdom premiere of the Percussion Concert No. 2 with the Philharmonia Orchestra, Tim Ashley of The Guardian lauded the piece and its performer, saying the work "confirms Currie's status as an athlete and a star, as well as an outstanding musician." Richard Fairman of the Financial Times compared the work to MacMillan's Veni, Veni, Emmanuel, saying, "The new concerto does not have the same bullet-like trajectory as that piece, though it shares a similar high-energy orchestral virtuosity." John Allison of The Daily Telegraph wrote:

Revelling in exotic sounds like most percussion concertos, the work contains an element of effect without cause, but MacMillan is too skilful a composer for this to weaken its impact. After an opening cry from the full forces, curiously reminiscent of the visceral Agamemnon motif in Strauss's Elektra and a musical signpost that recurs at key moments throughout this new score, the music takes off with quickly building kinetic energy. The solo part – played with utmost virtuosity by Currie – is chased by orchestral interjections until in the ruminating middle section of this single-movement, 25-minute work the music finds room to breathe. Here a lush string tune is decorated by tuned cowbells before the soloist moves to a steel drum to make chamber music with piano, harp, flutes, double basses and a solo viola's jagged lines.

Reviewing the United States premiere of the piece at the Cabrillo Festival of Contemporary Music, Georgia Rowe of the San Jose Mercury News also praised the work, saying it "gave the orchestra a workout." He added, "Cast in a single movement, it's a high-energy work that employs an even larger orchestra than MacMillan's first percussion concerto, Veni, Veni Emmanuel. The writing is distinctive — bows hitting strings, brass blaring, a growling bassoon. Toward the end of the piece, a gentle hymn emerges from the fray."

== See also ==
- List of compositions by James MacMillan
