= Grand Teton Music Festival =

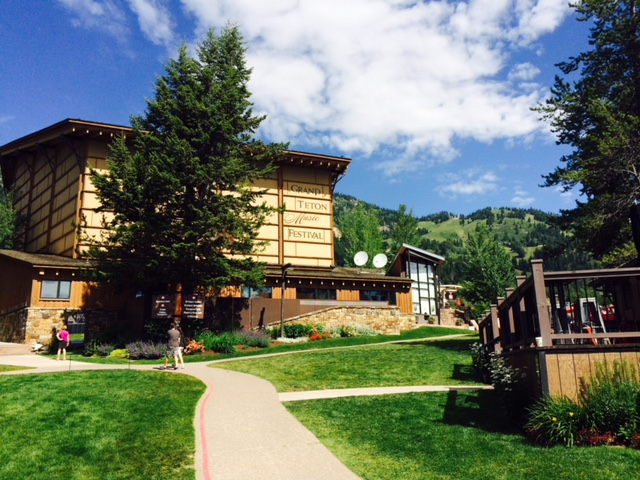
- Walk Festival Hall at Grand Teton Music Festival
- Genre: Classical
- Dates: July - August
- Locations: Jackson Hole, Wyoming, United States
- Years active: 1962 - Present
- Attendance: 22,000
- Website: gtmf.org

The Grand Teton Music Festival is a year-round classical music and opera presenting organization in Jackson Hole, Wyoming. The non-profit organization was founded in 1962.

The primary season is a seven-week summer classical music festival. Over 250 classical musicians from more than 84 different orchestras and 72 institutions of higher learning in North America and Europe participate in the summer festival. The Festival presents family events, gateway series, chamber music, classical crossover artists, and orchestral concerts. In recent years, the Festival has also included year-round experiences with performances The Met: Live in HD opera broadcasts, chamber music, guest artist performances, community concerts and events.

== History ==
The Grand Teton Music Festival was founded in 1962 initially as part of the Jackson Hole Fine Arts Festival. Conductors Ernest Hagen and George Hufsmith led the orchestra as music directors until 1968 when the Fine Arts Festival selected conductor Ling Tung as their successor. Maestro Tung moved the concerts from Jackson Lake Lodge and the Jackson High School gym (referred to as "Symphony Hall") to a large tent at the base of Rendezvous Mountain in Teton Village. The Festival moved into a permanent structure at the base of Rendezvous Mountain in 1974. After Maestro Tung's retirement in 1996, Eiji Oue served as music director from 1997 to 2003. For the 2004 and 2005 seasons, conductor Peter Oundjian served as the principal conductor and artistic advisor to the Festival. In 2006 conductor Donald Runnicles began his tenure as music director, a position he currently holds.

=== Music Directors ===
- 1962–1964: Ernest Hagen
- 1965–1966: George Hufsmith
- 1968–1996: Ling Tung
- 1997–2003: Eiji Oue
- 2006–present: Donald Runnicles

== Programming ==
Grand Teton Music Festival presents 150 events throughout the year, including free family concerts, chamber music, classical crossover concerts, orchestral performances, open rehearsals, pre-concert talks, and community engagement events.

The Festival Orchestra is a resident ensemble, which brings more than 200 musicians from top-tier orchestras across the country. Each summer, the music director leads six of the seven regular Festival Orchestra Concerts, and each concert features a soloist. Additionally, the summer season also features visiting guest artists and chamber music on weekdays.

The Met: Live in HD is a collaboration between the Grand Teton Music Festival and the Jackson non-profit organization, Center of Wonder. High definition broadcasts from the Metropolitan Opera are played at the Center for the Arts in Jackson throughout the fall and spring.

Live from the Grand Teton Music Festival, is a radio broadcast series that airs on Wednesday nights at 8 PM on Wyoming Public Media and Sundays at 8 AM on KHOL 89.1 FM, featuring performances from Walk Festival Hall. Co-hosted by Music Director Sir Donald Runnicles and General Manager Jeff Counts. Available to listen on Thursdays on Apple Podcasts, YouTube, Soundcloud, Amazon Music, and the GTMF website.

== Commissions and premieres ==
The Festival has seen an increase of premieres and commissions in recent years due to the importance the current Music Director Donald Runnicles places on new works.

Regional and world premieres at the Festival include:

| Composer | Work | Year | Occasion |
|---|---|---|---|
| George Hufsmith | Teton Mural | 1962 | World Premiere |
| Lawrence Widdoes | Divertimento | 1965 | World Premiere |
| Ling Tung | GTMF-1977 | 1977 | "close to perfection' Rachmaninoff - Symphony No. 2 in E-Minor, Opus 27 |
| Joseph Castaldo | Landscapes: The Snake River | 1991 | World premiere, Commissioned for Festival's 30th Anniversary season |
| George Hufsmith | Festival Fanfare | 1991 | World premiere, Commissioned for Festival's 30th Anniversary season |
| Jon Deak | Fanfare for Ling | 1996 | World premiere, commissioned in honor of Ling Tung |
| Stephen Paulus | Cello Concerto | 2009 | World premiere, commissioned for Grand Teton Music Festival |
| Jennifer Higdon | All Things Majestic | 2011 | World premiere, commissioned for Grand Teton Music Festival's 50th Anniversary season |
| Aaron Jay Kernis | For Love of the Mountains | 2016 | World, premiere, commissioned in honor of Music Director Donald Runnicles's tenth anniversary |
| Kareem Roustom | Ramal | 2016 | U.S. Premiere |
| Marc Neikrug | The Unicorn of Atlas Peak | 2017 | Western U.S. premiere, co-commissioned with the Atlanta Symphony Orchestra in honor of John Kongsgaard |
| Sean Shepherd | Melt | 2018 | World premiere, co-commissioned with the Cabrillo Festival of Contemporary Music in honor of Sylvia Neil |
| Kareem Roustom | Shades of Night | 2018 | World premiere |
| Jessie Montgomery | Five Freedom Songs | 2021 | Co-Commission |
| Wynton Marsalis | Herald, Holler and Hallelujah! | 2022 | Co-Commission |
| Kareem Roustom | The Clustered Vine | 2023 | World premiere |
| Clarice Assad | Play! | 2024 | Co-Commission |
| Melody Eötvös | Pyramidion | 2024 | Co-Commission |
| Alex Turley | the ocean's dream of itself | 2025 | World premiere |

== Education and community outreach ==
The Festival engages with the community through interactive programs that reach people of all ages through partnerships with various Jackson Hole organizations and the school district. Grand Teton Music Festival conducts various yearlong programs, such as Tune Up, musician residencies, On the Road, Musical Adventures, and scholarships.

One of GTMF's music education program is Tune-Up, which has supplemented the standard music curriculum in local band and orchestra classrooms since 2004. Tune-Up provides teachers who are practicing musicians with expertise and knowledge in a wide variety of instruments, offering both technical skill and real-world musical insight. Tune-Up teaching artists provide private lessons and facilitate rehearsals for Jackson Hole classroom bands and orchestras.

Musicians Residencies is a community engagement program, where world-class Festival artists from the festival work directly with orchestra students around the local community to coach rehearsals, share insights from their professional careers and perform. These artists help inspire the next generation of musicians and foster a lifelong relationship with music.

Grand Teton Music Festival offers On the Road which brings live classical music to audiences in Teton County and surrounding communities through free concerts presented in partnership with community organizations. These programs are accessible to all ages and bring music to life with explanations and demonstrations. The Musical Adventures program offers free, engaging sessions designed for young children and their adult caregivers.

Each year, the GTMF hosts the Annual Scholarship Competition in honor of Music Director Donald Runnicles. The competition is open to graduating high school seniors from Wyoming, Idaho or Montana who are pursuing college music degrees.

== See also ==
- List of classical music festivals
