= Loco (composition) =

2004 composition by Jennifer Higdon

Loco is an orchestral composition in one movement by the American composer Jennifer Higdon. The work was commissioned by the Ravinia Festival of Highland Park, Illinois to commemorate the Ravinia train as part of the Train Commission Project. It was first performed on July 31, 2004, at the Ravinia Festival by the Chicago Symphony Orchestra.

== Composition ==
Loco has a duration of roughly 8 minutes and is composed in a single movement. Higdon described her inspiration for the piece in the score program notes, writing:

"Loco" celebrates the Centennial season of Ravinia, and the train that accompanies the orchestra. When thinking about what kind of piece to write, I saw in my imagination a locomotive. And in a truly ironic move for a composer, my brain subtracted the word "motive", leaving "loco", which means crazy. Being a composer, this appealed to me, so this piece is about locomotion as crazy movement!

=== Instrumentation ===
The work is scored for an orchestra comprising two flutes, piccolo, three oboes, three clarinets, two bassoons, contrabassoon, four French horns, three trumpets, three trombones, tuba, piano, timpani, three percussionists, and strings.

== Reception ==
Jeremy Eichler of The Boston Globe described Loco as "a gleaming and rambunctious curtain-raiser". Scott Cantrell of The Dallas Morning News similarly called it "seven minutes of high-energy scurries, clatters, chatters, jabs, chugs and fanfares." Andrew Druckenbrod of the Pittsburgh Post-Gazette wrote, "This piece imitates a "fast-moving train," and it roared into the hall. The fanfare-like work filled every nook and cranny with rhythmic pulsing and walls of sound." He added:

The work is less technically descriptive than, say, Arthur Honegger's seminal Pacific 231, but it metaphorically captures the thrill of both being on a powerful train and watching one go by, alternating between both views (complete with wonderful Doppler effect brass calls). It was another intriguing piece by the PSO's composer of the year (Higdon).

== See also ==
- List of compositions by Jennifer Higdon
