= Dreamtime Ancestors =

Dreamtime Ancestors is a symphonic poem by the American composer Christopher Theofanidis. The work was commissioned by a consortium of orchestras sponsored by New Music for America. It was composed in the summer of 2015 and was first performed on October 3, 2015, by the Plymouth Philharmonic Orchestra. The piece is dedicated to the late composer Stephen Paulus.

== Composition ==
Dreamtime Ancestors has a duration of roughly 17 minutes and is composed in three movements. The piece is based on an Australian Aboriginal myth, wherein all humans are connected through "dreamtime ancestors."

== Reception ==
Dreamtime Ancestors has been praised by music critics. David Berry of the Spartanburg Herald-Journal wrote:

On first hearing, the three-movement work is evocative and musically rewarding. Its musical features are striking, easy to follow and make the orchestra sound good. Melodic ideas are mostly made up of small cells, or motives, whereas longer melodic lines contribute to a constantly evolving texture. There are echoes of several prominent 20th-century masters but always subsumed by a clear sense of the composer's unique style. From the beginning, the string section is prominently featured with the winds and percussion used mainly to punctuate dramatic moments or reinforce climaxes. The meters and rhythms are mostly familiar twos and fours, but Theofanidis introduces meter changes and even irregular five beats that add nice surprises without disturbing the music's forward impetus. It takes a special talent to create a work with so much surface appeal while being enriched by clever subtleties and intricacies.

Conversely, Charly Spining of the Arizona Daily Sun gave the piece only lukewarm praise, remarking, "In three thematically inter-related sections or movements, Theofanidis' piece presents powerful thematic elements, initially introduced in unison passages for strings and winds, and then developed in an imitative fashion. In the middle section, more diverse rhythmic elements offer some variety before returning to the opening themes as the piece concludes." He added, "While captivating in its concept and colorful instrumentation, the piece is mono-thematic and a bit repetitive, offering little contrast in the tightly integrated sections. It was a bit difficult to perceive the connections in the composer's mind to the 'dreamtime' inspiration for the piece."
