= Midnight Sun Variations =

Orchestral work by Outi Tarkiainen

Midnight Sun Variations is an orchestral composition written in 2019 by the Finnish composer Outi Tarkiainen. The work was written on a joint commission by BBC Radio 3 and the National Arts Centre Orchestra. It was given its world premiere by the BBC Philharmonic conducted by John Storgårds (to whom the piece is dedicated) as part of the BBC Proms at the Royal Albert Hall, London, on 4 August 2019.

== Composition ==
Midnight Sun Variations is cast in one continuous movement and lasts about 11 minutes. The title of the work refers to the eponymous natural phenomenon that occurs in the summer months north of the Arctic Circle, near where Tarkiainen grew up in the Lapland region of Finland. In the score program note, the composer added, "My first child was born on just such a night, as the summer's last warm day gave way to a dawn shrouded in autumnal mist, in a flash wiping away a whole season. Midnight Sun Variations is also about the opening of a woman's body to accommodate a new life, about giving birth, when the woman and the child within her part company, restoring her former self as the light fades into autumn."

=== Instrumentation ===
The work is scored for a large orchestra comprising three flutes (3rd doubling piccolo), three oboes (3rd doubling Cor anglais), three clarinets (3rd doubling bass clarinet), three bassoons (3rd doubling contrabassoon), four horns, three trumpets, two trombones, bass trombone, tuba, timpani, three percussionists, harp, piano (doubling celesta), and strings.

== Reception ==
Midnight Sun Variations has been generally praised by music critics. Reviewing the world premiere, Neil Fisher of The Times wrote, "The classical canon isn't replete with works about childbirth, probably for obvious reasons. [...] So a welcome dawn shone on Outi Tarkiainen's Midnight Sun Variations, inspired by the birth of the composer's son." He added, "It's very beautiful, chains of shimmering percussion setting off a kind of twinkling relay contest, before bigger, thicker lines are drawn by the strings, pulsing almost like a Steve Reich soundscape. The expressive energy of the piece hides its intricate effects: Tarkiainen doesn’t get bogged down by details and her voice comes through strongly." Robert Beale of The Arts Desk also praised the piece, saying that it "builds to a massive climax of sound, with echoes (it seems to me) of the textures, harmonies and energy of some of Sibelius's depictions." Pierre Ruhe of ArtsATL similarly described it as "gorgeous and suggestive of muted, shifting colors that are at once eerie, tender and affectionate. Nothing tangible actually happens, so it feels like a scene that's just outside the listener's perspective. Perhaps we're witnessing someone's reactions to a transcendent experience."
