= Blue cathedral =

Orchestral work by Jennifer Higdon

blue cathedral is an orchestral composition by the American composer Jennifer Higdon. The work was commissioned by the Curtis Institute of Music in 1999 to commemorate the conservatory's 75th anniversary. It was first performed in 2000 by the Curtis Institute of Music Symphony Orchestra. The piece is dedicated to the memory of Higdon's brother and is one of the composer's most performed works.

== Composition ==
blue cathedral has a duration of roughly 13 minutes and is composed in a single movement.

=== Background ===
The piece was written in memory of Higdon's younger brother, Andrew Blue Higdon, who died of skin cancer in June 1998. The composer wrote in the score program note:

I began writing this piece at a unique juncture in my life and found myself pondering the question of what makes a life. The recent loss of my younger brother, Andrew Blue, made me reflect on the amazing journeys that we all make in our lives, crossing paths with so many individuals singularly and collectively, learning and growing each step of the way. This piece represents the expression of the individual and the group... our inner travels and the places our souls carry us, the lessons we learn, and the growth we experience. In tribute to my brother, I feature solos for the clarinet (the instrument he played) and the flute (the instrument I play). Because I am the older sibling, it is the flute that appears first in this dialog. At the end of the work, the two instruments continue their dialogue, but it is the flute that drops out and the clarinet that continues on in the upward progressing journey.

Higdon later described the process of composing blue cathedral as "the most cathartic thing [she] could have done."

=== Instrumentation ===
The work is scored for an orchestra comprising two flutes (2nd doubling piccolo), oboe, cor anglais, two clarinets, two bassoons, four horns, three trumpets, three trombones, tuba, harp, piano, celesta, timpani, three percussionists, and strings.

== Reception ==
blue cathedral has received a positive response from critics. Tim Smith of The Baltimore Sun lauded, "The music seems to emit and reflect light as it moves from stillness to exuberance and back again, tapering off ethereally. If you didn't know the personal story behind it, the music could still touch your heart; when you do know that story, it can touch your soul." David Patrick Stearns of The Philadelphia Inquirer also praised the piece, writing:

Listeners don't need to know that blue cathedral was written as a memorial for Higdon's deceased brother: You're so enveloped by the grief, hope and intuitive musical invention welling up through the rich orchestration that you might not remember many specific details about the music from one hearing to the next. I've heard it a lot, and though it's hardly dense or difficult, every encounter feels like a new one.

Travis Rivers of The Spokesman-Review similarly remarked:

blue cathedral produced an otherworldly atmosphere of floating sound, yet the work never seemed directionless. The work opened with very soft bell-like sounds and quiet solos beautifully played by flutist Bruce Bodden and clarinetist Chip Phillips. As the work gained intensity many of the orchestra principal players also joined with impressive solos. At the height of wave of sound, the celestial quiet of the beginning returned, accompanied with muted strings and the sound of softly ringing Chinese Reflex Bells and the eerie sound of tuned water-filled glasses being rubbed along their rims. The work was wonderfully effective besides being friendly to the ear.

== Recording ==
A recording of blue cathedral, performed by Robert Spano and the Atlanta Symphony Orchestra, was released in 2003 through Telarc. The disk also featured Christopher Theofanidis's Rainbow Body, Samuel Barber's Symphony in One Movement, and Aaron Copland's Appalachian Spring.

== See also ==
- List of compositions by Jennifer Higdon
