= Wood, Metal and Skin =

Wood, Metal and Skin is a percussion concerto written in 2004 by the Scottish composer Thea Musgrave. It was commissioned by the National Youth Orchestras of Scotland, which performed the world premiere with the percussionist Colin Currie conducted by Garry Walker in Usher Hall, Edinburgh, on 4 January 2005. The score is dedicated to Colin Currie.

== Composition ==
Wood, Metal and Skin has a duration of roughly 17 minutes and is cast in a prologue, three movements, two interludes, and an epilogue. The movements are named for the type of percussion instruments they feature.

1. Prologue: dramatic
2. Wood: lyrical
  Interlude A: mysterious
3. Metal: capricious
  Interlude B: excitedly
4. Skin: stormy
  Epilogue: peaceful

=== Instrumentation ===
The work is scored for a solo percussionist and orchestra. The percussionist's battery comprises marimba, metal wind chimes (mark tree), Chinese Bell tree, vibraphone, tubular bells, four conga drums, four tom toms, and four bongo drums. The orchestra consists of two flutes, two oboes, two clarinets, two bassoons, four horns, three trumpets, trombone, tuba, four additional percussionists, and strings.

== Reception ==
Lynne Walker of The Independent praised the concerto, writing, "Far from offering another opportunity to bash anything that is created out of wood, metal or skin, Musgrave has clearly taken into account both Currie's virtuosity and sensitive musical expressiveness." She added, "As you might expect from Musgrave, abundant contrast in rhythm, colour and texture is fastidiously and fascinatingly woven into the musical fabric."
