= Dialogues II =

Composition by Elliott Carter

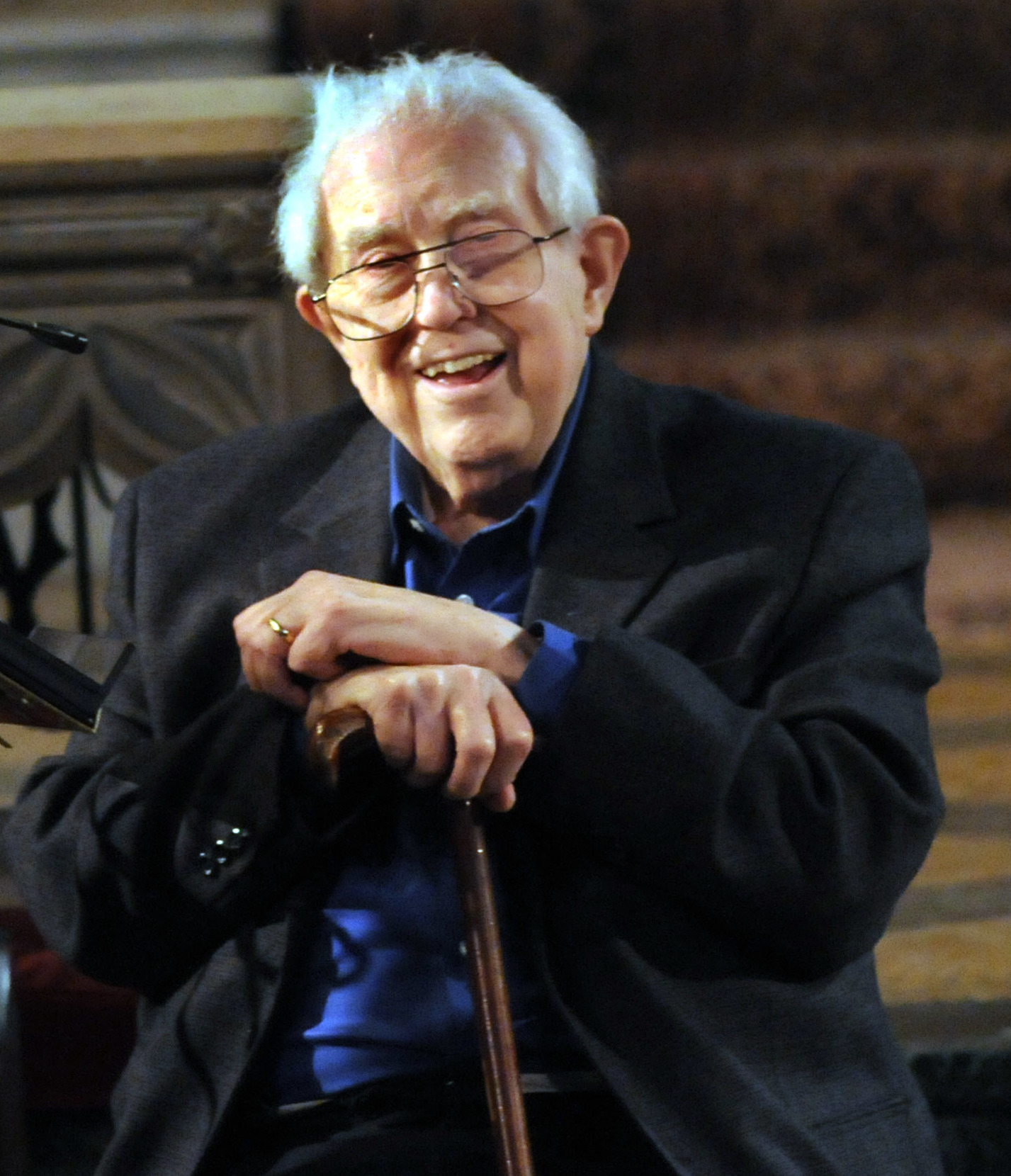
Elliott Carter in 2007

Dialogues II is a composition for piano and chamber orchestra by the American composer Elliott Carter. It was composed in celebration of the conductor Daniel Barenboim's 70th birthday. The work was first performed at La Scala, Milan on October 25, 2012, by Barenboim on the piano and the Orchestra of La Scala under the conductor Gustavo Dudamel. Composed at the age of 103, Dialogues II was one of Carter's last completed orchestral compositions before his death in November 2012. The piece is a follow-up to the composer's 2003 Dialogues, which was a finalist for the 2005 Pulitzer Prize for Music.

== Music ==
Dialogues II is composed in a single movement and has a duration of roughly 5 minutes. In dedicating the piece to Daniel Barenboim, Carter wrote in the score program notes, "The dynamo of enthusiasm that propels his extraordinary musical skills; performing, conducting and imagining new ideas and his views on many varied conceptions make Daniel [Barenboim] a model and an exciting stimulus for us all." He concluded, "I hope a little of that reveals itself in this 70th birthday present."

The work is scored for solo piano and a chamber orchestra comprising flute, oboe, clarinet, bassoon, two horns, trumpet, trombone, and strings.

== Reception ==
Reviewing a performance of the work at Barenboim's 70th birthday concert, Rosie Pentreath of the BBC Music Magazine declared Dialogues II "the only work, one can confidently say, written by a 103-year old." She added, "it is brief, gnomic, and confidently played." The composition was also lauded by Keith Bruce of The Herald.
