= Machine (Higdon) =

Machine is a single-movement orchestral encore piece by the American composer Jennifer Higdon. The work was commissioned in 2003 by the National Symphony Orchestra through a grant from the John and June Hechinger Commissioning Fund for New Orchestra Works. It was first performed by the National Symphony Orchestra under the conductor Giancarlo Guerrero on March 6, 2003.

== Composition ==
Machine has a duration of roughly 2 minutes and is composed in one short movement. Higdon described her inspiration for the piece in the score program notes, writing, "I wrote Machine as an encore tribute to composers like Mozart and Tchaikovsky, who seemed to be able to write so many notes and so much music that it seems like they were machines!"

=== Instrumentation ===
The work is scored for an orchestra comprising piccolo, flute, two oboes, two clarinets, two bassoons, four horns, two trumpets, three trombones, tuba, timpani, and strings.

== Reception ==
Reviewing the world premiere, Ronald Broun of The Washington Post wrote, "It is one long, loud, freight-train crescendo with hellishly snapping winds and jumping-bean rhythms, and it sweeps relentlessly forward for just under three minutes, then stops on a dime. For sheer unpretentious fun it was just the ticket."

== See also ==
- List of compositions by Jennifer Higdon
