= Light Refracted =

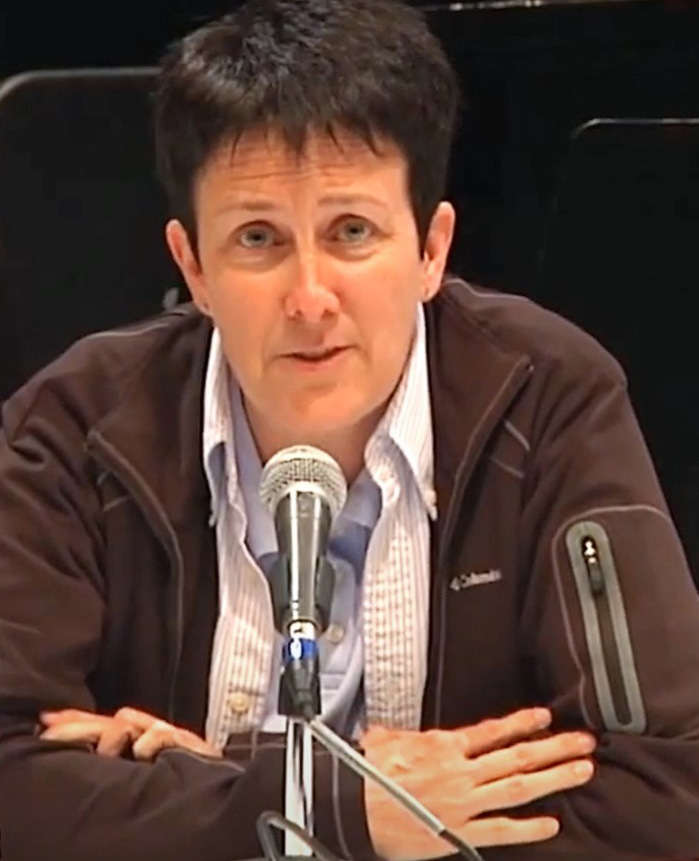
Jennifer Higdon in 2014

Light Refracted is a two-movement composition for chamber ensemble by the American composer Jennifer Higdon. It was first performed on September 22, 2002 at the Kimmel Center for the Performing Arts by the clarinetist Igor Begelman, violinist Jo-Young Baek, violist Christina Castelli, cellist Mark Kosower, and pianist Tatiana Goncharova.

== Composition ==
Light Refracted has duration of roughly 20 minutes and is composed in two movements:

1. Inward
2. Outward

Higdon described the inspiration of the piece in the score program notes, writing:

Light Refracted is a meditation on the way that light is reflected in people: there is the inward view of that light, which is thoughtful and contemplating, with a wide range of emotion; and outward... the light that we shine out towards the world (in this case, full of energy). The possible number of ways that light can refract (meaning to splinter and reflect in different dimensions and angles) are endless.

The work is scored for a small ensemble comprising a clarinet, violin, viola, cello, and piano.

== Reception ==
Reviewing the world premiere, Daniel Webster of The Philadelphia Inquirer praised the piece, writing:

The Philadelphia composer's introspective view is transparent with melodic lines that gradually evolve. The style and mood inevitably evoke French atmospheres, but with a determined and concise way of completing core musical ideas. The music flows while seeming motionless, and the interplay of clarinet with the other instruments broadened the color range of each. The second part, "Outward," reached for explosive moments. Higdon turned the music inside out with brusque attacks in the strings, insistent piano patterns, and fierce energy. Here, the clarinet recalled Eastern Europe, yet the composer found gestures in each instrument to identify the work instantly as American.

Reviewing a later recording the work, Dan Visconti of NewMusicBox also praised the music, remarking, "The work follows out of Higdon’s popular orchestral work Blue Cathedral. Inspired by Monet's studies of the same subject viewed in different light, Higdon takes another look at her own musical materials and the result is a compelling two-movement work that becomes even more interesting for listeners who are already familiar with Blue Cathedral and will be able to appreciate the many ways that Higdon recasts that material." Richard Whitehouse of Gramophone compared the piece to Higdon's other chamber music, remarking, "Light Refracted (2002) adopts a different strategy in which the image of the title is conveyed by two distinct movements: the 'Inward' process characterised by ruminative and eloquently sustained music, the 'Outward' process represented by compact and vigorous music that does not so much balance as cancel out its predecessor."

== See also ==
- List of compositions by Jennifer Higdon
