= All Things Majestic =

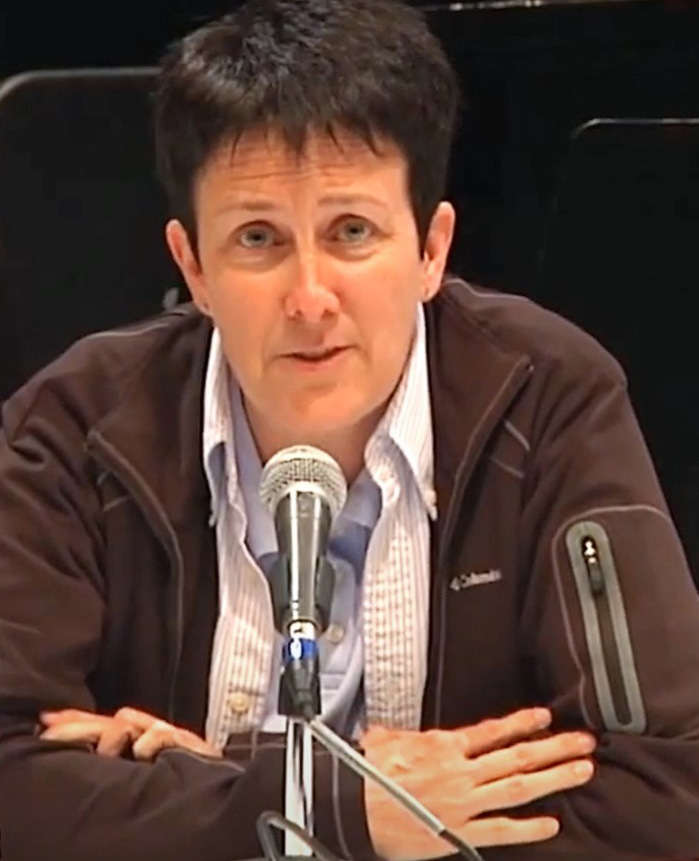
Jennifer Higdon in 2014

All Things Majestic is an orchestral suite written by the American composer Jennifer Higdon. The work was commissioned by the Grand Teton Music Festival to commemorate the organization's 50th anniversary. It was first performed at Walk Festival Hall on August 19, 2011.

In the score program notes, Higdon, who described the National Parks as "one of America's greatest treasures," recalled that she "jumped" at the chance to compose a work commemorating the Grand Teton Music Festival. She described All Things Majestic as "a tribute to not only the festival and it's [sic] home, the Tetons, but also to the grandeur and majesty of all of our parks."

== Music ==
All Things Majestic has a duration of approximately 22 minutes and is cast in four movements:

1. Teton Range
2. String Lake
3. Snake River
4. Cathedrals

The work is scored for an orchestra consisting of two flutes, two oboes, two clarinets, two bassoons, four horns, three trumpets, three trombones, tuba, harp, celesta, timpani, three percussionists, and strings.

== Reception ==
The music critic Donald Rosenberg of Gramophone praised All Things Majestic, "whose four movements paint portraits of thrilling landscapes." He added, "Higdon uses the full resources of the orchestra to convey the splendour of mountains, motion of bodies of water and wonders of other natural phenomena." Carlos María Solare of The Strad similarly wrote, "The kaleidoscopic variety of All Things Majestic, a four-movement suite inspired by the breathtaking landscapes of the Teton mountain range, showcases the orchestra's collective virtuosity."
