= Milky Ways =

Orchestral work by Outi Tarkiainen

Milky Ways is concerto for cor anglais and orchestra written in 2022 by the Finnish composer Outi Tarkiainen. The work was written on a joint commission from the Finnish Radio Symphony Orchestra, the San Francisco Symphony, and BBC Radio 3. Its world premiere was performed by the oboist Nicholas Daniel and the Finnish Radio Symphony Orchestra conducted by Nicholas Collon at the Helsinki Music Centre, Helsinki, on 15 March 2023. The score is inscribed "for Nicholas Daniel in loving memory of his Mother Billie."

== Composition ==
Milky Ways lasts about 21 minutes and is cast in three movements:

1. The Infant Gaze
2. Interplays
3. At the Fountainhead of God

The title of the work refers both to the eponymous galaxy containing the Solar System, but also the act of nursing a baby, from which the piece draws its theme. The title of the first movement "The Infant Gaze" refers to a new-born child looking at the mother, while the finale "At the Fountainhead of God" refers to the milk flowing from mother to child.

During the composition process, Tarkiainen learned of the early death of Nicholas Daniel's mother Billie when the oboist was a young man. In the score program note, she wrote, "The concerto accordingly ends with a moving farewell scene polarising the two counterparts birth and death, the two sacred moments in life." To this effect, the composer included a moment of blocking during which the solo performer rises, walks behind the orchestra, and exits through the stage door, all the while being followed by a spotlight.

=== Instrumentation ===
The work is scored for solo cor anglais and an orchestra comprising two oboes, three clarinets (3rd doubling bass clarinet), two bassoons (2nd doubling contrabassoon), four horns, two trumpets, two trombones, tuba, timpani, three percussionists, harp, piano (doubling celesta), and strings. The score also requires the use of a spotlight in the concert hall.

== Reception ==
Reviewing the United States premiere, Joshua Kosman of the San Francisco Chronicle gave the piece a positive review, writing, "Two movements devoted to the bond between mother and infant are filled with starry plinking and gently swirling orchestral textures, like something from a planetarium show. Much of this is sinuous and inviting but vague of purpose; if there is a formal outline at work, it isn't easy to detect." He continued, "But the concerto snaps beautifully into focus once the third movement, titled 'At the Fountainhead of God,' arrives. Tarkiainen sets the journey in motion with a series of other-worldly figurative strands from the harp and celesta, with the strings murmuring barely audible harmonies in the background like some sort of cosmic wind." Rebecca Wishnia of the San Francisco Classical Voice was somewhat more critical of the work, however, describing it as "mostly a wash — like those first few weeks of motherhood, I suppose." She added, "Still, there are a few Kodak moments: the transparent flutters at the end of the first movement, the celesta's tender windup lullaby in the third. In one inventive episode, de Luna calls the shots in an intricate call-and-response, his own part tiny and insignificant and still the center of the universe."
