= Rainbow Body =

Orchestral composition by Christopher Theofanidis

Rainbow Body is an orchestral composition by the American composer Christopher Theofanidis. It was commissioned by the Houston Symphony, which first performed the work in April 2000 under the conductor Robert Spano. The piece is dedicated to the Texas lawyer and philanthropist Glen Rosenbaum. Rainbow Body is one of Theofanidis's most-performed compositions and won the 2003 London Masterprize International Composing Competition.

== Composition ==
Rainbow Body has a duration of roughly 13 minutes and is composed in a single movement. The melody of the piece is loosely based on "Ave Maria, o auctrix vite" by the 12th-century composer Hildegard of Bingen. The composition was also inspired by the Tibetan Buddhist idea of rainbow body (from which the piece takes its title), wherein the body of an enlightened being is absorbed back into the universe upon his/her death.

== Reception ==
Rainbow Body has been praised by music critics. Andrew Druckenbrod of the Pittsburgh Post-Gazette opined, "Under its attractive shimmering surface, it has depth and sophistication." Andrew Farach-Colton of Gramophone also lauded the piece, writing:

Christopher Theofanidis's Rainbow Body has exuberant outbursts of pure diatonic splendour that are not so far removed from Copland's 'prairie' harmonies, though Theofanidis's piece is actually based on a chant by the medieval mystic Hildegard von Bingen. Indeed, Hildegard's melody is woven so seamlessly into the score's colourful fabric that one would likely never guess its provenance – especially given the music's distinctly American accent.

Bernard Holland of The New York Times gave the piece a mixed response, however, noting that it "sounded suspiciously like bait: a user-friendly feel-good piece bearing the imprimatur of modernity and beckoning to listeners skittish of the new. [...] That his music speaks a language that flourished and died nearly a century ago should not be a stigma. We are getting past the stage where originality of method in music is more important than content." He added:

And there are interesting elements here. Quasi-modal melody plays in unison across all of the upper strings and against trembling drones in the lower ones. The acoustical echo created solely by means of instruments is fascinating. Interspersed with this lyrical, exotic soul-searching are outbursts of distress that seem halfhearted at best. Mr. Theofanidis's brass-ridden, major-chord coda comes, I am sure, from the composer's heart. But it bloviates to an embarrassing degree.

== Recording ==
A recording of Rainbow Body, performed by Robert Spano and the Atlanta Symphony Orchestra, was released in 2003 through Telarc. The disk also featured Samuel Barber's Symphony in One Movement, Aaron Copland's Appalachian Spring, and Jennifer Higdon's blue cathedral.
