= Outi Tarkiainen =

Finnish composer

Outi Tarkiainen (b. February 7, 1985) is a Finnish composer of contemporary classical music. Tarkiainen grew up in Rovaniemi, the capital and commercial center of the Finnish Lapland region. She studied composition with Eero Hämeenniemi and Veli-Matti Puumala at the Sibelius Academy in Helsinki, with Ron Miller at the University of Miami, and with Malcolm Singer at the Guildhall School of Music and Drama in London.

== List of works ==
=== Opera ===
- A Room of One's Own (2021)
- Upcoming project with librettist Aleksi Barrière

=== Orchestra ===
- Midnight Sun Variations (2019)
- Songs of the Ice (2019)
- The Ring of Fire and Love (2020)
- Mosaics (2021)
- Polar Pearls (2023)

=== Concertante ===
- Saivo (2016) for soprano saxophone and orchestra
- Milky Ways (2022) for Cor anglais and orchestra

=== Song cycles ===
- The Earth, Spring's Daughter (2015) - for mezzo-soprano and chamber orchestra
- The Lustful Mother (2018) for baritone, piano, and string orchestra

=== Wind ensemble ===
- Joye (2017)

=== Chamber music ===
- Beaivi (2016)
- Siimes (2017)
- There is more light in this room when you are here (2018)
- They Walked Side by Side (2018)
- The Lustful Mother's Heart (2020)
- Without a Trace (2020)
- Woodland Fanfares (2021)
- Tenderness (2022)
- The Seasons of Love (2023)
