= City Scape =

Orchestral piece by Jennifer Higdon

City Scape is an orchestral piece composed by Jennifer Higdon in 2002 and commissioned by the Atlanta Symphony Orchestra. It premiered November 14, 2002, under the direction and dedicated to Robert Spano. City Scape calls for a concerto grosso, in which 35 instruments are used; yet many of these instruments have featured solos that are scattered throughout the piece. The piece lasts a total of 31 minutes.

City Scape is a piece in three movements that paints an image of where Higdon grew up in Atlanta, Georgia: "Skyline", "River Sings a Song to Trees", and "Peachtree Street". The movements can be played either separately or together at the discretion of the conductor. Higdon wanted to invoke certain images and aspects of Atlanta. When asked by a musician if she was trying to express a sidewalk in her music, she commented that there was not a precise image in her piece. Instead, there were "bustle of traffic and intensity of moving down the street". Thus she wanted to give an overall image as opposed to Strauss who wanted to depict a single detailed object.

In the first movement entitled "Skyline", Higdon wanted to express the city's profile through the steel buildings and monuments that represent Atlanta's signature skyline. The steel buildings represent a sense of boldness, strength, and growth along with people who live and work there. Therefore, within the first few measures of the piece, the boldness is most noticeable during the synchronized brass introduction along with percussions that accent this moment. However, near the middle of the movement, the piece has a lighter texture as noted with the wind players. This lighter texture represents the swirling of people who are moving in and out of the building. This movement is reminiscent of the styles from Aaron Copland, William Schuman and Samuel Barber in terms of urban soundscape. Her inspiration for this piece as she recalls were "coming out intact and so fast, [she] put it down in short score and orchestrated it later".

The second movement, "River Sings a Song to Trees", is the most tranquil compared of the three movements. This movement was in reference to the more nature-like part of the city such as the creeks and parks, which is in huge contrast to the skyscrapers in the last movement. More specifically the piece was inspired by the creek that ran through Higdon's yard on Ferncliff Road in Buckhead. She describes Atlanta as this "giant green carpet with buildings poking out" as seen from an airplane.

Finally the last movement, "Peachtree Street", despite the serene title, is a representation of the roadways into and out of the cities. Since each street is bustling with energy and people, she wanted to reflect people moving about quickly with their business. Therefore, the theme from the first movement returns in this movement; yet at the same time, the presence of new parts illustrates the diversity as well in these original city streets. This large finale brings the piece to a close as she ties the orchestral tones into one larger voice at the end.

Her piece received positive criticism from local and national newspaper alike: "'SkyLine' is a lively, inventive concert opener by Jennifer Higdon... she really knows how to write idiomatically for a large orchestra-to make the instruments really sound. 'SkyLine' has a strong rhythmic propulsion, witty orchestral effects, and a refreshing sense of vigor and optimism. Spano gave a dynamic, beautifully detailed reading to this masterful vignette" as stated by The Coral Gables Gazette. The Atlanta Journal-Constitution characterized the piece as "jaunty, propulsive optimism" and that the movement "ends with cresting excitement".

== See also ==
- List of compositions by Jennifer Higdon
