= The Coral Gables Gazette =

Online newspaper based in Coral Gables, Florida

Coral Gables Gazette
- Type: Digital newspaper
- Owner(s): Limestone Communications, Inc.
- Publisher: Justin Prisendorf
- General manager: Alexis Prisendorf
- Language: English
- Headquarters: 200 Sevilla Avenue Suite#206, Coral Gables, Florida United States
- Circulation: ~3,300
- Website: gables-gazette.com

Coral Gables Gazette is an online newspaper based in Coral Gables, Florida covering Coral Gables, South Miami, Coconut Grove, Pinecrest and Brickell. The newspaper was owned by Limestone Communications, Inc. The paper was in publication from 1996 to 2012. In February 2025, it resumed publication as a digital-only publication.
