= Concerto for Orchestra (Higdon) =

2002 composition by Jennifer Higdon

The Concerto for Orchestra is an orchestral composition in five movements by the American composer Jennifer Higdon. The work was commissioned by the Philadelphia Orchestra with contributions from the National Endowment for the Arts, the Philadelphia Music Project, and Peter Benoliel. It was premiered at the Kimmel Center for the Performing Arts in Philadelphia June 12, 2002, with conductor Wolfgang Sawallisch leading the Philadelphia Orchestra.

== Composition ==
The Concerto for Orchestra has a duration of roughly 35 minutes and is composed in five numbered movements.

=== Instrumentation ===
The piece is scored for three flutes (3rd doubling piccolo), three oboes, two clarinets, bass clarinet, two bassoons, contrabassoon, four French horns, three trumpets, three trombones, tuba, harp, piano, celesta, timpani, three percussionists, and strings.

== Reception ==
Andrew Farach-Colton of Gramophone praised the Concerto for Orchestra, saying, "One expects a concerto to be virtuosic, and Higdon peppers this one with solos for the first-desk players, while also offering plenty of opportunity for more general orchestral muscle flexing." Reviewing a performance by the Mannes College The New School for Music Orchestra, Allan Kozinn of The New York Times lauded the piece as "accessible but technically demanding" and wrote, "Like the concertos for orchestra by Bartok and Lutoslawski, this is a showpiece that makes demands on every section and often calls for unusual timbres: the quickly descending violin glissandos, which create an almost electronic effect in the third movement, for example, or the eerie bowed percussion sounds that open the fourth." Kozinn further remarked:

Combinations of strings and bells yield a magical, sparkling effect, and some of the woodwind passages approach that spirit from a different direction, with allusions to the brisk descending clarinet lines that animate Bernstein’s "Candide" Overture along the way. But the work is not just a catalog of fancy effects. Ms. Higdon also provides long stretches of fast-bowed, percussion-supported, muscular orchestral writing, particularly in the opening movement and the finale, when both the score and this young orchestra were at their fiery best.

Conversely, Andrew Clements of The Guardian called the piece "supremely forgettable" and "an example of American contemporary music at its most vacuous, a noisy mishmash of early 20th-century styles".

== Recordings ==
The first recording of this work was released by Telarc on March 23, 2004, with a recording of Higdon's work City Scape (2002). It was performed by the Atlanta Symphony Orchestra under the baton of Robert Spano.

== See also ==
- List of compositions by Jennifer Higdon
