= Frozen in Time (Dorman) =

Concerto by Avner Dorman

Frozen in Time is a three movement concerto for solo percussion and orchestra by Israeli-American composer Avner Dorman. The work was commissioned by the Socrates Stiftung Karin Rehn-Kaufmann with support from the Hamburg Philharmonic and the Israeli Consulate in Berlin. The piece was completed in 2007 and received its world premiere in December 2007 by Martin Grubinger and the Philharmonisches Staatsorchester Hamburg conducted by Simone Young.

The work has since become a standard piece in the contemporary percussion concerto repertoire.

== Reception ==
The music critic Anne Midgette of the Washington Post lauded the piece as "wide-ranging, appealing, breathtakingly virtuosic, sophisticated enough to appeal to an audience of classical aficionados, and approachable enough to appeal to people who have never been to an orchestra concert." John von Rhein also praised the piece in the Chicago Tribune calling it a "terrific contemporary score." Rhein continued:

A 25-minute percussion concerto written for Wednesday's soloist, the young Austrian percussion whizbang, Martin Grubinger (who premiered it in Hamburg in 2007), its three movements purport to be "imaginary snapshots" of the primordial land masses that supposedly broke off from the continent of Pangaea – "Indoafrica," "Eurasia" and "The Americas" are the movement titles. The listener requires no such programmatic crutch to appreciate what this colorful, high-energy showpiece is about: two furious fast movements surrounding a slow, lyrical movement, moshing together grunge rock, Afro-Cuban jazz, ethnic, swing, blues and other popular musical impulses in a way that appears perfectly natural rather than simple-minded pastiche.

In 2014, Simone Rubino won the ARD International Music Competition performing the piece and Christoph Sietzen came in third with the same piece.

== Recordings ==
In 2018 a commercial recording of 'Frozen in Time' was released by Sony Music Entertainment Germany, GmbH. It features Christoph Siezten with the Romanian National Symphony Orchestra conducted by Cristian Mandeal.
