= Three Illusions for Orchestra =

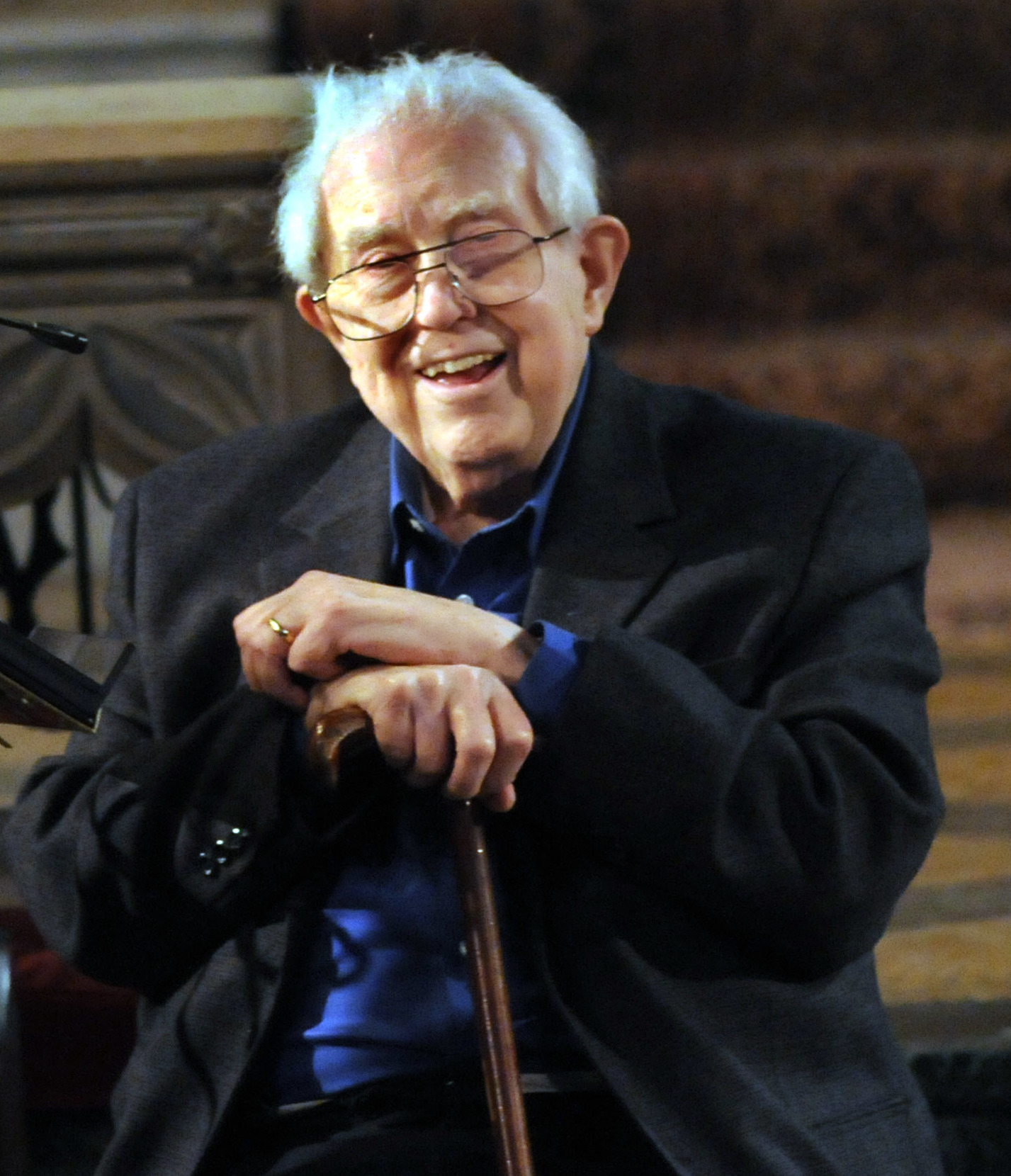
Elliott Carter in 2007

Three Illusions for Orchestra is an orchestral triptych by the American composer Elliott Carter. The complete work was given its world premiere in Symphony Hall, Boston, on October 6, 2005, by the Boston Symphony Orchestra under the conductor James Levine.

== Structure ==
Three Illusions for Orchestra has a duration of roughly 9 minutes and is composed in three movements:

1. Micomicón
2. Fons Juventatis
3. More's Utopia

=== I. Micomicón ===
"Micomicón" was originally commissioned by the Boston Symphony Orchestra for the conductor James Levine and was composed in New York City in 2002. The title comes from the novel Don Quixote by Miguel de Cervantes, about which Carter described in the program notes, "Micomicón, invented by Sancho Panza and his friends to cure Don Quixote's 'madness', is said to be a kingdom near Ethiopia stolen by a giant from its queen, Micomicona, who beseeches the adventurous Don Q. to put her back on the throne (in Cervantes' great novel, chapters 29-30, book 1)."

=== II. Fons Juventatis ===
"Fons Juventatis" refers to a Roman myth wherein Jupiter fell for the goddess Juventas and later turned her into a fountain, whose waters rejuvenate all who bathe in it.

=== III. More's Utopia ===
"More's Utopia" refers to the 1516 book Utopia by Thomas More. Carter wrote in the score program notes, "Thomas More invented the word Utopia (Ou Topos – no place), the name for his imagined completely happy society with no central government, which followed draconian laws that governed almost all human activities."

== Instrumentation ==
The work is scored for a large orchestra comprising three flutes (2nd and 3rd doubling piccolo), two oboes, cor anglais, two clarinets (2nd doubling bass clarinet), bass clarinet, contrabass clarinet, three bassoons (3rd doubling contrabassoon), four horns, three trumpets, three trombones, tuba, timpani, three percussionists, piano, harp, and strings.

== Reception ==
Three Illusions for Orchestra has been praised by music critics. George Grella of the New York Classical Review called it "a distillation of the brilliant, aphoristic style of Carter’s work from his ninth decade on." He added, "Carter scores for a large orchestra yet writes with such spare precision that it almost sounds like chamber music. The polyphony is particularly unadorned, and the subject matter, the dangers of utopian thinking, was important to the composer in his last years." Anne Midgette of The New York Times similarly remarked:

Taken together the three pieces, based on literary works, make an appealing orchestral showpiece, with little of the thorniness that is supposed to be a hallmark of Mr. Carter's larger-scale music. "Micomicón" is tipped with shimmering cymbals; "Fons Juventatis" ("Fountain of Youth") offered bubbling winds and deep crosscurrents of low strings in a sunny mélange; and "Utopia," based on Thomas More's austere vision, is a dark place of ominous sounds both sharp and loud, ending with a lash of percussion.

Andrew Clements of The Guardian called the three movements "glitteringly polished miniatures" and wrote:

Each of three pieces has a literary inspiration, and each is the evocation of an imaginary world. The first and most discursive, Micomicón, derives from an episode in Don Quixote; the second, Fons Juventutis, refers to the myth of the spring of eternal youth - a touching choice for a composer in his late 90s - and is a wispy scherzo utterly characteristic of late Carter; the final piece, More's Utopia, is a halting, rather menacing slow movement, quizzical rather than assured.
