= Veni, Veni, Emmanuel (MacMillan) =

Concerto for percussion and orchestra

Veni, Veni, Emmanuel is a concerto for percussion and orchestra by James MacMillan. MacMillan began composing it on the first Sunday of Advent 1991 and completed it on Easter Sunday 1992, dates that are significant to the work itself. The work was commissioned by Christian Salvesen PLC. It received its premiere on 10 August 1992 at the Royal Albert Hall, London, performed by Evelyn Glennie and the Scottish Chamber Orchestra under Jukka-Pekka Saraste. The work is in one movement, and lasts around 25 minutes. The music draws on the Advent plainchant of the same name, which appears in its full form only at the end.

== Structure ==
There are five main sections to the work: after the introduction is a 'heartbeat' section (representing, according to the composer, "the human presence of Christ"), followed by a 'hocket' dance; transition sequences lead in and out of the central Gaude, after which the dance reappears. The piece reaches its climax with the unfolding of the plainchant in chorale form, after which the work is closed by a coda in which the heartbeat motif and the percussionist on tubular bells have the last word.

The piece makes important use of a soloist who plays various percussion including tam-tams, two snare drums, congas, timbales, gongs, woodblocks and marimba. According to MacMillan this makes the soloist "an equal partner with the orchestra."

Veni, Veni, Emmanuel is the most frequently performed concerto composed in the 1990s. City of Birmingham Symphony Orchestra and percussionist Colin Currie conducted by Marin Alsop gave the 300th performance on 25 March 2003 at Symphony Hall in Birmingham.

== Recordings ==
- Catalyst 09026-61916-2 Tracks 1–8. Evelyn Glennie, Scottish Chamber Orchestra.

=== Tracking and timing ===
1. Introit - Advent (2:40)
2. **Heartbeats** (2:36)
3. **Dance - Hocket** (4:17)
4. Transition: Sequence I (2:34)
5. **Gaude, Gaude** (5:35) (mislabeled as track 6 in some booklet printings)
6. Transition: Sequence II (2:39) (mislabeled as track 7 in some booklet printings)
7. **Dance - Chorale** (2:53) (not listed in some booklet printings)
8. **Coda - Easter** (3:03)

Major sections are bolded

Tracks 9-19 are other MacMillan compositions.

== See also ==
- List of compositions by James MacMillan
