= Christopher Theofanidis =

American composer

Christopher Theofanidis (born December 18, 1967, in Dallas, Texas) is an American composer whose works have been performed by leading orchestras from around the world, including the London Symphony Orchestra, the Philadelphia Orchestra, the Moscow Soloists, the National, Atlanta, Baltimore, St. Louis, Detroit, and many others. He participated in the Young American Composer-in-Residence Program with Barry Jekowsky and the California Symphony from 1994 to 1996 and, more recently, served as Composer of the Year for the Pittsburgh Symphony during their 2006–2007 Season, for which he wrote a violin concerto for Sarah Chang.

== Career ==
Theofanidis holds degrees from Yale University, the Eastman School of Music, and the University of Houston, and has been the recipient of the International Masterprize (hosted at the Barbican Centre in London), the Rome Prize, a Guggenheim Fellowship, six ASCAP Gould Prizes, a Fulbright Fellowship to France, a Tanglewood Fellowship, and the American Academy of Arts and Letters' Charles Ives Fellowship. In 2007, he was nominated for a Grammy Award for Best Contemporary Classical Composition for his chorus and orchestra work, The Here and Now, based on the poetry of Rumi. His Bassoon Concerto was nominated in 2017.

Theofanidis composed the ballet Artemis, which was premiered on May 20, 2003, by the American Ballet Theatre with choreography by Lar Lubovitch. He also wrote the orchestral work Muse for the Orpheus Chamber Orchestra (as part of their "New Brandenburg" series), which they premiered on December 1, 2007 at Carnegie Hall. His opera Heart of a Soldier, concerning 9/11, was premiered on September 10, 2011, by the San Francisco Opera in a production designed by Francesca Zambello. His opera/dramatic oratorio The Refuge, with a libretto by Leah Lax, was staged and premiered by the Houston Grand Opera on November 11, 2007. He has a long-standing relationship with the Atlanta Symphony, and his Symphony No. 1 was premiered by that orchestra on April 2, 2009, and recorded. He has served as a delegate to the U.S.–Japan Foundation's Leadership Program and is a former faculty member of the Peabody Conservatory and the Juilliard School. Since 2008, he has been on the faculty at the Yale School of Music.

== Awards ==
- 2017 Grammy nomination for Bassoon Concerto
- 2016 A.I. du Pont Composer's Award
- 2007 Grammy nomination for The Here and Now
- 2003 Masterprize for Rainbow Body
- 1999 Rome Prize
- 1996 Guggenheim Fellowship
- 1996 Barlow Prize
- Six ASCAP Morton Gould Prizes
- Fulbright Fellowship to France
- Tanglewood Fellowship
- Charles Ives Fellowship, by The American Academy of Arts and Letters
- Joseph H. Bearns Prize

== Selected compositions ==
Genre	Date	Title	Instrumentation	Notes
Chamber music	1992	Raga	for flute, clarinet, violin, cello, piano and 2 percussion	written for the Eastman Musica Nova
Piano	1992	Statues	for piano	
Chamber music	1994	Kaoru	for 2 flutes	written for Kaoru Hinata and Christopher Vaneman
Concertante	1995	Concerto	for alto saxophone and orchestra	
Orchestral	1995	This Dream, Strange and Moving	for orchestra	
Chamber music	1995	Ariel Ascending	for string quartet	
Orchestral	1996	Metaphysica	for orchestra	
Orchestral	1996	As Dancing Is to Architecture	for orchestra	commissioned by the California Symphony
Chamber music	1997	Visions and Miracles	for string quartet	
Chamber music	1997	Flow, My Tears	for violin, viola, or cello solo	written for Carol Rodland in memory of Jacob Druckman
Orchestral	1998	Flourishes	for orchestra	
Vocal	1999	Song of Elos	for soprano, string quartet and piano	
Chamber music	1999	O Vis Aeternitatis	for string quartet and piano	commissioned by the Norfolk Chamber Music Festival for Speculum Musicae
Orchestral	2000	Rainbow Body	for orchestra	
Concertante	1997–2002	Concerto	for bassoon and chamber orchestra	commissioned by the Absolute Ensemble for Martin Kuuskmann
Opera	2001	The Cows of Apollo or The Invention of Music		
Orchestral	2002	Peace, Love, Light YOUMEONE	for string orchestra	
Opera	2002	The Thirteen Clocks		in 2 acts; libretto by Peter Webster based on the story by James Thurber
Ballet	2003	Artemis		
Concertante	2002	Concerto: 1. Black Dancer, Black Thunder; 2. In the Questioning (a.k.a. Sorrow); 3. The Center of the Sky; 4. Lightning, with Life, in Four Colors Comes Down	for viola and chamber orchestra	commissioned by the Pro Arte Chamber Orchestra for Kim Kashkashian; recording by Richard O’Neill with David Alan Miller conducting the Albany Symphony, winner of the 2021 Grammy Award for Best Classical Instrumental Solo
Band	2005	I Wander the World in a Dream of My Own Making	for wind ensemble	
Choral	2005	The Here and Now	for soloists, chorus, and orchestra	commissioned by the Atlanta Symphony and Chorus
Chamber music	2006	The World Is Aflame	for violin and cello	
Concertante	2006	Concerto [No. 1]	for piano and chamber orchestra	commissioned by Pro Musica Columbus for Donald Berman
Piano	2007	All Dreams Begin with the Horizon	for piano	commissioned by Meet the Composer for Tanya Bannister
Choral	2007	The Refuge	for soloists, chorus, orchestra, and several non-Western ensembles	
Orchestral	2007	Muse	for strings and harpsichord	commissioned by the Orpheus Chamber Orchestra
Chamber music	2008, 2009	Fantasy	for violin and piano	chamber version of movement II of the Violin Concerto
Concertante	2008	Concerto	for violin and orchestra	commissioned by the Pittsburgh Symphony for Sarah Chang
Chamber music	2009	Summer Verses	for violin and cello	
Orchestral	2009	Symphony No. 1	for orchestra	commissioned by Robert Spano for the Atlanta Symphony Orchestra
Concertante	2009	Concerto	for cello and orchestra	commissioned by and written for Nina Kotova
Orchestral	2010	Une Certaine joie de vivre	for orchestra	
Opera	2011	Heart of a Soldier		for San Francisco Opera
Chamber music	2012	Allegory of the Cave	for string quartet and piano	
Piano	2012	Birichino (Italian: prankster)	for piano	7 minutes long commissioned by the 2013 Van Cliburn International Piano Competition for the 12 semifinal round performers; released on March 15, 2013
Concertante	2013	Concerto	for marimba and wind sinfonietta	
Chamber music	2013	Quasi una Fantasia	for 2 clarinets and string quartet (or string orchestra)	
Orchestral	2013	The Wind and Petit Jean	for orchestra	
Choral	2013	The Gift	for tenor, chorus, and orchestra	commissioned by the Pittsburgh Symphony Orchestra
Chamber music	2013	At the Still Point	for piano quintet	
Chamber music	2014	Artemis	for horn, string quintet, and keyboard	
Chamber music	2014	Five	for string quartet	
Orchestral	2014	The Legend of the Northern Lights	for narrator, child actor and orchestra (with film)	
Choral	2015	Creation/Creator	for soloists, chorus, and orchestra	commissioned by the Atlanta Symphony Orchestra
Orchestral	2015	Dreamtime Ancestors	for orchestra	
Orchestral	2015	Making Up for Lost Time	for orchestra	
Orchestral	2015	A Thousand Cranes	for string orchestra and harp	
Chamber music	2016	Airs and Dances	for 2 oboes, English horn, 2 bassoons, and percussionist	
Choral	2016	Four Levertov Settings	for chorus and solo violin	words by Denise Levertov
Orchestral	2016	Summer Music	for orchestra	Commissioned by the Williamsport Symphony for their 50th anniversary
Chamber music	2017	The Conference of the Birds	for string quartet	
Chamber music	2017	Four Dreams	for string quartet	commissioned by Apollo Chamber Players
Orchestral	2017	The Game	for orchestra	Commissioned by the Baltimore Symphony Orchestra
Chamber music	2017	Lakshmi and the Seed of Divine Desire	for flute and piano	
Chamber music	2017	One Thing at a Time, 6 Etude Miniatures	for flute solo	
Chamber music	2017	What Is the Word?	for string quartet and electronics	co-written with Mark Wingate; commissioned by the Apollo Chamber Players; words by Samuel Beckett
Concertante	2018	Concerto No. 2	for piano and string orchestra, harp, percussion	
Chamber music	2019	Discipline and Transcendence	for violin solo	written for the Elmar Oliveira International Violin Competition 2020
Concertante	2019	Drum Circles	for percussion quartet and orchestra	
Band	2019	Off the Clock	for concert band	
Chamber music	2019	Quintet	for clarinet and string quartet	
Orchestral	2020	On the Bridge of the Eternal	for orchestra	Written for the University of Colorado Boulder centennial
