= Robert Spano =

American conductor and pianist (born 1961)

Robert Spano (/ˈspænoʊ/ SPAN-oh; born 7 May 1961) is an American conductor and pianist. He is currently music director of the Fort Worth Symphony Orchestra, music director of the Aspen Music Festival and School, principal conductor of the Rhode Island Philharmonic Orchestra, and music director laureate of the Atlanta Symphony Orchestra (ASO).

== Biography ==
=== Early life ===
Spano was born in Conneaut, Ohio, and grew up in a musical family in Elkhart, Indiana. His father, Tony Spano, was a flute-builder and instrument-repairman as well as a clarinetist. Spano began making music early, studying piano, flute and violin. By the age of 14, he conducted a composition of his own with the local orchestra.

After graduating from Elkhart Central High School, he studied at the Oberlin Conservatory, where he earned a degree in piano performance, while also pursuing the violin and composition and studying conducting with Robert Baustian. After Oberlin, he studied at the Curtis Institute of Music in Philadelphia, where his mentors included Max Rudolf.

In 1985, Spano left Curtis to take his first professional position, director of orchestral activities at Bowling Green State University. In 1989, he returned to Oberlin, now as a faculty member, leading the Opera Theater program. He has maintained at least an official affiliation with Oberlin ever since.

=== Early career ===
In 1990, Spano was named as an assistant conductor with the Boston Symphony Orchestra. After leaving this post in 1993, he has been a regular guest conductor with the Boston Symphony and a teacher at the Tanglewood Music Center in the summertime. At Tanglewood, he headed the conductor training program from 1998 to 2002, and directed the Festival of Contemporary Music in 2003 and 2004. He has made appearances on the Late Show with David Letterman.

In 1995, Spano's first music directorship was announced, with the Brooklyn Philharmonic. He began his tenure in the fall of 1996. Over the next few years, despite multiple financial crises, Spano, the orchestra, and executive director Joseph Horowitz developed programs organized around intellectual, dramatic, or historical themes, with occasional incorporation of visual elements. In 2002, Spano announced his intention to step down from the Brooklyn post at the end of the 2003–2004 season, remaining as an advisor, and then principal guest conductor, until 2007.

=== Atlanta ===
In February 2000, the Atlanta Symphony Orchestra announced the appointment of Spano as its next music director, effective in 2001. The ASO has reported increased ticket sales and donations during Spano's tenure. Spano concluded his ASO music directorship at the close of the 2020–2021 season, and now has the title of music director laureate of the ASO.

During his ASO tenure, Spano has developed working relationships with contemporary composers such as Osvaldo Golijov, Jennifer Higdon, Christopher Theofanidis, Michael Gandolfi, and Adam Schoenberg, under the rubric of the "Atlanta School of Composers". Spano and the ASO have regularly recorded for Telarc, and more recently for Deutsche Grammophon, including compositions from the "Atlanta School of Composers".

== Additional work ==
Alongside conducting, Spano remains active as a pianist, performing frequently as a chamber musician. He also continues to compose his own music, though only in his time off from his performing career. Spano's work in opera has included conducting Seattle in cycles of Wagner's Der Ring des Nibelungen, in 2005 and in 2009. He made his guest-conducting debut with the Metropolitan Opera in New York on 19 October 2018, with the United States premiere of Nico Muhly's opera Marnie. including the final performance on 10 November 2018, which was part of the Metropolitan Opera Live in HD series.

In March 2019, the Fort Worth Symphony Orchestra (FWSO) announced the appointment of Spano as its new principal guest conductor, with immediate effect, with a contract through the 2022–2023 season, simultaneously with his debut as a guest conductor with the orchestra. In February 2021, the FWSO announced the appointment of Spano as its next music director, effective with the 2022–2023 season, with an initial contract of three years. His title changed from principal guest conductor to music director-designate of the FWSO on 1 April 2021.

Spano first guest-conducted the Rhode Island Philharmonic Orchestra (RI Philharmonic) in September 2023. In January 2024, the RI Philharmonic announced the appointment of Spano as its principal conductor, with immediate effect.

Spano first guest-conducted at Washington National Opera in 2021. In February 2024, Washington National Opera announced the appointment of Spano as its next music director, effective with the 2025–2026 season, with an initial contract of three seasons.

== Awards and honours ==
Spano was recognized with the Seaver/National Endowment for the Arts Conductors Award in 1994. He has also received honorary degrees from Bowling Green State University and the Curtis Institute of Music, and his recordings have won several Grammy Awards (see below). He was awarded the Ditson Conductor's Award in 2008. Musical America named Spano as its Conductor of the Year in 2008.

== Selected discography ==
All recordings feature Spano conducting the Atlanta Symphony Orchestra and its Chorus led by Norman Mackenzie (as appropriate). Additional featured soloists are noted.

- Rimsky-Korsakov: Scheherazade, Op. 35; Russian Easter Overture Telarc CD #80568 (2001). Cecylia Arzewski, solo violin.

Product page / Audio samples. Retrieved 2007-03-25

- Vaughan Williams: A Sea Symphony (Symphony #1). Telarc CD #80588 (2002). Christine Goerke, soprano; Brett Polegato, baritone; ASO Chorus

Awards: Grammy Awards for Best Classical Album, Best Choral Performance, and Best Engineered Album, 2003.

Product page / Audio samples. Retrieved 25 March 2007

- Theofanidis: Rainbow Body; Barber: Symphony No.1, Op. 9; Copland: Suite from Appalachian Spring; Higdon: blue cathedral. Telarc CD #80596 (2003).

Product page / Audio samples. Retrieved 25 March 2007

- Higdon: City Scape; Concerto for Orchestra. Telarc CD #80620 (2004).

Product page / Audio samples. Retrieved 25 March 2007

- Berlioz: Requiem, Op. 5 (Grande Messe des Morts). Telarc CD #80627 SACD #60627 (2004). Frank Lopardo, tenor; ASO Chorus.

Awards: Grammy Award for Best Choral Performance, 2005.

Product page / Audio samples. Retrieved 25 March 2007

- Del Tredici: Paul Revere's Ride; Theofanidis: The Here and Now; Bernstein: "Lamentation" from Symphony No. 1 (Jeremiah). Telarc CD #80638 (2005). Hila Plitmann, soprano; Richard Clement, tenor; Brett Polegato, baritone; Nancy Maultsby, mezzo-soprano.

Awards: Gramophone Magazine "Editor's Choice" (December 2005).

Product page / Audio samples. Retrieved 25 March 2007

- Sibelius: Kullervo, Op. 7. Telarc CD #80665 (2006). Charlotte Hellekant, soprano; Nathan Gunn, baritone; Men of the ASO Chorus

Product page / Audio samples. Retrieved 25 March 2007

- Golijov: Ainadamar (Fountain of Tears) Deutsche Grammophon CD #477 616-5 (2006). Dawn Upshaw, soprano; Jessica Rivera, soprano; Kelley O'Connor, mezzo-soprano; Ladies of the Atlanta Symphony Orchestra Chorus

Awards: Grammy Awards for Best Opera Recording, Best Classical Contemporary Composition, 2006.

Product page / Audio samples. Retrieved 25 March 2007

- Tallis: Why Fum'th in Fight; Vaughan Williams: Symphony No. 5/Fantasia on a Theme by Thomas Tallis/Serenade to Music Telarc CD# 80676 (2007) Jessica Rivera, soprano; Kelley O'Connor, mezzo-soprano; Thomas Studebaker, tenor; Nmon Ford, baritone; ASO Chamber Chorus
- Christopher Theofanidis: Symphony No. 1; Peter Lieberson: Neruda Songs; Atlanta Symphony Orchestra; Kelley O'Connor, mezzo-soprano; ASO Media (2011) CD 1002

== Sources ==
- Davidson, Justin. "Measure for Measure: Exploring the mysteries of conducting". The New Yorker – 21 August 2006, pp. 60–69. (Conversations with Spano frame an essay on the nature of conducting.)

Cultural offices
Preceded by Dennis Russell Davies	Music Director, Brooklyn Philharmonic; 1996–2004	Succeeded by Michael Christie
Preceded by Yoel Levi	Music Director, Atlanta Symphony Orchestra; 2001–2021	Succeeded by Nathalie Stutzmann
Preceded by Miguel Harth-Bedoya	Music Director, Fort Worth Symphony Orchestra; 2022–present	Succeeded by incumbent
Preceded by Bramwell Tovey (music director)	Principal Conductor, Rhode Island Philharmonic Orchestra; 2024–2025	Succeeded by Ruth Reinhardt (music director)
Preceded by Evan Rogister (principal conductor)	Music Director, Washington National Opera; 2025–present	Succeeded by incumbent
