= Concerto for Orchestra =

Orchestral piece which features the entire ensemble

Although a concerto is usually a piece of music for one or more solo instruments accompanied by a full orchestra, several composers have written works with the apparently contradictory title Concerto for Orchestra. This title is usually chosen to emphasise soloistic and virtuosic treatment of various individual instruments or sections in the orchestra, with emphasis on instruments changing during the piece. It differs from sinfonia concertante in that it has no soloist or group of soloists that remains the same throughout the composition.

A well-known concerto for orchestra is Béla Bartók's Concerto for Orchestra (1943), although the title had been used several times before. Goffredo Petrassi made the concerto for orchestra something of a speciality, writing eight of them since 1933. He finished the last one in 1972.

== For symphony orchestra ==
This list is chronological.

- Concerto for Orchestra, Op. 38, by Paul Hindemith (1925)
- Concerto for Orchestra, by Lucijan Marija Škerjanc (1926)
- Concerto for Orchestra, by Vagn Holmboe (1929)
- Concerto for Orchestra, by Tadeusz Szeligowski (1930)
- Concerto for Orchestra, Op. 43, by Adolf Busch (published 1931)
- Concerto for Orchestra, by Gian Francesco Malipiero (1931)
- Concerto for Orchestra, Op. 24, by Knudåge Riisager (1931)
- Philharmonic Concerto, by Paul Hindemith (1932)
- Concerto per orchestra in Do maggiore, by Mario Pilati (1933)
- Concerto for Orchestra, by Walter Piston (1933), which is based in part on Hindemith's work
- Concerto for Orchestra, by Goffredo Petrassi (1934)
- Concerto per orchestra, Op. 61, by Alfredo Casella (1937)
- Concerto for Orchestra, by Zoltán Kodály (1939–40)
- Concerto for Orchestra in one movement, by Ellis Kohs (1941)
- Concerto for Orchestra (Based on Red Army Themes), by Richard Mohaupt (1942–43)
- Concerto for Orchestra, by Béla Bartók (1943)
- Concerto for Orchestra, by Morton Gould (1944)
- Concerto for Orchestra, by Ulysses Kay (1948)
- Concerto No. 1 for Orchestra 'Arevakal', Op. 88, by Alan Hovhaness (1951)
- Concerto No. 2 for Orchestra, by Goffredo Petrassi (1951)
- Concerto No. 4 for Orchestra, Op. 98, No. 2, by Alan Hovhaness (1952)
- Concerto No. 7 for Orchestra, Op. 116, by Alan Hovhaness (1953)
- Concerto No. 3 for Orchestra, by Goffredo Petrassi (1953)
- Concerto for Orchestra, by Tadeusz Baird (1953)
- Concerto for Orchestra, by Witold Lutosławski (1950–54), which won him the UNESCO 1st prize in 1963.
- Concerto for Orchestra, "À Darius Milhaud" by Alexandre Tansman (1954)
- Concerto No. 4 for Orchestra, by Goffredo Petrassi (1954)
- Concerto for Orchestra, by Howard Swanson (1954)
- Concerto for Orchestra, by Anatol Vieru (1954–55)
- Concerto No. 5 for Orchestra, by Goffredo Petrassi (1955)
- Concerto No. 8 for Orchestra, Op. 117, by Alan Hovhaness (1957)
- Concerto No. 6 for Orchestra, by Goffredo Petrassi (1957)
- Concerto for Orchestra, by Arnold Walter (1958)
- Concerto for Orchestra, by Carlos Surinach (1959)
- Concerto for Orchestra (in One Movement), by Theron Kirk (1960)
- Concerto for Orchestra, by Giya Kancheli (1961)
- Concerto for Orchestra, by Benjamin Lees (1961)
- Concerto for Orchestra, by Grażyna Bacewicz (1962)
- Concerto for Orchestra, by Michael Tippett (1962–63)
- Concerto No. 7 for Orchestra, by Goffredo Petrassi (1963–64)
- Concerto for Orchestra No. 1, Naughty Limericks, by Rodion Shchedrin (1963)
- Concerto for Orchestra, by Havergal Brian (1964)
- Métaboles, by Henri Dutilleux (1964)
- Concerto for Orchestra, by Nikolai Lopatnikoff (1964)
- Concerto for orchestra, by Akira Miyoshi (1964)
- Concerto for Orchestra, by Robert Gerhard (1965)
- Concerto for Orchestra No. 1, Gala Music, by Gunther Schuller (1966)
- Concerto for Orchestra, Op. 8, by Robin Holloway (1967)
- Concerto for Orchestra, by Thea Musgrave (1967)
- Satire: Concerto for Orchestra, by Ezra Laderman (1968)
- Concerto for Orchestra No. 2, The Chimes, by Rodion Shchedrin (1968)
- Concerto for Orchestra by Oliver Knussen (1969)
- Concerto for Orchestra, by Elliott Carter (1969)
- Concerto for Orchestra, by Dimitar Tapkoff (1969)
- Concerto for Orchestra, by Samuel Adler (1971)
- Concerto for Orchestra by Aleksandra Pakhmutova (1971)
- Concerto No. 8 for Orchestra, by Goffredo Petrassi (1970–72)
- Concerto for Orchestra (Carpathian), by Myroslav Skoryk (1972)
- Concerto for Orchestra, by Richard Rodney Bennett (1973)
- Concerto for orchestra, by Anthony Payne (1974)
- Philharmonic Concerto, Op. 120, by Malcolm Arnold (1976)
- Concerto for Orchestra No. 2, by Gunther Schuller (1976)
- Second Concerto for Orchestra, Op. 40, by Robin Holloway (1978)
- Concerto for Orchestra, by Henri Lazarof (1978)
- Concerto Festivo, for orchestra without conductor, by Andrzej Panufnik (1979)
- Concerto for Orchestra, by Roger Sessions (1979–81), which won him the Pulitzer Prize for Music in 1982.
- Concerto for Orchestra, by Paul Patterson (composer) (1981)
- Concerto for Orchestra (Suite), by Alexandre Tansman (1981)
- Concerto for Orchestra, by John McCabe (1982)
- Concerto for Orchestra, by Stephen Paulus (1983)
- Concerto for Orchestra, by Edward Gregson (1983) (revised versions 1989 and 2001)
- Concerto for Orchestra, by Robert Saxton (1984)
- Concerto for Orchestra No. 3, Farbenspiel, by Gunther Schuller (1985)
- Concerto for Orchestra, by Alun Hoddinott (1986)
- Concerto for Orchestra, by Karel Husa (1986)
- Second Concerto for Orchestra: Icarus, by Henri Lazarof (1986)
- Concerto for Orchestra, by Shulamit Ran (1986)
- Concerto for Orchestra No. 1, by Steven Stucky (1986–87)
- Concerto for Orchestra, by Leonard Bernstein (1986–89), which is also known as "Jubilee Games" for orchestra and baritone.
- Third Concerto for Orchestra, Op. 80, by Robin Holloway (1981–94)
- Concerto for Orchestra (Variations without a theme), by Denys Bouliane (1985–95)
- Concerto for Orchestra, by John Biggs (1988)
- Concerto for Double Orchestra, by Ezra Laderman (1989)
- Concerto for Orchestra No. 3, Old Russian Circus Music, by Rodion Shchedrin (1989)
- Concerto for Orchestra No. 4, Round Dances (Khorovody), by Rodion Shchedrin (1989)
- Concerto for Orchestra, by Joan Tower (1991)
- Concerto for Orchestra – Zoroastrian Riddles, by Richard Danielpour (1996)
- Strathclyde Concerto No. 10: Concerto for Orchestra, by Peter Maxwell Davies (1996)
- Concerto for Orchestra, by Dinos Constantinides (1997)
- Concerto for Orchestra No. 5, Four Russian Songs, by Rodion Shchedrin (1998)
- Concerto for Orchestra (reseated), by Augusta Read Thomas (1998)
- Concerto for Orchestra, by Stanisław Skrowaczewski (1999)
- Boston Concerto, by Elliott Carter (2002)
- Concerto for Orchestra by Jennifer Higdon (2002)
- Yi°: Concerto for Orchestra, by Tan Dun (2002)
- Concerto for Orchestra, Op. 81 by Lowell Liebermann (2002)
- Concerto for Orchestra, by Magnus Lindberg (2003)
- Second Concerto for Orchestra, by Steven Stucky (2003), which won him the Pulitzer Prize for Music in 2005
- Concerto for Orchestra, by David Horne (2003–04)
- Concerti for Orchestra, by Milton Babbitt (2004)
- Concierto para orquestra, by Agustí Charles (2004)
- Concerto for Orchestra: Zodiac Tales, by Bright Sheng (2005, rev. 2016)
- Fourth Concerto for Orchestra, Op. 101 by Robin Holloway (2004–06)
- Concerto for Orchestra by Fabian Müller (2007-2008)
- Concerto for Orchestra, by Christopher Rouse (2007–2008)
- Concerto for Orchestra, by Rolf Martinsson (2008)
- Symphony No. 5 (Concerto for Orchestra), by Ellen Taaffe Zwilich (2008)
- Fifth Concerto for Orchestra, Op. 107, by Robin Holloway (2009–10)
- Cascade (Symphony No. 2), Concerto for Orchestra, by Douglas Knehans (2010)
- Morning in Long Island, Concert No. 1 for orchestra, by Pascal Dusapin (2011)
- Concerto for Orchestra, by Marc Neikrug (2012)
- Morpheus, by Søren Nils Eichberg (2012)
- Godai; The five elements, Concerto for orchestra by Benjamin Staern (2012–13)
- Concerto for Orchestra, by Thierry Escaich (2014)
- Concerto for Orchestra, by John Plant (2014)
- Concerto for Orchestra, by Michael Torke (2014)
- Concerto for Orchestra, by Carl Vine (2014)
- FLEX, Concerto for Orchestra, by Sebastian Currier (2015)
- Concerto for Orchestra, by Zhou Tian (2016)
- Walkabout: Concerto for Orchestra, by Gabriela Lena Frank (2016)
- Concerto for Orchestra, by André Previn (2016)
- Hominum—Concerto for Orchestra, by Gabriela Ortiz (2016)
- SPIRA, by Unsuk Chin (2019)
- Torus, Concerto for Orchestra, by Emily Howard (2019)
- Concerto for Orchestra, by Eric Nathan (2019)
- Concerto for Orchestra, by George Benjamin (2021)
- Concerto for Curved Space, by Steven Mackey (2022)
- Concerto for Orchestra, by Kevin Puts (2022)
- Cloud slant, after three paintings by Helen Frankenthaler: Concerto for Orchestra, by Kenneth Fuchs (2023)
- Concerto for Orchestra, by Robin Haigh (2023)
- Concerto for Orchestra, by James MacMillan (2023)
- Wake Up! Concerto for Orchestra, by Carlos Simon (2023)
- Classic of Mountains and Seas Concerto for Orchestra, by Zhou Long (2024)
- Concerto for Orchestra, by Brian Raphael Nabors (2024)
- Concerto for Orchestra, by Huw Watkins (2024–25)
- Concerto for Orchestra, by Michael Berkeley (2025)
- Concerto for Orchestra, by Wynton Marsalis (2025)

== For string orchestra ==
- Concerto for Strings in G major, RV 151, Concerto alla rustica, by Antonio Vivaldi (between the mid-1720s and 1730)
- Concertino for string orchestra, by Eugene Goossens (composer) (1928)
- Concerto for Double String Orchestra, by Michael Tippett (1938–39)
- Concertino Pastorale, by John Ireland (composer) (1939)
- Konzert für Streichorchester op. 20, by Boris Blacher (1940)
- Concerto per orchestra d'archi, by Hilding Rosenberg (1946)
- Concerto in D by Igor Stravinsky (1946)
- Concerto for String Orchestra, by Grażyna Bacewicz (1948)
- Concerto for Strings, by Earl George (1948)
- Concerto for String Orchestra, by Alan Rawsthorne (1949)
- Concerto for String Orchestra No. 1, by Allan Pettersson (1949–50)
- Konzert für Streichorchester, Op. 40 No. 1, by Johann Nepomuk David (1950)
- Concerto for String Orchestra, by Everett Helm (1950)
- Zweites Konzert für Streichorchester, Op. 40 No. 2, by Johann Nepomuk David (1951)
- Concertino for string orchestra (No. 1), by Samuel Adler (composer) (1954)
- Concerto for String Orchestra No. 2, by Allan Pettersson (1956)
- Concerto for String Orchestra No. 3, by Allan Pettersson (1956–57)
- Concerto for Strings, by Paul Ben-Haim (1957)
- Concertino for strygeorkester, by Flemming Weis (1960)
- Concerto per corde, by Alberto Ginastera (1966)
- Concertino No. 2 for string orchestra, by Samuel Adler (1976)
- Concerto per archi, by Nino Rota (1964–65, nuova revisione 1977)
- Concerto for string orchestra, by Carlos Surinach (1978)
- Concerto for String Orchestra, op. 51 (1981) (based on op. 16, 1957), by John La Montaine
- Concertino No. 3 for string orchestra, by Samuel Adler (1993)
- Concertino No. 4 for string orchestra, by Samuel Adler (2023)

== For chamber orchestra ==
- Concerto for Nine Instruments, Op. 24, by Anton Webern (1924)
- Concert pour petit orchestre op. 34, by Albert Roussel (1927)
- Concertino lirico, by Nikolai Myaskovsky (1930)
- Concerto for Chamber Orchestra, by George Antheil (1932)
- Concerto for Small Orchestra, by Hunter Johnson (composer) (1936)
- Dumbarton Oaks, Concerto in Eb pour orchestre de chambre, by Igor Stravinsky (1938)
- Concerto for Chamber Orchestra in Two Parts, by David Diamond (composer), 1940
- Concerto for small orchestra, by Bernhard Heiden (1949)
- La Jolla Concerto for (Chamber) Orchestra, by John Vincent (composer) (1959, rev. 1966 & 1973)
- Concertino for (chamber) orchestra, op. 28, by Gene Gutchë (1960)
- Cheltenham Concerto, per orchestra da camera, by George Rochberg 1960
- Concerto for chamber orchestra, op. 40, by Alan Leichtling (1966)
- Classic Concerto for chamber orchestra, op. 44, by Gene Gutchë (1967)
- Chamber Concerto, for 13 instrumentalists by György Ligeti (1969–70)
- Concerto for small orchestra, by David Diamond (composer) (1970)
- Concerto Grosso (for chamber orchestra), by Margaret Lucy Wilkins (1970)
- Kammerkonzert by Manfred Trojahn (1973)
- Concerto for Chamber Orchestra, by Robert Capanna (1974)
- Concertino for Chamber Orchestra, by Roger Sessions (1974)
- First Light, Concerto for Chamber Orchestra in one movement, by Richard Danielpour (1988)
- Concerto for Orchestra by John Woolrich (1999)
- Asko Concerto by Elliott Carter (2000)
- Rain of Tears by Chinary Ung (2006)
- Chamber Concerto for chamber orchestra, by James M. Stephenson (2009)

== For wind orchestra ==
Works variously titled for band, wind orchestra, and wind ensemble:

- Concerto for 23 Winds, by Walter S. Hartley (1957)
- Concerto for Wind Orchestra, by Colin McPhee (1959)
- Concerto for Wind Orchestra, by Quincy Porter (1959)
- Concerto for Wind Orchestra, Op. 41, by Nikolai Lopatnikoff (1963)
- Concerto for Winds, Brass and Percussion, by Samuel Adler (composer) (1968)
- Concerto for Band, by Gordon Jacob (1970)
- Concierto para banda: 1.Allegro, 2.Lento, 3.Allegro, by Amando Blanquer Ponsoda (1970–71)
- Concerto for Band, by Robert E. Jager (1980)
- Concerto for Band, by Verne Reynolds (1980)
- Concerto for Wind Ensemble, by Karel Husa (1982)
- Concerto for Band, by David Stanhope (2001)
- Concerto for Band, by Lukas Foss (2002)
- Concerto for Wind Ensemble, by Steven Bryant (2006–07)
- Luminosity, Concerto for Wind Orchestra, by Joseph Schwantner (2014)
- Concerto for Wind Orchestra, by Chang-Su Koh (2016)
- Concerto for Wind Ensemble, by Kevin Day (2021)
- Concerto for Wind Ensemble "Games", by James M. Stephenson (2022)

== See also ==
- Concerto for Group and Orchestra, album by Deep Purple and the Royal Philharmonic Orchestra
