= Margaret Wilkins =

Margaret Wilkins may refer to:

- Margaret Lucy Wilkins (born 1939), English composer and music educator
- Margaret Wilkins, character in Jennings (novels)
- Margaret Wilkins, character in The Family (1974 UK TV series)
