= Portland Stage Company =

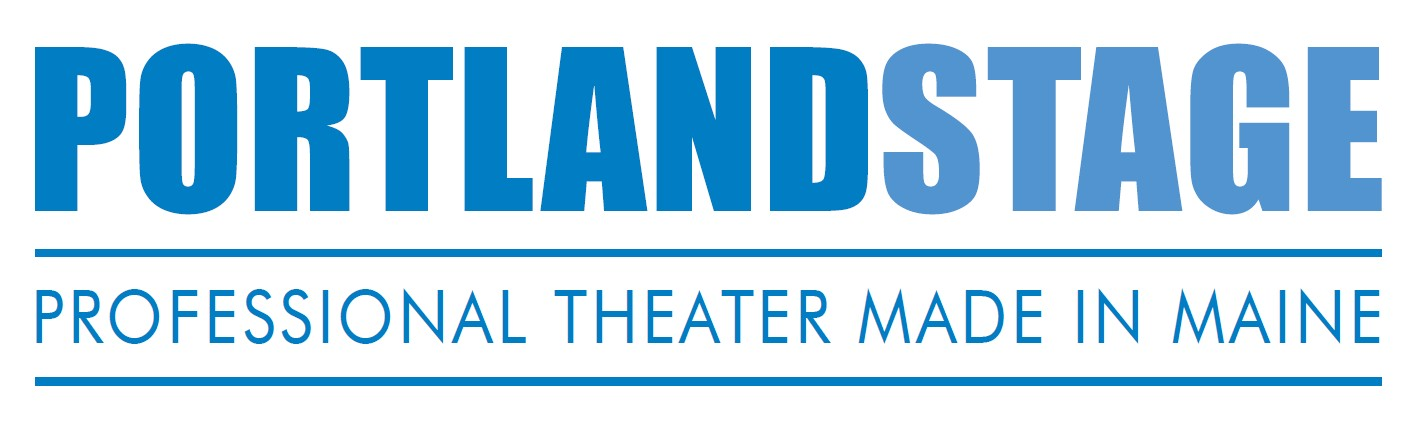
- Address: 25A Forest Avenue; Portland, ME; United States
- Type: LORT

Construction
- Opened: 1974

Website
- www.portlandstage.org

Portland Stage Company is a professional LORT (League of Resident Theaters) theater company in the state of Maine. Founded as the Profile Theatre in 1974 as a touring theater company, the company made Portland its permanent location in 1976. In 1982, it moved to its current home of 25A Forest Avenue in Portland, Maine. Anita Stewart has served as the Artistic Director since 1996, and in 2006 was made Executive Director.

== History ==
Portland Stage Company was founded in 1974 as the Profile Theatre, a touring company of young theater professionals, with the mission to "entertain, educate, and engage its audiences by producing a wide range of artistic works and programs that explore basic human issues and concerns relevant to the communities served by the theater." The first Artistic Director, Ted Davis (1974-1976) initially led the company through performances in a wide variety of venues, but by 1976, Portland had become the company's permanent home. Davis was followed as Artistic Director by Michael Rafkin (1976-1977) and Frank Goodman (1977-1978), and in 1978, the company changed its name to Portland Stage Company.

In the years that followed, under Artistic Director Charles Towers (1978-1981), Portland Stage, became a member of LORT (the League of Resident Theatres) and TCG (Theatre Communications Group) and signed a letter of agreement with Actors' Equity Association. In 1982, under the leadership of Barbara Rosoff (1981-1987), Portland Stage moved to its current home, a former Oddfellows Hall at 25A Forest Avenue in Portland, which at the time had been newly renovated as the Portland Performing Arts Center.

Since the 1980s, Portland Stage has been committed to offering student matinees of every show in its mainstage season. Today, over 4,000 students from Maine and New Hampshire attend these performances each year. Under Artistic Director Richard Hamburger (1986-1992), the company launched the Little Festival of the Unexpected in 1990, a week-long annual festival that brings playwrights from around the country to develop new plays at Portland Stage. The Little Festival has helped writers such as Mac Wellman, Nicky Silver, Douglas Carter Beane, Nilo Cruz, Quiara Alegría Hudes, and John Cariani land productions both on Portland Stage's Mainstage and in regional theaters around the country.

Hamburger was followed as Artistic Director by Greg Leaming (1992-1996), and then in 1996 by the team of Christopher Akerlind and Anita Stewart. Akerlind, a lighting designer, and Stewart, a set designer, were at the time the only designers to head a regional theater in the United States. Under their leadership, Portland Stage began a holiday tradition of producing Charles Dickens' A Christmas Carol each December. Akerlind and Stewart also continued the theater's commitment to new work, launching the From Away festival in 1996, an annual collaboration with the International Writing Program at the University of Iowa that brings authors from around the world to Portland each fall for staged readings of their work in translation.

In 1998, Christopher Akerlind left Portland Stage Company and Anita Stewart (1998–present) became the sole Artistic Director. In 2000, Portland Stage purchased the Portland Performing Arts Center where it is located. Since taking ownership of the building, Portland Stage has dramatically expanded its audience base, formed an Affiliate Artists group of local theater professionals, and launched a second season of productions, the Studio Series, which debuted in 2007.

At the end of their 2011–12 season Portland Stage Company had produced 332 plays and counting, including 45 world premieres.

== Theater for Kids and Education ==
Theater for Kids opened its doors in January 2010 in one of Portland Stage's storefront spaces as the new arm of Portland Stage outreach. Geared at children ages 4–10, Theater for Kids' main offering is "Play Me a Story," where Affiliate Artists, a group of theater professionals connected with the theater, read and act out popular children's stories followed by acting workshops. Affiliate Artists help bring "Play Me A Story" on tour to local schools in the area, as well as work as instructors for summer and school vacation camps.

Portland Stage also seeks to educate the next generation of theater artists by hiring 10-11 interns every year. The interns are hired into different fields from production to administration and have intensive hands-on experience in each of their departments during a 7-show season. Interns from Portland Stage have gone on to work at Berkeley Repertory Theatre, Houston Grand Opera, Manhattan Theater Club, Cleveland Playhouse and more.

== New Work and The Clauder Competition ==
Portland Stage has shown a commitment to new work. Since 1990, the Little Festival of the Unexpected has performed readings of 3-5 new plays to the public every year. Plays workshopped here will sometimes be moved to Portland Stage's mainstage in coming seasons. Since 1996, in partnership with the International Writer's Program at the University of Iowa, Portland Stage has presented "From Away" every year to showcase work of international playwrights in translation.

Additionally, Portland Stage adjudicates the Clauder Competition for New England Playwrights. The competition was started in 1981 and has been adjudicated by Portland Stage since 1999 Portland Stage has adjudicated the competition on a 3-year cycle. Past winners have been: (2000) Laura Harrington "Hallowed Ground", (2003) Quiara Alegría Hudes "Yemaya's Belly", (2006) William Donnelly "Magnetic North", and (2009) Gregory Hischak "The Center of Gravity".

== A Christmas Carol ==
Each December, Portland Stage presents a production of Charles Dickens' 1843 work A Christmas Carol. In 2020, actor Joel Leffert created an original adaptation of the play to make it a one-man show to meet COVID-19 restrictions. A video version of the production was available for streaming on-demand. In 2021, Portland Stage couldn't present the show on stage because of the COVID-19 pandemic and instead produced a digital-on-demand version for audiences. Portland Stage first produced A Christmas Carol in 1975. Since 1996, the theatre company has produced A Christmas Carol or another Christmas-themed production each December.
