= Concerto for Orchestra (Carter) =

1969 composition by Elliott Carter

The Concerto for Orchestra is a four-movement concerto for orchestra written in 1969 by the American composer Elliott Carter. The work was commissioned by the New York Philharmonic to commemorate their 125th anniversary and was premiered by the orchestra under the conductor Leonard Bernstein in the Philharmonic Hall, New York City, on February 5, 1970.

== Composition ==
The piece has a duration of approximately 22 minutes and is composed in four movements:

1. Allegro
2. Presto volando
3. Maestoso
4. Allegro agitato

To compose the work, Carter split the orchestra into four harmonically juxtaposing sections designated by musical range: high, middle-high, middle-low, and low. Additionally, different percussion instruments were assigned to accompany each of the four sections.

=== Instrumentation ===
The work is scored for an orchestra comprising three flutes (2nd and 3rd doubling piccolo), three oboes (3rd doubling cor anglais), three clarinets (2nd doubling bass clarinet, 3rd doubling E-flat clarinet), two bassoons, contrabassoon (doubling bassoon), four horns, three trumpets, two trombones, bass trombone, tuba, timpani, six percussionists, harp, piano, and strings.

== Reception ==
The Concerto for Orchestra has been praised by musician and critics alike. The cellist Fred Sherry (who performed the first recording of Carter's Cello Concerto) described the Concerto for Orchestra as one of three Carter pieces he would "recommend to every music lover", including A Symphony of Three Orchestras and Symphonia: sum fluxae pretium spei. Tom Service of The Guardian similarly praised the work as "an incandescent blaze of musical poetry."

David Patrick Stearns of The Philadelphia Inquirer described his first experience with the piece (and of Carter's music), writing, "My own journey with Carter began in the late 1990s with a recording of his Concerto for Orchestra, often thought to be one of his difficult works. I was prepared to be baffled. Then I realized that all his music required was the kind of keen attention you'd give to driving down the Brooklyn–Queens Expressway. What's the problem? The music is, if anything, too rich."
