= Anna in the Tropics =

Play written by Nilo Cruz

- Original language: English
- Written by: Nilo Cruz
- Characters: Santiago; Cheché; Ofelia; Marela; Conchita; Palomo; Juan Julian; Eliades
- Setting: 1929, Ybor City, Tampa, Florida

Premiere
- Date: 12 October 2002
- Place: New Theatre, Coral Gables, Florida

Anna in the Tropics is a play by Nilo Cruz. It won the 2003 Pulitzer Prize for Drama.

== Plot ==
The play is set in Ybor City, a section of Tampa and the center of the cigar industry. When Cuban immigrants brought the cigar-making industry to Florida in the 20th century, they carried with them another tradition. As the workers toiled away in the factory hand rolling each cigar, the lector, historically well-dressed and well-spoken, would read to them. It was the lector who informed, organized and entertained the workers until the 1930s, when the rollers and the readers were replaced by mechanization.

In the play, the lector reads Anna Karenina, sparking the characters' lives and relationships to spin out of control.

== Characters ==
- Santiago, owner of a cigar factory, late 50s
- Cheché, his half-brother, half-Cuban, half-American, early 40s
- Ofelia, Santiago's wife, 50s
- Marela, Ofelia and Santiago's daughter, 22
- Conchita, Marela's sister, 32
- Palomo, Conchita's husband, 41
- Juan Julián, the lector, 38
- Elíades, local gamester, runs cockfights, 40s

== Productions ==
Anna in the Tropics was commissioned and originally produced by New Theatre, Coral Gables, Florida, Rafael del Acha, Artistic Director, Eileen Suarez, Managing Director, in 2002 with support from the NEA/TCG Theatre Residency Program for Playwrights.

The South Coast Repertory presented the play on its Julianne Argyros Stage. It ran from 28 September to 19 October 2003. Directed by Juliette Carrillo, the cast included Jonathan Nichols (Eliades/Palomo), Tony Plana (Santiago), Geoffrey Rivas (Cheché), Onahoua Rodriguez (Marela), Adriana Sevan (Conchita), Karmín Murcelo (Ofelia) and Julian Acosta (Juan Julian).

The play started performances on Broadway at the Royale Theatre (since renamed Bernard B. Jacobs Theatre) on November 4, 2003, opening on November 16. Directed by Emily Mann, the cast included Jimmy Smits (Juan Julian), Priscilla Lopez (Ofelia), Daphne Rubin-Vega (Conchita), Victor Argo (Santiago), Vanessa Aspilaga (Marela), John Ortiz (Eliades/Palomo) and David Zayas (Cheché). The play closed on February 22, 2004, after 15 previews and 113 performances

The first U.S. national tour starting in September 2004 and ending in February 2005 was a co-production between Dallas Theater Center, Arizona Theatre Company, and Pasadena Playhouse. Directed by Richard Hamburger, the cast included Al Espinosa (Juan Julián), Jacqueline Duprey (Conchita), Timothy Paul Perez (Eliades/Palomo), Apollo Dukakis (Santiago), Javi Mulero (Cheché), Adriana Gaviria (Marela), and Karmín Murcelo (Ofelia).

L.A. Theatre Works presented Anna in the Tropics as part of its 2004–2005 season. Directed by Jose Luis Valenzuela, the cast included Jimmy Smits, Onahoua Rodriguez, Adriana Sevan, Jonathan Nichols, Winston Rocha, and Herbert Siguenza.

On September 16, 2005, and translated as Ana en el trópico, the Spanish version opened in Madrid at the Teatro Alcázar and was directed by Nilo Cruz himself. The cast included: Luis Fernando Alvés (Palomo/Elíades), Joan Crosas (Santiago), José Pedro Carrión (Cheché), Toni Acosta (Marela), Lolita Flores (Chonchita), Teresa María Rojas (Ofelia), Pablo Duran (Juan Julián), Itziar Arza, Alfonso Ramos and Marian Sanz de Acedo (cigarreras/os).

The play was presented in the UK at the Hampstead Theatre in London. Directed by Indra Rubasingham, it ran from 30 November 2005 to 15 January 2006. The cast included Diana Quick, Rachael Stirling and Joseph Mydell.

Due to the coronavirus pandemic lockdown, Repertory Philippines' production of "Anna in the Tropics" closed on March 13, 2020, after two previews. The production was designed and directed by Joey Mendoza.

The play received a regional production at the Barrington Stage Company in Pittsfield, Massachusetts, running from July 16 to July 30, 2022, on the Boyd-Quinson Stage. Directed by Elena Araoz, the production featured a cast including Wilson Jermaine Heredia (Palomo/Elíades), Marina Pires (Conchita), Alex Rodriguez (Juan Julián), Gabriela Saker (Marela), Alexis Cruz (Cheche), Blanca Camacho (Ofelia) and Gilbert Cruz (Santiago). Part of the company’s 2022 summer season, the production was noted for its ensemble performances and its exploration of the play’s central themes of desire, tradition, and transformation..

== Recognition ==
Anna in the Tropics was widely regarded as a "long shot" for the 2003 Pulitzer Prize for Drama, mainly because it had not been seen in New York City. The play premiered at the New Theatre in Coral Gables, Florida, and had to compete with Edward Albee's The Goat, or Who Is Sylvia? and Richard Greenberg's Take Me Out for the coveted award.

Cruz, a Cuban-born playwright living in New York, remarked,

It's wonderful. I cannot believe it. The other day I went to the bookstore and I saw a book by William Kennedy. He won the Pulitzer for Ironweed, which I adore. I was standing there looking at his books and thinking how amazing it was that this writer won a Pulitzer, and now I've been given one, too. I think I'm still in shock. I haven't completely acknowledged the grandness of the award.

His past works, such as Two Sisters and a Piano, have earned him a reputation for writing lyrical, atmospheric plays with powerful emotions and language.

Anna in the Tropics was honored with two nominations at the 2004 Tony Awards. The show was nominated in the category of Best Play and Best Featured Actress in a Play (Daphne Rubin-Vega)

== Adaptations ==
The Hollywood Reporter reports that Academy Award nominee, Lee Daniels (Precious) has signed on to develop a film based on the play—which is being produced by Mankind Entertainment.

Pulitzer Prize-winning composer and longtime collaborator of Cruz, Gabriela Lena Frank, will premiere an opera based on the play at the Houston Grand Opera in 2028, starring soprano Ailyn Pérez.

== Awards and nominations ==
=== Original Broadway production ===
Year	Award	Category	Nominee	Result
2003	Pulitzer Prize	Drama	Nilo Cruz	Won
2004	Tony Awards	Best Play		Nominated
2004	Tony Awards	Best Featured Actress in a Play	Daphne Rubin-Vega	Nominated
