= Symphonia: sum fluxae pretium spei =

The Symphonia: sum fluxae pretium spei is an orchestral triptych by the American composer Elliott Carter. Its three movements were composed between 1993 and 1995. The complete work was first performed on April 25, 1998, at Bridgewater Hall, Manchester by the BBC Symphony Orchestra under the conductor Oliver Knussen. The second movement "Adagio tenebroso" was a finalist for the 1996 Pulitzer Prize for Music. The third movement "Allegro scorrevole" won The Prince Pierre of Monaco Music Composition Prize in 1998.

== Composition ==
The Symphonia: sum fluxae pretium spei has a total duration of roughly 47 minutes, though its movements can be performed separately. The title comes from the Latin poem "Bulla" by the English poet Richard Crashaw and translates into English as "I am the prize of flowing hope."

=== Partita ===
The first movement "Partita" was commissioned by the Chicago Symphony Orchestra, which premiered the work under the conductor Daniel Barenboim at Symphony Center, Chicago on February 17, 1994. "Partita" has a duration of approximately 17 minutes. The title refers to the modern Italian language word for "game" rather than the Baroque dance suite.

=== Adagio tenebroso ===
The second movement "Adagio tenebroso" was commissioned by the BBC to celebrate the 100th anniversary of The Proms. It was composed in 1994 and was first performed at the Royal Albert Hall, London on September 13, 1995, by the BBC Symphony Orchestra under the conductor Andrew Davis. The piece is dedicated to the Proms and to Amira and Alexander Goehr. "Adagio tenebroso" has a duration of approximately 20 minutes.

=== Allegro scorrevole ===
The third movement "Allegro scorrevole" was commissioned by the Cleveland Orchestra. It was composed over the summer of 1995 and was first performed at Severance Hall, Cleveland on May 22, 1997, by the Cleveland Orchestra under the conductor Christoph von Dohnányi. The piece is dedicated to the orchestra and Oliver Knussen. "Allegro scorrevole" has a duration of approximately 11 minutes.

== Instrumentation ==
The Symphonia is scored for a large orchestra comprising three flutes (2nd and 3rd doubling piccolo), two oboes, cor anglais, two clarinets (2nd doubling E-flat clarinet), bass clarinet, two bassoons, contrabassoon, four horns, three trumpets, three trombones, tuba, timpani, four percussionists, harp, piano, and strings.

== Reception ==
The composition has been praised by critics and musicians alike. Reviewing the world premiere of "Partita," John von Rhein of the Chicago Tribune highly praised the first movement, writing:

Partita [...] vividly conveys that sense of flying over an ever-changing landscape. Carter's web of sounds and silences continuously shifts as one kind of music breaks in upon another, moves to the fore and then is pushed aside by another. As with many of his recent works, you feel time itself is moving forward at many different rates. But so refined is his workmanship that, despite the density of musical information at any given moment, everything sounds, everything tells. For most listeners it will require several hearings to be able to clear a path of understanding through this music, but Carter has made the effort rewarding. Partita attests to the extraordinary creative vitality of America's most famous living composer. In time, no doubt, his technical demands will be so second nature that the Chicago musicians will make more of the score's sportive qualities. But no one could fault their dedicated virtuosity, or the skill with which Barenboim put this musical Rubik's cube together.

The complete Symphonia has been similarly lauded by critics and has been regarded as one of Carter's best works. The cellist Fred Sherry (who performed the first recording of Carter's Cello Concerto) described the Symphonia: sum fluxae pretium spei as one of three Carter pieces he would "recommend to every music lover," including his Concerto for Orchestra and A Symphony of Three Orchestras. The music critic Paul Griffiths, who wrote the libretto for Carter's opera What Next?, declared the piece "a symphony beyond symphonies". Tom Service of The Guardian included the Symphonia among his list of the fifty greatest symphonies, writing:

What makes Symphonia so special is that the piece is pitched in a place "beyond" the conventional confines of the symphony, because of the scale and scope of what it's attempting, poetically, musically and structurally. It's music that winds up reconfiguring what a symphony might be at the end of the 20th century, by which time the form had been battered, bruised and contorted out of all recognition to its heroic phase in the late 19th century; and which does so, paradoxically, because it defies, ignores, or flat-out contradicts the conventions of symphonic discourse. That's an astonishing achievement for any composer to attempt, let alone one in the middle of their ninth decade.
