= A Symphony of Three Orchestras =

A Symphony of Three Orchestras is an orchestra composition by the American composer Elliott Carter. The work was commissioned by the New York Philharmonic through a grant from the National Endowment for the Arts. It was composed from June through December 1976 and was first performed in New York City on February 17, 1977, by the New York Philharmonic under the conductor Pierre Boulez. The composition is dedicated to Boulez and the New York Philharmonic.

== Composition ==
A Symphony of Three Orchestras has a duration of roughly 17 minutes and is composed in a single movement. The work was inspired by the beginning of Hart Crane's poem The Bridge as it describes New York Harbor and the Brooklyn Bridge.

=== Instrumentation ===
The work is scored for a large orchestra divided into three ensembles. The first ensemble comprises three horns, three trumpets, two trombones, bass trombone, tuba, timpani, and strings (7-8 desks of violins, 3-4 desks of violas, 2-3 desks of cellos, and 1-2 desks of basses). The second ensemble comprises two clarinets (doubling bass clarinet), E-flat clarinet, 2 percussionists (playing vibraphone, chimes, xylophone, marimba, long drum or tabor, and floor tom), piano and strings (2 desks of violins, 2-3 desks of cellos, and one desk of basses). The third ensemble comprises two flutes, piccolo, two oboes, cor anglais, two bassoons, contrabassoon, two horns, one percussionist (playing anvil, bell tree, 2 suspended cymbals, 2 snare drums, tambourine and 2 tam-tams), and strings (7-8 desks of violins, 3-4 desks of violas, and 1-2 desks of basses).

== Reception ==
The composition has been praised by musicians and critics alike. The cellist Fred Sherry (who performed the first recording of Carter's Cello Concerto) described A Symphony of Three Orchestras as one of three Carter pieces he would "recommend to every music lover," including his Concerto for Orchestra and Symphonia: sum fluxae pretium spei. The music critic Tim Page of The Washington Post wrote, "It makes its strongest impression in concert, where one may listen to each ensemble playing its own allotted music, then combining with the other ensembles to create a cumulative whole."
