= Symphony No. 5 (Zwilich) =

The Symphony No. 5 or Concerto for Orchestra is a composition for orchestra by the American composer Ellen Taaffe Zwilich. The work was commissioned by the Juilliard School in honor of Bruce Kovner and Suzie Kovner with support of the Trust of Francis Goelet. It was first performed by the Juilliard Orchestra conducted by James Conlon at Carnegie Hall on October 27, 2008.

== Composition ==
The symphony functions both as a traditional symphony and as a concerto for orchestra. Zwilich described her approach in the score program notes, remarking, "The entire work treats the orchestra like a huge chamber ensemble, in which each player or section can be a brilliant soloist one moment and a sensitive partner the next."

=== Structure ===
The symphony has a performance duration of approximately 24 minutes and is cast in four movements:

1. Prologue
2. Celebration
3. Memorial
4. Epilogue

The first movement "Prologue" introduces several themes used throughout the remainder of the symphony. The second movement "Celebration," the composer notes, was written "in celebration of the vibrant energy" of the Juilliard Symphony. The third movement "Memorial" was written "in remembrance of composers whose voices were silenced by tyranny."

=== Instrumentation ===
The work is scored for a large orchestra comprising piccolo, two flutes, two oboes, English horn, two clarinets, bass clarinet, two bassoons, contrabassoon, four horns, three trumpets, trombone, bass trombone, tuba, timpani, four percussionists, and strings.

== Reception ==
Reviewing the world premiere, Steve Smith of The New York Times wrote, "the symphony demonstrated Ms. Zwilich’s flair for orchestration. Focus restlessly shifted among sections, and from massed groups to isolated soloists. Unorthodox percussion instruments (like the spiral cymbal, a dangling, serpentine coil that offers a distant roar) and techniques (timpani played with a model of wire brush known as dreadlocks) showed that Ms. Zwilich keeps up with recent trends." He added, "Determining whether Ms. Zwilich’s Fifth Symphony is among her strongest creations would require more than a single hearing. But the qualities that have long made her music personal and compelling were certainly present, and the Juilliard musicians took up the piece with diligence and vitality."
