= El último sueño de Frida y Diego =

2022 opera by Gabriela Lena Frank

- Opera by Gabriela Lena Frank
- Librettist: Nilo Cruz
- Language: Spanish
- Premiere: October 29, 2022; San Diego Opera

El último sueño de Frida y Diego is an opera composed by Gabriela Lena Frank with a libretto by Nilo Cruz, depicting Frida Kahlo leaving the underworld on the Day of the Dead to reunite with her lover Diego Rivera.

It had its premiere at the San Diego Opera on October 29, 2022.

== Synopsis ==
Act 1

The opera takes place in 1957, three years after Frida Kahlo's death. Diego Rivera, nearing the end of his life, longs to see Frida once more. In the afterlife, Frida resides in the Land of the Dead, where the spirits of the deceased are permitted to visit the living world during Día de los Muertos.

Moved by Diego's grief and desire for reconciliation, the skeletal spirit Catrina—the ruler of the dead—grants Frida a special opportunity. Frida is allowed to return to the world of the living for a single day to reunite with Diego before he dies.

Act 2

As Frida journeys back, she encounters spirits from Mexico's artistic and cultural history, including the writer Leonardo da Vinci (reimagined as a guide and fellow artist) and various figures from Mexican folklore. The boundary between life and death becomes fluid as memories, dreams, and visions intermingle.

When Frida and Diego are reunited, they relive the joys and pains of their tumultuous relationship. They confront Diego's infidelities, Frida's suffering, their artistic ambitions, and the deep love that bound them together despite years of conflict. Through these encounters, both artists seek forgiveness and understanding.

As the day draws to a close, Frida must return to the Land of the Dead. Diego finally accepts his approaching death, comforted by their reunion and by the knowledge that their love and artistic legacies will endure. The opera ends with a sense of reconciliation, as the lovers prepare to be united once more beyond the mortal world.

== Critical reception ==
The opera has received a generally positive critical reception since its 2023 world premiere and especially following its 2026 presentation at the Metropolitan Opera. Critics have praised its visual imagination, emotional accessibility, and celebration of Mexican culture, while some have expressed reservations about aspects of the libretto and musical characterization.

Some reviewers have singled out the opera's visual world as its greatest achievement. Productions inspired by the artwork of Frida Kahlo and Diego Rivera were frequently described as colorful, imaginative, and theatrical. Critics noted that the combination of Day of the Dead imagery, dance, costumes, and magical realism created a highly engaging stage experience.

OperaScorecard, which aggregates professional reviews, classified the reception as "Recommended" with an overall score of 76/100, reflecting mostly positive notices.

== Performance history ==
- San Diego Opera, 2022, world premiere
- San Francisco Opera, 2023
- Metropolitan Opera, 2026
- Lyric Opera of Chicago, 2026
- Seattle Opera, 2027
