= Boston Concerto =

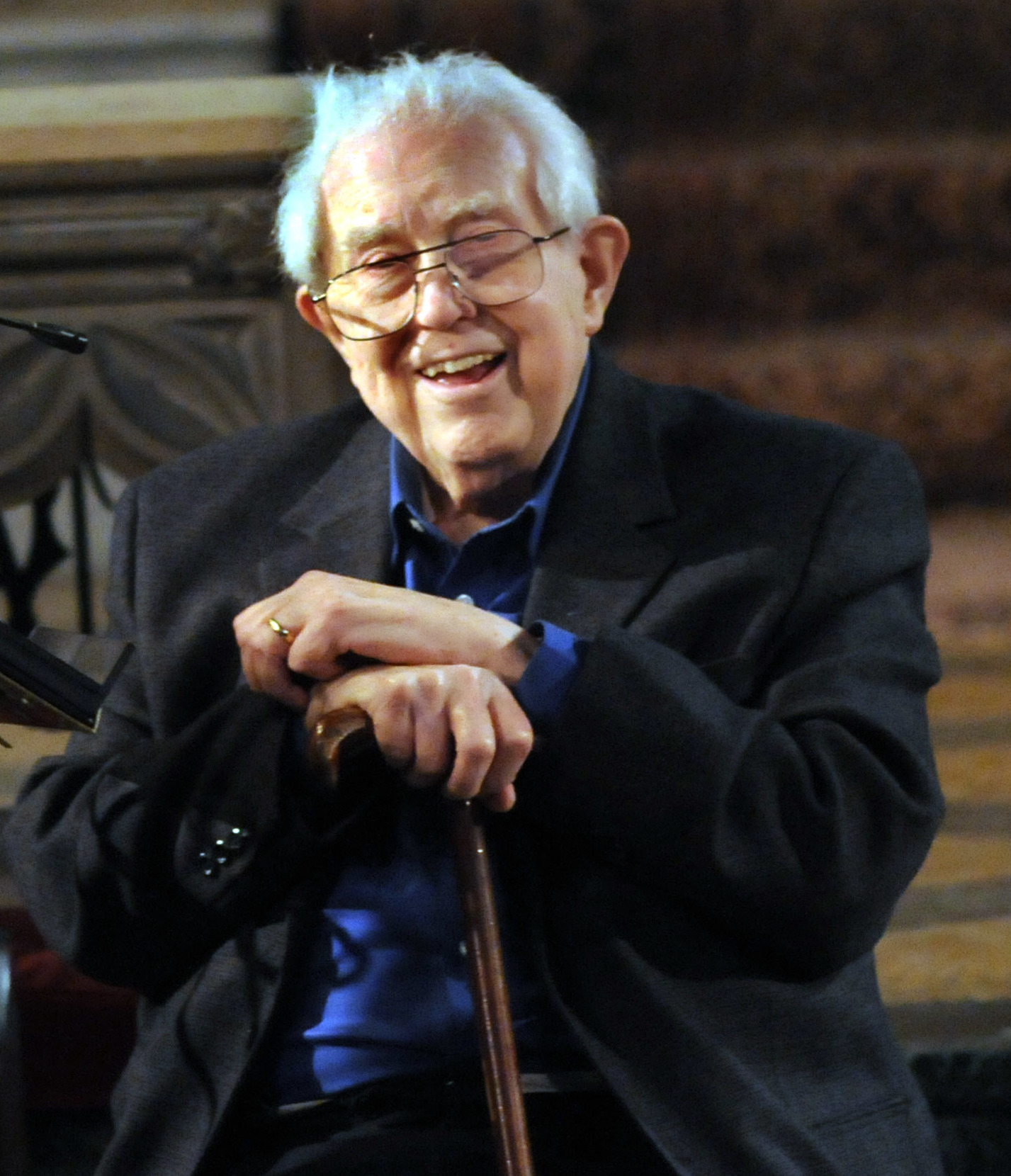
Elliott Carter in 2007

The Boston Concerto is a concerto for orchestra by the American composer Elliott Carter. The work was commissioned by the Boston Symphony Orchestra, for which the piece is titled. It was first performed in Symphony Hall, Boston, on April 3, 2003, by the Boston Symphony Orchestra under the conductor Ingo Metzmacher. Carter dedicated the concerto to his wife Helen Jones Carter, who died on May 17, 2003.

== Composition ==
The Boston Concerto has a duration of roughly 19 minutes and is composed in thirteen connected movements:

1. Allegro staccatissimo
2. Lento, teneramente
3. Tempo primo
4. Meno mosso
5. Piu mosso, tempo primo
6. Meno mosso
7. Tempo primo
8. Lento, sostenuto
9. Tempo primo
10. Piu mosso
11. Tempo primo
12. Maestoso - molto espressivo
13. Tempo primo

=== Instrumentation ===
The work is scored for an orchestra comprising three flutes (2nd and 3rd doubling piccolo), two oboes, cor anglais, three clarinets (3rd doubling bass clarinet), three bassoons (3rd doubling contrabassoon), four horns, three trumpets, three trombones, tuba, three percussionists, harp, piano, and strings.

== Reception ==
The Boston Concerto has been praised by music critics. Kate Molleson of The Guardian declared it "a piece of gorgeous orchestral colour." She added, "Sections of the ensemble glint and fade; melodic snippets gurgle to the surface and an exquisite finespun mesh holds it all together." K. Smith of Gramophone suggested the piece confirmed a change in Carter's composition style, writing, "It might be too much of a stretch to blame this new-found clarity on the composer writing his first opera in 1999 (at the age of 90!) but clearly Carter has started letting his musical ideas sing as well as shout."
