= Altar de Cuerda =

Violin concerto by Gabriela Ortiz

Altar de Cuerda (String Altar) is a violin concerto written between September and December 2021 by the Mexican composer Gabriela Ortiz. The work was commissioned by the Los Angeles Philharmonic for the violinist María Dueñas, to whom the piece is dedicated. Its world premiere was given by María Dueñas and the Los Angeles Philharmonic conducted by Gustavo Dudamel at the Walt Disney Concert Hall on May 14, 2022. Altar de Cuerda is the seventh composition in Ortiz's Altares series, following Altar de Neón (1995), Altar de Muertos (1997), Altar de Piedra (2002), Altar de Fuego (2010), Altar de Luz (2013), and Altar de Viento (2015).

== Composition ==
Altar de Cuerda has a duration of about 28 minutes and is cast in three movements:

1. "Morisco chilango" ("Chilango Moorish")
2. "Canto abierto" ("Open Song")
3. "Maya déco"

The title of the first movement refers to Ortiz's Mexico City background (where "chilango" is a slang term used to denote its residents) and Dueñas's Andalusian background; the composer thus combined elements of Latin American and Mediterranean musical styles. The second movement "Open Song" refers to the open chapels (known as "capilla abiertas") that were a distinctive feature of Mexican churches built in the 16th century. The third movement "Maya déco" abstractly refers to Maya architecture and its later influences and features a prominent cadenza for the soloist.

=== Instrumentation ===
The work is scored for solo violin and an orchestra consisting of a piccolo, two flutes, two oboes, two clarinets, two bassoons, four horns, three trumpets, two trombones, bass trombone, timpani, three percussionists, harp, piano (doubling celesta), and strings. Additionally, all wind instruments double playing wine glasses.

== Reception ==
Reviewing the world premiere, Mark Swed of the Los Angeles Times praised Altar de Cuerda, saying that it begins "in a state of shimmering strings, but is cut through with startlingly sharp percussive attacks and exciting rhythmic action of a city coming to life." He continued, "The beautiful, bass-heavy central movement, 'Canto Abierto' (Open Song), conjures a mystical atmosphere of early Mexican churches. A bass drum booms, deep strings give mildewy cushion and timpani glide down as if to the center of the Earth. Wind instruments are the wind. The glistening solo violin does the singing. A final chord in the orchestra sounds electrically charged. 'Maya Déco,' a bravura Mayan decoration with a dazzling cadenza, became a showpiece for Dueñas." Oussama Zahr of The New York Times similarly described the piece as a "blazing violin concerto" that "set a high bar," adding, "It begins with a scorching statement in the violin, with whacks of triangle and crotales (spooky sounding cymbals) that rise off the stage like puffs of smoke in a roiling brew. At a few points, the woodwind and brass musicians played tuned crystal cups that conjured ritualistic magic."

Charlize Althea Garcia of The Poly Post was slightly more critical of the work, however, writing, "Although [Dueñas's] expertism was showcased, the spotlight might have been too overbearing, burying the piece with runs on end. The melodies were of ghost-like movements that jumped inconsistently throughout the piece; both silence and melody were spasmodic. The orchestra and the violinist felt as if they had not complemented each other but acted as equal counterparts that contributed to the same conversation; the orchestra did not seem to support the violinist but challenge her."
