= Spira (concerto) =

Orchestral work by Unsuk Chin

SPIRA—Concerto for Orchestra is an orchestral composition written in 2019 by the South Korean composer Unsuk Chin. It was commissioned by the Los Angeles Philharmonic, which gave the piece its world premiere under the direction of Mirga Gražinytė-Tyla at the Walt Disney Concert Hall on 5 April 2019.

== Composition ==
Spira is cast in one continuous movement and lasts about 19 minutes. The title of the piece comes from the self-similar spiral curve known as a logarithmic spiral, which was nicknamed Spira mirabilis ("the marvelous spiral") by the 17th-century mathematician Jacob Bernoulli. Unsuk Chin was inspired to write a concerto for orchestra following a decade-long relationship with the Los Angeles Philharmonic, which she described as "among the most inspiring ones." In the score program note, she wrote, "What fascinates me about this chameleonic 'genre' is not only that it challenges musicians to peaks of virtuosity but especially that it can coax unprecedented textures, sonorities, and forms from the symphony orchestra. The orchestra can be presented as one entity, a 'super-orchestra', but also in various chamber-like combinations, and one can also highlight a certain section or even single musicians as soloists."

The piece prominently features the use of a pair of vibraphones placed spatially apart, with an additional musician controlling each instruments' resonance. The composer added:

The resonance of the two vibraphones runs through the whole work as a kind of 'halo', but it constantly varies in detail, which results in complex interferences and changing rhythmic patterns. At some point, this concept is taken over by the string section in a magnified guise, fluctuating between consonant harmony and extreme tone clusters. This simple idea forms the basis of the work whose structure grows from the conflict and interaction between the underlying ‘ur-cell’ and the reactions of other groups of instruments, with the music constantly changing in terms of density, color, character, and pulse, shifting between chaos and order, activity and repose.

=== Instrumentation ===
The work is scored for a large orchestra comprising three flutes (2nd doubling alto flute; 3rd doubling piccolo), three oboes (3rd doubling English horn), four clarinets (2nd doubling E-flat clarinet), three bassoons (3rd doubling contrabassoon), six horns, four trumpets, four trombones, tuba, timpani, four or five percussionists (playing two vibraphones, washboard, guiro, triangle, chimes, flextone, two metal blocks, crotales, three suspended cymbals, snare drums, bass marimba, xylophone, splash cymbal, three tam-tams, crash cymbals, tambourine, glockenspiel, bass drum, thunder sheet), harp, piano (doubling celesta), and strings.

== Reception ==
Reviewing the world premiere, Mark Swed of the Los Angeles Times praised the piece, remarking that it "takes its sound world from a pair of bowed vibraphones spreading overtones all over the place, so they can be picked up by strings and winds and brass and bloom springlike into ever-expanding bouquet of glittery vibration." Andrew Clements of The Guardian similarly wrote, "Despite the hyperactivity and complexity of the scoring, the full orchestral forces are used sparingly; the overriding impression is of glittering transparency, and of tracing a totally sure-footed harmonic path from beginning to end." Rebecca Franks of The Times also praised the piece, writing that Unsuk Chin "allows the music to unfurl and curl in a riot of ricocheting, shimmering, explosive, glittering detail." She continued, "Chin's command of the orchestral palette is incredible and, as if looking at a slide under a microscope, the more closely you listened, the more there was to discover. I almost wished they had played Spira twice, there was so much to take in."
