= Yanga (composition) =

Orchestral work by Gabriela Ortiz

Yanga is a composition for choir, percussion quartet, and orchestra written in 2019 by the Mexican composer Gabriela Ortiz with a text by Santiago Martin Bermúdez. The work was commissioned by the Los Angeles Philharmonic for the ensemble's centennial celebrations. Its world premiere was given by the Tambuco Percussion Ensemble, the Los Angeles Master Chorale, and the Los Angeles Philharmonic conducted by Gustavo Dudamel at the Walt Disney Concert Hall on October 27, 2019. The work won two awards at the 2026 Grammys.

== Composition ==
Yanga is written in one continuous movement divided into four sections and lasts about 17 minutes in performance.

=== Background ===
The piece was inspired by the African revolutionary Gaspar Yanga, who led a maroon colony of enslaved Africans in the highlands near Veracruz, Mexico (then New Spain) during the early period of Spanish colonial rule. It was originally conceived as an opera for the Festival del Centro Histórico and its director Sergio Vela—a project that has been unable to materialize due to financial restrictions. Bermúdez adapted a shorter poem from his original libretto, however, which became the main text for Yanga in addition to texts inspired by texts of Congo origin.

In the score program note, Ortiz wrote, "One of the most important features of the work is the use of African instruments that arrived in Latin America such as the batás, guiros, shekeres, cabasas, among others. My idea was to add the unique color of these instruments into a musical discourse from my imaginary sound world without trying to directly emulate Afro-Latin American rhythms. The choir is often used rhythmically, creating various polyphonic textures and thus dialoguing with the solo percussion parts and the orchestra." She added, "To me Yanga is a work of an immense expressive force that speaks of the greatness of humanity when in search of equality and the universal right to enjoy freedom to the fullest."

=== Instrumentation ===
The work is scored for solo percussion quartet, mixed choir, and an orchestra comprising piccolo, two flutes, two oboes, two clarinets, two bassoons, four horns, three trumpets, two trombones, bass trombone, tuba, timpani (doubling crotales), two additional percussionists, and strings.

== Reception ==
Reviewing the world premiere, Mark Swed of the Los Angeles Times praised Yanga, writing, "Ortiz has a slow, atmospheric and harmonically arresting introduction, though a brief one, before her rhythmically compelling evocation of Yanga, an operatic hero if there ever was one. I hope Ortiz, who does seem to have an opera in her, actually writes one." Richard S. Ginell of the San Francisco Classical Voice similarly described it as a "terrific new piece further advances the promise of a dynamic, vital fusion of Latin American and European music."

Reviewing a later performance, Tim Diovanni of The Dallas Morning News also praised the piece, remarking, "In one movement over 17 minutes, the music features energetic Latin rhythms, with prominent brass and percussion. The percussion quartet whips up a storm with a battery of African instruments, pounding hand drums, striking wooden sticks and making both scratchy and shaking sounds with dried gourds. The chorus often interlocks rhythmically with the percussion and orchestra, but also shares reflective passages, where brightly layered chords are darkened by close-wrought dissonances."

At the 2026 Grammys, Yanga won the awards for Best Choral Performance and for Best Classical Compendium.
