= Clara (composition) =

Orchestral work by Gabriela Ortiz

Clara is an orchestral composition written in 2021 by the Mexican composer Gabriela Ortiz. The work was commissioned by the New York Philharmonic, which first performed the piece under the conductor Gustavo Dudamel at Alice Tully Hall on March 9, 2022.

== Composition ==
=== Background ===
Clara was inspired by the Romantic-era German pianist and composer Clara Schumann and her relationship with her husband and fellow composer Robert Schumann. In the score program note, Ortiz wrote, "My original idea was to transfer onto an ephemeral canvas the internal sounds of each one without attempting to illustrate or interpret, but simply voice and create, through my ear, the expressiveness and unique strength of their complex, but also fascinating personalities." She added:

Clara parts from the idea that music will grant us access to a non-linear conception of time that is more circular, where the past (them) and the present (me) can meet, converse, and get to know one another. During these imaginary dialogues of a poetic and musical nature, an intimate diary began to grow in me filled with nuances, confessions, and internal contradictions that find in music their own reference, significance, and internal coherence, expressing all that which cannot be read or explained, but rather must be heard.

=== Structure ===
Clara is cast in a single movement divided into five sections played continuously, each representing an imagined interaction between Clara and Robert Schumann or, as in the third section, Ortiz herself:

1. Clara
2. Robert
3. My response
4. Robert's subconscious
5. Always Clara

=== Instrumentation ===
The work is scored for an orchestra comprising two flutes (2nd doubling piccolo and alto flute), two oboes, two clarinets, two bassoons, four horns, three trumpets, two trombones, bass trombone, timpani (doubling gong), two percussionists, and strings.

== Reception ==
Clara has been praised by music critics. Reviewing the world premiere, Zachary Woolfe of The New York Times wrote, "Opening with a series of lingering chords, a kind of tolling ensemble bell, Clara is most memorable in long stretches of suspended eeriness, an apt evocation of floating between eras and continents, with the oboe making a melancholy keen." He continued, "Recalling Holst and mid-20th-century film scores in its lush colors and noirish dissonances, the piece has at its center a raucous movement recalling Ortiz's Mexican heritage and her modern sound world. [...] That driving vibrancy then recedes, in quiet music gently perforated with a pricking constellation of high-pitched percussion. In the final moments, wind instruments are tonelessly blown through, conjuring the sigh of history itself." George Grella of the New York Classical Review also praised the piece, remarking, "The skill and imagination in the music were continuously impressive—as soon as one felt there had been a natural ending, a new idea came along and brought the listener further. In a season that has been full of excellent new orchestral pieces, Ortiz's Clara stood out as both the most complex and the most exciting."
