= Itamar Golan =

Itamar Golan (Hebrew: איתמר גולן; born 3 August 1970) is an Israeli pianist.

Born in Vilnius, Lithuania, Golan emigrated to Israel with his parents at the age of one. He studied piano with Lara Vodovoz and Emmanuel Krazovsky and gave his first recital at the age of seven.

== Education ==
From 1985 to 1989, a scholarship from the America-Israel Cultural Foundation allowed Golan to continue his training in the United States at the New England Conservatory in Boston with Leonard Shure and Patricia Zander. He later studied chamber music with Chaim Taub.

== Career ==
Mendelssohn's Violin Sonata (No. 3) in F major, MWV Q 26 - I. Allegro vivace
Golan performing with violinist Jinjoo Cho in December 2019

Golan began his career as a soloist and chamber musician in the United States and Israel. He has performed live or on recordings with many musicians including Kyung Wha Chung, Janine Jansen, Barbara Hendricks, Maxim Vengerov, Shlomo Mintz, Mischa Maisky, Matt Haimovitz, Tabea Zimmermann, Ida Haendel, Julian Rachlin, and María Dueñas. Golan has performed in concert halls and festivals in or at Ravinia, Chicago, Tanglewood, Salzburg, Edinburgh, Verbier and Lucerne. He has also performed as a soloist with the Israel Philharmonic Orchestra and with the Berlin Philharmonic under the direction of Zubin Mehta.

From 1991 to 1994, Golan taught at the Manhattan School of Music in New York and is currently professor of chamber music at the Paris Conservatory.
