= Walkabout: Concerto for Orchestra =

Orchestral work by Gabriela Lena Frank

- by Gabriela Lena Frank
- Genre: Orchestral
- Form: Concerto for orchestra
- Composed: 2016
- Duration: ~30 minutes
- Movements: 4

Walkabout: Concerto for Orchestra is an orchestral composition written in 2016 by the American composer Gabriela Lena Frank. The work was commissioned by the Detroit Symphony Orchestra, where Frank was serving as composer-in-residence. Its world premiere was given by the Detroit Symphony Orchestra conducted by Michelle Merrill at Orchestra Hall, Detroit, on February 17, 2017.

== Composition ==
Walkabout has a duration of roughly 30 minutes and is cast in four movements:

1. Soliloquio Serrano
2. Huaracas
3. Haillí
4. Tarqueada

The work was inspired by Frank's travels in Peru, her mother's homeland. In the score program note, the composer wrote, "Born in the States, I did not begin these fateful trips until my time as a graduate student at the University of Michigan where my teachers encouraged me to answer questions of identity that long persisted for me: What does it mean to be American born yet with such a motley crew of forbearers hailing from Lithuania, China, and Andean South America? For more than twenty years, I've been answering this question, with each piece raising yet more to address."

The music thus contains several references to Peruvian culture. The first movement "Soliloquio Serrano" serves as a "mountain soliloquy" to the Andes; the second movement "Huaracas" refers to the eponymous slingshot weapons used by the Incas during the 16th century; the third movement "Haillí" is the Quechua word for "prayer;" and the final movement "Tarqueada" refers to a traditional Peruvian parade involving numerous "tarka" flutists.

=== Instrumentation ===
The work is scored for a large orchestra consisting of three flutes (3rd doubling piccolo), two oboes, Cor anglais, three clarinets (2nd doubling E-flat clarinet; 3rd doubling bass clarinet), three bassoons, two horns, three trumpets, two trombone, timpani, three percussionists, piano, harp, and strings.

== Reception ==
Reviewing the world premiere, Colin Anderson of Classical Source gave the piece a fairly mixed review. He wrote:

folksy/jazzy on solo strings, supported by ominous timpani, the rhythms are strong, the expression evocative and engaging. The second movement is faster, wilder, with many more instruments (including harp, piano and percussion) involved, the patterns intricate. The next section luxuriates in slowness and lush writing for strings, more moody than motif-conscious (reminding of Bernard Herrmann’s music for Hitchcock’s Psycho) and growing in disruption, and the discursive final movement becomes increasingly festive (in the manner of Revueltas), police-whistle, or something like it, over-used, until coming to rest. Yet, however intriguing the sounds, and with no doubt as to the virtuosity of the DSO's commitment and the expertise of the conducting, each movement, although relatively short (the whole plays for thirty minutes), outstayed its welcome, the last two especially.

After its premiere in 2017, subsequent reviews have been unanimously favorable. Reviews for its May, 2023 performances, the Philadelphia Orchestra under the baton of Yannick Nezét-Seguin, where Frank served as composer-in-residence, include a review from Cameron Kelsall of BachTrack, who writes,

Frank’s work exists at a crossroad of identity, and her intersectionality manifests not only in the style of her music but also in her manner of composition. Subtitled as a concerto for orchestra, Walkabout brings together all corners of the symphony to create something that sounds at once familiar and foreign, comforting and jarring. The first movement opens with spirited Klezmer figures in the first and second violins, representing Frank's Jewish heritage, punctuated occasionally by the thunderclap of cymbals. She is finding a way to bring together the disparate but vital truth of her experience.

In the second movement, the music travels noticeably to South America, with the orchestra evoking indigenous instruments. There is a quiet elegance to the third movement, Haillí, which we are told means “prayer”, and a rising intensity to the concluding Tarqueada, where woodwinds swarm the stage like bees. Blown whistles snap the audience to attention near the end. Nézet-Séguin brought narrative focus to this all-encompassing concerto while still allowing the players to let loose in the right moments.

Linda Holt of the Broad Street Review also praised the work as performed by the Philadelphia Orchestra:

But first to an exciting newer work: American composer Gabriela Lena Frank’s 2016 Walkabout: Concerto for Orchestra, in its first complete performance by the Philadelphia Orchestra. Scored for a large ensemble, the richly modulated score features a dozen percussion instruments, including bass drum, cymbals, timpani, police whistle, tam-tam, and slapstick. Currently the orchestra’s composer-in-residence, Frank reveals her comprehensive understanding of the symphonic forces at her command in four riveting movements. These sections unfold, each with a unique, thought-provoking character, as she journeys to and from countries associated with her multicultural heritage (Peruvian, Chinese, Lithuanian-Jewish). Frank can also add disability to her perspective: she was diagnosed with moderate-to-profound hearing loss at birth.

Bold, complex, passionate: After an introduction by speaker Charlotte Blake Alston, the first movement, “Soliloquio Serrano” (“Mountain Soliloquy”), opened in a whisper with concertmaster David Kim’s lyrical solo. He was soon joined by the other first chairs as a string quartet which played along with, and sometimes in counterpoint to, the orchestra. As the work unfolded, timpani thunder, displaying their muscular power, and glissandi (sliding notes) were passed from musician to musician.

A contrasting wave of agitation crashed through the second movement, “Huaracas” (slingshot weapons of the 16th-century Incan empire), while a prayer (“Haillí”) rose up from the string section in movement three, later to be joined by other instruments in an animated conversation. “Tarqueada”, Frank's recollection of a parade of flutists in Peru, completes the concerto with a potpourri of percussive flaunts. My only criticism is that I found the police whistle too loud and piercing in this section and would lobby for a slightly more subdued sound that would still carry the musical point.

Overall, I found this work revelatory, authentic, and well-balanced. It was wonderful to hear a long (30-minute) work by a living woman composer of diverse heritage. So often, music directors will toss this demographic a musical bone by performing an overture-type composition in five minutes or so. This work reminded me of Bartók’s Concerto for Orchestra for its bold expression, complexity, and passion for the music of Indigenous cultures.

In reviewing a performance by the Tanglewood Music Center Orchestra in August 2023, Joseph Dalton writes:

The second half of the program was devoted to Gabriela Lena Frank’s “Walkabout: Concerto for Orchestra,” which was powerful, always engaging and expertly crafted. Frank, who lives in northern California, juggles many projects and associations, among them being composer in residence with the Philadelphia Orchestra. Last August at SPAC, the Philly was joined by Albany Pro Musica to perform an inscrutable piece that Frank composed as a prelude to Beethoven's Ninth Symphony. More recently, Frank has received glowing reviews for her first opera, “El Último Sueño de Frida y Diego,” about the Mexican artists Frida Kahlo and Diego Rivera that debuted in June at the San Francisco Opera.

I was ready to be impressed by something from this increasingly prominent composer and her 35-minute Concerto for Orchestra earned its place as the capstone to this year’s Festival of Contemporary Music. In the final two movements, which were played with only the slightest pause in between, the orchestration was powerful and robust, yet the propulsive structure had a noticeable transparency. It’s like you could see the sonic architecture in motion especially in the powerful writing for brass.

Something seemed to be at stake in the music as the tension kept getting amped up, usually initiated by the strings and driven by the percussion section, which was large but not overpowering. Sometimes the textures thinned to such a point that you could hear one player tapping on wood. The rhythmic lines usually had a slight taste of Latin culture, a reflection of the composer’s mixed heritage that includes Peruvian ancestors.

The Atlanta Symphony Orchestra is slated to perform Walkabout: Concerto for orchestra in its 2023–24 season on April 25–26, 2024 under the baton of Lina Gonzalez-Granados.
