= María Dueñas (violinist) =

Spanish violinist (born 2002)

María Dueñas Fernández
- Born: 4 December 2002 (age 23); Granada, Spain
- Genre: Classical
- Occupation: Musician • Composer
- Instruments: Violin, Piano
- Years active: 2017-present
- Label: Deutsche Grammophon
- Website: www.mariaduenasviolin.com/en

María Dueñas Fernández (born 4 December 2002), is a Spanish violinist and composer. In 2021 she won the first prize in the Yehudi Menuhin Competition, in the Senior Division. She is considered the Spanish violinist with the greatest international profile. In 2022, she signed an exclusive contract with Deutsche Grammophon.

== Early life and education ==
María Dueñas Fernández was born in 2002 in Granada, Spain, in a family in which there are no professional musicians, but who encouraged her musical training, as she attended concerts from an early age.

She started playing violin at age seven and enrolled at the Ángel Barrios Conservatory in her native Granada a year later. At the age of 11, she won a scholarship from the Juventudes Musicales de Madrid, allowing her to study at the Carl Maria von Weber College of Music in Dresden. On the recommendation of violinist and conductor Vladimir Spivakov, she then moved to Vienna to study with Boris Kuschnir, and enrolled at the University of Music and Dramatic Art in Vienna and at the University of Graz.

María has two sisters who are also musicians. Her sister Julia Dueñas plays violin and her sister Daniela Dueñas plays cello.

== Musical career ==
Dueñas has been a soloist with European and American orchestras, such as the San Francisco Symphony, the Luxembourg Philharmonic Orchestra, and the Spanish National Orchestra. In September 2019, Dueñas was designated as the New Artist of the Month by the magazine Musical America, which is the oldest American magazine on classical music. Dueñas is also the founder of the Hamamelis Quartet.

She won the 1st prize at the 2021 Getting to Carnegie Hall competition, for which each participant performed the world premiere of one movement of Julian Gargiulo’s new sonata for violin and piano. In 2021, at the age of 18, Dueñas won the 1st prize and the Audience Prize in the Senior Division at the Menuhin Competition. For the final round of the competition, Dueñas played Lutosławski's Subito, Mozart's Violin Concerto No. 4 in D Major, and Lalo's Symphonie Espagnole in D minor. The award includes $20,000 and a 2-year loan of a golden period Stradivarius violin. In 2023 she won the Luitpold Prize of the festival Kissinger Sommer.

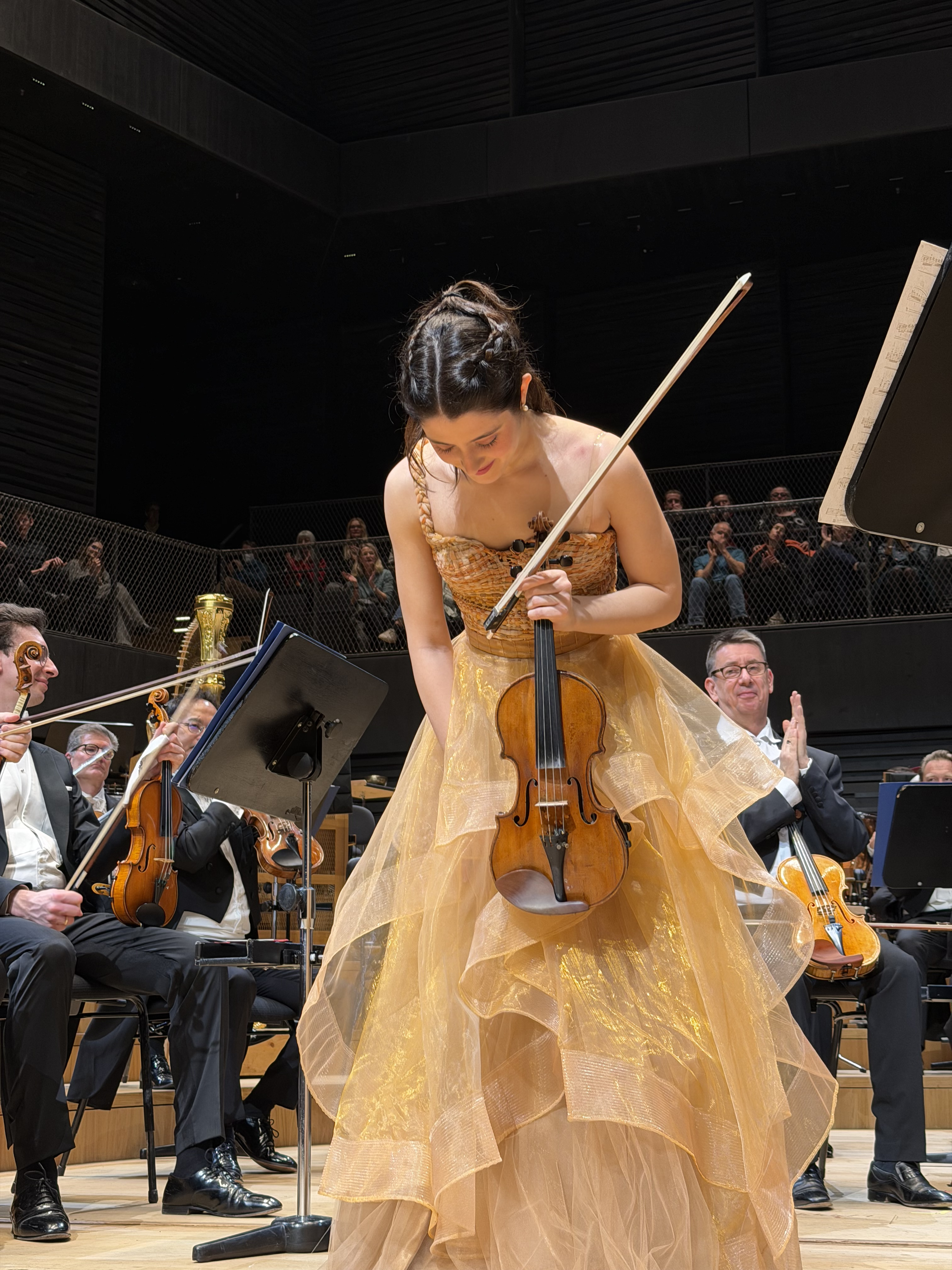
Dueñas in 2025

Other competitions she has competed in include the 1st Leonid Kogan International Competition for Young Violinists (1st Prize, 3rd Category) and the 2nd Zhuhai International Mozart Competition for Young Musicians (1st Prize, Violin Group B) in 2017, the 4th Yankelevitch International Violin Competition (1st Prize, Senior Division) and the 2nd Vladimir Spivakov International Violin Competition (1st Prize) in 2018, the Montreal International Musical Competition Violin Edition in 2019, and the 2nd Viktor Tretyakov International Violin Competition (Grand Prize) in 2021.

== Instruments ==
As a stipendiary of the Deutsche Stiftung Musikleben, María Dueñas plays a Nicolò Gagliano violin (17?4 uncertain date) and the Stradivarius "Camposelice" (1710), on loan from the Nippon Music Foundation since 2022. From 2019 to 2022, María played the Guarneri del Gesù "Muntz" (1736), also on loan from the same foundation.

== Influences ==
Dueñas grew up around classical music influenced by recordings of violinists such as Yehudi Menuhin, David Oistrakh, and Jascha Heifetz. Her fascination with their distinctive sounds inspires her to work on her own. In an interview with Katherine Cooper from Presto Music in Dueñas' home in Vienna, she states about her influences:

Hearing recordings of Heifetz and Oistrakh when I was very young had a profound impact on me, because I could recognise the sound of those people instantly. Nowadays a lot of the time when you listen to recordings you can’t tell who’s playing - but when you hear Oistrakh you know who it is right away, and that’s something I would love to achieve myself. I spend a lot of time working on finding my own distinctive sound, and I dream of people playing a recording in the years to come and thinking ‘Ah, that’s María Dueñas!’.

== Composing career ==
Dueñas first developed an interest in composing when she composed her own cadenza for Mozart's Violin Concerto No. 1. She also proceeded to write cadenzas for Mozart's other Violin Concertos as well.

Dueñas plays the piano on occasion and through this developed an interest in experimenting with different harmonies. This eventually resulted in her composing the piece “Farewell” when she was 13, which was awarded the Robert Schumann International Piano Competition award in 2016. In 2020 with production by Alexander Houben and performance from pianist Evgeny Sinaiski, her piece later premiered as a music video.

She has made arrangements of string trios that she plays with her sisters, stating in an interview with Laurie Niles, founder and editor of violinist.com:

There are a lot of pieces for a string trio, or a trio with piano, but not for two violins and cello, so l arranged pieces, or wrote an extra cello part for a piece. We all love to play together.

== Discography ==
=== Albums ===
| Title | Artists | Composers | Release Date | Label |
|---|---|---|---|---|
| Beethoven and Beyond* | María Dueñas, Volker Kempf, Manfred Honeck, Wiener Symphoniker | Louis Spohr, Ludwig van Beethoven, Eugène Ysaÿe, Camille Saint-Saëns, Henryk Wieniawski, Fritz Kreisler | 5 May 2023 | Deutsche Grammophon |
| Paganini: 24 Caprices - Caprices by Berlioz, Cervelló, Kreisler, Ortiz, Saint-Saëns, Sarasate, Wieniawski | María Dueñas, Itamar Golan, Raphaël Feuillâtre, Boris Kuschnir, Alexander Malofeev, Deutsches Symphonie-Orchester Berlin | Niccolò Paganini, Pablo de Sarasate, Fritz Kreisler, Jordi Cervelló, Henryk Wieniawski, Gabriela Ortiz, Camille Saint-Saëns, Hector Berlioz | 14 February 2025 | Deutsche Grammophon |
| Homage to Heifetz | María Dueñas, Gustavo Dudamel, Simón Bolívar Symphony Orchestra of Venezuela | Édouard Lalo, Erich Wolfgang Korngold, Claude Debussy, Manuel Ponce | 28 August 2026 | Deutsche Grammophon |

* Versions of Beethoven's Violin Concerto from Beethoven and Beyond were released as an additional 5 albums from May through July 2023 with each of them having First Movement Cadenzas written by Louis Spohr (12 May 2023), Eugène Ysaÿe (2 June 2023), Camille Saint-Saëns (16 June 2023), Henryk Wieniawski (30 June 2023), and Fritz Kreisler (14 July 2023). The Second and Third Movement Cadenzas are written by María in these 5 albums.

=== Singles and EPs ===
| Title | Artist(s) | Release Date | Label |
|---|---|---|---|
| Fauré: 3 Songs, Op. 7: I. Après un rêve (Version for Violin and Piano) | María Dueñas, Itamar Golan, Gabriel Fauré | 30 September 2022 | Deutsche Grammophon |
| Lalo: 2 Impromptus, Op. 4: I. Espérance | María Dueñas, Itamar Golan, Édouard Lalo | 27 January 2023 | Deutsche Grammophon |
| Ysaÿe: Berceuse, Op. 20 | María Dueñas, Manfred Honeck, Wiener Symphoniker, Eugène Ysaÿe | 24 March 2023 | Deutsche Grammophon |
| Beethoven: Violin Concerto in D Major, Op. 61: II. Larghetto (Cadenza: Dueñas) | María Dueñas, Manfred Honeck, Wiener Symphoniker, Ludwig van Beethoven | 7 April 2023 | Deutsche Grammophon |
| Spohr: Symphonie Concertante for Violin, Harp and Orchestra in G Major, WoO 13: II. Adagio | María Dueñas, Volker Kempf, Manfred Honeck, Wiener Symphoniker, Louis Spohr | 21 April 2023 | Deutsche Grammophon |
| Piazzolla: María De Buenos Aires: Yo soy María | María Dueñas, Itamar Golan, Astor Piazzolla | 21 July 2023 | Deutsche Grammophon |
| Dueñas: Homage 1770 | María Dueñas | 11 August 2023 | Deutsche Grammophon |
| Vivaldi: The Four Seasons / Violin Concerto in G Minor, RV 315 "Summer": III. Presto (Musical Moments) | María Dueñas, "Blue Orchestra" Special String Orchestra, Antonio Vivaldi | 15 September 2023 | Deutsche Grammophon |
| Gargiulo: Estro | María Dueñas, Julian Lawrence Gargiulo | 12 January 2024 | Deutsche Grammophon |
| Traditional: El cant dels ocells (Arr. Dueñas for Violin and Piano) | María Dueñas, Itamar Golan, Traditional | 26 January 2024 | Deutsche Grammophon |
| Ortiz: Altar de Cuerda | María Dueñas, Gustavo Dudamel, Los Angeles Philharmonic, Gabriela Ortiz | 10 May 2024 | Los Angeles Philharmonic |
| Gargiulo: Sonata No. 4 for Violin and Piano "From the Window" | María Dueñas, Julian Lawrence Gargiulo | 26 July 2024 | Deutsche Grammophon |
| Kreisler: Liebesleid, Old Viennese Dance No. 2 (Arr. Fougeray for Violin and Guitar) | María Dueñas, Raphaël Feuillâtre, Fritz Kreisler | 16 August 2024 | Deutsche Grammophon |
| Kreisler: Caprice viennois, Op. 2 (Arr. Fougeray for Violin and Guitar) | María Dueñas, Raphaël Feuillâtre, Fritz Kreisler | 11 October 2024 | Deutsche Grammophon |
| Paganini: 24 Caprices for Solo Violin, Op. 1, MS 25: No. 24 in A Minor. Tema con variazioni. Quasi presto | María Dueñas, Niccolò Paganini | 8 November 2024 | Deutsche Grammophon |
| Paganini: 24 Caprices for Solo Violin, Op. 1, MS 25: No. 9 in E Major "La chasse". Allegretto | María Dueñas, Niccolò Paganini | 17 January 2025 | Deutsche Grammophon |

== Sources ==
- Baliñas, Maxura (2020-03-24). "María Dueñas, seleccionada para el Concurso Menuhin" [María Dueñas, selected for the Menuhin Competition]. Mundoclasico.com.
- Deutsche Grammophon (2022-08-30). "Deutsche Grammophon Signs Menuhin Competition-Winner María Dueñas". Deutsche Grammophon.
- Rosado, Candela Martínez (2020-06-23). "No sólo escucho música clásica; soy muy curiosa y me interesa todo tipo de géneros" [I don't just listen to classical music; I'm very curious and interested in all kinds of genres.]. Granada Hoy.
