= Hominum =

Composition by Gabriela Ortiz

Hominum—Concerto for Orchestra is a concerto for orchestra written in 2016 by the Mexican composer Gabriela Ortiz. The work was commissioned by the Instituto Nacional de Bellas Artes, the Orquesta Sinfónica Nacional de México and its artistic director Carlos Miguel Prieto, to whom the piece is dedicated in celebration of the 100th anniversary of the Constitution of Mexico. Its world premiere was performed by the Juilliard Orchestra conducted by Prieto at Alice Tully Hall, New York City, on January 27, 2017.

== Composition ==
The piece lasts about 29 minutes and is cast in four movements:

1. Black
2. Light
3. In Water
4. Red

According to the score program note, the movement titles "allude to the mysterious associations and creative manifestations of music through a series of characteristics that represent our existence as a society," with "Black" representing humanity's atavistic and chaotic origins, "Light" representing laws and principles prioritizing order, "In Water" representing the equilibrium between the individual and society at large, and "Red" representing the struggle against injustice and all that causes disharmony.

=== Instrumentation ===
Hominum is scored for a large orchestra consisting of a piccolo, two flutes, alto flute, two oboes, Cor anglais, two clarinets, bass clarinet, two bassoons, contrabassoon, four horns, four trumpets, two trombones, bass trombone, tuba, timpani, five percussionists, two harps, piano (doubling celesta), and strings.

== Reception ==
Reviewing the Scottish premiere in Glasgow performed by Prieto and the Royal Scottish National Orchestra, The Herald described the concerto as "one of the most exciting pieces of new music heard in Scotland this year." Ken Walton of The Scotsman similarly wrote, "Ortiz's musical discourse on the human condition, its primeval instincts for societal order versus the turbulent unpredictability of the individual, set the mood, its volatile temperament vying between the delicate, breathy colours of the opening and wild rhythmic games that come and go as the work's four evocative sections run their course."
