= Richard Hamburger =

American theater director (born 1951)

- Born: 1951 (age 73–74); Manhattan, New York City, New York United States
- Occupation: Theatre director
- Website: Richard Hamburger official Web site

Richard Hamburger (born 1951) is an American theater director. He has directed an extensive range of plays in theaters nationwide, and from 1987 to 1992 was Artistic Director of the Portland Stage Company before being named the fifth Artistic Director of the Dallas Theater Center (DTC) in 1992. He left the DTC in 2007, and continues to direct plays in theaters nationwide.

== Early life and career ==
Hamburger was born and raised in Manhattan in New York City, New York. He obtained his high school diploma from The Putney School in Putney, Vermont, in 1969, and his bachelor's degree in drama from the Yale School of Drama at Yale University in 1972. Hamburger next received formal training as a clown and spent a year as a featured clown with the Ringling Bros. and Barnum & Bailey Circus.

Hamburger worked at a number of theaters and directed plays in a wide range of venues between 1974 and 1986, including The Acting Company, The American Place Theatre, Circle in the Square Theatre School, Great Lakes Theater Festival, the Yale Repertory Theatre, and the Juilliard Theatre Center (where he also taught drama). The New York Times praised his direction of Thomas Strelich's Neon Psalms at The American Place Theater in 1986, saying its "staging subtly veers away from overstatement."

He was appointed the Artistic Director of the Portland Stage Company in Portland, Maine, in 1987. He directed a wide range of avant-garde productions, experimental plays, and modern theater while at Portland Stage, including Mac Wellman's Terminal Hip in the 1989-1990 season (which later won an Obie Award) and Erik Ehn's Wolf at the Door in the 1990-1991 season.

== Dallas Theater Center ==
In 1992, Hamburger was named the fifth Artistic Director of the Dallas Theater Center. His philosophy at the DTC was that the company should feature "fabulous young writers exploring theatrical forms." Having grown up in New York City, and spending much of his professional life there or in Portland, he never learned to drive a car. He walked, bicycled, or took a taxi cab. "I learned to drive in Dallas," he said, and purchased his first automobile.

While at the DTC, Hamburger directed or produced several notable plays, including Topdog/Underdog (which won the Pulitzer Prize for Drama in 2002) and Anna in the Tropics (which won the Pulitzer Prize for Drama in 2003), both in 2004. His 1999 production of South Pacific won national praise for its design and production, and was called "a virtual reinvention of the Rodgers and Hammerstein musical" by D Magazine. D Magazine also highly praised his 2001 production of Twelfth Night and 2006 direction of Cat on a Hot Tin Roof.

Preferring to hire New York City actors rather than local talent, he dissolved the acting company that had been assembled by Adrian Hall, DTC artistic director from 1983 to 1989, and mostly retained by Hall's successor, Ken Bryant. His time at the helm of the DTC was not without problems. Staff claimed he was difficult to work for, he staged numerous mediocre shows with production designs imported from other playhouses (most notably A Day in the Death of Joe Egg and The Illusion in the 2005-2006 season), and he hired a director of marketing whose stormy tenure was short and very costly.

Hamburger abruptly left the DTC in August 2006 after 15 years with the company. Hamburger denied that he was forced out, but also admitted that he had clashed with unnamed individuals over several issues (which he also refused to discuss).

=== Post-DTC work ===
DTC named Hamburger Artistic Director Emeritus upon his departure, and he moved to New York City. He has continued to direct plays nationwide in a variety of theaters and venues. Among his more notable productions was the 2006-2007 Salzburg Marionette Theatre production of The Sound of Music, which toured Europe; his 2008 direction of Michael Feingold's Japanoir at the Ensemble Studio Theatre in New York City (which Leonard Jacobs of the New York Press praised for its "brisk direction"); and the 2012 production of Curse of the Starving Class for the Wilma Theater in Philadelphia, Pennsylvania (the first time he had ever directed a play by Sam Shepard).

In September 2014, Hamburger was named by the Stage Directors and Choreographers Foundation (SDCF) to the 2014-2015 Committee for the Joe A. Callaway Award, the only peer-given award for excellence in direction and choreography in the theater.

== Personal life ==
Hamburger is married to Melissa Cooper, a former performance artist, actress, and playwright who co-founded the Echo Theatre. The couple lives in New York City with their son.
