= Téenek — Invenciones de Territorio =

Orchestral work by Gabriela Ortiz

Téenek – Invenciones de Territorio is an orchestral composition written in 2017 by the Mexican composer Gabriela Ortiz. The work was commissioned by the Los Angeles Philharmonic, which first performed the piece under the direction of Gustavo Dudamel at the Walt Disney Concert Hall on October 12, 2017.

== Composition ==
Téenek is composed in a single movement and lasts about 12 minutes. The title of the piece comes from the eponymous language spoken by the indigenous Huastec people in the Huasteca region of Mexico.

=== Instrumentation ===
The work is scored for a large orchestra comprising piccolo, three flutes (3rd doubling picollo and alto flute), two oboes, English horn, two clarinets, bass clarinet, two bassoons, contrabassoon, four horns, four trumpets, three trombones, tuba, timpani, four percussionists, harp, celesta, piano, and strings.

== Reception ==
Tim Ashley of The Guardian gave Téenek a positive review, remarking, "Ortiz self-consciously celebrates ideas of diversity and difference within a global unity, while her style, all asymmetric rhythms and angular melodies, takes The Rite of Spring as its point of departure." The music critic Colin Anderson similarly described the piece as "exuberant, vibrant and filmic, with plenty of incident, if nicely varied in mood and scoring to avoid sameness, although ultimately it's a carnival of colour contrasted, midpoint, with soulful solos for numerous instruments heard against an ethereal background, and then careering to the finishing post with force and growing loudness." He added, "Enjoyable if perhaps not much to go back for." However, in a more indifferent review, Richard Morrison of The Times described the piece as merely "well-meaning."
