= James M. Stephenson =

- Born: February 4, 1969 (age 57); Joliet, Illinois
- Other name: Jim Stephenson
- Occupation: Composer
- Website: composerjim.com

James M. Stephenson (born February 4, 1969), also known as Jim Stephenson, is an American composer known for writing contemporary classical music. He has written a number of works for large ensembles as well as chamber music and solo works.

In addition to his career as a composer, Stephenson is also active as an arranger and conductor.

== Biography ==
James M. Stephenson was born in Joliet, Illinois, and began playing trumpet at the age of 9. He stayed in the Midwest and attended the Interlochen Arts Academy until college, where he attended the New England Conservatory of Music for a degree in trumpet performance. At NEC, his teachers were Charles Schlueter, Gilbert Johnson, and John Lindenau. Following graduation in 1990, Stephenson joined the trumpet section of the Naples Philharmonic, a position he held for 17 seasons.

As a member of the Naples Philharmonic Brass Quintet, he volunteered his time to begin arranging works for the groups. The Naples Philharmonic pops conductor, Erich Kunzel, took notice of this and asked Stephenson to arrange a work for orchestra. This initial decision, led to a hobby of arranging that turned into composing original music, which resulted in another career over the course of 14 years. In 2007, Stephenson made a career transition from full time trumpet player to composer and conductor. With over 300 works in his catalog, he attributes his time as an orchestral player to having a strong influence on his voice as a composer, and giving him a deep knowledge of how the instruments connect and work together.

Stephenson lived in Naples, Florida from 1990 to 2007, where he met his wife in the Naples Philharmonic. In 2007, he moved with his wife Sally and their four children back to the Chicagoland area, where he currently resides.

== Career ==
Most of his new works were the results of commissions, allowing Stephenson to work with orchestras and performers around the country, on both his new works and existing arrangements. His music has been performed by ensembles like the Chicago Symphony Orchestra, San Francisco Ballet, Boston Pops, "The President's Own" United States Marine Band, Grant Park Symphony Orchestra, ROCO, Minnesota Orchestra, St. Louis Symphony, and Joffrey Ballet, among others.

Stephenson was Composer-in-Residence with the Lake Forest Symphony Orchestras for ten seasons, from 2010 to 2020. He was a musical collaborator with the Grand Rapids Symphony during the 2020–2021 season, creating a concert for violinist Joshua Bell and soprano Larissa Martinez.

Symphony No. 2: "VOICES" received award recognition, having won the American Bandmasters Association Sousa/Ostwald Award in 2018 and National Band Association William D. Revelli Memorial Composition Contest in 2017. "Liquid Melancholy — Clarinet Music of James M Stephenson" (Cedille Records) recorded by John Bruce Yeh and Lake Forest Symphony was nominated for a Grammy Award for Best Engineered Album, Classical.

== Selected compositions ==
=== Opera ===
- Cåraboo, an opera in one act (2023)

=== Ballet ===
- Wooden Dimes (2022)
- Princess and the Pea (2025)

=== Brass Band ===
- A Tribute to Louis Armstrong, for solo cornet and brass band (2007); also arranged for solo trumpet and orchestra
- Concerto No. 2 for Trumpet "Rextreme" (2010)
- American Fanfare (2015) (Note: Transcription of original orchestra version. Transcription by the composer.)
- RiverField (2023)

=== Orchestra ===
==== Full Orchestra ====
- Legend of Sleepy Hollow, for orchestra and narrator (1996); also available for chamber orchestra and narrator, and concert band and narrator
- American Fanfare (1999); won the 1999 Florida Orchestra Fanfare Competition. Also arranged for brass band, wind ensemble, and grade 3 concert band
- Stars and Stripes Fanfare (arr. 2007); also available for concert band and trumpet ensemble
- Celestial Suite (2013) (Note: Transcribed from original brass quintet version. Transcription done by the composer.)
- there are no words (2015); also available for chamber orchestra, concert band, and mixed chamber ensemble
- Taps (arr. 2016); also available for solo trombone and trombone ensemble, concert band, and cello ensemble
- CitySpeaks, for orchestra and spoken-word artist (2019)
- Symphony No. 3 (2019)
- Fanfare for Democracy (2021); also available for concert band (Note: Transcribed from original brass ensemble version. Transcription done by the composer.)
- Wooden Dimes: Ballet Suite (2022)
- Symphony No. 2: VOICES (2023) (Note: Transcribed from original wind ensemble version. Transcription done by the composer.)
- You have reached city limits (2024)

==== Chamber Orchestra ====
- Legend of Sleepy Hollow, for chamber orchestra and narrator (2004) (Note: Adapted from original orchestra version. Adapted by the composer.)
- Chamber Concerto for Orchestra (2009)
- Celebration Overture (2010)
- there are no words (2015)
- SCRAM!, for chamber orchestra (2022) (Note: Adapted from original work for trumpet and wind ensemble. Adaptation from the composer.) (Note: A piano reduction is also available.)
- Persephone, for 13-member chamber ensemble (2023)
- The Planets, adapted for chamber orchestra and SSA chorus (2024) (Note: Chamber orchestration of original work by Gustav Holst)

==== String Orchestra ====
- Printemps (2004) (Note: Adapted from original string quartet version.)
- The Storyteller, for trumpet and string orchestra (2013); also available for solo trumpet with wind ensemble, concert band, brass quintet, and original chamber version (Note: Adapted from original work for trumpet, violin, and piano. Adaptation from the composer.)
- Gavotte Goes Up, for middle school string orchestra (2018)
- Together (2018)

==== Concertos ====
===== Brass =====
- Concerto in D (Vivaldi/Bach, arr. Stephenson), for piccolo trumpet, strings, and continuo (2001)
- Concerto No. 1, for trumpet and orchestra (2003); also available for trumpet and wind ensemble
- Concerto for piano, trumpet, and strings (2007)
- La Grande Vitesse: A Triple Brass Concerto, for trumpet, French horn, and trombone with orchestra (2009)
- Sonata Rhapsody “The Arch,” for bass trombone and orchestra (2009); also available for bass trombone and wind ensemble (Note: Adapted from original bass trombone and piano solo. Adapted by the composer.)
- Concerto Braziliano, for trombone and chamber orchestra (2010); also available for trombone and wind ensemble
- Concerto No. 2 for Trumpet "Rextreme" (2010); also available for trumpet and wind ensemble, trumpet and brass band
- Sounds Awakened: Concerto for french horn and orchestra (2012)
- Concerto No. 3 “Concerto for Hope,” for trumpet and orchestra (2016); also available for trumpet and wind ensemble
- Concerto Rhasody “The Arch,” for bass trombone and orchestra (2017); also available for bass trombone and wind ensemble
- Concerto for bass trombone and orchestra (2018)
- PILLARS: Concerto for low brass and orchestra (2018)

===== Woodwinds =====
- Cousins, for trumpet and saxophone with orchestra (2007)
- Concerto for Flute "Pandora's Box," for flute and orchestra (2010)
- Duels and Dances, for oboe and chamber orchestra (2011) (Note: Transcription of oboe and wind ensemble version. Transcription by the composer.)
- Liquid Melancholy, for clarinet and orchestra (2011)

===== Piano =====
- Concerto for piano, trumpet, and strings (2007)
- Concerto for piano and orchestra (2021)

===== Strings =====
- Concerto Fantasie, for violin (2005)
- Concerto for Violin “Tributes” (2009)

===== Additional =====
- Concerto for cell phone (2006)

==== Young Audience ====
- Compose Yourself!, for full orchestra or 15-player chamber ensemble (2002)
- ROCOmotive, for chamber orchestra (2019)
- Once Upon a Symphony, an educational program for full orchestra or chamber ensemble (2021)

=== Wind ensemble/concert band ===
- American Fanfare (2006) (Note: Transcription of original orchestra version. Transcription by the composer.)
- Symphony No. 1 (2006)
- Interprid Promise (2012)
- Symphony No. 2: VOICES (2016); winner of the ABA Ostwald Award and the NBA William D. Revelli Memorial Composition Contest
- Celebration Overture (2018)
- Chorale in Blue (2018)
- In the Moment (2018)
- Requiem Dances (2018)
- Exhale! (2020)
- Voyages: Concerto for Brass Ensemble (2020)
- Eyes on the Bison (2021)
- Fanfare for Democracy (2021)
- Concerto for Wind Ensemble (2022)
- Lonesome Valley Folk Suite (2022)
- Hymn for US (2023)
- Sunburst Fanfare (2023)
- Symphony No. 4 (2023)
- Declaration (2024)
- Genesis (2024)
- RiverField (2024) (Note: Transcription of original version for brass band. Transcription by Robert R. Schwartz.)

==== Concertos ====
===== Brass =====
- Sonata No. 1, for trumpet and wind ensemble (2001)
- Concerto No. 1, for trumpet and wind ensemble (2003)
- Sonata Rhapsody “The Arch,” for bass trombone and wind ensemble (2009) (Note: Adapted from original bass trombone and piano solo. Adapted by the composer.)
- Concerto Braziliano, for trombone and wind ensemble (2010)
- Concerto No. 2 for Trumpet "Rextreme" (2010)
- Dodecafecta, for solo brass quintet and wind ensemble (2010)
- Sounds Awakened: Concerto for french horn and wind ensemble (2012)
- A Little R&R, for two solo trumpets and wind ensemble (2013)
- It's About Time, for two solo trumpets and wind ensemble (2013)
- Three Bones Concerto, for three solo trombones and wind ensemble (2013)
- Hanging by a Thread, for solo trumpet, solo tuba, and wind ensemble (2014)
- Vast and Curious, for French horn, tuba, and wind ensemble (2014)
- Spinning Wheel, for trumpet and wind ensemble (2015)
- Concerto Grosso, for flute, alto saxophone, bass trombone, and marimba with wind ensemble (2016)
- Concerto for Piccolo Trumpet with wind ensemble (2016)
- Concerto No. 3 “Concerto for Hope,” for trumpet and wind ensemble (2016)
- Concerto Rhasody “The Arch,” for bass trombone and wind ensemble (2017)

===== Woodwinds =====
- Duels and Dances, for oboe and wind ensemble (2011)
- Concerto Grosso, for flute, alto saxophone, bass trombone, and marimba with wind ensemble (2016)
- Möbius Trip, for alto saxophone and wind ensemble (2017)
- Code of Conduct, for saxophone with wind ensemble (2022)

===== Percussion =====
- Concerto Grosso, for flute, alto saxophone, bass trombone, and marimba with wind ensemble (2016)
- Perpetual Notion, for solo percussion and wind ensemble (2019)

===== Guitar =====
- Unfrettered, for guitar and wind ensemble (2020)

===== Additional =====
- Concerto for cell phone (2006)

=== Adaptable Ensemble (Flex) ===
- Loop D Loop – adaptable (2018), for 5-part adaptable ensemble + optional percussion (Note: Adapted from the original solo for trombone and loop pedal. Adapted by the composer.)
- 2/2 Tango – adaptable (2020), for 5-part adaptable ensemble + optional percussion
- Fiesta! – adaptable (2020), for 2-part adaptable ensemble + optional percussion
- Holiday Carol Medley – adaptable (2020), for 5-part adaptable ensemble
- No Thing Can Die as Others Do – adaptable (2020), for 5-part adaptable ensemble
- Reflections – adaptable (2020), for 3-part adaptable ensemble
- Ubi Caritas – adaptable (2020), for 5-part adaptable ensemble + two solo instruments or voices
- May the Road Rise to Meet You – adaptable (2021), for flexible band, orchestra, or choir

=== Chorus ===
- No Thing Can Die as Others Do, for SATB choir (2014)
- Cantata for the Unsung, for soprano, tenor, children's chorus, and orchestra (2016)
- Life Has Loveliness to Sell, for SAT chorus, concert band, and optional strings (2018)
- Peace on Earth, for youth choir and piano (2018)
- Working Together, for SATB chorus and concert band (2022)
- The Planets, adapted for chamber orchestra and SSA chorus (2024) (Note: Chamber orchestration of original work by Gustav Holst)

== Selected discography ==
=== Albums ===
Title	Year	Record label	Included composition(s)
Heritage to Horizons	2011	Altissimo	American Fanfare
United States Air Force Band of Liberty: On Silver Wings	2011	Altissimo	American Fanfare
Bold Blue & Bright	2014	Opening Day Entertainment Group Inc.	Bagatelle Bold, Blue and Bright
James M. Stephenson: The Devil's Tale	2015	Ravello Records	The Devil's Tale
Radiance	2015	Summit Records	"Croatian" Trio
Reflections	2015	Equilibrium	A Dialogue of Self and Soul
Under Western Skies	2016	Klavier	A Little R and R It's About Time
Bolcom & Friends	2018	Equilibrium	The Storyteller
Freedom of Movement: 21st Century Trumpet Concertos	2018	Summit Records	Concerto No. 2 "Rextreme"
Horizon	2018	Summit Records	The Storyteller
Liquid Melancholy: Clarinet Music of James M Stephenson	2018	Cedille Records	Liquid Melancholy Colors Last Chants Fantasie Etude Caprice Clarinet Sonata
The Beginning of Everything	2018	Summit Records	Mexican Folklore Suite
Almost All-American: 21st Century Works for Clarinet	2019	Albany Records	Clarinet Sonata Bagatelle Fantasie
A Winter's Night	2019	Anne McNamara	The Storyteller
Rêverie	2019	Summit Records	Spitfire
In Memoriam	2020	Matthew Onstad	The Storyteller
Soinuaren Bidaia II	2020	Alberto Urretxo	Storyteller
Noteworthy	2020	GIA WindWorks	Symphony No. 2 "Voices"
2019 WASBE Conference: Unión Musical Santa Cecilia de Villar del Arzobispo (Live)	2020	Mark Records	Symphony No. 2 "Voices"
As the Fireflies Watched: Chamber Music of James M. Stephenson	2021	Klavier	Octet As the Fireflies Watched Suite of Suites Walk Slowly
Cenotaph	2021	Mark Records	Symphony No. 2 "Voices"
Eternal Spring	2021	Fanfare Cincinnati	Remember Forward Spinning Wheel Elegy for Mundy
Great Lakes Duo: Musi for Trumpet & Organ in the 21st Century	2021	Great Lakes Duo	Fanfare for an Angel
Monuments	2022	The President's Own Marine Band	Wooden Dimes: Ballet for Wind Ensemble
Secret Harbors	2022	Blue Griffin Recording	Mind Fields
Vignettes: Music for Trumpet & Brass	2022	Albany Records	Gilded Fanfare
Visions	2022	Cedille Records	Symphony No. 3 "Visions"
New American Treasures	2023	Soundset Recordings	L'esprit de la trompette
The Bow and the Brush - 14 Premieres for Unaccompanied Violin	2023	Dan Flanagan	Guillaumin, after a Pastel by Armand Guillaumin
Zodiac Concerto II	2023	University of Central Florida	Zodiac Concerto II
Games	2024	Mark Masters	Concerto for Wind Ensemble "Games"
Liquid Melancholy	2024	Tonsehen	Liquid Melancholy Lonesome Valley Folk Suite
Storyteller: Contemporary Concertos for Trumpet	2024	Cedille Records	The Storyteller Scram!
