= Gabriela Ortiz =

Mexican composer (born 1964)

Gabriela Ortiz Torres (born 20 December 1964) is a Mexican composer of contemporary classical music. She was Carnegie Hall's composer in residence for the 2024-2025 season, and her music is being performed by ensembles in Berlin, Vienna, London, Los Angeles and New York. Her 2024 Revolución diamantina featuring the Los Angeles Philharmonic, Gustavo Dudamel, and María Dueñas was nominated for four awards at the 2025 Grammys, receiving three, including Best Contemporary Classical Composition. For her works 'Yanga' and 'Dzonot' she won three awards at the 2026 Grammys.

== Biography ==
Gabriela Ortiz Torres was born in Mexico City, Mexico. Her parents were founding members of the Mexican folk music ensemble Los Folkloristas. She learned folk music at home, and then studied in Paris at the École normale de musique. She returned to Mexico City when her mother became ill, and studied composition there with Mario Lavista at the National Conservatory of Music. She continued her studies at the Guildhall School in London with Robert Saxton, and with Simon Emmerson at the University of London where she received a PhD in 1996.

After completing her studies, she took a position at the National School of Music at the National Autonomous University in Mexico City. She also taught at Indiana University in the United States. The Los Angeles Philharmonic has commissioned several works from her including the violin concerto Altar de Cuerda (2021-22).

In 2019 she joined the Academia de Artes. and in 2022 she was elected as a member of El Colegio Nacional.

== Music ==
Ortiz incorporates conventional notation techniques in her compositions, which have contemporary classical music, rock, African and Afro-Cuban influences. She has also composed pieces that incorporate experimental electro-acoustic elements.

In August 2026 her Revolución diamantina was featured in the "2026: Modern Classics at the Proms" programme at the 2026 BBC Proms, with the Los Angeles Philharmonic conducted by Gustavo Dudamel.

== Honors and awards ==
- Grammy Awards for Best Contemporary Classical Composition at 67th Annual Grammy Awards and 68th Annual Grammy Awards
- Civitella Ranieri Artistic Residency
- John Simon Guggenheim Memorial Foundation Fellowship
- Fulbright Fellowship
- Distincion Universidad Nacional
- First prize of the Silvestre Revueltas National Chamber Music Competition
- First Prize at the Alicia Urreta Composition Competition
- Composers Award Mexican Council for the Arts and Culture
- National Artists System Fellowship from the Mexican Council for the Arts and Culture
- Banff Center for the Arts Residency
- Inroads Commission, a Program of Arts International with funds from the Ford Foundation
- Rockefeller Foundation
- Mozart Medal, for Mexican Theatre and Music, Best Composer, 1997
- The Fundacion Cultural Bancomer Award

== Selected works ==
Dance scores

- Hacia La Deriva (1989)
- Eve and All the Rest (1991)
- Errant maneuvers (1993)

Orchestral

- Patios (1989)
- Concierta candela (1993) for solo percussion and orchestra
- Altar de Neón (1995) for percussion quartet and chamber orchestra
- Zocalo-Bastilla (1996) for violin, percussion, and orchestra
- Zocalo Tropical (1998) for flute, percussion, and orchestra
- Altar de Piedra (2002) for percussion and orchestra, commissioned by the Los Angeles Philharmonic
- Altar de Fuego (2010) for orchestra
- Altar de Viento (2015) for flute and orchestra
- Hominum — Concerto for Orchestra (2016)
- Téenek — Invenciones de Territorio (2017) for orchestra, commissioned by the Los Angeles Philharmonic
- Yanga (2019) for percussion quartet, chorus, and orchestra, commissioned by the Los Angeles Philharmonic
- Clara (2021) for orchestra, commissioned by the New York Philharmonic
- Altar de Cuerda (2021) violin concerto, commissioned by the Los Angeles Philharmonic
- Kauyumari (2021) for orchestra, commissioned by the Los Angeles Philharmonic
- Si el oxígeno fuera verde (2025) for orchestra

Opera

- Unicamente La Verdad (2010), libretto by Ruben Ortiz

Electro-acoustic

- Magna Sin (1992) for steel drum and tape
- 5 Micro Etudes (1992) for tape
- Things Like That Happened (1994) for cello and tape
- El Trompo (1994) for vibraphone and tape
- Altar de Muertos (1996) for string quartet and tape

Other works

- 100 Watts (1998) for clarinet, bassoon, piano
- Baalkah (1999) for soprano and string quartet
- Seis piezas a Violeta (2002) for string quartet and piano
- Corporea (2014) for mixed chamber ensemble, commissioned by San Francisco Contemporary Music Players

== Partial discography ==
- Musica Sinfonica Mexicana featuring Silvestre Revueltas, Federico Ibarra, Manuel Enriquez, and Jose Pablo Moncayo Garcia (1997)
- Ritmicas featuring Minoru Miki, Santiago Ojeda, Amadeo Roldan, and Eugenio Toussaint (1997)
- Mi Chelada featuring Alejandro Cardona, Gabriel Ruiz, Astor Piazzolla, Miguel del Aguila, and Enrico Chapela (2000)
- Visiones Panamericanas featuring Tania Leon, Eugenio Toussaint, Roberto Sierra, and Richard Felciano (2002)
- Tear featuring Ruth Crawford Seeger, Silvestre Revueltas, Adriana Isabel Figueroa Mañas, and Alberto Ginastera (2003)
- Altar de Muertos featuring Arturo Nieto-Dorantes and Sarah Leonard (2005)
- Aroma Foliando featuring Southwest Chamber Music (2013)
- Denibée featuring Alejandro Escuer (2014)
- Revolución diamantina featuring the Los Angeles Philharmonic, Gustavo Dudamel, and Maria Duenas (2024)
- Yanga featuring Los Angeles Philharmonic, Gustavo Dudamel and Alisa Weilerstein (2025)
