= Nilo Cruz =

Cuban-American playwright and pedagogue

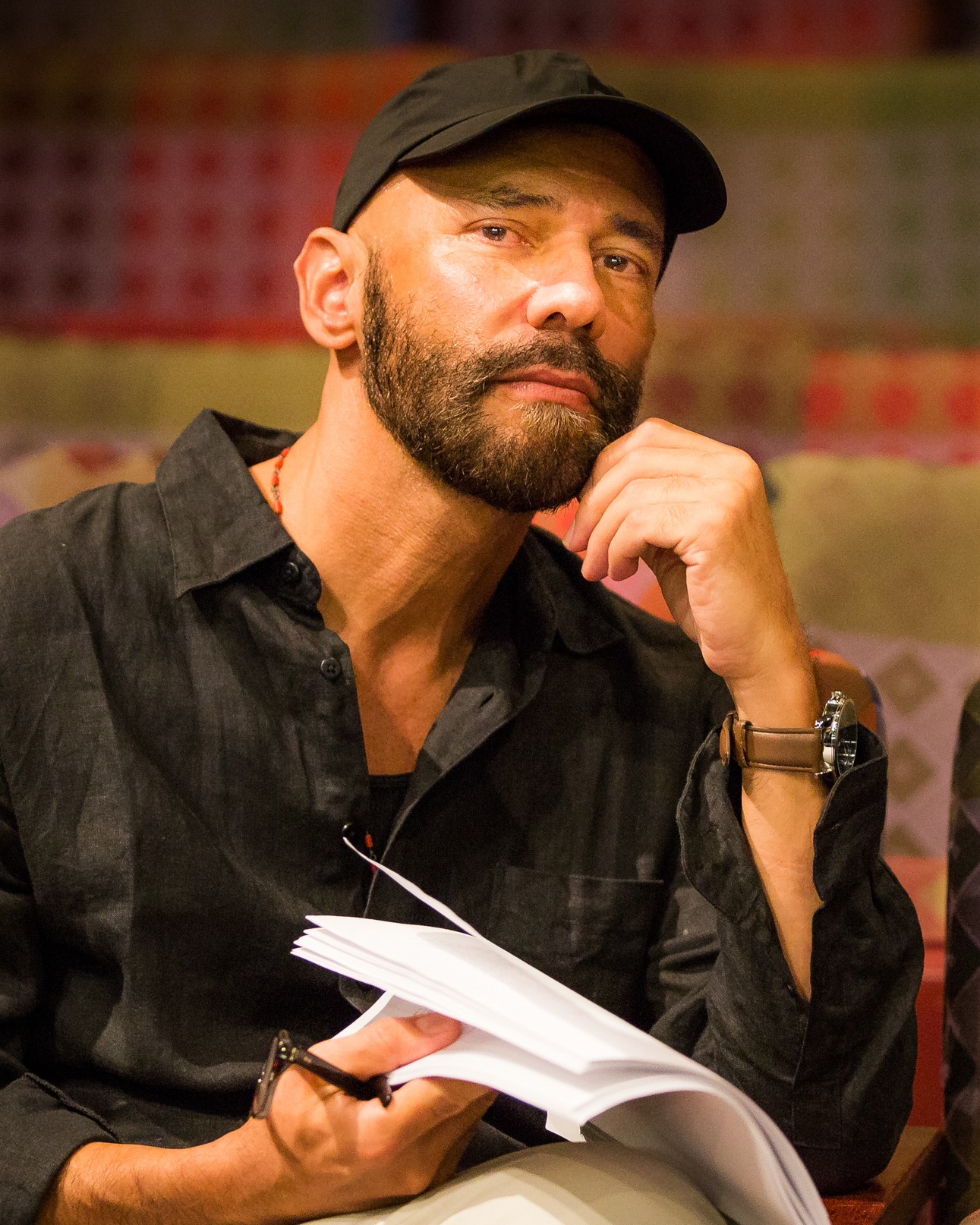
- Born: Matanzas, Cuba
- Education: Miami Dade College (BA); Brown University (MFA)
- Occupations: Playwright, pedagogue
- Writing career
- Notable works: Two Sisters and a Piano
- Notable awards: Pulitzer Prize for Drama (2003)

Nilo Cruz is a Cuban-American playwright and pedagogue. With his award of the 2003 Pulitzer Prize for Drama for his play Anna in the Tropics, he became the second Latino so honored, after Nicholas Dante.

== Biography ==
=== Early years ===
Cruz was born in 1960 to Tina and Nilo Cruz Sr. in Matanzas, Cuba. The family immigrated to Little Havana in Miami, Florida, in 1970 on a Freedom Flight, and eventually naturalised to the United States. His interest in theater began with acting and directing in the early 1980s. He studied theater first at Miami-Dade Community College, later moving to New York City, where Cruz studied under fellow Cuban María Irene Fornés. Fornes recommended Cruz to Paula Vogel who was teaching at Brown University where he would later receive his M.F.A. in 1994.

=== Career ===
In 2001, Cruz served as the playwright-in-residence for the New Theatre in Coral Gables, Florida, where he wrote Anna in the Tropics. Rafael de Acha, artistic director of the New Theatre, produced and directed the world premiere performance of Anna in the Tropics, which won the 2003 Pulitzer Prize for Drama and the Steinberg Award for Best New Play.

After the play was awarded the Pulitzer and Steinberg awards, Emily Mann directed a production at the McCarter Theatre in Princeton, New Jersey, and the play then had its Broadway premiere with Jimmy Smits in the lead role.

Some of the theatres that have developed and performed Cruz's works include New York's Public Theater, New York Theatre Workshop, Pasadena Playhouse, McCarter Theatre, Oregon Shakespeare Festival, South Coast Repertory, The Alliance, New Theatre, Florida Stage, and the Coconut Grove Playhouse.

Cruz wrote the book of the Frank Wildhorn-Jack Murphy musical Havana. Its scheduled world premiere at the Pasadena Playhouse has been delayed by the theatre's declaration of bankruptcy in 2010.

Cruz has translated plays into both Spanish and English. His adaptation and translation of La vida es sueño (Life Is a Dream) in English premiered at South Coast Repertory in 2007. He translated the script for Hamlet, Prince of Cuba at Asolo Repertory Theatre into Spanish for the 2012 production that ran simultaneously in English and Spanish on alternating nights.

Cruz has been the recipient of numerous awards and fellowships, including two NEA/TCG National Theatre Artist Residency grants, a Rockefeller Foundation grant, San Francisco's W. Alton Jones award, a Kennedy Center Fund for New American Plays award, and a USA Artist Fellowship.

Cruz is a frequent collaborator with Peruvian-American composer Gabriela Lena Frank. To date, they have completed a set of orchestral songs, La centinela y la paloma (The Keeper and the Dove), for soprano Dawn Upshaw and the Saint Paul Chamber Orchestra (premiered under the baton of Joana Carneiro in February 2011); The Saint Maker for soprano Jessica Rivera, mezzo-soprano Rachel Calloway, the San Francisco Girls Chorus, and the Berkeley Symphony in May 2013; Journey of the Shadow for narrator and ensemble of eleven players (San Francisco Chamber Orchestra premiering in April 2013); the Conquest Requiem for soprano, baritone, orchestra, and chorus for the Houston Symphony under the baton of Andrés Orozco-Estrada in May 2017 which will be recorded by the Nashville Symphony in November 2022 for the Naxos label; and Cinco Lunas de Lorca (The Five Moons of Lorca) as a digital short for countertenor, choir, and piano for the Los Angeles Opera. Their newest project is El último sueño de Frida y Diego (The Last Dream of Frida and Diego), a two-act opera commissioned by San Diego Opera and San Francisco Opera with a premiere in October 2022.

Cruz penned the libretto to composer Jimmy López's opera Bel Canto which had its world premiere at the Lyric Opera of Chicago on December 7, 2015.

Cruz's most recent work is Bathing in Moonlight, a world premiere featuring Raúl Méndez, Priscilla Lopez, Hannia Guillen, Frankie J. Alvarez, Michael Rudko, and Katty Velasquez. Directed by Emily Mann, Bathing in Moonlight ran September 9 to October 9, 2016, at the McCarter Theatre in Princeton, New Jersey. Bathing in Moonlight is the recipient of an Edgerton Foundation New Play Award and a 2016 Greenfield Prize.

Cruz is an alumnus of New Dramatists and has taught playwriting at Brown University, the University of Iowa, and Yale University. He currently lives in New York City and Miami.

=== Awards and honors ===
In 2003, Cruz received the Pulitzer Prize for Drama for his play Anna in the Tropics.

In 2009, Cruz received the PEN/Laura Pels International Foundation for Theater Award for a distinguished American playwright in mid-career.

In 2010, Cruz was awarded the honorary Doctor of Humane Letters (L.H.D.) from Whittier College.

== Work ==
=== Plays ===
- Dancing on Her Knees (1994)
- Night Train to Bolina (1995)
- A Park in Our House (1995)
- Two Sisters and a Piano (1998)
- A Bicycle Country (1999)
- Hortensia and the Museum of Dreams (2001)
- Anna in the Tropics (2002)
- Lorca in a Green Dress (2003)
- Capricho (2003)
- Beauty of the Father (2006)
- The Color of Desire (2010)
- Hurricane (2010)
- Sotto Voce (2014)
- Bathing in Moonlight (2016)
- Exquisita Agonía (Exquisite Agony) (2018)

=== Musicals ===
- Havana – music by Frank Wildhorn, lyrics by Jack Murphy, book by Cruz

=== Translations ===
- A Very Old Man With Enormous Wings – a children's play that is an adaptation of a short story by Gabriel García Márquez
- Doña Rosita the Spinster – by Federico García Lorca
- The House of Bernarda Alba – by Federico García Lorca
- Life Is a Dream – by Pedro Calderón de la Barca

== See also ==
- List of Cuban Americans
- List of Cuban American writers
- Cuban American literature
