= Nikolai Lopatnikoff =

Russian-American composer

Nikolai Lopatnikoff (Russian, Николай Львович Лопатников; born 16 March 1903 in Tallinn - 7 October 1976 in Pittsburgh, Pennsylvania) was a Russian-American composer, music teacher and university lecturer. He composed some works of neoclassical music.

== Life ==
=== Europe ===
Lopatnikoff studied music theory and piano at the Conservatory of St. Petersburg, until he fled the Russian Revolution with his family in 1917, landing in Helsinki, Finland. He continued his studies at the Sibelius Academy in Helsinki until 1920.

By 1921 his family had settled in Heidelberg, Germany where he began studying engineering at the University of Karlsruhe (Technischen Hochschule Karlsruhe), graduating in 1927. At the same time he was studying composition with Ernst Toch, Hermann Grabner and Willi Rehberg at the conservatory in Mannheim (Staatliche Hochschule für Musik und Darstellende Kunst Mannheim) and also in Berlin.

During this time, he composed the Piano Concerto No. 1 Op. 5, the 2nd Concerto for Piano and Orchestra, Op. 15 and Symphony No. 1, Op. 12. This symphony was performed by many orchestras in Europe and the USA and in 1932 by the Philadelphia Orchestra played it on tour. For the "German Chamber Music Baden-Baden 1927", a follow-up event of the Donaueschingen Music Days 1926, he composed as well as George Antheil pieces for mechanical piano "Welte-Mignon". Aaron Copland, who heard this performance on 16 July 1927, brought it to the attention of Sergei Koussevitzky, and so initiated a contact that would be decisive for Lopatnikoff's future. Koussevitzky engaged Lopatnikoff to orchestrate the pieces and offered cooperation. As a result, a long-standing connection between the two came about, which led to the premier of numerous Lopatnikoff works by the Boston Symphony Orchestra.

=== America ===
After working in the 1930s in Berlin, and beginning 1936 in London, mainly as a composer, he emigrated to the United States in 1939. He served as a professor of composition at the Hartt School of Music in Hartford, Connecticut, the Westchester Conservatory of Music in White Plains, New York and ultimately at the Carnegie Institute of Technology, now called Carnegie Mellon University in Pittsburgh, Pennsylvania. In 1944 he became an American citizen. He taught music theory and composition at Carnegie Mellon until his retirement in 1969. He died at his home in the Squirrel Hill neighborhood of Pittsburgh in 1976. He and his wife, poet Sara Henderson Hay, are buried at Pittsburgh's Homewood Cemetery.

His archive is located in the Library of Congress.

== Works ==
- Four Little Piano Pieces, Op. 1
- Prelude and Fugue, Op. 2
- Prelude to a Drama for Large Orchestra, Op. 3 (ca. 1922)
- First Concerto for Piano and Orchestra in C major, Op. 5a, premiered in Karlsruhe in 1927
- Concerto for Piano and Orchestra, Op. 5b
- Deuxième Quatuor, Quartet No. 2, Op. 6
- Deuxième Quatuor en ut pour deux Violons, Alto et Violoncelle, Op. 6a; Leipzig: MP Belaieff 1933
- Sonatine pour piano, Op. 7 (1928); Paris: Edition Russe de Musique, 1928
- Duo for Violin and Cello, Op. 8; Berlin: Edition Russe de Musique
- Sonata for violin, piano et tambour militaire, Op. 9; Berlin: Edition Russe de Musique, 1928
- Introduction et Scherzo (for orchestra), Op. 10; Paris: Edition Russe de Musique
- Sonate pour Violoncelle et Piano (Sonata for cello and piano), Op. 11; Paris: Edition Russe de Musique
- Symphony No. 1, Op. 12; Mainz: Schott
- Deux Danses ironiques, pour piano, Op. 13; Paris: Edition Russe de Musique
- Second Concerto for Piano and Orchestra, Op. 15 (My parents dedicated); Mainz: Schott 1950
- 5 contrasts for Piano (Five Contrasts), Op. 16; Mainz: Schott 1950
- 3 Pieces for Violin and Piano (Three Pieces for Violin and Piano), Op. 17, Mainz: Schott oJ
- Dialogues: Five Pieces for Piano, Op. 18 (1934); Mainz: Schott undated.
- Danton, opera in three acts, Op. 20 (by Georg Büchner )
- Danton Suite, Op. 21
- Variations for Piano (Variations for Piano), Op. 22; Mainz: Schott 1950
- Mädchenlied; Abendfrieden; Evening transition; Good night ...; I noticed ...; In April.
- Piano Trio (Trio en la mineur pour piano, violin and cello), Op. 23
- Symphony No. 2, Op. 24
- Violin Concerto, Op. 26; New York: Associated Music Publishers, 1944
- Sinfonietta, Op. 27; New York: Associated Music Publishers, 1949
- Opus sinfonicum (for orchestra), Op. 28; New York: Leeds Music Corporation, 1951
- Sonata for Piano No.1 in E Major, Op. 29 (about 1943); New York: Associated Music Publishers, 1946
- Concertino for Orchestra, Op. 30; New York: Leeds Music Corporation, 1953
- Variations and Epilogue for violin and cello, Op. 31 (about 1946); New York: Edward B. Marks Music Corporation, 1948
- Variations and Epilogue for Cello and Orchestra, Op. 31a
- Sonata No. 2 for violin and piano, Op. 32
- Concerto for 2 Pianos, Op. 33; New York: Leeds Music Corporation, 1953
- Divertimento for Orchestra, Op. 34; New York: Leeds Music Corporation, 1954
- Sonata for Violin and Piano No. 2, Op. 32; New York: Leeds Music Corporation, 1951
- Concerto for 2 Pianos and Orchestra, Op. 33 (1949)
- Symphony No. 3, Op. 35; New York: Leeds Music Corporation, 1951
- Quartet No. 3 for Strings, Op. 36
- Intervals, 7 studies for piano, Op. 37; New York: Leeds Music Corporation, 1957
- Variazioni concertanti, op 38, for orchestra. New York: Leeds Music Corporation, 1963
- Music for orchestra, Op. 39; New York: Leeds Music Corporation, 1960
- Music for Band, Op. 39a, Arranged by William A. Schaefer from the composer's Op. 39
- Festival Overture, Op. 40; New York: Leeds Music Corporation, 1965
- Concerto for Wind Symphony Orchestra, Op. 41
- Fantasia Concertante: for violin and piano, Op. 42 (1962); New York: MCA Music 1967
- Concerto for Orchestra, Op. 43 (circa 1964); New York: CF Peters Corporation, 1964
- Divertimento da camera, for flute, oboe, clarinet, bassoon, horn, trumpet, violin, cello, percussion and piano, Op. 44
- Partita concertante, for chamber orchestra, Op. 45
- Symphony No. 4, Op. 46

=== Works without opus number ===
- Arabesque, for two pianos, four hands (about 1948); New York: Associated Music Publishers, 1948
- Arabesque for cello or bassoon and piano (1950); New York: Leeds Music Corporation, 1950
- Arietta, for violin and piano; New York: G. Schirmer, 1943
- CHASE, for unidentified treble instrument and piano
- Dance piece for piano (edited by Isadore Freed) (1956)
- Dance piece for piano; Bryn Mawr, PA: Theodore Presser Co. 1956
- Eksprompt [Impromptu] and Prelude (for piano solo)
- Elegietta for cello and piano (1934); Mainz: Schott
- Gavotte (for piano solo); Paris: Les Editions de la Sirène Musicale 1929
- Melting-Pot, ballet in six scenes
- Sinfonietta for chamber orchestra (ca. 1949); New York: Music Press, 1947
- Time is Infinite Movement, for Three Voices (1947)
- Toccata for piano (original composition for mechanical piano Welte-Mignon ) (1927)
- Romans [Romance], for voice and piano (1923) on a text by Akhmatova (Karlsruhe 1931)
- Romans [Romance], for voice and piano (1924) on a text by Tiucher
- Scherzo (original composition for mechanical piano Welte-Mignon) (1927)
- Variations and Epilogue for cello and piano
