= Gabriela Lena Frank =

American musician (born 1972)

Gabriela Lena Frank (born September 26, 1972) is an American pianist and composer of contemporary classical music.

== Biography ==
Gabriela Lena Frank was born in Berkeley, California, United States. Her father is of Lithuanian Jewish heritage and her mother is Peruvian, of Chinese descent. She grew up in Berkeley, California. Her parents met when her father was a Peace Corps volunteer in Peru in the 1960s.

Frank received her bachelor's and master's degrees from Rice University and a Doctorate in Music Composition from the University of Michigan in 2001. She has studied composition with Paul Cooper, William Albright, Leslie Bassett, William Bolcom, Michael Daugherty, and Samuel Jones.

== Style ==
Frank's work often draws on her multicultural background, especially her mother's Peruvian heritage. In many of her compositions, she elicits the sounds of Latin American instruments such as Peruvian pan flute or charango guitar, although the works are typically scored for Western classical instruments and ensembles such as the symphony orchestra or string quartet. She has said, "I think the music can be seen as a by-product of my always trying to figure out how Latina I am and how gringa I am."

== Professional life ==
Frank's music has been commissioned and performed by the Kronos Quartet, pipa virtuoso Wu Man, San Francisco Symphony, Houston Symphony, Chanticleer Ensemble, the Chiara String Quartet, the Brentano Quartet, Yo Yo Ma and the Silk Road Project, the Marilyn Horne Foundation, guitarist Manuel Barrueco with the Cuarteto Latinoamericano, the King's Singers, directors of the Chamber Music Society of Lincoln Center Wu Han and David Finckel, soprano Dawn Upshaw and the St. Paul Chamber Orchestra, and others. She has received multiple commission from Carnegie Hall. Her piece Concertino Cusqueño was commissioned and premiered by the Philadelphia Orchestra in celebration of the start of that organization's newest conductor, Yannick Nézet-Séguin. Past performances include those by the Boston Symphony, the San Francisco Symphony, the Chicago Symphony, the Atlanta Symphony, the Baltimore Symphony, and the Los Angeles Philharmonic Green Umbrella series. She has an upcoming commissioned premiere with The Cleveland Orchestra in May 2014 and another commissioned premiere with the Houston Symphony in September 2014.

She has been composer-in-residence with many institutions including the Modesto Symphony, the Fort Worth Symphony, the Indianapolis Symphony, the Aspen Music Festival, the Seattle Symphony, the Nashville Symphony, the San Francisco Chamber Orchestra, and the Annapolis Symphony Orchestra. Between 2009 and 2012, she was the creative advisor to her hometown orchestra, the Berkeley Symphony Orchestra under the baton of frequent collaborator Joana Carneiro before stepping down to spend more time composing. Frank currently is composer-in-residence with the Detroit Symphony Orchestra conducted by Leonard Slatkin, and the Houston Symphony conducted by Andrés Orozco-Estrada. She has been featured at many festivals around the world including Music@Menlo, Tanglewood Music Festival, SongFest and with the Chicago Chamber Players, among others.

2009 saw Frank receive her first Guggenheim Fellowship as well as a Latin Grammy Award for best Contemporary Classical Music Composition for Inca Dances (Tonar Label), which was written for guitarist Manuel Barrueco and the Cuarteto Latinoamericano. She was also the feature of her first PBS documentary entitled "Peregrinos" (produced by Emmy-winning producer Aric Hartvig) regarding her residency with the Indianapolis Symphony orchestra where, with an award from the Joyce Foundation, she composed a work inspired by the stories of Latino immigrants in Indianapolis.

In 2010 Frank won a United States Artists Fellow award.

Gabriela Lena Frank is a member of the Silk Road Ensemble under the direction of cellist Yo Yo Ma. Her composition Ritmos Anchinos appears on the Silk Road Ensemble's album Off the Map (World Village & In a Circle Records, 2009). "Off the Map" was nominated for a 2011 Grammy for Best Classical Crossover Album.

Also in 2011, Frank released a complete CD of her works, entitled "Hilos," on the Naxos label with the Nashville-based ALIAS Ensemble, featuring a new mixed quartet written expressly for ALIAS. In its first week of release, it broke into the Billboard's top 100 Classical Recordings and was subsequently awarded a rare "10/10" rating by Classics Today. "Hilos" was nominated for a 2012 Grammy Award in the category of Best Small Ensemble Performance on which Frank plays piano. It has received more than a dozen positive reviews.

In 2012, Frank was sponsored by the US-Quito Embassy in Ecuador and small crowdsourced private donors through USA Artists to compose a new work for the Ecuadoran group La Orquesta de Instrumentos Andinos (Orchestra of Andean Instruments). The work, "Compadre Huashayo," is to be played entirely on indigenous instruments while drawing on a mix of modernist classical and traditional indigenous practices. Once again, PBS profiled Frank in a documentary, likewise entitled "Compadre Huashayo" that was premiered in fall 2013.

In 2013, Frank received the Medal of Excellence from the Sphinx Organization for outstanding young Black and Latino leaders in classical music. She received her award in a ceremony at the Supreme Court in Washington, D.C., meeting Justices Sonia Sotomayor and Ruth Ginsburg. Later that year, she released another CD of her chamber works with Meme Ensemble on the Albany Records label.

Frank is frequently performed by the Caminos del Inka collective under the direction of conductor Miguel Harth-Bedoya. She works closely with Pulitzer Prize-winning playwright Nilo Cruz in the creation of original new musical works for voice. Their first collaboration was a set of orchestra songs for Dawn Upshaw and the St. Paul Chamber Orchestra.

Frank is also a Grammy-nominated pianist. She has recorded the complete piano works of Pulitzer Prize–winning composer Leslie Bassett on the Equilibrium label. Recent performances include those with current and former members of the Los Angeles Philharmonic, the San Francisco Symphony, the Orpheus Chamber Orchestra, St. Luke's Orchestra, the Lydian Quartet, the Manhattan Quartet, and the Boston Symphony Orchestra.

Frank is a freelance composer who left her native San Francisco Bay Area in the fall of 2015 to start a farm with her husband in the town of Boonville, California in Mendocino County. In 2017, she founded her own school, the Gabriela Lena Frank Creative Academy of Music (www.glfcam.com) for emerging composers to work with renowned performers. She travels frequently throughout North and South America. She is also often a guest artist at universities and conservatories, giving performances, lectures, and lessons.

In 2020, Frank received the 25th Annual Heinz Award in the Arts and Humanities for her work "weaving Latin American influences into classical constructs and breaking gender, disability and cultural barriers in classical music composition."

In 2025 Frank was elected to the American Academy of Arts and Letters. In December 2025, she was named Composer of the Year 2026 by Musical America.

In May 2026, she was announced as winner of the Pulitzer Prize for Music, for her major work "Picaflor: A Future Myth," composed for the Philadelphia Orchestra, where she had been composer in residence.

== Selected works ==
=== Orchestra ===
- Apu: Tone Poem for Orchestra (2017) Commissioned by Carnegie Hall for the National Youth Orchestra of the United States of America
- Concertino Cusqueño (2012)
- Elegía Andina (2000)
- Escaramuza (2010)
- Five Scenes (2015)
- Karnavalingo (2013)
- Leyendas: An Andean Walkabout (string orchestra) (2001)
- Manchay Tiempo (Time of Fear) (2005)
- Peregrinos (2009)
- Raíces (2012)
- Requiem for a Magical America: El Día de los Muertos (orchestral version) (2012)
- Three Latin American Dances (2004)
- Two American Portraits (2008)
- Two Peruvian Dances (for beginning string orchestra) (2015)
- Walkabout: Concerto for Orchestra (2016)

=== Soloist(s) and orchestra ===
- La Centinela y la Paloma (The Keeper and the Dove) (2010) Soloist: Soprano
- Compadrazgo (2007) Soloists: Piano, cello
- Cuentos Errantes: Four New Folk Songs (2015) Soloist: Piano
- Havana Jila (2003) Violin
- Illapa: Tone Poem for Flute and Orchestra (2004) Soloist: Flute
- Journey of the Shadow (2013) Soloist: Narrator
- La Llorona: Tone Poem for Viola and Orchestra (2007) Soloist: Viola
- Will-o’-the-Wisp (2013) Soloist: Piccolo

=== Orchestral Winds and Percussion ===
- Requiem for a Magical America: El Día de los Muertos (2006)

=== Soloist(s) and Large Ensemble ===
- Compadre Huashayo (2012) Soloists: 3 Male voices; Ensemble: 3 Quena (3 Quenilla), 2 Flauta de Pan, 2 Zampoña, 6 Toyo, 6 Percussion, 4 Charango, 4 Bandolín, 4 Bandola, 6 Guitarra, Arpa Andina, Contrabass
- Haillí Lírico (2010) Soloist: Violin; Large Ensemble: 4fl, 2perc, 4vn, 2va, 2vc, 2db

=== Opera ===
- El último sueño de Frida y Diego (The Last Dream of Frida and Diego) (2022)
- Anna in the Tropics (2028)

=== Piano Solo ===
- Sonata Andina
