= Margaret Lucy Wilkins =

Lucy Wilkins (born 13 November 1939) is an English music educator and composer known for opera.

== Biography ==
Margaret Lucy Wilkins was born in Kingston-upon-Thames, England, and began composing at age twelve. She studied composition at Trinity College of Music in London with Gladdys Puttick and continued her education at the University of Nottingham where she earned her BMus. She continued studying composition there with James Fulkerson and earned her AMusD in 1995. Her compositions have been performed in Brazil, Bulgaria, China, France, Italy, Latvia, the Netherlands, Poland, Romania, Russia, Slovenia, South Korea, Spain, Switzerland, Ukraine, the UK, and the US.

Wilkins taught music theory and piano in St. Andrews from 1964 to 1976, and lectured on composition and women in music at the University of Huddersfield from 1976 to 2003. She also taught at Queen's University in Belfast as Maude Clarke Visiting professor in 1995.

Wilkins co-founded the Scottish Early Music Consort (1969) and later founded the new-music ensemble Polyphonia (1989), serving as music director from 1989 to 1993. She has been a member of professional organizations including the executive committee of the British Academy of Composers and Songwriters, the Council of the Society for the Promotion of New Music, the Board of Directors of the International Alliance of Women in Music, and the Honor Committee of the Fondazione Donne in Musica.

Wilkins is the author of Creative Music Composition: The Young Composer's Voice, 2006, ISBN 0-415-97467-4.

== Awards ==
- First Prize in the Young Composers Competition of the New Cantata Orchestra of London (1970, for Concerto Grosso)
- The Scottish Arts Council Award for Composers (1970)
- The Cappiani Prize for Women Composers (1971, for The Silver Casket)
- First Prize in the competition for teaching music in Halifax (1973, for Instrumental Interludes)

== Works ==
Wilkins has composed stage, orchestral, chamber, choral, vocal, piano, organ, harpsichord and electro-acoustic music. Selected works include:

- Concerto Grosso
- The Silver Casket
- Instrumental Interludes
- Aspects of Night
- Deux ex Machina
- Gitanjali
- Discover Oakwell
- Suite for Two for violin and viola (1968)
- Struwwelpeter (1973)
- Burnt Sienna: Etude for String Trio (1974)
- Lest We Forget (1979)
- A Dance to the Music of Time (1979)
- 366 for Solo Trombone (1986)
- Symphony (1989)
- Musica Angelorum (1991)
- Rituelle (1999)
- Trompettes de Mort (2003)
