= Cello Concerto (Carter) =

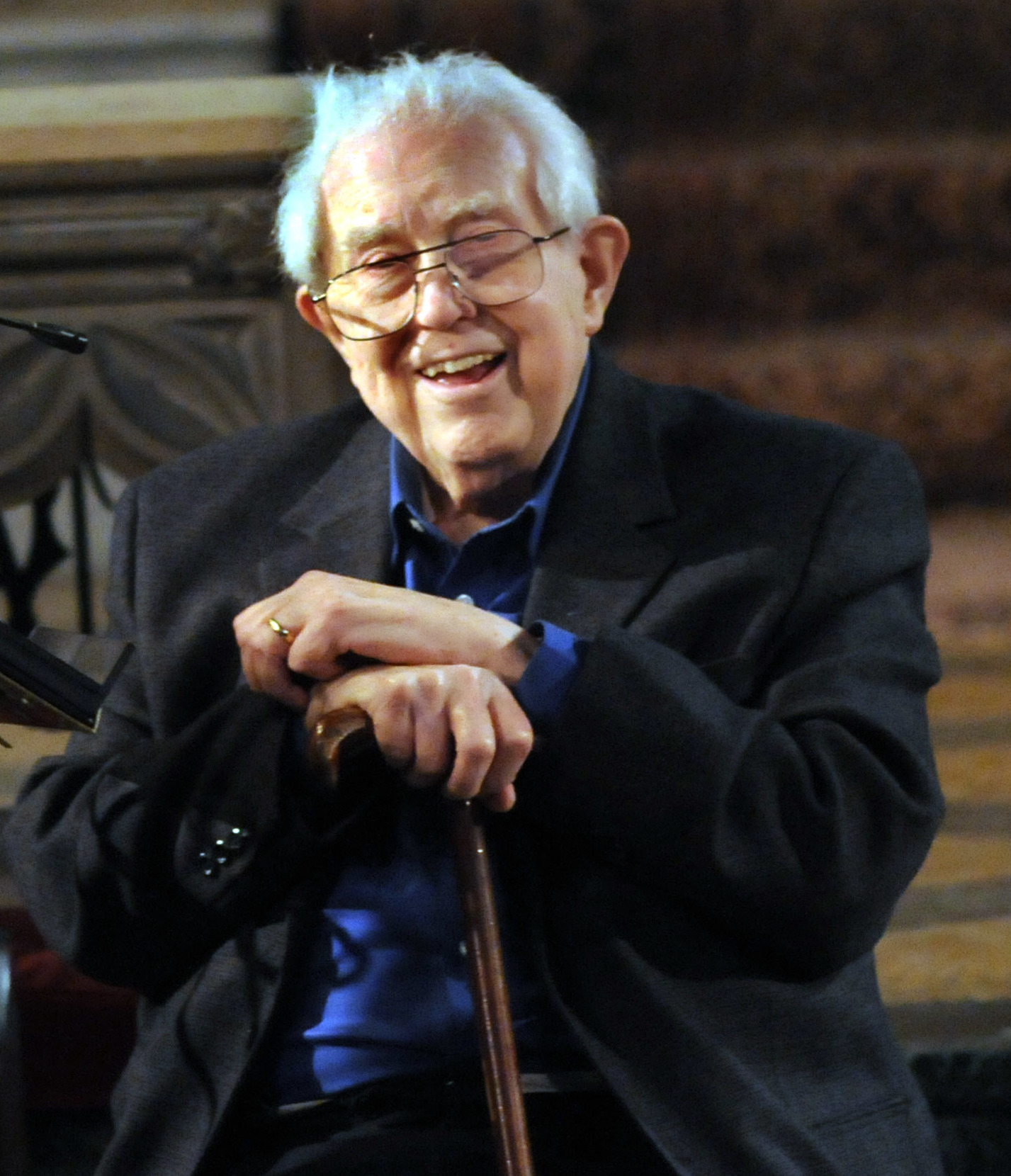
Elliott Carter in 2007

The Cello Concerto is a composition for solo cello and orchestra by the American composer Elliott Carter. The work was commissioned by the Chicago Symphony Orchestra for the cellist Yo-Yo Ma. It was first performed in Chicago, Illinois, on September 27, 2001, by Yo-Yo Ma and the Chicago Symphony Orchestra under the conductor Daniel Barenboim.

== Composition ==
The Cello Concerto has a duration of roughly 18 minutes and is composed in seven movements played continuously:

1. Drammatico
2. Allegro appassionato
3. Giocoso
4. Lento
5. Maestoso
6. Tranquillo
7. Allegro fantastico

Carter briefly described the composition in the score program notes, writing, "My Cello Concerto is introduced by the soloist alone, playing a frequently interrupted cantilena that presents ideas later to be expanded into movements. These movements are connected by episodes that often refer to the final 'Allegro fantastico'. In this score I have tried to find meaningful, personal ways of revealing the cello's vast array of wonderful possibilities."

=== Instrumentation ===
The work is scored for solo cello and an orchestra comprising three flutes (third doubling piccolo), two oboes, cor anglais, two clarinets (second doubling bass clarinet), bass clarinet (doubling contrabass clarinet), two bassoons, contrabassoon, four horns, three trumpets, three trombones, tuba, timpani, three percussionists, harp, and strings.

== Reception ==
The concerto has been praised by music critics. Steve Smith of The New York Times called it an "eruptive work" and praised its "mercurial shifts and puckish gestures." Andy Gill of The Independent said the work "offers [the soloist] a showcase in how to deal with the orchestra's sudden astringent tone-clusters and exclamatory percussion without ceding command: the progress from the Tranquillo to the Allegro fantastico is, well, fantastico." Peter Dickinson of Gramophone wrote:

The Carter [Cello] Concerto comes from his productive final phase. The idiom is not as abrasive as his middle-period works but he still challenges the soloist. [...] Carter said he aimed at 'meaningful, personal ways of revealing the cello's vast array of wonderful possibilities'. The soloist is mostly lyrical but the orchestra at times knocks the stuffing out of any sentimentality. The seven sections are continuous and the third one, marked giocoso, adds a touch of humour with some percussion.

== Recordings ==
The Cello Concerto has been recorded three times for commercial release. The first recording, performed by the cellist Fred Sherry and the BBC Symphony Orchestra, was released through Bridge Records on November 15, 2005. The second recording, a live recording with the cellist Jan Vogler and the Symphonieorchester des Bayerischen Rundfunks was released by Neos on 15 July 2010, and the most recent, performed by the cellist Alisa Weilerstein and the Staatskapelle Berlin, was released through Decca Records on October 30, 2012.
