= Gross (surname) =

Gross or Groß is a surname. Under German orthographic rules, the correct spelling of the surname in German is Groß. In Switzerland, the name is spelled Gross. Some Germans and Austrians also use the spelling with "ss" instead of "ß".

It is a surname of German, Prussian, and Yiddish (Ashkenazi Jewish) origin. The word means "big", "tall" or "great", and was likely adopted in Europe over the 15th to 19th centuries during the times of the House of Habsburg when monarchs of the royal families (Emperor or Empress) were called "the Great" (der Große). Descendants of this House may have adopted the name Gross from their ancestors.

German-speaking Christian hymns use references to Jesus as "Mein Herr ist Groß" (My Lord is Great) or "So Groß ist der Herr" (So Great is the Lord). Composer Franz Schubert (1797–1828) wrote several songs referring to Jesus or God as groß, such as D 757, a quartet called "Gott in der Natur" (Groß ist der Herr!) in 1822 and D 852, "Die Allmacht" (Groß ist Jehova, der Herr) in 1825.

== People with this surname ==
- Al Gross (born 1962), American politician
- Alfred J. Gross (1918–2000), American inventor
- Andrew Gross (1952–2025), American author of thriller novels
- Andy Gross (born 1968), American magician and racquetball player
- Arye Gross (born 1960), American actor
- Avrum Gross (1936–2018), American lawyer
- Benedict Gross (1950–2025), American mathematician
- Bill H. Gross (born 1944), American financial manager and author
- Bill T. Gross (born 1958), American businessman
- Bob Gross (born 1953), American basketball player
- Chaim Gross (1904–1991), American sculptor and educator
- Charles Gross (1934–2026), American composer
- Charles G. Gross (1936–2019), American neuroscientist and psychologist
- Charles P. Gross (1889–1975), United States Army officer
- Christian Gross (born 1954), Swiss football player and manager
- Christian Groß (born 1989), German footballer
- Dave Gross, American game designer, magazine editor, and novelist
- David Gross (born 1941), American scientist and Nobel prize winner
- David A. Gross (born 1954), American diplomat
- David L. Gross, American historian
- David Gross (producer), Canadian film producer
- Ella Gross (born 2008), American singer, model, actress
- Ernest Gross (footballer) (1902–1986), French footballer
- Ernest A. Gross (1906–1999), American diplomat and lawyer
- Evgeni Gross (1897–1972), Soviet scientist
- Feliks Gross (1906–2006), Polish-American sociologist
- Frank Gross (1919–2006), Canadian philanthropist
- Gabe Gross (born 1979), American baseball player
- Garry Gross, American photographer
- George Gross (journalist) (1923–2008), Canadian sport journalist
- George Gross (American football) (1941–2010), American football player
- George Gross (water polo) (born 1952), Canadian water polo player
- Grete Gross (born 1890), Russian-German artist
- H. R. Gross (1899–1987), American politician
- Halley Gross (born 1985), American screenwriter and actress
- Hannah Gross (born 1990), Canadian actress
- Hans Georg Friedrich Groß (1860–1924), German Empire balloonist and airship constructor
- Hans Gross (Groß, Grosz) (1847–1915), Austrian lawyer and forensic scientist
- Heinrich Gross (1915–2005), Austrian Nazi doctor
- Heinrich Gross (rabbi) (1835–1910), German rabbi
- Helen Gross (1896–unknown), American blues singer
- Henry Gross (born 1951), American singer-songwriter
- Herbert Gross (1929–2020), American mathematician
- Irma Hannah Gross (1892–1980), American home economist
- Izidor Gross (1866–1942), Croatian chess master and hazzan
- Jackson Gross (born 1978), Aruban football player
- Jacob Gross (1840–1918), American politician from Illinois
- Jacob Gross (1819–1899), German-American piano maker
- Jacob A. Gross (1842–1887), American politician from New York
- James A. Gross, American labor law expert
- James Gross, American psychologist
- Jan T. Gross (born 1947), Polish-American historian
- Jenny Groß (born 1986), German politician
- John Gross (1935–2011), British author, editor and critic
- Jordan Gross (born 1980), American football player
- Jost Gross (1946–2005), Swiss politician
- Julie Gross (born 1957), Australian basketball player
- Karl Groß (disambiguation), multiple people
- Kenneth I. Gross (1938–2017), American mathematician
- Kevin Gross (born 1961), American baseball player
- Kip Gross (born 1964), American baseball player
- Lance Gross (born 1981), American actor and model
- Larry Gross, American screenwriter
- Luke Gross (born 1969), American rugby player
- M. Louise Gross (1884–1951), American activist
- Manuela Groß (born 1957), German figure skater
- Marjorie Gross (1956–1996), Canadian television writer and producer
- Mark Gross (born 1966), American musician
- Mark Gross (born 1965), American mathematician
- Mary Gross (born 1953), American actress and comedian
- Mason W. Gross (1911–1977), American university president
- Matthias Gross (born 1969), German social scientist
- Maurice Gross (1934–2001), French linguist
- Michael Gross (disambiguation), multiple people
- Michael Groß, German politician
- Michael Groß, German swimmer
- Milt Gross (1895–1953), American comics artist
- Mimi Gross (born 1940), American artist
- Miriam Gross (born 1939), British editor, journalist and writer
- Mirjana Gross (1922–2012), Croatian historian and writer
- Morris Gross, American sports coach
- Neil Gross (born 1971), American sociologist and academic
- Nikolaus Gross (1898–1945), German anti-Nazi activist
- Otto Gross (1877–1920), Austrian psychoanalyst
- Pascal Groß (born 1991), German footballer
- Paul Gross (born 1959), Canadian actor
- Pete Gross, American sports announcer
- Philip Gross (born 1952), English poet
- Ricco Groß (born 1970), German biathlete
- Rita Gross (1943–2015), American educator, writer, and theologian
- Robert A. Gross (1927–2018), American physicist
- Robert A. Gross (born 1959), American historian and professor
- Robert Arthur Gross (1914–1983), American violinist and composer
- Robert E. Gross (1897–1961), American businessman
- Robert Edward Gross (1905–1988), American pioneering pediatric surgeon
- Roland Gross (1909–1989), American film editor
- Sam Gross, American cartoonist
- Samuel David Gross (1805–1884), American surgeon
- Sara Gross (born 1976), Canada-born British triathlete
- Stanislav Gross (1969–2015), Czech lawyer, politician and Prime Minister
- Susanna Gross (died 2025), English newspaper editor, bridge player and bridge columnist
- Terry Gross (born 1951), American radio personality
- Tom Gross, journalist and political commentator
- Tyronne Gross (born 1983), American football player
- Walter Gross (disambiguation), multiple people
- Yoram Gross (1926–2015), Polish–Australian film producer

== Fictional characters ==
- Dr. Gross, a character in the Adventure Time miniseries "Islands"
- Dr Gröss, a character in Faces of Death and its sequels. It can also refer to Heinrich Gross

== See also ==
- List of people known as "the Great"
- Goss (surname)
- Gosse, a surname
- Groce, a surname
- Gros (disambiguation)
- Grosz (disambiguation)
- Kross (disambiguation)
