= Grose (surname) =

Grose is a surname of two possible origins. Cornish origin: a toponymic surname for a person who lived near a stone cross, from Cornish "crows" or "crous" for "cross". French origin: from Old French gros: "big, "fat", a variant of surname Gros.

Notable people with the surname include:

- Brent Grose (born 1979), Australian rugby player
- Daniel Grose (1903–1971), English cricketer and Army officer
- David Grose (1944–2004), American archaeologist
- Francis Grose (1731–1791), English antiquary and lexicographer
- Francis Grose (Lieutenant-Governor) (c. 1754 –1814), Lieutenant-Governor of New South Wales
- George Richmond Grose (1869–1953), American Methodist bishop
- Ingebrikt Grose (1862–1939), first president of Concordia College
- Ivan Grose (born 1928), Canadian businessman and politician
- John Henry Grose, British traveller
- Nash Grose (1740–1814), English judge
- Walter Grose (1862–1940), Australian politician
- William Grose (1812–1900), American lawyer

== Fictional ==
- Mrs Grose, a housekeeper in Henry James's novella The Turn of the Screw
