= Robert Gross =

Robert Gross may refer to:

- Robert A. Gross (historian), American historian
- Robert A. Gross (physicist) (1927–2018), American physicist and engineering scientist
- Robert Arthur Gross (1914–1983), American violinist and composer
- Robert E. Gross (businessman) (1897–1961), businessman in the field of aviation
- Robert Edward Gross (1905–1988), pioneering pediatric cardiothoracic surgeon
- Bob Gross (born 1953), retired professional basketball player
