= David Gross (disambiguation) =

David Gross is an American theoretical physicist.

David Gross may also refer to:

- David Gross (producer), Canadian film producer
- David A. Gross (born 1954), American diplomat
- David L. Gross, American historian
- Dave Gross, game designer
