= Grosu =

Grosu or Grossu is a Romanian surname that may refer to:

- Alexandru A. Grosu, Moldovan footballer
- Alexandru Sergiu Grosu, Moldovan footballer
- Alina Grosu, Ukrainian child singer
- Anca Grosu (born 1962), Romanian-German radiation oncologist
- Aneta Grosu, Moldovan journalist
- Eduard Grosu, Moldovan footballer
- Gheorghe Grosu, Romanian politician
- Gurie Grosu, Bessarabian priest and the first Metropolitan of Bessarabia
- Lora Grosu, Moldovan politician
- Nicolae Grosu, Bessarabian politician
- Maria Cristina Grosu-Mazilu, Romanian long-distance runner
- Nicole Valéry Grossu, Romanian writer
- Semion Grossu, Moldovan politician
- Sergiu Grossu, Bessarabian-born Romanian writer and theologian

== See also ==
- Groși (disambiguation)
- Groșii (disambiguation)
- Groșani (disambiguation)
- Groș (disambiguation)
