= Groszek (surname) =

Groszek is a Polish and Yiddish (Polish Jewish) surname. The word (among other meanings) is a diminutive of grosz, a Polish lesser coin. Therefore, the surname may be an occupational surname for a person dealing with money or a nickname for a wealthy or greedy person.

Notable people with the surname include:

- Jerzy Groszek (1929–2018), Polish scoutmaster and teacher
- Marcia Groszek, American mathematician
- Mieczysław Groszek (born 1951), Polish banker and economist
