= Groșani =

Groşani may refer to several villages in Romania:

- Groşani, a village in Poienarii de Muscel Commune, Argeș County
- Groşani, a village in Costești Commune, Buzău County
- Groşani, a village in the town of Slănic, Prahova County

== See also ==
- Groși (disambiguation)
- Groș (disambiguation)
- Groșii (disambiguation)
- Grosu
