= Kross =

Kross may refer to:

- Kross (surname)
- Kross (KDE), scripting framework for KDE 4
- Kris Kross, American teenage rap duo
- Kross SA, Polish bicycle manufacturer

== See also ==
- Gross (disambiguation)
