= Grosh (surname) =

Grosh is a surname of several possible origins. It may be an Americanized spelling of Slavic and Germanic surnames derived from nicknames meaning "groschen". As such it may be either an occupational surname of a moneyer, money lender or money changer, or a nickname of a wealthy or greedy person. It may also be derived from the Ukrainian surname Groshok, or the Russian surname.

Notable people with this surname include:

- Aaron B. Grosh (1803–1884), American Universalist minister and a founder of the Grange advocacy group
- Richard J. Grosh (born 1927), American academic in mechanical engineering, president of Rensselaer Polytechnic Institute 1971–1976

== See also ==
- Grosz (surname)
