= Gross =

Gross may refer to:

== Finance ==
- Gross Cash Registers, a defunct UK company with a high profile in the 1970s
- Gross (economics), is the total income before deducting expenses

== Science and measurement ==
- Gross (unit), a counting unit equal to 144 items
- Gross weight
- Gross heating value, see Heat of combustion

== Places ==
- Gross, Illinois, an unincorporated community
- Gross, Kansas, an unincorporated community
- Gross mine, a gold mine in Russia
- Gross, Nebraska, a village
- Gross Hills, Ellsworth Land, Antarctica
- 33800 Gross, an asteroid

== Other uses ==
- Gross (surname)
- G.R.O.S.S. (Get Rid Of Slimy GirlS), a recurring element in the comic Calvin and Hobbes
- In golf, the gross score is the number of strokes taken before accounting for any handicap allowances
- "In gross", legally associated with a legal person as opposed to a piece of land; as in:
  - Easement in gross as opposed to easement appurtenant
  - Hereditary in gross service, as opposed to serjeanty
  - Profit in gross as opposed to profit appurtenant
  - Villein in gross (tied to the lord) as opposed to villein regardant (tied to the manor)
  - Gross domestic product
  - Gross national income

== See also ==
- Gros (disambiguation)
- Grosz (disambiguation)
