= Violin Concerto (Sessions) =

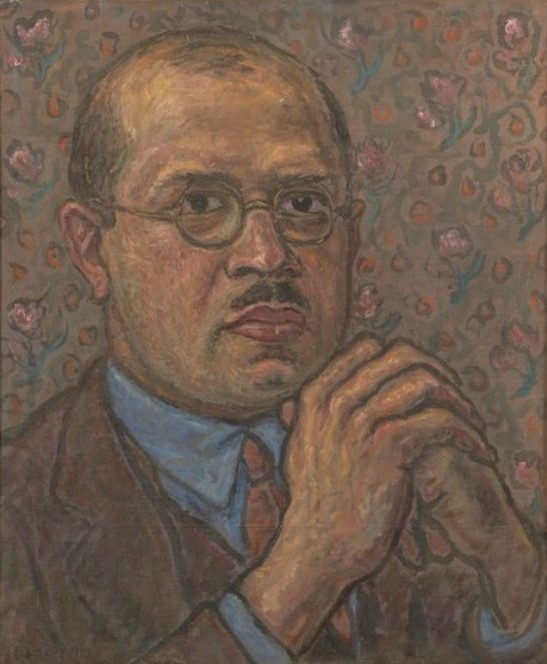
Portrait of Roger Sessions by Harold Weston (c. 1920s)

Roger Sessions' Violin Concerto was composed between 1927 and 1935, and is scored for violin and orchestra (without violins).

== History ==
The violin concerto was begun, at the suggestion of Serge Koussevitzky, in the summer of 1927—although the composer later postdated the beginning of this work to his years at the American Academy in Rome in 1928 and 1929,—and was completed in 1935. It was originally meant to have been premiered by the Boston Symphony Orchestra during their 1932–33 season, with Richard Burgin as soloist, but Sessions did not finish the finale—originally to have been the third movement—in time. Ultimately deciding on a four-movement form, Sessions delivered the violin part to Burgin in the fall of 1934, while still orchestrating the last movement, and Koussevitzky agreed to program the concerto during the first half of the 1935–36 season. When Sessions expressed a preference for a better-known violinist, Burgin graciously stepped aside and Joseph Szigeti was named as the probable soloist.

The Concerto was finally completed in San Francisco in August 1935, and the premiere was scheduled to take place in November 1936, but the now-intended soloist, Albert Spalding, asked for a postponement and requested that Sessions compose a new finale. Sessions declined and released the violinist of his obligation to perform the concerto. Spalding could not master the violin part, especially the "punishingly fast" tarantella finale, and the performance was cancelled at the last minute. The concerto was finally given its first performance with a professional orchestra by Louis Krasner and the Minneapolis Symphony Orchestra, conducted by Dimitri Mitropoulos, on November 14, 1947, though an earlier performance had been given in Chicago on January 8, 1940, by Robert Arthur Gross, the WPA Illinois Symphony Orchestra, and Izler Solomon, and Gross also performed the first two movements in 1941 with the National Youth Orchestra under Leopold Stokowski.

It is dedicated to Sessions' first wife, Barbara.

The concerto's advocates have included Tossy Spivakovsky (who gave the New York premiere with Leonard Bernstein conducting in 1959); more recently, it has been performed in 1968 by David Schneider with Josef Krips conducting, and Ole Bøhn, who has made the work's second recording.

== Style and form ==
Sessions regarded his concerto as a pronounced move away from his previous neoclassical style. It marks the beginning of his characteristic, unique style featuring extended, continuously flowing sections in which ideas surface, gain clarity and definition, and then recede again into the general flow. It is in four movements:

1. Largo e tranquillo, con grande espressione (ca. 9–11 minutes) (Note: Timings from Zukofsky's and Bøhn's recordings, to give an idea of the proportions of the work.)
2. Scherzo (Allegro) (ca. 6–8 minutes)
3. Romanza (Andante) (ca. 4 minutes)
4. Molto vivace e sempre con fuoco (ca. 10–11 minutes)

The first movement opens with two motifs, a rising diatonic segment in the trombone consisting of the first five notes of the B minor scale, and a more intense, jagged line in the trumpet, in a rapidly rising and falling pattern covering a diminished eleventh. These two figures occur throughout the entire concerto, and serve to unify the whole. The third movement is joined to the finale by a cadenza for the soloist, which employs a sort of metric modulation in which the violin accelerates through a measure of thirty-seconds to a bridge passage of sextuplet thirty-seconds, entering the finale with a passage equivalent in basic pulse though not in speed with the previous movement.

== Recordings ==
- Paul Zukofsky, violin; ORTF Orchestra, Gunther Schuller, conductor. CRI Recordings (CRI US$220 LP, 1968, and CD 676, 1994.)
- Ole Bøhn, violin; Monadnock Festival Orchestra (Peterborough, New Hampshire), James Bolle, conductor. Albany Records ALB 938, 2007.
- Rolf Schulte, violin; Nordwestdeutsche Philharmonie, János Kulka conductor. Rolf Schulte / RSR (191061080589) [Download only]

== Notes and references ==
Notes

Sources

- Anon. (September 30, 1935). "Novelties Named by Koussevitzky". The New York Times. p. 12.
- Babbitt, Milton (2003). Stephen Peles (ed.). The Collected Essays of Milton Babbitt. Princeton: Princeton University Press.
- Carter, Elliot (July 1959). "Current Chronicle: New York". The Musical Quarterly. 45 (3): 375–381. doi:10.1093/mq/XLV.3.375. Reprinted as "Roger Sessions: Violin Concerto (1959)", in Elliott Carter: Collected Essays and Lectures, 1937–1995, edited by Jonathan W. Bernard, 175–180 (Rochester, New York: University of Rochester Press, 1997). ISBN 1-878822-70-5.
- Cone, Edward T.; Sessions, Roger (Spring–Summer 1966). "Conversation with Roger Sessions". Perspectives of New Music. 4 (2): 29–46. doi:10.2307/832211. JSTOR 832211.
- Harman, Carter (1968). Roger Sessions: Violin Concerto (1935) (Sleeve notes for CRI SD 220). New York: Composers Recordings.
- Henahan, Donal (July 1968). "Reviews of Records: Roger Sessions: Violin Concerto (1935). Paul Zukofsky, violin; Orchestre Philharmonique de l'Office de la Radiodiffusion-Télévision Française, cond. Gunther Schuller. Composers Recordings, CRI-220-USD (stereo or mono). Robert Moevs: Musica da Camera (1965); Variazioni Sopra una Melodia (1961). Jack Glick, viola; Robert Sylvester, cello; Contemporary Chamber Ensemble, cond. Arthur Weisberg. Ezra Sims: Third Quartet (1962). Lenox Quartet. Composers Recordings, CRI-223-USD (stereo or mono.)". The Musical Quarterly. 54 (3): 385–387. doi:10.1093/mq/LIV.3.385. JSTOR 741296.
- Olmstead, Andrea (2008). Roger Sessions: A Biography. New York: Routledge. ISBN 978-0-415-97713-5 (hardback); ISBN 978-0-415-97714-2 (pbk.); ISBN 978-0-203-93147-9 (ebook).
- Schubart, Mark A. (April 1946). "Roger Sessions: Portrait of an American Composer". The Musical Quarterly. 32 (2): 196–214. doi:10.1093/mq/XXXII.2.196.
- Sessions, Roger. 1937. Violin Concerto (score). [N.p.]: Edgar Stillman-Kelly Society; New York: Affiliated Music Corporation. Reprinted, New York: E. B. Marks Music, 1959. Reprinted, Boca Raton, Florida: Masters Music, 2001.
- Steinberg, Michael (2000). The Concerto: A Listener's Guide. Oxford University Press. ISBN 9780198026341.
- Winn, Steven (October 28, 2005). "David Schneider, longtime violinist with the San Francisco Symphony". San Francisco Chronicle.
