= Groșii =

Groșii may refer to several places in Romania:

- Groșii Noi, a village in Bârzava Commune, Arad County
- Groșii Țibleșului, a commune in Maramureș County

== See also ==
- Groși (disambiguation)
- Groș (disambiguation)
- Groșani (disambiguation)
- Grosu
