= Groși (disambiguation) =

Groși is a commune in Maramureș County, Romania.

Groşi may also refer to several other places in Romania:

- Groşi, a village in Ceru-Băcăinți Commune, Alba County
- Groşi, a village in Vârfurile Commune, Arad County
- Groşi, a village in Băbana Commune, Argeș County
- Groşi, a village in Aușeu Commune, Bihor County
- Groşi, a village in Brusturi Commune, Neamţ County
- Groşi, a village in Margina Commune, Timiș County
- Groşi, a village in Cernișoara Commune, Vâlcea County

== See also ==
- Groș (disambiguation)
- Groșii (disambiguation)
- Groșani (disambiguation)
- Grosu
