= Hennegen Bates Company =

Jeweler in Baltimore, Maryland, US from 1857 to 1955

Hennegen Bates Company was a jeweler and silversmith in Baltimore, Maryland, also known as Hennegan, Bates & Company and Hennegan-Bates Company. The company existed from 1857 to about 1955.

== History ==
The business originally began in Wheeling, West Virginia, by James T. Scott in 1857 who went to Wheeling from Huntington, Pennsylvania. The firm soon became known as James T. Scott & Company doing a wholesale and retail business. In 1859, William H. Hennegen, a native of Rochester, New York went to Wheeling from St. Louis, Missouri and soon became a partner with James Scott. In 1864, Hennegan opened a wholesale branch of the company in Pittsburgh, Pennsylvania, that soon became known as Scott & Hennegen. The partnership between Scott & Hennegen was dissolved 1869 with Hennegen taking over the Wheeling business and Scott taking over the Pittsburgh business with G. B. Barrett. The Pittsburgh business became known as Scott, Barrett & Company. The Wheeling business kept by Hennegen was joined by James O. Bates in 1886 and John D. Reynolds in 1869.

In 1874, Hennegen and Reynolds opened a store on Baltimore Street in Baltimore, Maryland, while Bates continued to operate the main location in Wheeling. The Wheeling business was later sold to Jacob W. Grubb. The Wholesale operations ran for a number of years but were eventually discontinued and the business became retail only. The enterprise was eventually incorporated in 1899 with Hennegen becoming President, Bates Vice-President and Mr. Reynolds, secretary-treasurer. Hennegen died a short time later in June 1901, and Bates became the leader of the business. The business was burnt to the ground during the Great Baltimore Fire in 1904. Only the store's massive fire-proof safe survived. The business was rebuilt.

When Bates died in 1914, Reynolds became the chief executive. The business was later joined by C. Howard Millikin as vice president and Andrew L. Warner as secretary treasurer.

== See also ==
- Stieff Silver
- Schofield silver
