= Sam Kirk (disambiguation) =

Sam Kirk (born 1981; as Samantha Kirk) is an American artist.

Sam, Samuel or Samantha Kirk may also refer to:

== People ==
- Samuel Kirk (psychologist) (1904–1996), American psychologist
- Samuel Kirk (silversmith) (1793–1872), American silversmith
- Tom Kirk (rugby league) (1916–1994; born Albert Samuel Kirk), Australian rugby league player
- Robert Samuel Kirk, honoured at the British 2019 Birthday Honours

== Fictional characters ==
- George Samuel Kirk, Jr. (Star Trek), older brother of James T. Kirk, known as "Sam"
- George Samuel Kirk, Sr. (Star Trek), father of James T. Kirk and Sam Kirk

== Other uses ==
- Samuel Kirk & Sons; a U.S. silverware company established by Samuel Kirk (silversmith)
