= Gros (surname) =

The surname Gros may have several origins. In French, it is a nickname for a big, fat person. Likewise, in Romanian, Groș is a word for "large". In several languages, it is a spelling variant of the German surname Gross. See also Legros.

Notable people with this surname include:

- Sara Gros Aspiroz (born 1983), Spanish ski mountaineer
- Antoine-Jean Gros (1771–1835), French painter
- Brigitte Gros (1925–1985), French journalist and politician
- Daniel Gros (born 1955), German economist
- Jean-Baptiste Louis Gros (1793–1870), French ambassador and daguerreotypist
- Jules Gros (1890–1992), Breton linguist
- Jules Gros (journalist) (1829-1891), French journalist
- Louis Prosper Gros (1893–1973), French aviator
- Piet Gros (born 1964), Dutch chemist
- Timo Gros (born 1992), German politician
