= Jacob Gross =

Jacob Gross may refer to:

- Jacob Gross (piano maker), German piano maker
- Jacob Gross (Illinois politician), German American businessman and politician
- Jacob A. Gross, American lawyer and politician from New York.
- Jack J. Gross, or Jacob Jerome Gross, film and television producer
