= Stieff Silver =

Silver company in Baltimore, Maryland, United States

Kirk-Stieff
- Formerly: The Baltimore Sterling Silver Manufacturing Company (before 1895); Baltimore Sterling Silver Company (1895-1904); The Stieff Company (1904-1979)
- Industry: silversmithing
- Founded: 1904
- Founder: Charles Clinton Stieff and partners
- Defunct: 1990
- Fate: Acquired by Lenox; Kirk-Steiff continued as a brand of first Lenox and, since 2007, Lifetime Brands
- Headquarters: Baltimore, Maryland, United States

The Stieff Company is a silverware company located in Baltimore, Maryland. It has also been known as Kirk-Stieff since 1979.

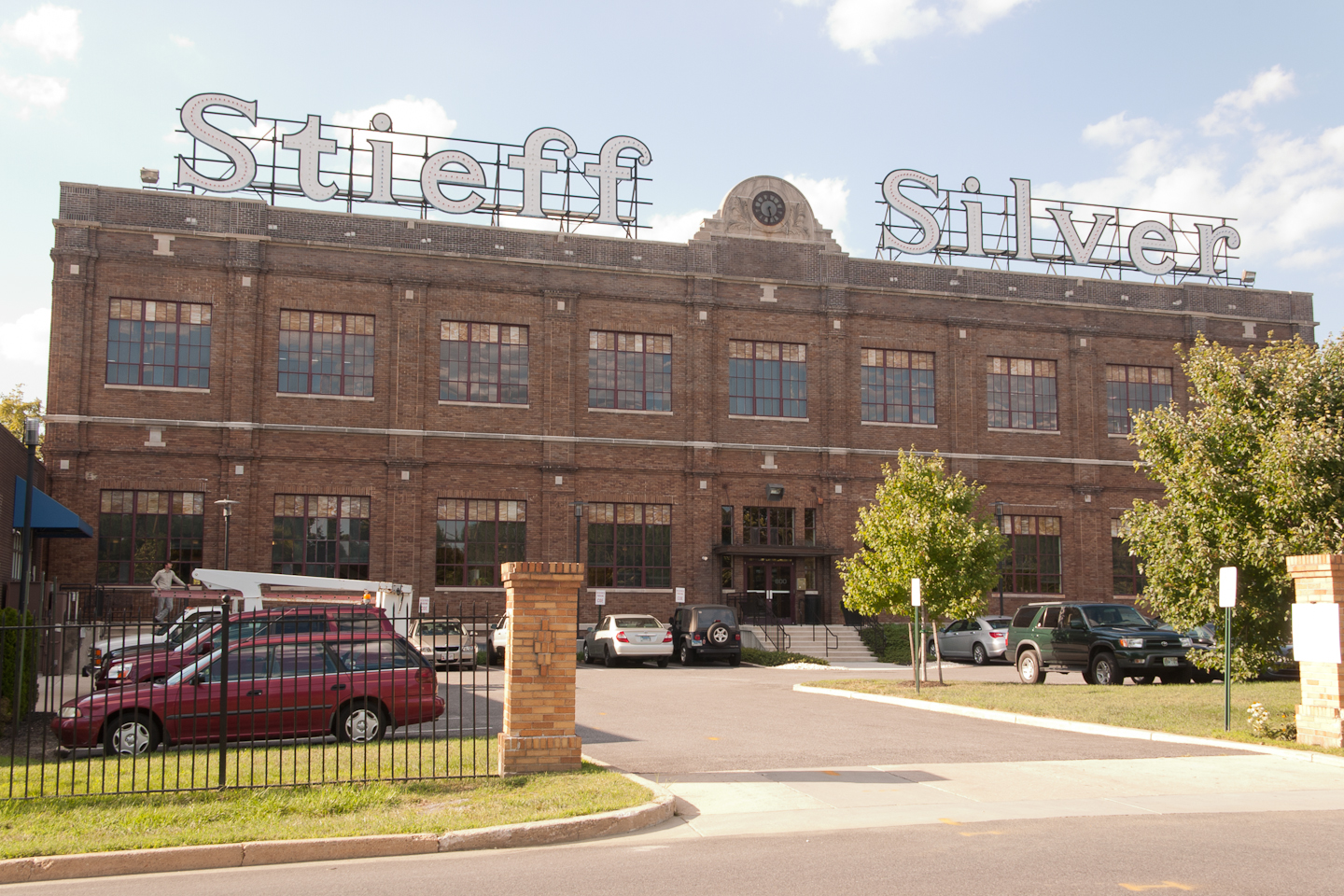
Stieff Silver Company Factory in Baltimore, Maryland

== History ==
Charles Clinton Stieff was the grandson of Baltimore piano maker Charles M. Stieff. Charles C. and partners created the Florence Silver Company on December 2, 1892, shortly after the financial failure of the Klank Manufacturing Company. George Klank was a Baltimore silversmith who had been a part of Klank & Bro. silversmiths. On his own, his new firm lasted only 10 months. Upon the failure of the business, Charles C. Stieff was named as the receiver. He and partners revived the business with great success. The original name lasted less than a year, with a name change to the Baltimore Sterling Silver Manufacturing Company. By 1895, the name was shortened to the Baltimore Sterling Silver Company.

June 1904 brought the buyout of the partners and a final name change to the Stieff Company. Early operations were on West Fayette Street in Baltimore. A few years at Cider Alley in Baltimore, and later in a Stieff-owned building on German Street (changed to Redwood Street during World War I). Longtime showrooms were located at 17 N. Liberty Street in Baltimore (aka 17 McLane Place shortly after the Great Baltimore Fire). The Stieff Company cut out the middleman by manufacturing their own silver and retailing it in the early years in their own stores and by mail order. This allowed them to offer a high-quality product at value pricing.

Charles C. Stieff handed the reins of the company to his son Gideon Stieff in 1914. Charles died in 1923 at his desk at the Stieff offices on Redwood Street. Gideon would head the company until his death in 1970. His three sons, Charles C., Rodney and Gideon Jr., would each enter into the family business. Rodney would become President and later Chairman. Charles C. Stieff became Vice President of Sales, while the youngest brother Gideon expanded the company's retail operations into the suburbs of Baltimore, post-WW II. The three brothers remained with the company until 1990 when they sold it to Lenox.

In April 1924, a new one-story factory was completed in the Hampden section of Baltimore. The factory at 800 Wyman Park Driveway was a state-of-the-art building for making silver. Business boomed and construction of a second floor was completed in 1929. This occurred just in time for the crash of the stock market and the Great Depression. Gideon Stieff kept the factory staffed despite the economic downturn, knowing that one day when business improved, those employees would be needed again. Silversmiths swept floors, painted walls, and whatever else could be done to keep them occupied, and quickly dispatching any orders that came in. Some of the finest works were those made in the 1930s, as the silversmiths took even greater care and skill with the silver.

Starting in 1910, several large and extensive catalogs were produced by Stieff. Major catalogs were published in 1910, 1920, 1926, 1928, 1937, and 1939. These catalogs show over 1000 different items made by Stieff. Post-World War II, with the boom in suburban shopping centers and upwardly mobile clients, catalogs were made in the form of dealer/showroom binder books that could be shown to clients at the hundreds of retail stores that carried Stieff silver and pewter. Stieff was now sold in thousands of retail stores around the country. Examples of the Stieff catalogs are available free online.

The Stieff Company was known for the quality and value of its silver products, beautiful hand chasing and Repoussé work. The most famous pattern made by Stieff and introduced in June 1900 was Maryland Rose, later known as Stieff Rose. (Some sources give a 1892 date, but the dies were not cut until after Frank Schofield arrived in Balt. in 1899) Other famous patterns include Chrysanthemum, Lady Claire, Princess, Puritan, Clinton, Forget Me Not, Homewood, Betsy Patterson and Corsage. Post-World War II came Diamond Star, Personna, Rose Motif, Silver Surf, Carrollton, and Royal Dynasty. Colonial Williamsburg commissioned Stieff to create Queen Anne and Williamsburg Shell, while Smithsonian was made for the Smithsonian Institution. The two rarest patterns are Victoria and Plain; both discontinued prior to 1920. The Stieff crafters created Sterling holloware, flatware and novelty items including trophies and awards. The company thrived for generations, later moving into pewter, jewelry, and plated wares.

In 1967, Stieff bought another Baltimore silversmith, the Schofield Company, makers of sterling silver flatware and the Woodlawn Vase replica, which is the trophy given at the Preakness each year. When Stieff bought Schofield, the employees were transferred to the Stieff factory. The Schofield building was not purchased with the company and has since been torn down. The replicas of the Woodlawn Vase are now produced by a New York silversmith, through Jim Stieff. In 1977, the patterns of Schofield were discontinued. Frank Schofield had worked for Stieff for a few years around the start of the 20th century, before starting a silver business of his own. Schofield was also known as Herr-Schofield from 1905-1927.

The factory was again expanded; doubled in size in 1971 to allow for the booming pewter manufacturing business. Pewter became the major business of Stieff as sales of sterling silver waned since the 1960s. Sterling Silver holloware was made at Stieff until 1999, but pewter became the star of the company in the 1970s and 1980s.

Stieff was the official maker of pewter and sterling for the Colonial Williamsburg Foundation, the Thomas Jefferson Foundation, the Smithsonian Institution, Old Sturbridge Village and Old Newport.

== Consolidation ==
In 1979, the Stieff Company bought cross-town rival, S. Kirk & Son. As a part of the purchase agreement, the Stieffs agreed that the Kirk name would go first on the newly created company, creating Kirk-Stieff. The Kirk factory in Baltimore and a pewter factory in Salisbury, MD were closed and operations consolidated into the Stieff factory at 800 Wyman Parkway in Baltimore. The Stieff family would continue to own Kirk-Stieff for 10 more years. The patterns of each company continued to be branded with the original companies' marks, so patterns such as Corsage, Stieff Rose, Lady Claire, and the like still had the Sterling - Stieff mark. The patterns of Kirk, such as King, Repoussé, and all of the rest, were marked S. Kirk & Son. New patterns introduced by Kirk-Stieff, such as Dancing Surf, would receive the Kirk-Stieff marks. The Kirk Building on Kirk Ave. in Baltimore has since been torn down.

The Stieff family sold Kirk-Stieff in 1990 to Lenox, makers of tabletop items like flatware, china, and crystal. Lenox was a division of Brown-Forman Corp. Eventually silverware production was moved to Providence, Rhode Island, while sterling silver, holloware, and pewter would remain at the Stieff factory. Manufacturing ceased in 1999 in Baltimore, as operations were consolidated at a Lenox plant in Smithfield, Rhode Island and later to New Jersey. Today the name survives as a brand of Lifetime Brands Inc., as Lifetime bought Kirk-Stieff and other silver brands from Lenox in July 2007. The sale price was 8.775 million USD. The silver is now made in Puerto Rico, but only as Sterling Flatware (unchased). Of the Stieff patterns, only the pattern Stieff Rose is still made, and that is by "special order" and can take up to a year for delivery. Several of the Kirk patterns are still made by Lifetime Brands, at the Lifetime Brands website.

There were 75 employees when the company ceased operations at the Baltimore site.

The former Stieff factory building, built by Stieff Silver in 1924 and expanded in 1929 and 1971, is located in Baltimore, Maryland's Hampden area adjacent to Wyman Park. It was converted by Baltimore developer Struever Bros. Eccles & Rouse into an office building, but the exterior has remained unchanged. The property is now owned by another company, with adjacent property. The building is listed on the National Register of Historic Places. For many years the building had multiple tenants... used by the Johns Hopkins University, The PARK People and the Scout Shop for the Baltimore Area Council of the Boy Scouts of America. In 2017, the building was acquired by Johns Hopkins Whiting School of Engineering (The Materials Characterization and Processing facility) and has since undergone an extensive remodeling, with Johns Hopkins the sole owner and tenant.

Samuel Kirk & Son was known for its repoussé silverware, where the design was created by pushing the silver alloy from the inside. Both it and Stieff were known as prestige silversmiths. From the purchase of the Schofield Company, one of the company's best-known creations became the Woodlawn Vase, a trophy given to winners of the Preakness Stakes horse race. and The Park People.

== Further information ==
In 2009, a historic silver website was created, dedicated to the products of the former Stieff Company. This tribute site is a non-profit entity that solely serves to educate collectors about the products that the Stieff Company once made. It has the support of the Stieff family, who contribute material to the site. The Stieff Company Website is the historical record of the Stieff Company and Schofield silver products. This is an extensive research-only site, and not a commercial endeavor. There is no site dedicated to the products of S. Kirk & Son.

== See also ==
- Schofield silver
- Hennegen Bates Company
