= Thomas Bridges (dramatist and parodist) =

English writer

Thomas Bridges (c. 1710 – 1775 or later) was an English writer of parodies, drama and one novel. He was born in Hull, the son of a physician. He became a wine merchant and a partner in a banking firm.

In 1762 he published, under the pseudonym Caustic Barebones, A Travestie of Homer, a parody or burlesque translation of Homer's Iliad. The work achieved some popularity, and was reprinted several times, the last in 1797. In 1765 he wrote The Battle of the Genii, a burlesque of John Milton's Paradise Lost, which was once attributed to Francis Grose.

Bridges' only novel was The Adventures of a Bank-Note, published in 1770. He wrote two plays: Dido, a comic opera produced at the Haymarket Theatre in 1771, with music by James Hook; and The Dutchman (1775), a musical entertainment also with music by Hook.
