= James Whitford Bashford =

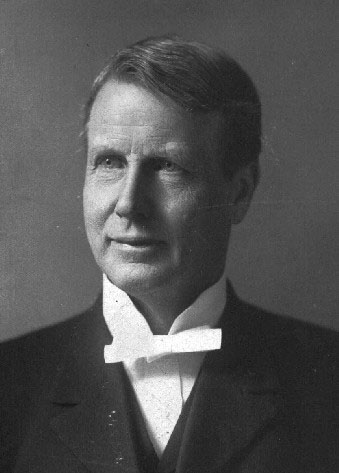
- Bishop of the Methodist Episcopal Church
- Born: May 29, 1849; Fayette, Wisconsin
- Died: March 18, 1919 (aged 69); Pasadena, California

James Whitford Bashford (traditional Chinese: 柏錫福; simplified Chinese: 柏锡福; pinyin: Bó Xīfú; Foochow Romanized: Báik Sék-hók; May 29, 1849 – March 18, 1919) was a bishop of the Methodist Episcopal Church in the United States and the first bishop of the Methodist Episcopal Church in China.

== Life ==
Bashford was born on May 29, 1849, in Fayette, Wisconsin. He received his A.B. degree from the University of Wisconsin-Madison in 1873, and in 1876 graduated from the School of Theology of Boston University. He was awarded the Ph.D. from Boston University in 1881. In 1878 he married Jane M. Field. Before he was elected the fourth president of Ohio Wesleyan University in 1889 he served as a pastor of the Methodist Episcopal Church in several places, including Boston, Massachusetts, Portland, Maine and Buffalo, New York. In 1904, Bashford was elected bishop of the Methodist Episcopal Church.

In 1904 Bashford was assigned to the mission field in China at his own request at age 55. On October 20 he arrived in Fuzhou, and in the same year he went to Shanghai where he became the first resident bishop of the Methodist Episcopal Church in China. From the summer of 1908 onwards, Bashford served in Beijing until he left China in the summer of 1918. He died in Pasadena, California, March 18, 1919.

== Religious work and influence ==
Bashford was a deep believer in the Social Gospel, which viewed the Christian mission as bringing about social change, but he saw this mission in religious terms. In 1918, as the conflict in Europe continued, he issued a statement saying that the war would be followed by a conflict of the white race on one side and the yellow and black races on the other, unless the Christian Church spread its missionary work on a vast scale in Asia and Africa.

Bashford Hall, a residence for first year students on the campus of Ohio Wesleyan University, is named in his honor.

== Selected works ==
- Bashford, James Whitford (1906). "China and Methodism" (PDF). Duke Divinity Archive.
- Bashford, James Whitford (1907). God's Missionary Plan for the World. Eaton & Mains.
- Bashford, James Whitford (1907). China Centennial Documents. Vol. 1. Board of foreign missions of the Methodist Episcopal church, Chinese centennial commission.. Includes pamphlets and writings.
- Bashford, J. W. (1916). China: An Interpretation. New York, Cincinnati: Abingdon Press.

== See also ==
- George Richmond Grose
- List of bishops of the United Methodist Church

== References and further reading ==
- Grose, George Richmond (1922). James W. Bashford, Pastor, Educator, Bishop (PDF). New York; Cincinnati: The Methodist Book concern.
- Israel, Jerry (1975). "The Missionary Catalyst: Bishop James W. Bashford and the Social Gospel in China". Methodist History. hdl:10516/3036.
