= Walter Gross =

Walter Gross may refer to:

- Walter R. Gross (1903–1974), German palaeontologist
- Walter Gross (politician) (1904–1945), German Nazi politician
- Walter Gross (actor) (1904–1989), German actor in Two Hearts in May (1958) and other films
- Walter Gross (cyclist) (born 1915), Swiss cyclist
- Walter Gross (journalist) (1911–1995), Israeli journalist of German birth
- Walter Gross (musician) (1909–1967), American songwriter

== See also ==
- Gross (surname)
