= Violin Concerto (Carter) =

The Violin Concerto is a concerto for violin and orchestra in three movements by the American composer Elliott Carter. The work was jointly commissioned by the San Francisco Symphony and the violinist Ole Bøhn. It was completed February 26, 1990, in Waccabuc, New York, and was premiered May 2, 1990, in San Francisco, with conductor Herbert Blomstedt leading Bøhn and the San Francisco Symphony. The piece won the 1994 Grammy Award for Best Classical Contemporary Composition.

== Composition ==
The Violin Concerto has a duration of roughly 26 minutes and is composed in three continuous movements:

1. Impulsivo
2. Angosciato – Tranquillo
3. Scherzando

The work is scored for solo violin and an orchestra consisting of piccolo, two flutes (2nd doubling piccolo), two oboes, cor anglais, two clarinets (2nd doubling E♭ clarinet and bass clarinet), bass clarinet, two bassoons, contrabassoon, four horns, three trumpets, three trombones, tuba, two percussionists, and strings.

== Reception ==
Reviewing the New York City premiere, Bernard Holland of The New York Times recommended the Violin Concerto, writing:

The concerto keeps the orchestra at bay by delicate orchestrations, gaps of silence and attacks of sound in little puffs. The violin spends much of the time in its highest registers, creating a penetrating timbre that reinforces the highly ornamented legato line. The combination is one of effusive ardor played against an almost Puritan reticence.

John von Rhein of the Chicago Tribune also praised the work, commenting, "Those listeners who normally find Carter's music abrasive should be pleased to discover how lyrical and flowing this music is. Its complexities compel, rather than repel, attention." Andrew Clements of The Guardian lauded the form and orchestration of the piece, writing:

The effect is of a seamless span of music that is articulated by kaleidoscopic changes of colour and textures, with a mosaic of thematic ideas in which the solo violin interacts with ensembles drawn from the orchestra, like a tapestry of chamber music in which the instrumentation is constantly changing and with the solo line weaving its way in and out of the orchestral textures as new perspectives constantly reveal themselves.
