= Kross (surname) =

Family name

Kross is a surname. It is an occupational surname for a maker of ceramic kitchenware, metonymically derived from Middle Low German krus, kros ‘pitcher’, ‘ceramic drinking vessel’. Variants: Kröss, Kress. It is also an Estonian spelling of the surname Gross.

Notable people with the surname include:

- David Kross (born 1990), German actor
- Eerik-Niiles Kross (born 1967), Estonian diplomat, politician and security advisor
- Jaan Kross (1920–2007), Estonian writer
- Kärt Kross (born 1968), Estonian actress
- Kayden Kross (born 1985), American pornographic actress
- Killer Kross (born 1985), American wrestler
