= Charles Stieff =

American industrialist and piano manufacturer

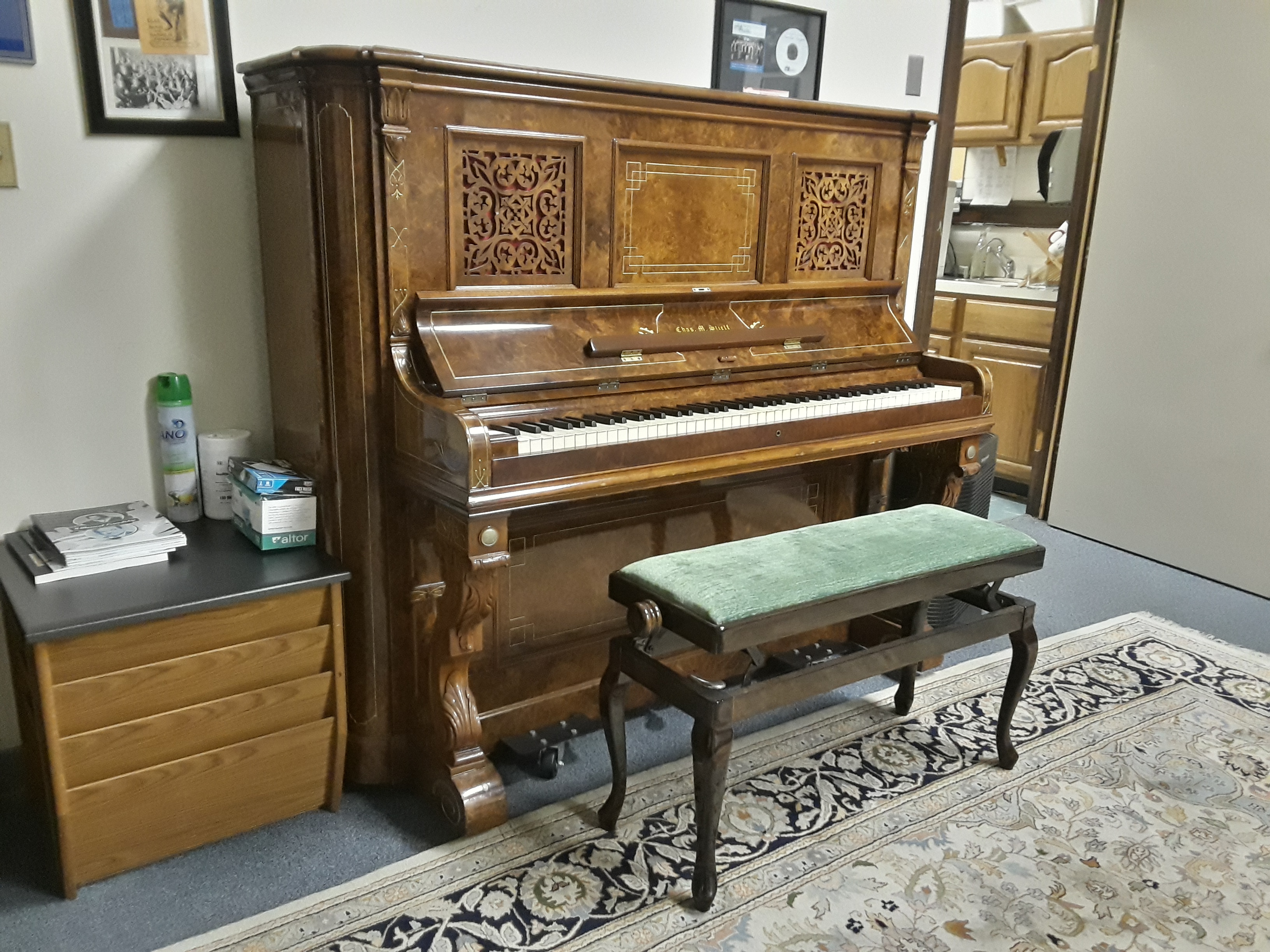
A Charles Stieff piano owned by Georgetown University

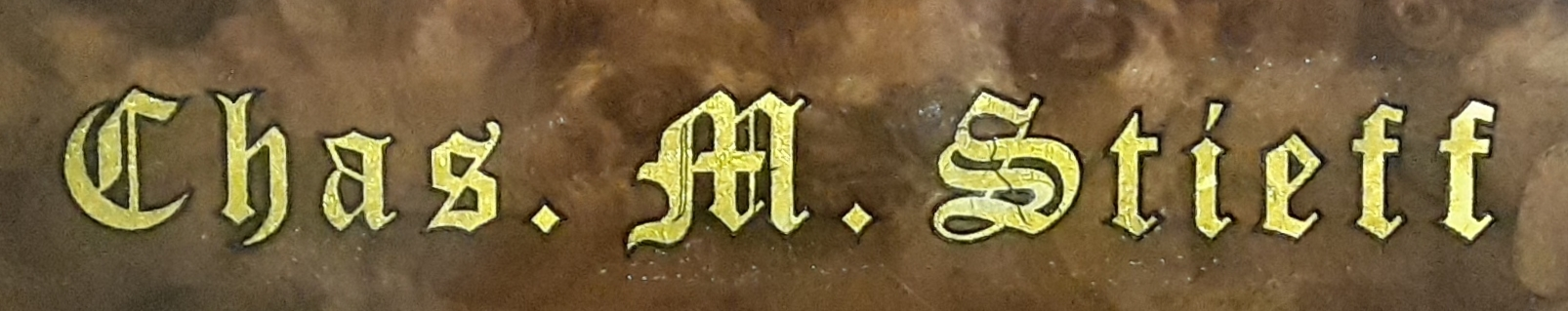
Stamped nameplate on a Stieff piano

Charles M. Stieff (1805–1862) was a 19th-century American industrialist and piano manufacturer, based in Baltimore, Maryland. Although his company went out of business in 1951, Stieff pianos are still highly regarded. They are often referred to as "The poor man's Steinway".

== Biography ==
Charles Maximilian Stieff was born in Württemberg on July 19, 1805, and was educated at Stuttgart. In 1831 he emigrated to America and settled at Baltimore, where he took a chair in Haspart's school as professor of languages and also acted as leader of a church choir. In 1842 he imported his first pianos from Germany, and opened piano warerooms on Liberty Street in 1843. Observing the success of the various piano manufacturers in Baltimore, Stieff undertook an extensive trip to Europe in 1852, studying the methods of the best piano manufacturers there. Upon his return he admitted his sons into partnership and started the manufacture of the "Stieff" piano, entrusting the management of the factory to Jacob Gross, an expert piano maker of the old school. On Christmas Day, 1860 Gross married Catharina Christiana Stieff (1833–1906), Charles' daughter. His joining the Stieff family business was an excellent combination.

The Stieff piano was considered one of the finest pianos made, superior even to the Steinway, because its piano action was made by Wessell, Nickel & Gross, "world-renowned and synonymous with the highest quality piano action that one could buy."

Charles M. Stieff died on January 1, 1862.

== His company's later years ==
After Stieff's death the business was carried on successfully by his sons, Charles and Frederick P. Stieff; the technical management of the factories being in the hands of Charles J. Gross, who was taught by his father, Jacob Gross. The factory narrowly escaped destruction during the Great Baltimore Fire of 1904 when the fire stopped just short of the factory's walls. The firm's factory was well north of the 1904 Baltimore Fire so was unaffected. The firm distributed its products through its own stores and local/regional distributors, which were found in every prominent city of the southern States, as well as at Boston, San Francisco and elsewhere. The company ceased business in 1951.

The Stieff piano company was not associated with Stieff Silver, makers of sterling silver and pewter products, which was founded by Charles C. Stieff (Charles M.'s grandson) and operated in Baltimore from 1892 to 1999.

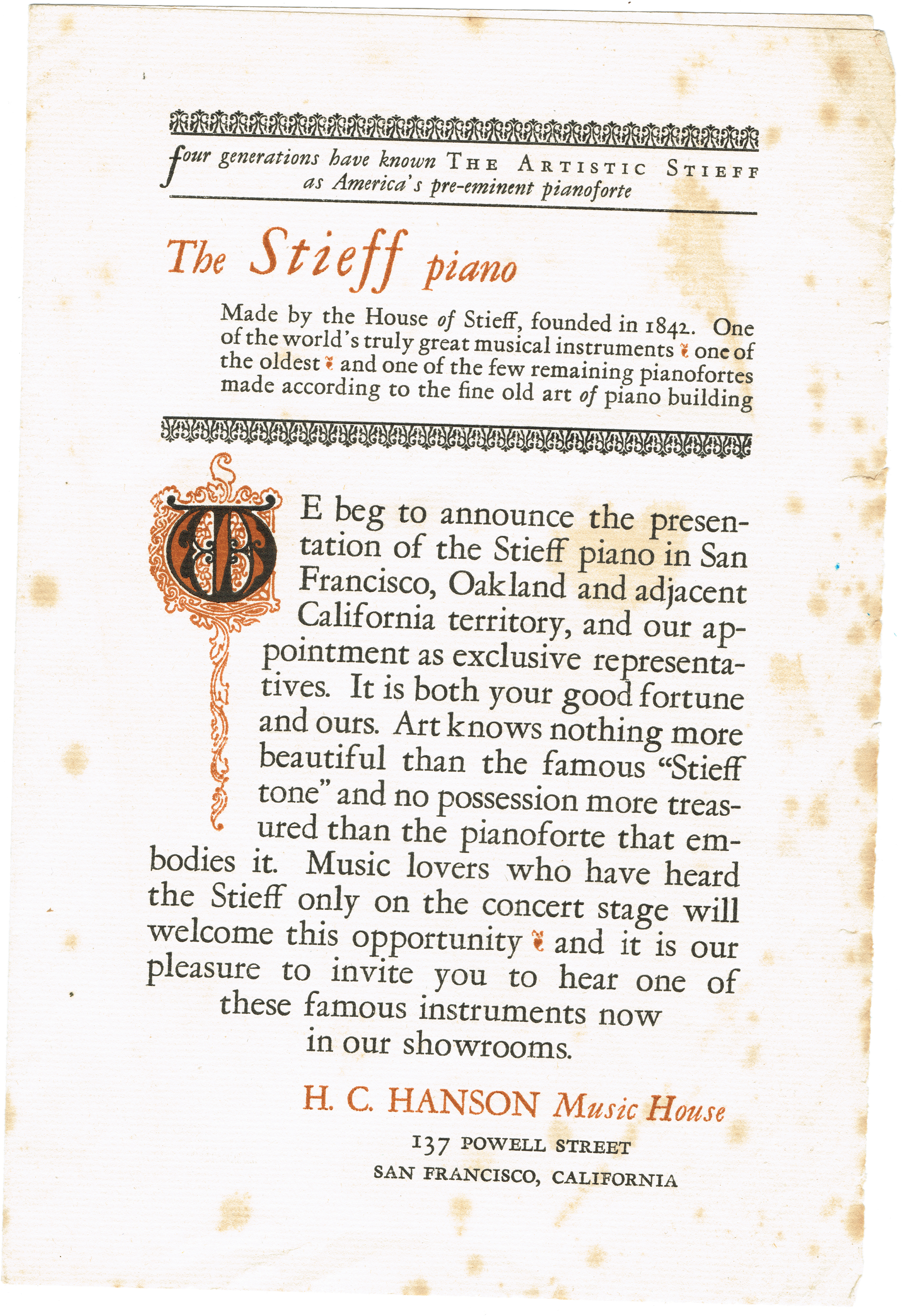
Advertising Announcement of "Exclusive representation" for sale of Stieff pianos in the San Francisco Bay area and California territories.

== Sources ==
This article is adapted from Pianos and Their Makers: a Comprehensive History of the Development of the Piano from the Monochord to the Concert Grand Player Piano, by Alfred Dolge, published in 1911 by Covina Co.
