= Ole Bøhn =

Norwegian violinist

Ole Bøhn (born 15 September 1945) is a Norwegian violinist. He was born in Oslo. He is regarded among Norway's leading violinists, and has toured in a large number of countries, in Europe, Asia and America. His repertoire includes both classical compositions and contemporary music. Among his recordings is the first performance of Elliott Carter's Violin Concerto, which won the 1994 Grammy Award for Best Classical Contemporary Composition. Among composers who have dedicated their works to Bøhn are Elliott Carter, Johan Kvandal, Niels Viggo Bentzon and Noël Lee.

Ole Bøhn was concertmaster of the Norwegian Opera from 1978 to 2012 and is professor at Sydney Conservatorium of Music since 2009.

He is awarded King Harald's medal of merit in gold.
