= Herbert Gross =

American mathematician

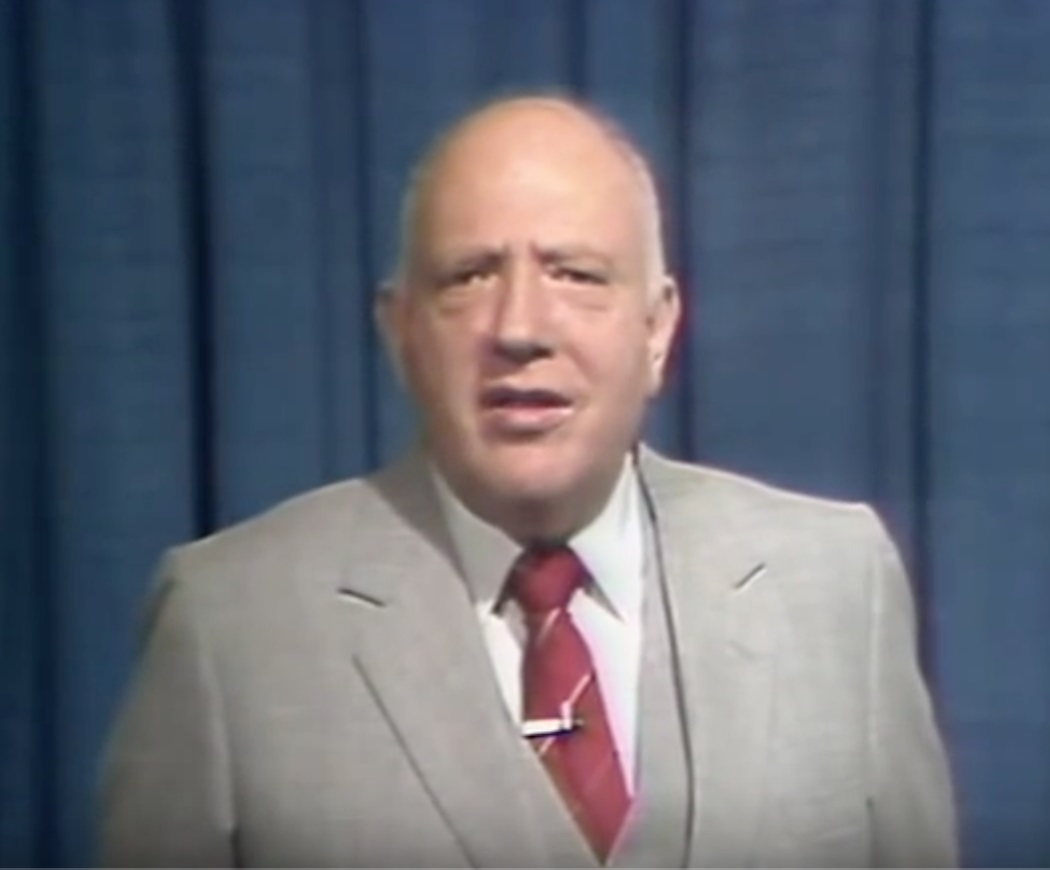
- Gross on video, Gateways to Mathematics (1985)
- Born: April 2, 1929; Boston, Massachusetts
- Died: May 27, 2020 (aged 91)
- Education: Brandeis University; Massachusetts Institute of Technology
- Known for: Mathematics education; Distance learning
- Awards: Doctor of Humane Letters by the State University of New York (2014)
- Scientific career
- Fields: Mathematics
- Workplaces: Bunker Hill Community College; Corning Community College; Massachusetts Institute of Technology
- Website: http://www.mathasasecondlanguage.org/ http://www.adjectivenounmath.com/

Herbert Irving Gross (April 2, 1929 – May 27, 2020) was an American Professor of mathematics and former senior lecturer at MIT’s Center for Advanced Engineering Study (CAES). He was best known as a pioneer in using distance learning for teaching mathematics.

== Biography ==
Gross was born in Boston MA in 1929. He studied mathematics at Brandeis University and graduated in 1953 with a B.A. in mathematics. He then attended the Massachusetts Institute of Technology as a Ph. D. candidate and a Teaching Assistant in mathematics. In 1958, prior to having completed his studies at MIT, he left to become the founding mathematics department chairperson at Corning (NY) Community College where he remained for the next ten years. During that time he became Corning’s first educational television instructor, teaching calculus to high school students in Corning’s three high schools and published his first textbook (Mathematics: A Chronicle of Human Endeavor). He left Corning in 1968 to become the Senior Lecturer at MIT's Center for Advanced Engineering Study (CAES) where, from 1968 to 1973, he produced the critically acclaimed video course “Calculus Revisited”. In 1985 he produced Classic Arithmetic Course which was videotaped and since attracted many views and is considered to be a classic. In 2011 MIT's OpenCourseWare made the course available on its website where it has become a “cult classic” because of its “archaic” black-and-white- talking-head format. It has received over a million views on YouTube. In 1973 he left MIT to become the founding Mathematics Department Chairperson at Bunker Hill (Boston MA) Community College, where he remained until his retirement in 2003. After his retirement in 2003, he continued to develop his websites while working with elementary school teachers in an attempt to help them help their students internalize mathematics better.

1974 Gross was the founding president of the American Mathematics Association of Two Year Colleges (AMATYC).

In 2014, at age 85 and under the sponsorship of Corning Inc., Gross developed a series of 40 arithmetic videos, designed to help elementary school teachers.

== Social engagement ==
Gross chose to leave MIT to be able to move into the community college and prison environment. Gross: "In terms of a way of life there was something special to me about using my method of teaching math to help mathematically at-risk adults learn to overcome their fear of math and thus increases their chances for greater upward mobility." Gross often referred to the community colleges as “the statue of liberty for those who otherwise might have been educationally disenfranchised”. Gross was lauded by the principal of the Vocational School at the Harnett Correctional Institution for his work with the prisoners and his successful “Gateways to Mathematics” course (which was subtitled “Confidence through Competence”), turning even hard-core inmates around.

== Awards and honors ==
In 2014, Gross' work was recognized by the State University of New York (SUNY), who bestowed upon him the award of Doctor of Humane Letters.

== Publications ==
- “Mathematics: A Chronicle of Human Endeavor” (1971, Holt, Rinehart and Winston)
- “Algebra By Example” (1978, D. C. Heath)
- “Gateways to Mathematics” (1983, Control Systems Engineering)
