= Andy Gross =

American athlete and entertainer

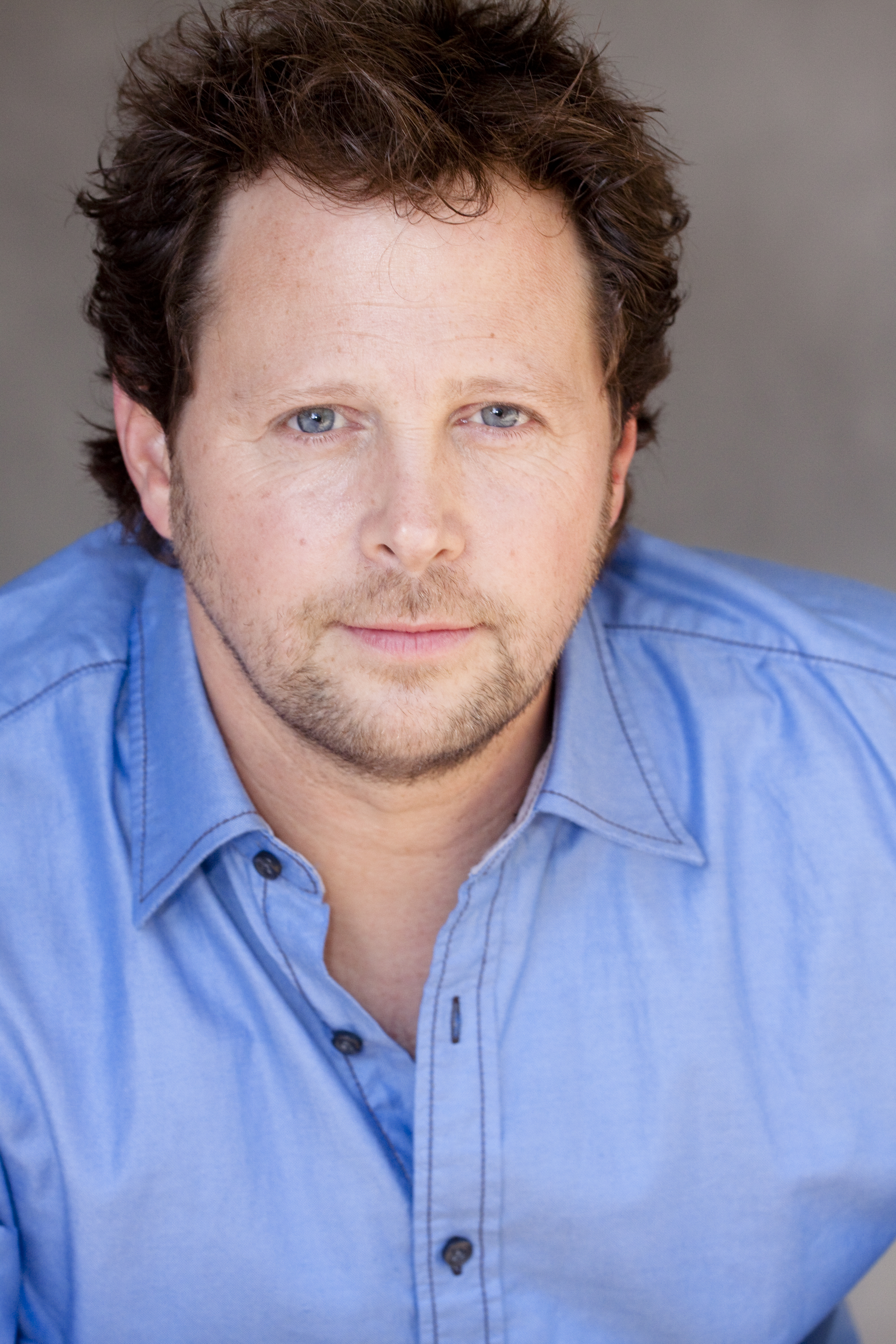
- Entertainer Andy Gross.
- Born: May 10, 1968 (age 58); St. Louis, Missouri, U.S.
- Occupations: Magician, stand-up comic, racquetball player
- Spouse(s): April Bartlett (1997-present)

Andy Gross (born Andrew Gross on May 10, 1968) is an American former professional racquetball player, now a touring comedian, ventriloquist, magician and illusionist. He is known for his television and film appearances, and for his live touring show called Andy Gross' MindBoggling Variety Show.

== Life and career ==
Gross was born in St. Louis, Missouri, to Marshall and Joan Gross, where he attended Parkway Central High School. At 15, Gross became the youngest professional racquetball player in the history of the sport, winning a record number of Southern California tournaments in the years leading up to his retirement at the age of 26.

Following his athletic career, Gross established himself as an entertainer, creating a live act that combines comedy, ventriloquism, and magic. His ventriloquism has been put to use in television series such as Beverly Hills, 90210 and Las Vegas, as well as in the sci-fi Web series After Judgment.

Since 2000, Gross has toured the United States with his MindBoggling Variety Show, which combines his comedy, magic, and ventriloquism with large-scale stage illusions. Among the more notable ventriloquist's dummy characters in the stage act is Steve, The Customer Service Guy, a soft puppet who dispenses computer repair support by telephone.

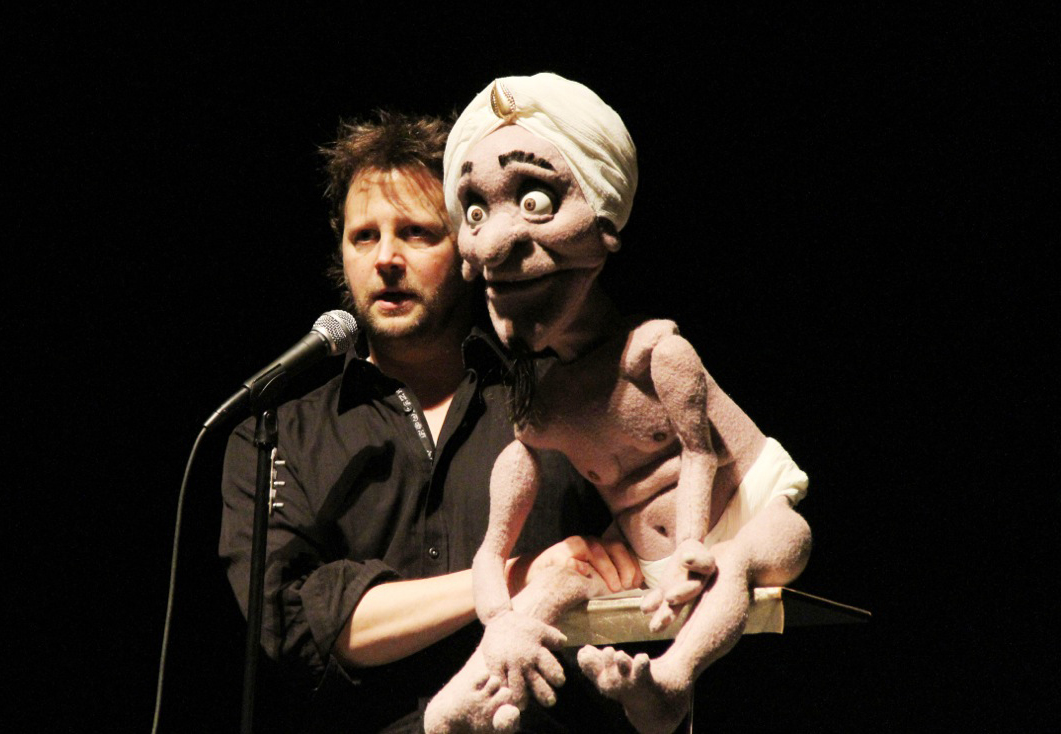
Andy Gross performing with Steve, The Customer Service Guy

In 2013, Gross created a video depicting a spin on the classic cut-in-half illusion that he dubs the "Split Man" trick, which makes it appear as though the entertainer has been severed in two but is still able to walk about. The video, shot guerrilla-style in various public places in which unsuspecting passersby are jarred by the sudden appearance of his 'Split Man', premiered on the Web before being showcased on a variety of national platforms.

Gross owns a sizeable collection of ventriloquist dummies and memorabilia, which frequently supplies props for television, film, and stage productions. Additionally, since 1997, he has designed a line of toys, prank novelties, and magic tricks, having won the Top 10 Duracell Kids Choice Award for one of his designs.

In 2018, Gross's on-stage performance at Purdue University as part of their freshman orientation week resulted in many audience members walking out, accusations of sexual harassment, and a rebuke by the university for what it called "clearly inappropriate" behavior. The university was refunded Gross' performance fee and he apologized, saying he would change his show and not perform further on college campuses.

== Filmography ==
Year	Title	Role	Notes
1990	Just the Ten of Us		
1995	Beverly Hills, 90210	Ventriloquist	Episode: "You Gotta Have Heart"
1998	The Jenny Jones Show	Self	Headline comedy special
2002	93 til Infinity	Malley	Short film
2002	Trance	Young Magician 2	Short film
2003	Las Vegas	Ventriloquist dummy	Episode: "Jokers and Fools"
2008–2009	After Judgment	Ventriloquist	Episode: "No More Time" (2008); Episode: "I Bleed for You" (2009)
2013	The Ellen DeGeneres Show	Self	
2025	Andy Gross: Are You Kidding Me?	Self	Amazon Prime special
