= Gross mine =

Gold mine in Russia

- Location: Sakha Republic, Russia
- Products: Gold

The Gross mine is one of the largest gold mines in Russia and in the world. The mine is located in Sakha Republic. The mine has estimated reserves of 8.27 million oz of gold and is being developed by Nordgold.
