= John Henry Grose =

British writer

John Henry Grose (born 24 August 1732) was a British traveller and writer affiliated with the British East India Company known for his travel account of India. He was the brother of the antiquarian Francis Grose.

Grose was born in England as the seventh son to the jeweller Francis Jacob Gross (Grose), a Swiss immigrant watchmaker.

After 1744, Grose learned accounting and record-keeping at John Bland's academy and boarding school in Bishopsgate, London. In November 1749, he was elected as a writer for the British East India Company. He went to Bombay in March 1750, to work as a servant and writer for the British East India Company and arrived there in August 1750. He is known for having written A Voyage to the East Indies, an account of his travel to India in the late Moghul period. It was first published as a single volume in 1757, expanded to two volumes in 1766, and republished in 1772. The book contains Grose's descriptions of 18th-century India, including his account of the war of 1756–63, in which the British East India Company largely eliminated France as a competitor for control of India and established the basis for British rule that lasted two centuries. In addition to Grose's account of events, the 1772 edition of his book also contains an unrelated account of a journey by John Carmichael, also of the British East India Company, from Aleppo, Syria, to Basra, Iraq.

== See also ==
- Francis Grose
