= Timo Gros =

German politician (born 1992)

Member of the Landtag of Saarland
- Incumbent
- Assumed office 9 February 2026
- Preceded by: Ute Mücklich-Heinrich

Personal details
- Born: 4 November 1992 (age 33)
- Party: Christian Democratic Union (since 2011)

Timo Philipp Gros (born 4 November 1992) is a German politician serving as a member of the Landtag of Saarland since 2026. From 2018 to 2021, he served as chairman of the Association of Christian Democratic Students in Saarland.
