= Francis Grose =

English antiquary, draughtsman, and lexicographer (c. 1731 – 1791)

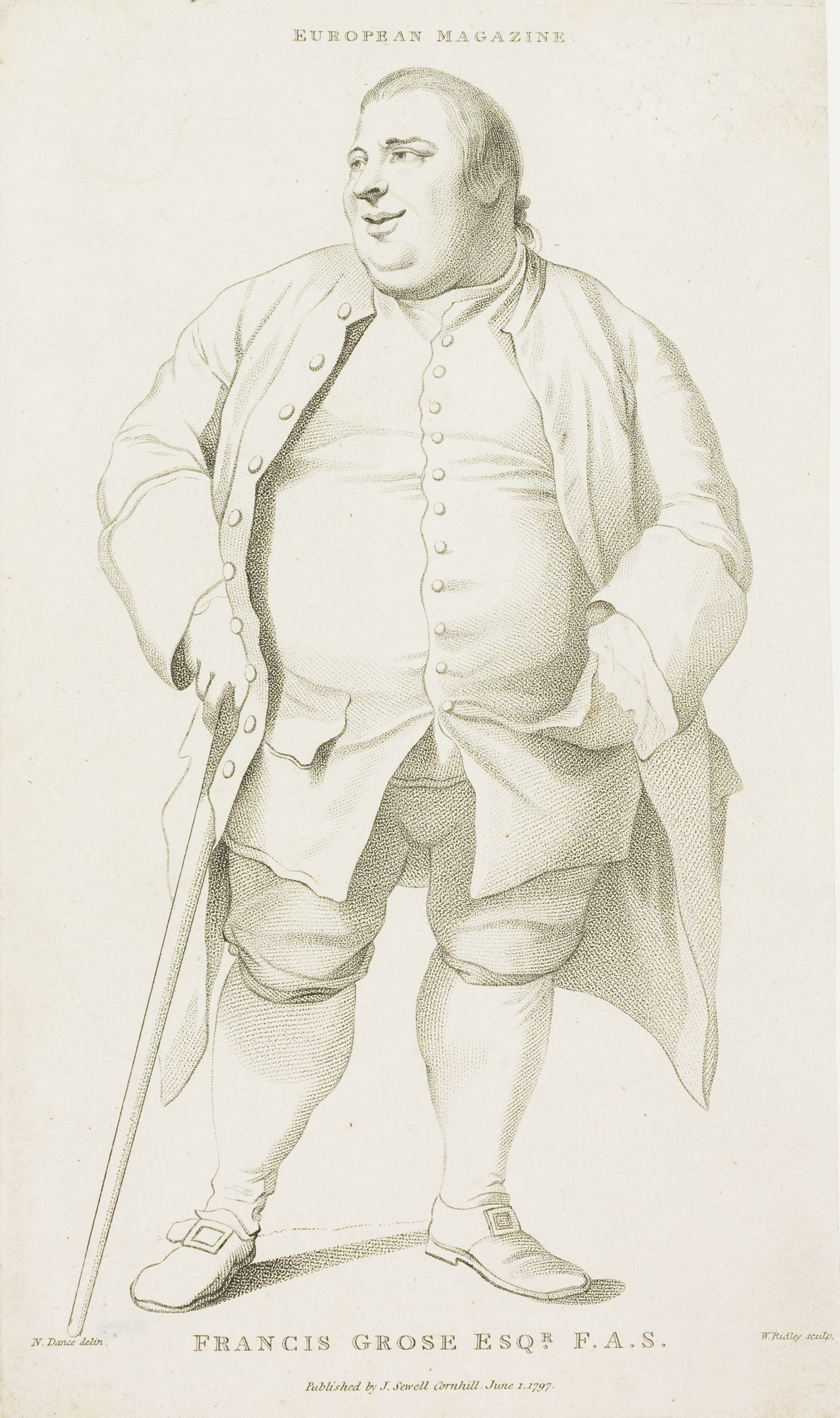
Francis Grose FSA, engraving by Francesco Bartolozzi (1787)

Francis Grose (before 11 June 1731 – 12 May 1791) was an English antiquary, draughtsman, and lexicographer. He produced A Classical Dictionary of the Vulgar Tongue (1785) and A Provincial Glossary, with a Collection of Local Proverbs, and Popular Superstitions (1787).

== Early life ==
Grose was born at his father's house in Broad Street, St-Peter-le-Poer, London. His parents were Swiss immigrant and jeweller Francis Jacob Grose (d. 1769), and his wife, Anne (d. 1773), daughter of Thomas Bennett of Greenford in Middlesex. Grose was baptised on 11 June 1731 in the parish of St Peter-le-Poer.

The eldest of seven children, Grose probably received a classical education but first aimed at a career in the Army. In 1747, he was in Flanders, apparently as a volunteer in Howard's (later 19th) regiment of foot: later he received a commission as cornet in Cobham's (later 10th) regiment of dragoons. Posted to Kent on excise duties in 1750, he met and married Catherine Jordan of Canterbury. They were eventually to have ten children, six of whom survived to adulthood. Their eldest son, also called Francis Grose, was the Lieutenant Governor of New South Wales, Australia from 1792 to 1794.

Grose left the army in October 1751, possibly to avoid his regiment's posting to Scotland. In 1755, his father bought him the post of Richmond Herald but Francis showed little interest in heraldry and was to sell it again in February 1763. In 1757, Grose was elected a member of the Society of Antiquaries, and 1759 he resumed his soldiering career, this time in the militia, which meant he could avoid distant postings. He was commissioned into the Surrey Militia as lieutenant and adjutant, and it was his subsequent promotion to captain in 1765 that led to his adoption of the familiar title "Captain Grose". The Surrey militia was disembodied in 1762 but this hardly affected Grose, who continued to receive a salary as paymaster and adjutant even in peacetime. With bequests from his parents and from his wife, who died in 1774, added to the salary he drew as a militia captain, Grose at this time was able to live reasonably well despite the demands made on his purse by the need to raise, educate and provide for his children.

== Books and publications ==
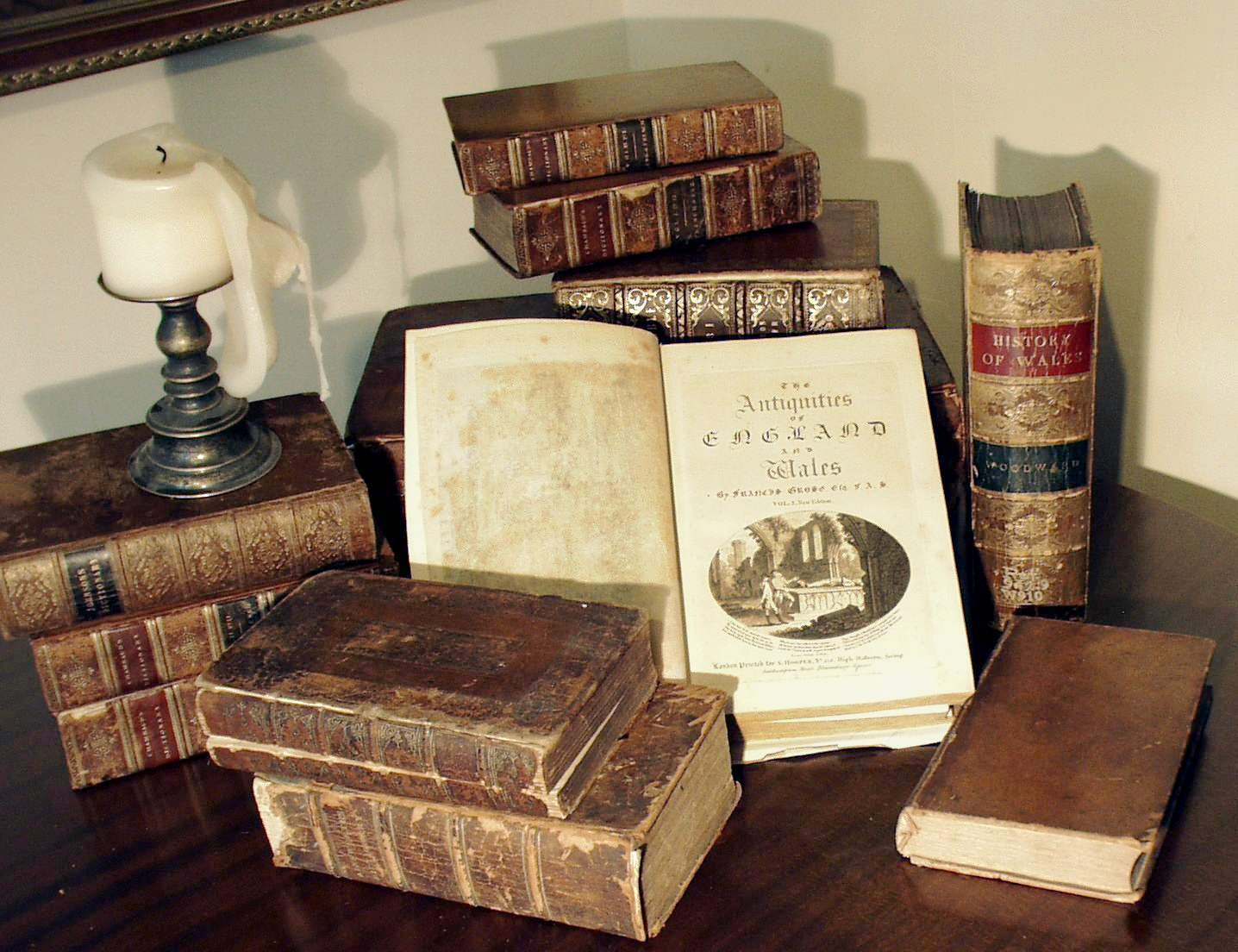
Various antiquarian books, including Grose's Antiquities of England and Wales

Grose had early on shown a keen interest in drawing, having attempted sketches of medieval buildings as far back as 1749, and having taken formal instruction at a drawing school in the mid-1750s. He was not a particularly gifted draughtsman but he mixed in the London artistic milieu and began to exhibit, first at the Society of Artists in 1767–8 and then at the Royal Academy. His interest was in the field of medieval remains, which were beginning to exercise an increasing grip on the public imagination. In 1772, he published the first part of The Antiquities of England and Wales, a work which he unashamedly aimed at the popular market. Essentially, it targeted those who wanted to know about antiquities but had neither time nor means to visit them in person, and contained small panoramas of medieval ruins, together with an informative text on a separate page. Sometimes the text was taken from books already published, or from information supplied by other antiquaries (both acknowledged); sometimes Grose collated material himself from which he could work up an article. From 1772 onwards, he also toured the country to visit and draw sites for inclusion in The Antiquities. The fourth and last volume came out in June 1776, and Grose almost immediately began work on a supplement.

His publishing career was interrupted however, when the Surrey militia was again called into service between 1778 and 1783. This was not a happy experience for him. Where previously Grose had been able to spend his summers visiting and sketching ancient sites, he was now obliged to attend his regiment in various training camps. He did not get on well with his new commanding officer, and he handled regimental finances in a slipshod manner. The result was that he incurred debts towards fellow officers that would take years to straighten out. The financial pressure forced him to increase both the rate and the range of his publications.

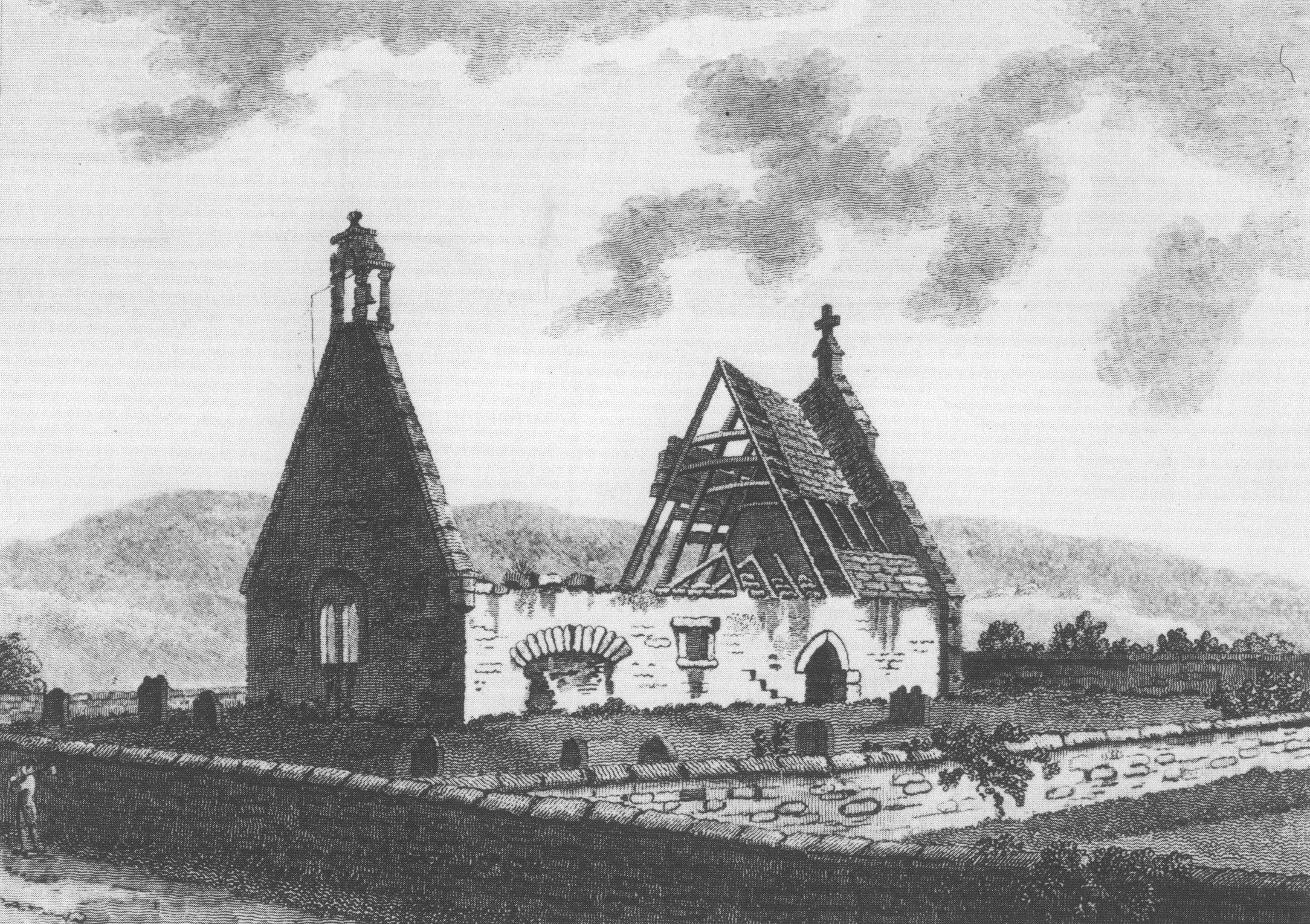
Alloway Kirk from Grose's The Antiquities of Scotland

The Supplement to The Antiquities was resumed in 1783, this time with a higher proportion of the illustrations being done by other artists. Drawing on his own fieldwork, Grose also branched out into producing dictionaries, including the famous A Classical Dictionary of the Vulgar Tongue (1785) and A Provincial Glossary, with a Collection of Local Proverbs, and Popular Superstitions (1787). Though intended to amuse, they give an unusually vivid picture of the speech of the day which would not normally find inclusion in standard dictionaries, and contained, in all, about 9,000 terms which more scholarly works of the time habitually overlooked. He produced books on military antiquities and armour, as well as satirical essays, and in 1788 began the first of several tours of Scotland in order to produce The Antiquities of Scotland. It was on the second of these tours, in summer 1789, that he met and immediately formed a friendship with the poet Robert Burns. Burns met him while he was staying with Robert Riddell at the Friar's Carse, collecting material for his Scottish work. Burns suggested to him that he should include Alloway Kirk in his Scottish Antiquities, and Grose agreed on condition that Burns provided a witch tale to go with his drawing. In June 1790, Burns sent Grose a prose tale with a variant in a letter to Grose, following it up with a rhymed version, "Tam o' Shanter".

Grose was the first art critic to affirm, in his "Rules for drawing caricaturas: with an essay on comic painting" (1788), published in William Hogarth's The Analysis of Beauty (1791 edition), that aesthetic emotions emerge from a specific "cultural" environment, and that aesthetics are neither innate nor universal, but formed by their cultural context. Grose therefore has a claim to be considered as the first critical "aesthetic regionalist theorist" in proclaiming the anti-universality of aesthetics.

== Death ==
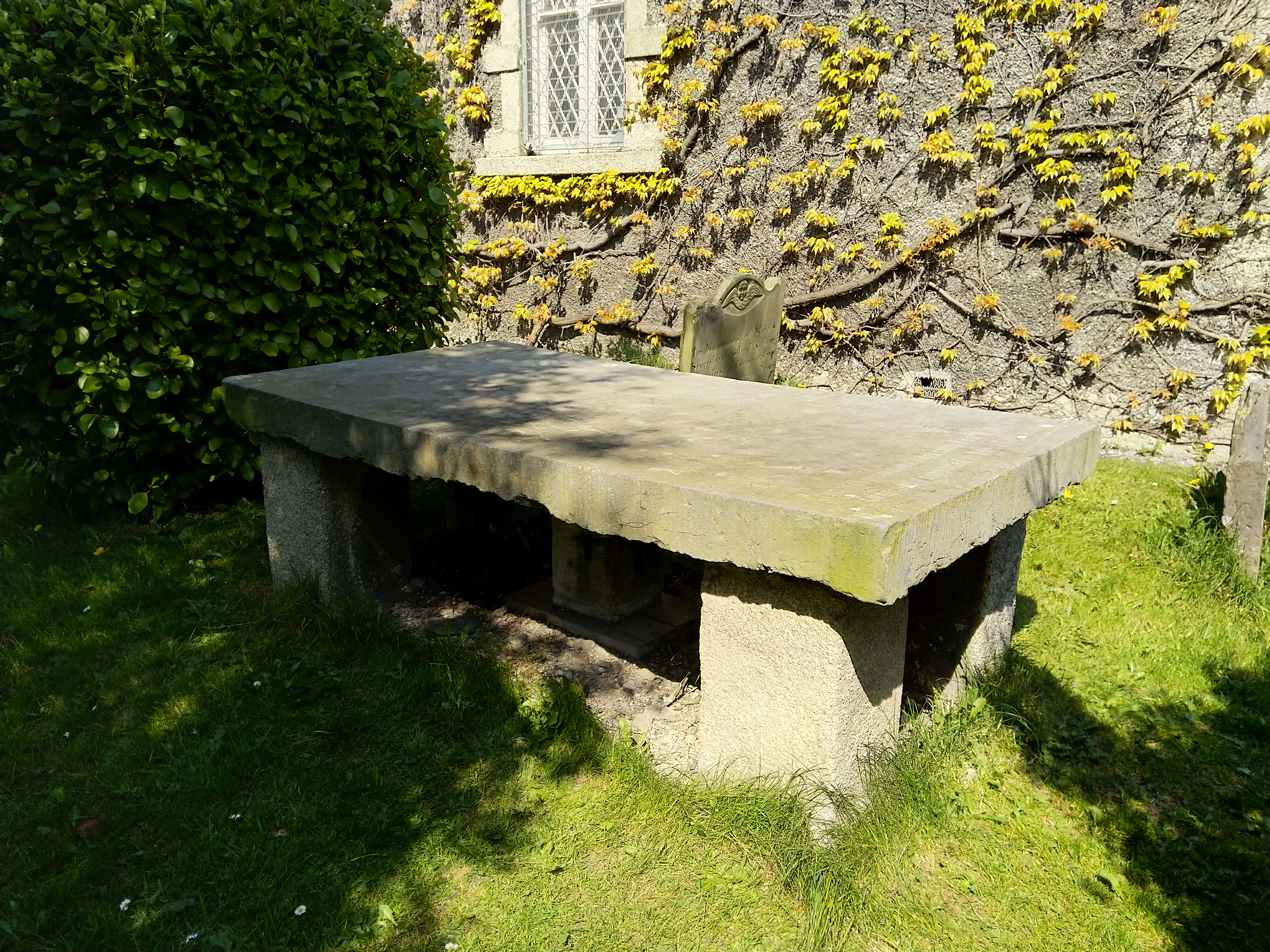
Grave of Francis Grose and James Gandon

While on an expedition to Ireland to collect antiquarian material, Grose died in Dublin at the house of Horace Hone, of an apoplectic stroke. His father had built a house, known as Richmond, in Drumcondra before his death. He was buried on 18 May 1791, at Drumcondra cemetery. His nephew Daniel and a Dr. Edward Ledwich, who had already published a book on Irish antiquities, completed the final volume of Grose's Antiquities of Ireland in 1791.

== Other works ==
In addition to the books above mentioned, Grose wrote a Treatise on Ancient Armour and Weapons.

Additionally, it is noted that he was the (anonymous) author of Advice to the Officers of the British Army: With the addition of some Hints to the Drummer and Private Soldier, which was published in 1783 as a mocking look backwards on the conduct of the war against the American colonies. Every instance of corruption, disregard and vice are suggested for every rank of the army. Tongue in cheek, but obviously rooted in truth, it is a great companion to Vulgar Tongue. It also contains a satirical portrait of Jeremiah Hodges, Grose's erstwhile commanding officer in the Surrey militia.

Two parodies by Thomas Bridges, A Travestie of Homer and The Battle of the Genii, were formerly erroneously attributed to Francis Grose.

== List of works ==
A list of works ordered by original year of the publication of the first volume:

- The Antiquities of England and Wales, vol. 1, London: S. Hooper, 1773 (new edition, 1784)
- The Antiquities of England and Wales, vol. 2, London: S. Hooper, 1774 (new edition, 1784)
- The Antiquities of England and Wales, vol. 3, London: S. Hooper, 1775 (new edition, 1783)
- The Antiquities of England and Wales, vol. 4, London: S. Hooper, 1776 (new edition, 1785)
- The Antiquities of England and Wales, vol. 5 (new ed.), London: S. Hooper, 1785
- The Antiquities of England and Wales, vol. 6 (new ed.), London: S. Hooper, 1785
- The Antiquities of England and Wales, vol. 7 (new ed.), London: S. Hooper, 1785
- Supplement to the Antiquities of England and Wales, vol. 8, London: S. Hooper, 1783 [1783]
- A Dictionary of Buckish Slang, University Wit, and Pickpocket Eloquence (and now considerably altered and enlarged, with the modern changes and improvements, by a member of the whip club), London: C. Chapel, 1811 [1785] (Project GutenBurg Edition)
- A Treatise on Ancient Armour and Weapons, Illustrated by Plates Taken from the Original Armour in the Tower of London, and Other Arsenals, Museums, and Cabinets, London: Printed for S. Hooper, No. 212 High Holborn, 1786 (supplement published in 1789)
- A Glossary of Provincial and Local Words used in England, London: John Russell Smith, 1839 [1787]
- A Provincial Glossary; with a collection of local proverbs, and popular superstitions, London: E. Jeffery, 1811 [1787]
- The Antiquities of Scotland, vol. 1, London: S. Hooper, 1797
- The Antiquities of Scotland, vol. 2, London: S. Hooper, 1797
- The Antiquities of Ireland, vol. 1, London: S. Hooper, 1797
- The Antiquities of Ireland, vol. 2, London: S. Hooper, 1797 [1791]

Others:

- Military Antiquities respecting a History of the English Army, from the Conquest to the present, vol. 1, London: S. Hooper, 1786
- Military Antiquities respecting a History of the English Army, from the Conquest to the present, vol. 2, London: T. Egerton Whitehall & G. Kearsley, 1801
- The Olio: being a collection of essays, dialogues, letters, biographical sketches, anecdotes, pieces of poetry, parodies, bon mots, epigrams, epitaphs, &c., chiefly original, London: Hooper and Wigstead, 1796
- The Antiquarian Repertory: a miscellaneous assemblage of topography, history, biography, customs, and manners. Intended to illustrate and preserve several valuable remains of old times. Chiefly compiled by, or under the direction of, Francis Grose, Thomas Astle and other eminent antiquaries, September 1807 – volume one, volume two, volume three
- Advice to the officers of the British Army, New York: Agathynian Club, 1867

== References and sources ==
Sources

- Farrant, John H. (October 2009) [September 2004]. "Grose, Francis (bap. 1731, d. 1791)". Oxford Dictionary of National Biography (online ed.). Oxford University Press. doi:10.1093/ref:odnb/11660. (Subscription, Wikipedia Library access or UK public library membership required.)
- Capt John Davis, Historical Records of the Second Royal Surrey or Eleventh Regiment of Militia, London: Marcus Ward, 1877.

== See also ==
- John Henry Grose
