= Jackson Gross =

Aruban footballer

Personal information
- Date of birth: November 4, 1978 (age 47)
- Position: Defender

International career
Years	Team	Apps	(Gls)
1996–2000	Aruba	4	(0)

Jackson Gross (born November 4, 1978) is an Aruban football player. He made four appearances on the Aruba national team from 1996 to 2000.
