= George Richmond Grose =

American academic administrator and bishop

George Richmond Grose (1869–1953) was an American academic administrator and a bishop of the Methodist Episcopal Church, elected in 1924, serving as a missionary bishop in China.

== Family ==
Grose was born on 14 July 1869 in Nicholas County, West Virginia, the eldest son of Andrew Dixon and Mary Estaline (née Harrah) Grose. His grandfather, William Grose, was a licensed exhorter in the Methodist Episcopal Church, and an earnest, forceful speaker. He was encouraged to obtain a license to preach, but he preferred to remain an exhorter and a local worker in the church.

Grose married Ohio student Lucy Dickerson of Cadiz, Ohio, on 28 June 1894. They had five children: Wilbur Dickerson, Mary Frances, Helen, William and Virginia.

== Education ==
Grose taught school for a few years in Fayette County, West Virginia, then graduated in 1894 from the Ohio Wesleyan University, Delaware, Ohio, with the degree of A.B. He went on to the Boston University School of Theology, where he earned the degrees of S.T.B. (1896) and M.A. Ohio Wesleyan awarded him the honorary doctorates D.D. in 1908 and LL.D. in 1916.

== Ordained ministry ==
Grose served as a pastor of the Cherry Valley Church, Leicester, Massachusetts from 1896 to 1897. He then went to Boston where he served for three years as the pastor in Jamaica Plain, Massachusetts. Then he was appointed to the First Methodist Church of Newtown, Massachusetts, (1900–05), then the First Methodist Church of Lynn, Massachusetts, (1905–08). Grose then accepted the pastorate of Grace Methodist Church in Baltimore (1908–12).

From Baltimore he was called to the Presidency of DePauw University, Greencastle, Indiana, in 1912. He served in this position for eleven years. During a period of growth at the university, his term as president brought stability and financial strength. He also transferred his conference membership to the North Indiana Annual Conference. He stepped down as president on his election to the episcopacy.

== Work in China ==
In 1921 he travelled to China for a year to research a biography of James Whitford Bashford. The completed work was published in 1922, as James W. Bashford, Pastor, Educator, Bishop. He returned to China in 1924 and stayed for 6 years.

== Other works ==
He was religion editor at the Pasadena Star News for over 20 years and also worked at the Long Beach Press Telegram; he also taught religious journalism at South California’s School of Religion.

== Selected works ==
- The Outlook for Religion (1913)
- Religion and the Mind (1915)
- James W Bashford - Pastor, Educator, Bishop (1922)
- The New Soul in China (1927)
- Edward Rector: a Story of the Middle West (1928)
- Browning as a contemporary: An address given to the Browning Society (1940)
- The Man From Missouri, the Story of James E. MacMurray (1943)

== See also ==
- List of bishops of the United Methodist Church
- List of Protestant missionaries in China
- Christianity in China
- 19th-century Protestant missions in China
