= Karl Groß =

Karl Groß can refer to:

- Karl Groß (footballer)
- Karl Groß (wrestler)
