= Schofield silver =

American silver company

The Schofield Company (1903–1977) (aka Herr-Schofield, aka the Baltimore Silversmiths Manufacturing Company) was a Baltimore area silver company, whose best known pattern was Baltimore Rose.

== Founder ==
Frank M. Schofield was born in 1873 to Allen and Ann (née Bradley) Schofield, in Providence, Rhode Island. (Frank Schofield was the great-great-grandson of John Schofield, an English Silversmith in London 1740–1772.)

== Background ==
In 1891, at the age of 18, Frank Schofield started an apprenticeship at The Gorham Mfg. Co. in Providence. At Gorham, Schofield learned die-cutting and silversmithing. In some silver biographies, penned by scholarly authors, it has been written that Frank Schofield cut the dies for the original Stieff Rose or, as it was known then, Maryland Rose. There may be some truth to the story as the pattern Stieff Rose debuted in June 1900 and not 1892 as generally reported. In 1899, after finishing his apprenticeship at Gorham, Frank Schofield moved to Baltimore, Maryland. Frank Schofield was employed at Baltimore Sterling Silver Company (BSSCo) at that time as a die cutter.

After working for four years for Charles C. Stieff at BSSCo (aka The Stieff Company), he struck off on his own. Founding The Baltimore Silversmiths Manufacturing Company in 1903, his first shop was on Pleasant Street in Baltimore. The city directory for 1903 shows him as a die cutter, so there is a good chance that while at BSSCo (Stieff), he did cut later dies for the Rose pattern. Frank Schofield's first pattern was Baltimore Rose, a pattern very close to Maryland Rose, made by his former employer.

In 1905, he was able to buy the failing business of long time Baltimore Silversmiths, C. Klank & Sons. Later in 1905, he partnered with businessman Henry Herr, and the company name changed to Heer-Schofield. The 1912 directories show the business at 618 Lombard in Baltimore. Henry Heer became President of the Heer-Schofield Company. Katherine Heer (his wife) became Secretary and Treasurer, and Frank, the Vice-President of the company he founded.

On June 25, 1913, Frank M. Schofield married Berthe Kline Tarbeau, a woman 14 years his junior (born 1885). Berthe would become an accomplished silversmith herself, a rarity in the day for a woman. Berthe was the daughter of circus performers with Ringling Brothers. A trapeze artist and bareback horse rider for three years in the circus, she met Frank Schofield while performing a vaudeville show at the Maryland Theater in Baltimore.

Heer-Schofield purchased the tools and dies of long time Baltimore silversmiths, Jenkins & Jenkins, in 1915, which dated back to 1871. Heer-Schofield would start using the 1871 as the founding date of the company, which was two years before Frank Schofield was born.

By 1922 Herr-Schofield was located at 308-10 St. Paul St. in Baltimore.

A 1927 catalog of flatware patterns and hollowware was produced.

After the death of Henry Heer in 1927, Frank took over the business. In 1928, the company was renamed Frank M. Schofield Co. and an updated catalog of patterns was offered.

The company, in 1930, moved to a newly built four-story building, located at the corner of Pleasant and Charles Street, in Baltimore. It was built for silversmithing and retail. The name of the company was changed again, this time to The Schofield Company.

The Schofield Company survived the depression. During WWII, they took on government contracts as most companies did.

On June 27, 1947, Frank M. Schofield died at the age of 73. He was a member of The Rotary, The Elks, St. Georges Society, the Masonic Lodge, and the Scottish Rite Temple.

After Frank Schofield's death, his wife Berthe ran the company. The Schofields owned a farm near Baltimore in Pikesville. Berthe Schofield began selling some of the property in Northwest Baltimore to support the family, as reported by Gary C Pick, great-grandson of Edmund James Pick, a former Vice President of Schofield Silver. Previously farmland, the hundreds of acres are now a larger part of what is considered Pikesville, Maryland. Gary Pick stated his family lived on the Schofield's farm briefly, to help Berthe care for it after Frank's death. Gary's father, Edmund C Pick, kept photos of riding horses and other activities on the farm.

Berthe Schofield ran the company until 1965, then sold it to a Baltimore area jeweler named Oscar Caplan. She remained with the firm as a silversmith until 1967, when the Caplans sold the company to The Stieff Company.

Berthe Schofield retired in 1967, and died on August 24, 1972, while attending a private luncheon at the Green Spring Valley Inn (Baltimore). She was 87 years old. She had called herself the world's oldest female silversmith. She and Frank had no children.

The Stieff Company continued to make Schofield's patterns until 1977. By then, the dies were wearing out and there was not enough demand to warrant new dies being cut.

Stieff purchased their major competitor, S. Kirk & Son in 1979, changing the name of the company to Kirk-Stieff Company. That business was sold to Brown-Forman (Lenox) in 1990. Lenox sold the Kirk-Stieff name to Lifetime Sterling in 2007.
