= Anca Grosu =

German radiation oncologist (born 1962)

Anca-Ligia Grosu (born 1962) is a Romanian-German radiation oncologist and professor with a research focus on the development of personalized therapy in radiation oncology. She is chair of the Radiation Oncology Department at the University Medical Center Freiburg, Germany, and member of the German National Academy of Sciences Leopoldina.

== Training and career ==
Anca Grosu attended medical school at the Medico-Pharmaceutical Institute (IMF) in Cluj-Napoca (today Iuliu Hațieganu University of Medicine and Pharmacy). She continued her medical specialist training at the Department of Neurology, Harlaching Hospital, Munich (Germany) and the Departments of Radiology / Neuroradiology and Radiation Oncology at Rechts der Isar Hospital, Technical University of Munich, obtaining her board certification in 2000 and her habilitation in 2003. Her research activities resulted in major contributions to the implementation and advancement of high precision radiation techniques such as radiosurgery and stereotactic radiotherapy. Another important focus of Grosu's research is the integration of biological and functional imaging in radiotherapy planning and monitoring. Her work has pioneered developments in this area.

From 2006 to 2007, she worked as a researcher at Harvard Medical School, Massachusetts General Hospital, Department of Radiation Oncology / Proton Therapy Center in Boston. Grosu was appointed as professor and chair of the Radiation Oncology Department at the University Medical Center Freiburg, Germany in 2007. Her team earned international recognition with major clinical research studies leading to improvements in the diagnosis and treatment of cancer.

== Further positions and memberships ==
Grosu was Vice Dean at the University of Freiburg Faculty of Medicine from 2010 to 2013, and member of the University of Freiburg Senate from 2014 to 2019. Since October 2020 she has been a member of the Freiburg University Council.

Grosu is an advisory board member of German Cancer Aid (Deutsche Krebshilfe). She holds the position of adjunct professor at the Department of Radiation Oncology, Ohio State University.

== Research focus ==
Grosu's research on personalized radiotherapy aims at optimizing radiation therapy, its planning and monitoring, by means of biological imaging, especially positron emission tomography (PET) and multiparametric magnetic resonance imaging (mpMRI). The individual requirements of each patient are determined using biomarkers, bio-imaging and biological radiotherapy planning, resulting in a personalized concept of radiation therapy. Further areas of research include: high precision radiation therapy (radiosurgery and stereotactic radiation therapy, interventional radiation oncology), combination of radiotherapy and immunotherapy, radiation therapy in elderly patients, quality of life (QoL) and radiation therapy, as well as digital data management in radiation oncology.

== Awards and honors ==
- Member of the German National Academy of Sciences Leopoldina since 2018
- 2020 Alfred Breit Award of the German Society of Radiation Oncology (DEGRO) for the integration of biological imaging in radiotherapy planning
- 2022 Grosu was accepted as an Honorary Fellow of the American College of Radiology
