= Evgeni Gross =

Soviet physicist

Evgenii Fedorovich Gross (1897 – 1972) was a Soviet physicist working in optics and spectroscopy of condensed matter.

He graduated from Leningrad University in 1924. He became a correspondent member of the USSR Academy of Sciences in 1946.

His two key achievements are the experimental observation of the fine structure of Rayleigh scattering line due to Brillouin-Mandelstam light scattering on acoustic waves in condensed matter (1930) and the experimental discovery of the exciton (in semiconductor crystals of cuprous oxide) through evidence of its hydrogen-like optical spectrum.
