= Grosz (surname) =

Grosz or Grósz is a surname of several possible origins. "Grosz" is a Polish-language surname originally used by Poles and Polish Jews derived either from the nickname from Polish "grosz", a coin, 1/100 of Polish zloty or from Polish spelling of German Groß, meaning "large". Grósz is a Hungarian language spelling of "Groß". Notable people with this surname include:

- Amihai Grosz (born 1979), Israeli violist
- Barbara J. Grosz (born 1948), American artificial intelligence pioneer
- Dave Grosz (1938–2018), Canadian football player
- Dezső Grósz (1898–1987), Hungarian footballer
- Edith Grosz (1919–2011), American pianist and music educator based in Amsterdam
- Edward M. Grosz (born 1945), American Catholic prelate
- Elizabeth Grosz (born 1952), Australian feminist theorist
- George Grosz (1893–1959), German artist
- Gerald Grosz (born 1977), Austrian author, commentator and politician
- Gisella Grosz (1875–1942), Hungarian classical pianist
- István Grósz (1895–1944), Hungarian middle-distance runner
- Károly Grósz (1930–1996), Hungarian politician
- Marty Grosz (born 1930), German-born American jazz guitarist, banjoist, vocalist and composer
- Peter Grosz, American actor and television writer
- Stephen Grosz (born 1952), British author and psychoanalyst
- Terry Grosz (1941–2019), American game warden
- Wilhelm Grosz (1894–1939), Austrian composer, pianist and conductor
