= Grosz =

Grosz may refer to:

- Grosz, a coin valued as a hundredth of a Polish złoty
- Groschen
- Kraków grosz, 14th-century coins of Kraków
- Grosz (surname)

== See also ==
- Gros (disambiguation)
- Gross (disambiguation)
