= Gros =

Gros may refer to:

== People ==
- Gros (surname)
- Gross (surname), the German variant of Gros
- Le Gros, the Norman variant of Gros

== Other uses ==
- Gros (coinage), a type of 13th-century silver coinage of France
- Gros (grape), another name for Elbling, a variety of white grape
- Groș, a village of the city of Hunedoara, Transylvania, Romania
- General Register Office for Scotland (GROS)

== See also ==
- Gros Morne (disambiguation)
- Gross (disambiguation)
- Grosz (disambiguation)
