= Robert A. Gross (physicist) =

American physicist (1927–2018)

Robert A. Gross (October 31, 1927 – February 8, 2018) was an American physicist.

Gross attended the University of Pennsylvania, and earned a doctorate in applied physics from Harvard University. He subsequently worked for the Fairchild Engine and Airplane Corporation. In 1960, Gross joined the Columbia University faculty, where he later became the Percy K. and Vida L. W. Hudson Professor of Applied Physics. He was named founding chair of Columbia's department of applied physics and nuclear engineering. Gross then led the department of mechanical engineering, and from 1982 to 1990, served as dean of the School of Engineering and Applied Science. He retired in 1995, having received several awards and honors throughout his career, including the Fulbright Scholarship and a Guggenheim Fellowship, as well as fellowship to both the American Physical Society and the American Institute of Aeronautics and Astronautics. Gross died in Chapel Hill, North Carolina, on February 8, 2018, aged 90.

== Personal ==
Robert Gross was the father of David A. Gross and John-Henry Gross.
