= David A. Gross =

American attorney and diplomat

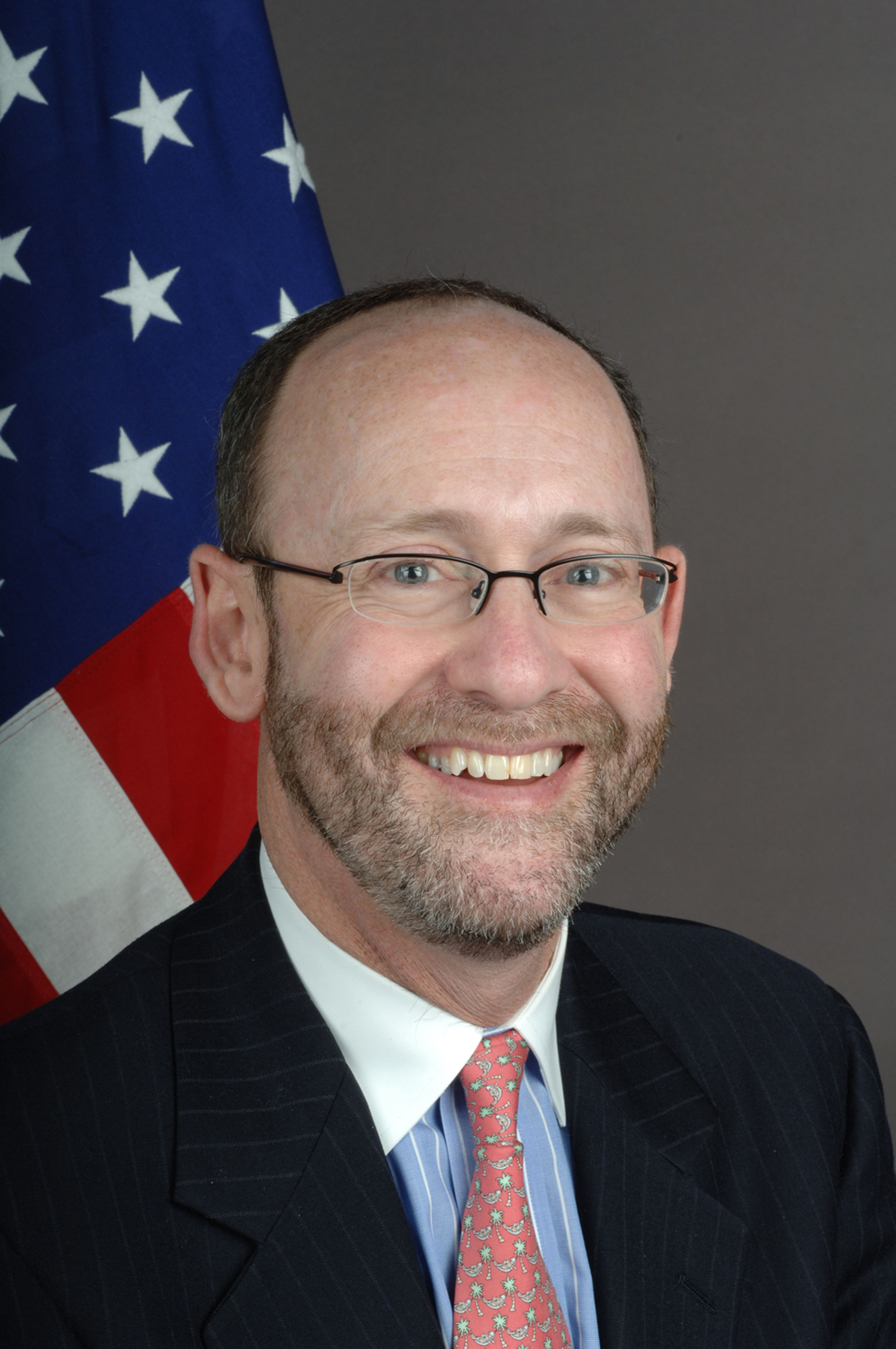
- David A. Gross
- Education: University of Pennsylvania; Columbia Law School
- Occupations: Attorney, diplomat
- Employer: Wiley Rein LLP
- Office: U.S. Coordinator for International Communications and Information Policy
- Term: 2001–2009
- Awards: Order of the Rising Sun (Gold Rays with Neck Ribbon)

David A. Gross is an American lawyer and former U.S. Coordinator for International Communications and Information Policy at the U.S. State Department's Bureau of Economic and Business Affairs.

He is currently a partner in the communications practice of Wiley Rein LLP where he assists U.S. companies seeking to enter or expand international businesses, as well as non-U.S. companies and organizations seeking to invest in, monitor, and understand the U.S. market. Gross also advises foreign companies on non-U.S. countries and opportunities and informs clients regarding the International Telecommunication Union (ITU), Organisation for Economic Co-operation and Development (OECD), Asia-Pacific Economic Cooperation (APEC), and other international bodies.

== Department of State ==
Prior to joining Wiley Rein, Gross served as the U.S. Coordinator for International Communications and Information Policy at the U.S. Department of State's Bureau of Economic and Business Affairs from 2001 to 2009. He was responsible for the formulation and advocacy of international communications policy for the United States. He was appointed by President George W. Bush and unanimously confirmed by the U.S. Senate for the rank of Ambassador.

While at the Department of State, Gross led U.S. delegations to several major international telecommunications conferences, including the International Telecommunication Union (ITU) Plenipotentiary Conference (2002, 2006), ITU World Telecommunication Development Conferences (2002, 2006) and ITU World Telecommunication Standardization Assemblies (2004, 2008). He also led U.S. delegations to three APEC Ministerial Meetings in Shanghai, Lima, and Bangkok.

Gross was the head U.S. government negotiator and head of the delegation for the multilateral preparatory conferences for both phases of the United Nations' "Heads of State" World Summit on the Information Society (WSIS) and was a member of the UN Information and Communications Technologies Task Force and co-led the U.S. delegation to the formal Summits in Geneva (2003) and Tunis (2005). Gross also led interagency telecommunications delegations to many countries, conducted bilateral discussions at senior levels with representatives from more than 70 countries and provided commercial and policy advocacy on behalf of U.S. companies in markets around the world.

In 2021, Gross was awarded the Order of the Rising Sun (Gold Rays with Neck Ribbon) by the Government of Japan for “promoting collaborative relations between Japan and the United States in the area of information and communications”.

== Other positions ==
Gross was the National Executive Director of Lawyers for the 2000 Bush-Cheney presidential campaign and served as Washington Counsel for AirTouch Communications (1994–2000), acquired by Vodafone in 1999. From 1979-1993, he was in private practice at the law firm of Sutherland, Asbill & Brennan.

== Personal ==
Gross received his B.A. in Economics from the University of Pennsylvania and received his Juris Doctor (J.D) from Columbia University Law School. He is a member of the District of Columbia Bar. For many years, he has been active with various bar associations, including the Federal Communications Bar Association (in which he serves as President, has twice been elected as an officer, and has often served as co-chair of various committees) and the International Bar Association (in which he has been vice-chair of the Communications Committee).

Gross's father was physicist Robert A. Gross (physicist), who served as dean of Columbia University's School of Engineering and Applied Science from 1982 to 1990. David Gross resides in Bethesda, Maryland, with his wife and nearby son.

Gross has been listed by Chambers USA among America’s Leading Lawyers for Business in Telecom, Broadcast & Satellite (2018–2025).
