= Samuel Kirk (silversmith) =

American silversmith

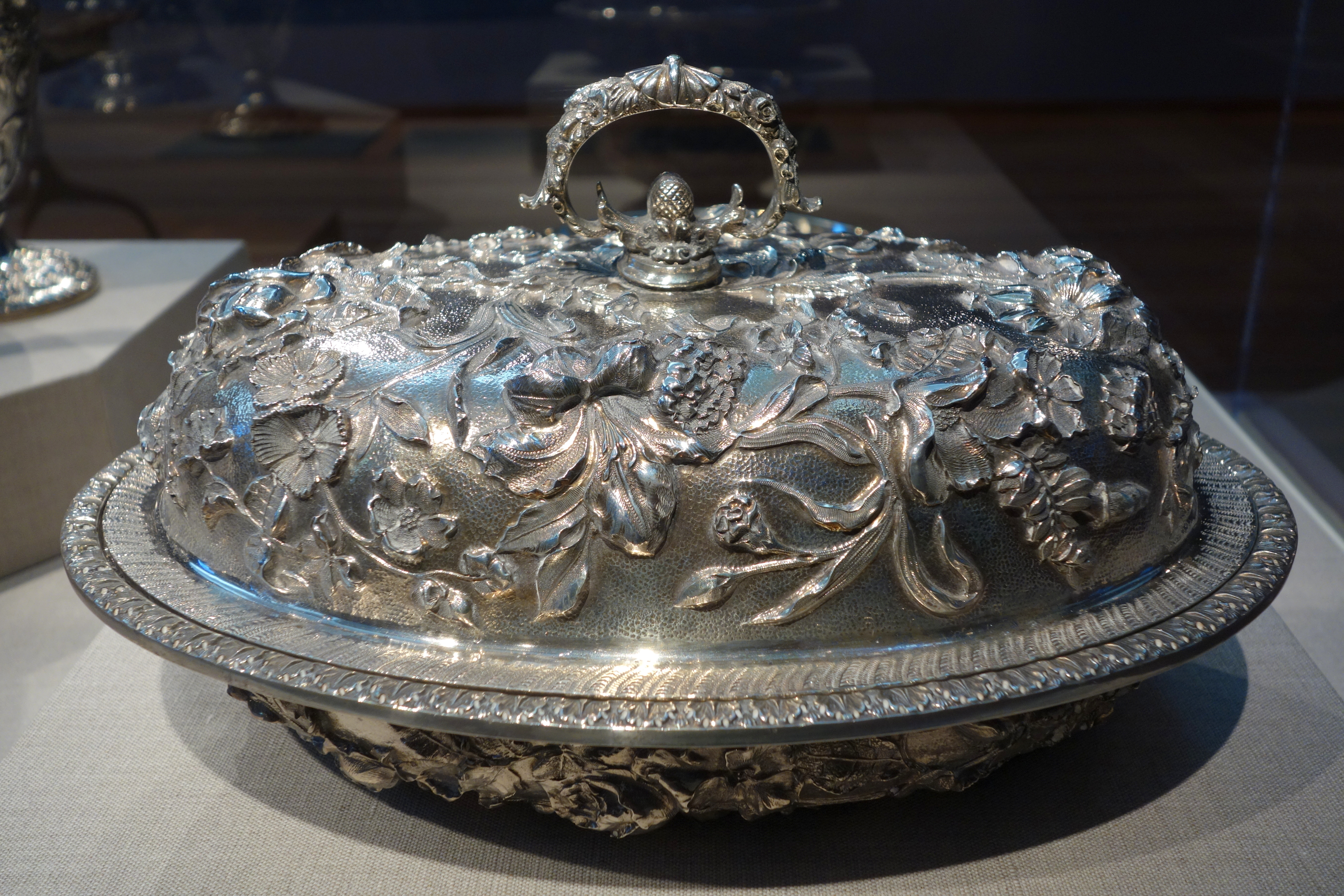
Covered vegetable dish by Samuel Kirk and Sons, c. 1850

Samuel Kirk (February 15, 1793 – July 6, 1872) was an American silversmith, active in Baltimore, Maryland, and best known for his introduction of repoussé to the United States. He engaged in various partnerships with his sons under the names of S. Kirk and Son and S. Kirk and Sons. In 1979 S. Kirk & Son was purchased by the Stieff Company, which renamed itself Kirk Stieff.

Kirk was born in Doylestown, Pennsylvania, apprenticed in 1810 to James Howell in Philadelphia, and partnered from 1815 to 1820 with John Smith in Baltimore with their shop at 212 Market Street (later known as 106 Baltimore Street). On March 18, 1817, he married Albina Powell. He then worked from 1820 to 1826 in his own practice at 30 Baltimore Street, then from 1826 to 1830 at 140 Baltimore Street, and from 1831 to 1846 at 144 Baltimore Street. During this early period Kirk introduced to America a chased floral repoussé pattern for silverware, probably inspired by East India silversmiths, which is still known generically as "Baltimore Silver." From 1846 onwards he partnered with his children: from 1846 to 1861 with Henry Child Kirk as S. KIRK & SON; from 1861 to 1868 with Henry Child, Charles Douglas, and Edwin Clarence Kirk as S. KIRK & SONS; from 1868 to 1870 with Henry Child Kirk as S. KIRK & SON; and again from 1870 to 1896 with Henry Child Kirk and Henry, Jr. as S. KIRK & SON (which continued after his death, in a house fire in 1872). At Henry Child Kirk' death in 1896, the firm became S. Kirk & Son Co. The company became S. Kirk & Son INC. from 1924 to 1932, and then S. Kirk & Son (dropping the INC) from 1932 onwards.

Between 1815 and 1886, Only COIN silver was produced by the firm. It was illegal to melt US Coins, so the firm imported Foreign coins to melt into wares. French coins with a purity of 11/12 parts silver and marked 11 OZ are 91.6% silver. Spanish coins with a purity of 10.15/12 parts silver are marked 10.15 and have a purity of 84.6% silver. S. Kirk & Son first made 925/1000 silver in the year 1886. They produced Coin and 925 silver until 1896, when they dropped the Coin silver from the line. The purity mark used was 925/1000 between 1886 and 1914. The word STERLING was first used in 1914 works.

Kirk's work includes two silver cups for General Lafayette to commemorate his visit to Baltimore, President James Monroe's flatware service for his daughter's wedding, and a 48-piece dinner service for the USS Maryland that illustrates almost two hundred scenes from Maryland's history. His work is collected in the Metropolitan Museum of Art, Dallas Museum of Art, and the De Young Museum,
