= David L. Gross =

David Gross is professor of history emeritus at University of Colorado at Boulder. His work focuses on intellectual history of modern Europe (from the 18th century), aspects of modernity, and the roles of remembering and forgetting in the late stages of modern culture. Gross is an associate editor of the journal Telos. Gross is notable for examining European culture in terms of broad themes and tropes such as the interplay of forgetting and remembering in the delineation of contemporary culture. In addition to his teaching, Gross serves as editor for the "Critical Perspectives on Modern Culture" Series at the University of Massachusetts Press.

== Selected books ==
- Past in Ruins (University of Massachusetts Press, 2009)
- Lost Time: On Remembering and Forgetting in Late Modern Culture (University of Massachusetts Press, 2000)
- The Writer and Society: Heinrich Mann and Literary Politics in Germany, 1890-1940 (Humanities Press, 1980)

== Selected articles ==
- "On Writing Cultural Criticism" (TELOS, Summer 1973)
- "Lowenthal, Adorno, Barthes: Three Perspectives on Popular Culture" (TELOS, Fall 1980)
- "Time, Space, and Modern Culture" (TELOS, Winter 1981-2)
- "Weber in Context: The Dilemmas of Modernity" (TELOS, Winter 1988-9)
- "Rescuing the Past" (TELOS, Winter 1990-1)
