= Legros =

Legros, LeGros or Le Gros is an ancient Norman/French surname. It literally means "the Large". Notable people with the surname or nickname include:

== Surname ==
- Alphonse Legros (1837–1911), French painter and etcher
- Augustus Asplet Le Gros (1840–1877), Norman language poet from Jersey and a Jurat of the Royal Court of Jersey
- Bartholomew le Gros (before 1189–after 1253), prelate of French origin in Hungary
- Danielle Legros Georges (c. 1965–2025), Haitian-born American poet, essayist and academic
- Fernand Legros (1931–1983), French art dealer
- James LeGros (born 1962), American film and television actor
- Joseph Legros (1739–1793), French singer and composer
- Pierre Le Gros the Elder (1629–1714), French sculptor working primarily at Versailles
- Pierre Le Gros the Younger (1666–1719), French sculptor
- Raymond le Gros, Anglo-Norman commander
- William le Gros, 1st Earl of Albemarle (died 1179), Count of Aumale, Earl of York, and Lord of Holderness

== Nickname ==
- Charles Le Gros, anglicized as Charles the Fat, (839–888), King of The Franks, Alemannia, Italy, East Francia, and West Francia
- Henry I of Navarre, also known as Henri le Gros (“Henry the Fat”), Count of Champagne, King of Navarre 1244-1274
- Louis VI Le Gros, King of France
