= Robert Arthur Gross =

American composer and violinist

Robert Arthur Gross (March 23, 1914 – November 6, 1983) was an American composer and violinist.

A native of Colorado Springs, Colorado, where composer Cecil Effinger would be born four months later, Gross began studies under Leopold Auer and Edouard Dethier at the Juilliard School when he was twelve; while there, he also studied composition under Bernard Wagenaar. He also took private lessons with both Roger Sessions – whose violin concerto he premiered – and Arnold Schoenberg. He taught for some time at Occidental College, twice serving as chairman of the school's music department. Among his pupils there was John McGuire. Most of Gross' music was for chamber forces, but he composed two operas, one on The Bald Soprano and one, a science fiction satire, titled Project 1521; both were premiered at Occidental College, in 1962 and 1974 respectively. A handful of the chamber works appeared on records. Gross also made recordings himself, as a violinist.

Gross died in Los Angeles. His papers are held at the University of Calgary.
