= Jacob Gross (piano maker) =

German piano maker 1819–1899

Jacob Gross (July 26, 1819 – 1899) was born in Württemberg, Germany. Considered an expert piano maker of the old school, he learned his trade in Stuttgart and afterwards worked in some of the leading factories of Germany, Switzerland, Spain and Paris. Going to America in 1848, he familiarized himself with the methods prevailing there, working in Troy, New York then going to Baltimore. He worked for Charles Stieff in the Steiff Piano Factory from 1856, and on Christmas Day 1860 he married Catharina Christiana Stieff (1833–1906), Charles' daughter. His joining the Stieff family business was an excellent combination: the professional musician and businessman, Steiff, supported by the artistic piano maker and factory expert, Gross. When Charles died, the business was continued successfully by his sons, Charles Jr. and Frederick P. Stieff. The technical management of the factories transferred to the hands of Jacob's son Charles, who he had trained to be his replacement.
