= List of compositions by Kaikhosru Shapurji Sorabji =

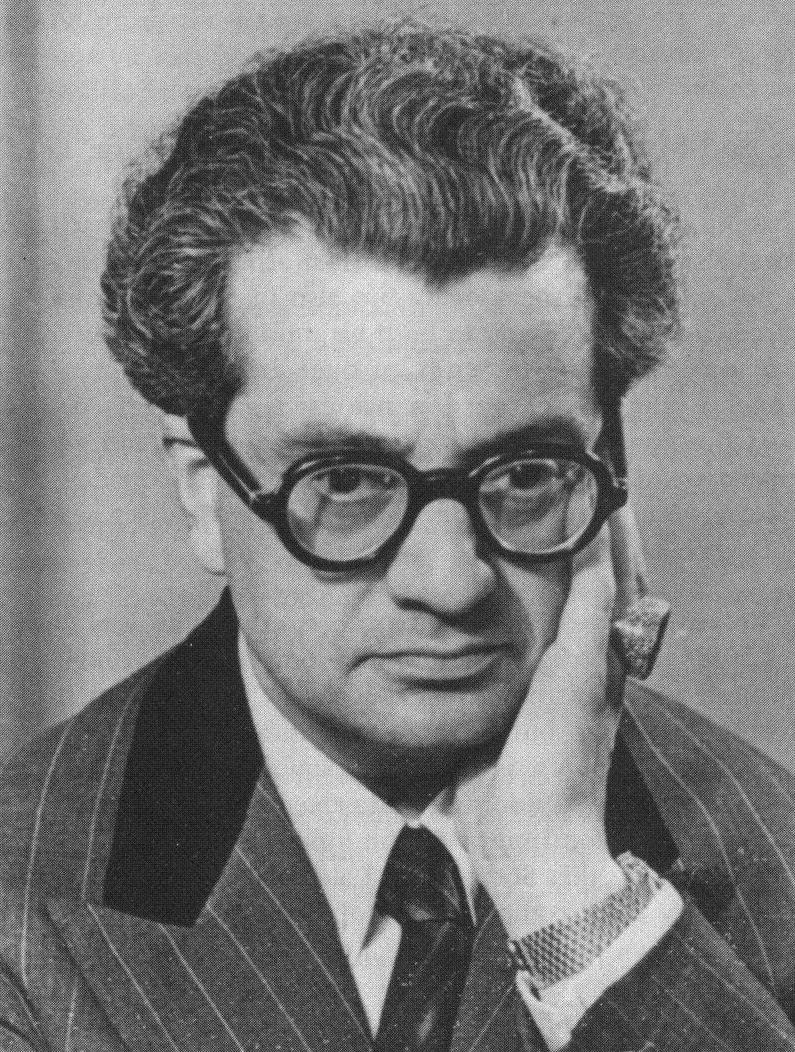
Kaikhosru Shapurji Sorabji in 1945

The following is a list of compositions of Kaikhosru Shapurji Sorabji sorted by instrumentation. Within the individual sections, the pieces are arranged by genre and chronologically.

The list of works found here is based on the information provided by Marc-André Roberge's Sorabji Resource Site. Since Sorabji's piece titles tend to contain various problems, Roberge's site amends them when necessary.

== Works for orchestra with voices ==
=== Symphonies ===
- No. 1 for Piano, Large Orchestra, Chorus, and Organ, KSS30 (1921–22; 300 pp.) (Note: Alistair Hinton has described this work as a piano concerto.)
- The work bearing the name "Symphony II for Piano, Large Orchestra, Organ, Final Chorus, and Six Solo Voices" was intended as an orchestral work. Only the piano part (written 1930–31) was completed, yet it is one of Sorabji's longest piano compositions of all and has been described as self-sufficient. Roberge's catalogue renames it to Symphony No. 0 for Piano Solo (see the section on the piano symphonies for the full details of the item).
- No. 2, Jāmī, for Large Orchestra, Wordless Chorus, and Baritone Solo, KSS72 (1942–51; 826 pp.)
  1. (with chorus)
  2. (with chorus)
  3. (with chorus)
  4. Cantico (with chorus and baritone)

=== Other ===
- Messa grande sinfonica, for eight soloists, two choirs, and orchestra, KSS84 (1955–61; 1,001 pp.)
  1. Kyrie
  2. Gloria [with 11 settings of the text]: Passacaglia, Interlude, Di nuovo la passacaglia
  3. Credo—Offertorium [the Credo with 6 settings of the text]
  4. Sanctus [with 5 settings of the text]
  5. Pater noster [with 15 settings of the text]
  6. Agnus dei [with 3 settings of the text]
  7. Amen

== Works for orchestra without voices ==
=== Piano concertos ===
Numbered: (Note: The numbering used by Roberge is based on reconstructed chronology, not on the numbers found in the manuscripts; "Concerto V for Piano and Large Orchestra" (1927–28), for instance, was the eighth in order of composition. Some of the concertos were not numbered by Sorabji.)

- No. 1, KSS6 (1915–16; 177 pp.)
  1. Modéré
  2. Très lent. Toujours enveloppé d'une atmosphère de chaleur tropicale et langoureuse
  3. Impétueux et impatient
- No. 2, KSS14 (1916–17; only two-piano version survives; 49 pp.)
  - Modéré
  - Lent
  - Galvanique mais sans trop de hâte d'abord
- No. 3, KSS16 (1918; 100 pp.)
  - Modérément animé, avec une expression très libre et fantaisiste
  - Assez lent
  - Vif et animé
- No. 4, KSS18 (1918; 100 pp.)
  1. Modérément animé
  2. Très lent
  3. Galvanique. Animé, mais pas trop vite
- No. 5, KSS27 (1920; 144 pp.)
- No. 6, KSS32 (1922; 144 pp.)
  1. Animé
  2. Lent
  3. Vif
- No. 7, Sīmurgh-‘Anqā, KSS38 (1924; 100 pp.)
  1. Assez animé, nerveux
  2. Lent mais pas traîné. Ordinairement très doux et "piano"
  3. Très animé
- No. 8, KSS45 (1927–28; 344 pp.)
  1. Ardito—focosamente
  2. [Untitled]
  3. Rude, sauvage et brutal

Unnumbered:

- Symphonic Variations for Piano and Orchestra, KSS78 (1935–37, 1953–56; Sorabji added an "Introitus" for orchestra alone and orchestrated the first volume [27 variations] of the three-book Symphonic Variations for Piano; 540 pp.)
- Opus clavisymphonicum—Concerto for Piano and Large Orchestra, KSS80 (1957–59; 333 pp.)
  1. Vivo
  2. Toccata; Cadenza fugata; Adagio–Epilogo
- Opusculum clavisymphonicum vel claviorchestrale, KSS94 (1973–75; 334 pp.)
  1. Moderatamente animato
  2. Variazioni sopra il Credo in qualsiasi modo del Gretchaninoff

=== Other ===
- Chaleur—Poème, KSS15 (1916–17; 40 pp.)
- Opusculum for Orchestra, KSS34 (1923; 36 pp.)

== Works for voice(s) and chamber ensemble ==
- Music to "The Rider by Night" KSS22 (1919; libretto written by Robert Nichols; full score missing (Note: Pages 21–40 of the 54-page manuscript are lost.))
- Cinque sonetti di Michelagniolo Buonarroti, for baritone, flute, oboe, clarinet, bassoon, piano, and strings, KSS36 (1923; 40 pp.)
  - "Tu sa' ch'i' so, signor mie, che tu sai"
  - "Non so se s'è la desïata luce"
  - "A che più debb'i' mai l'intensa voglia"
  - "Veggio nel tuo bel viso, signor mio"
  - "Se nel volto per gli occhi il cor si vede"

== Works for bells ==
- Suggested Bell-Chorale for St. Luke's Carillon, KSS82 (1961; 1 p.) (Note: The piece was written for and dedicated to Norman Pierre Gentieu, one time a bell-ringer at St. Luke's Church in Germantown, Pennsylvania (now incorporated into Philadelphia).)

== Works for voice and piano ==
- The Poplars, KSS1 (1915; Ducic, translated by Selver; 2 versions; 3 pp.)
- Chrysilla, KSS2 (1915; de Régnier; 4 pp.)
- Roses du soir, KSS3 (1915; Louÿs; 4 pp.)
- L'heure exquise, KSS4 (1916; Verlaine; 2 pp.)
- Vocalise pour soprano fioriturata, KSS5 (1916; 2 versions; 3 pp.)
- Apparition, KSS7 (1916; Mallarmé; 5 pp.)
- Hymne à Aphrodite, KSS8 (1916; Tailhade; 2 versions; 5 pp.)
- L'étang, KSS10 (1917; Rollinat; 2 pp.)
- I Was Not Sorrowful—Poem for Voice and Piano [Spleen], KSS11 (between 1917 and 1919; Dowson; 3 pp.)
- Trois poèmes pour chant et piano, KSS21 (1918, 1919; Baudelaire and Verlaine; 9 pp.)
  - Correspondances (Baudelaire)
  - Crépuscule du soir mystique (Verlaine)
  - Pantomime (Verlaine)
- Trois fêtes galantes de Verlaine, KSS37 (c. 1924?; 11 pp.)
  - L'allée
  - à la Promenade
  - Dans la Grotte
- Le mauvais jardinier KSS11a (1919; Gilkin; only the first page is extant)
- Arabesque, KSS24 (1920; Shamsuʾd-Dīn Ibrāhīm Mīrzā; 2 pp.)
- Trois Poèmes du "Gulistān" de Saʿdī, KSS42 (1926, rev. 1930; translated by Toussaint; 16 pp.)
  - La lampe
  - La Jalousie
  - La Fidelité
- L'irrémédiable, KSS44 (1927; Baudelaire; 8 pp.)
- Movement for Voice and Piano, KSS52 (1927, 1931; 9 pp.)
- Trois poèmes, KSS65 (1941; Verlaine and Baudelaire; 13 pp.)
  - Le Faune (Verlaine)
  - Les Chats (Baudelaire)
  - La dernière fête galante (Verlaine)
- Frammento cantato, KSS88 (1967; Harold Morland; 1 p.)

== Chamber works ==
=== Piano quintets ===
- No. 1, KSS26 (1919–20; 72 pp.)
- No. 2, KSS54 (1932–33; 432 pp.)
  1. Introito; Fantasia; Coda–Finale
  2. Preludio; Passacaglia
  3. Adagio
  4. Finale: Introduction; Allegro; Intermezzo; Coda–Epilogo

=== Other ===
- Concertino non grosso for String Sextet with Piano obbligato quasi continuo, for 4 violins, viola, and cello, KSS89 (1968; 48 pp.)
  1. Vivace assai
  2. Adagio
  3. Finale. Vivace, leggiero
- Il tessuto d'arabeschi, for flute and string quartet, KSS99 (1979; 32 pp.)
- Fantasiettina atematica, for oboe, flute, and clarinet, KSS103 (1981; 2 pp.)

== Works for piano ==
=== Symphonies ===
- No. 0, KSS51 (1930–31; piano part of the otherwise unfinished Symphony II for Piano, Large Orchestra, Organ, Final Chorus, and Six Solo Voices; 333 pp.)
  1. Prologo; Introito; Fantasia; Cadenza; Coda–Stretta
  2. Adagio; Punta d'organo; Notturno–Fantasia; Ritournelle–point d'orgue
  3. Prelude; Toccata variata; Cadenza–fugata; Coda–Epilogo
- No. 1, Tāntrik, KSS60 (1938–39; 284 pp.)
  1. Mūlādhāra
  2. (Svādhiṣṭhāna)
  3. (Maṇipūra)
  4. (Anāhata Cakra). Mormorando e morbidissimo
  5. Viśuddha
  6. Ājñā
  7. Sahasrāra [Padma]. Fuga libera a cinque voci
- No. 2, KSS75 (1954; 248 pp.)
  - Parte Prima
    1. Intrecciata politematica
  - Parte Seconda
    2. Aria fiorita: piuttosto notturno
    3. Moto perpetuo; Interludio; Coda
  - Parte Terza
    4. Fanfare; Introito; Toccata; Punta d'organo constanziata; Fuga
    5. Adagio–Finale
- No. 3, KSS81 (1959–60; in one continuous movement consisting of multiple sections; 144 pp.)
- No. 4, KSS85 (1962–64; 240 pp.)
  1. Moderatamente allegro
  2. Preludio corale; Interludio; Ostinato; Variazioni
  3. Finale
- No. 5, Symphonia brevis, KSS92 (1973; 120 pp.)
  1. Preludio; Intreccio; Stretta
  2. Adagio; Preludio quasi toccata; Aria fiorita; Interludio; Notturno; Nexus; Quasi fuga; Coda–Epilogo

- No. 6, Symphonia claviensis, KSS95 (1975–76; 270 pp.)
  - Prima Parte
    1. Introito; Intrecciata; Interludio fugato; Coda–Epilogo
  - Seconda Parte
    2. Preludio; Interludio placido; Animato quasi scherzo; Moto perpetuo; Ostinato
    3. Quasi adagio
    4. Quasi Alkan
  - Terza Parte
    5. Arabesque-Nocturne
    6. Quasi fuga
    7. Coda–Epilogo

=== Sonatas ===
- No. 0, KSS9 (1917; discovered posthumously and unnumbered; 30 pp.)
- No. 1, KSS20 (1919; 42 pp.)
- No. 2, KSS28 (1920; 49 pp.)
- No. 3, KSS29 (1922; 75 pp.)
- No. 4, KSS48 (1928–29; 111 pp.)
  1. Vivo—arditamente
  2. Count Tasca's Garden
  3. Preludio; Fantasia; Cadenza; Fuga duplex quatuor vocibus; Coda–Stretta
- No. 5, Opus archimagicum, KSS58 (1934–35; 336 pp.)
  - Pars prima: Arcana minora
    1. Fiero, ardito
    2. Presto, sotto voce inquieto
    3. Punta d'organo
    4. Con fuoco, ardito e fiero
  - Pars altera: Arcana majora
    5. [Untitled]
    6. Adagio
  - Pars tertia et ultima: Archimagus
    7. Preludio
    8. Preludio-corale sopra "Dies irae"
    9. Cadenza
    10. Fuga libera a cinque voci e tre soggetti

=== Multi-movement toccatas ===
- No. 1, KSS46 (1928; 66 pp.)
  1. Preludio–Corale
  2. Passacaglia
  3. Cadenza
  4. Fuga
  5. Coda–Stretta
- No. 2, KSS57 (1933–34; 111 pp.)
  1. Preludio-Toccata
  2. Preludio-Corale
  3. Scherzo
  4. Aria
  5. Ostinato
  6. Notturno
  7. Interludio–Moto perpetuo. Riflesso del Preludio–Toccata
  8. Cadenza–Punta d'organo
  9. Fuga libera a cinque voci
- No. 3, KSS76 (1955; 91 pp.)
  1. Movimento vivo
  2. Adagio
  3. Passacaglia
  4. Cadenza
  5. Quasi fugato
  6. Corranta
  7. Fantasia
  8. Interludio
  9. Cappriccio
  10. Epilogo
- No. 4, Toccata quarta, KSS87 (1964–67; 149 pp.)
  1. Theme [with 24 variations]; Nexus
  2. Quasi corale
  3. Intermezzo primo: Moto perpetuo; Punta d'organo; Aria
  4. Passacaglia
  5. Intermezzo secondo. Of a neophyte and how the Black Art was revealed unto Him by the Fiend Asomuel
  6. Cadenza–Toccata
  7. Preludio adagio; Fuga quintuplex

=== Variation sets ===
- Variazioni e fuga triplice sopra "Dies irae" per pianoforte, KSS41 (1923–26; 64 variations; the work is in two parts of 32 variations each; 201 pp.)
- Symphonic Variations for Piano, KSS59 (1935–37; 81 variations; in three books [each consisting of 27 variations], of which the first was later orchestrated; 484 pp.)
- Sequentia cyclica super "Dies irae" ex Missa pro defunctis, KSS71 (1948–49; 27 variations; 335 pp.)
- "Il gallo d'oro" da Rimsky-Korsakov: Variazioni frivole con una fuga anarchica, eretica e perversa (1978–79; 53 variations; 93 pp.)

=== Sets of aphoristic fragments ===
- Frammenti aforistici (Sutras) (104), KSS90 (1962–64; 37 pp.)
- Frammenti aforistici (20), KSS86 (1964; 9 pp.)
- Frammenti aforistici (4), KSS96 (1977; 1 p.)

=== Transcriptions ===
- Three Pastiches, KSS31 (1922; 17 pp.)
  - Pastiche on the "Minute Waltz" by Chopin (1922)
  - Pastiche on the Habanera from Bizet's "Carmen" (1922)
  - Pastiche on the Hindu Merchant's Song from Rimsky-Korsakov's "Sadko" (1922)
- Rapsodie espagnole de Maurice Ravel—Transcription de concert pour piano, KSS33 (first version; 1923; 16 pp.)
- Pasticcio capriccioso sopra l'op. 64, no 1 del Chopin, KSS56 (1933; 8 pp.) (Note: According to Roberge, this work and Sorabji's 3 transcriptions from 1922 are not pastiches, and the most accurate description of them—even more than "transcription"—is "Nachdichtung".)
- Transcription in the Light of Harpsichord Technique for the Modern Piano of the Chromatic Fantasia of J. S. Bach, Followed by a Fugue, KSS61 (1940; 15 pp.)
- Rapsodie espagnole de Maurice Ravel—Transcription de concert pour piano, KSS67 (second version; 1945; 26 pp.)
- Transcription of the Prelude in E-flat by Bach, KSS68 (1945; based on BWV 815a; 4 pp.)
- Schlussszene aus "Salome" von Richard Strauss—Konzertmäßige Übertragung für Klavier zu zwei Händen, KSS70 (1947; transcription of the closing scene of Salome by R. Strauss; 25 pp.)

=== Other ===
- Quasi habanera, KSS12 (1917; 6 pp.)
- Désir éperdu (Fragment), KSS13 (1917; 1 p.)
- Fantaisie espagnole, KSS19 (1919; 23 pp.)
- Two Piano Pieces, KSS17 (In the Hothouse [1918] and Toccata [1920]; 20 pp.)
- Prelude, Interlude, and Fugue for Piano, KSS25 (1920, 1922; 17 pp.)
- Le jardin parfumé—Poem for Piano Solo, KSS35 (1923; 16 pp.)
- Valse-fantaisie for Piano, KSS40 (1925; 16 pp.)
- Fragment: Prelude and Fugue on FxAxx DAxEx, KSS41a (1926; 3 pp.)
- Fragment Written for Harold Rutland, KSS43 (1926, 1928, 1937; 8 pp.)
- Nocturne, "Djāmī", KSS47 (1928; 28 pp.)
- Passacaglia, KSS48a (1929; unfinished; 41 pp.)
- Introduction, Passacaglia, Cadenza, and Fugue (2004; Alexander Abercrombie's completion of the unfinished 1929 Passacaglia; 79 pp.)
- Toccatinetta sopra C.G.F., KSS49 (1929; 8 pp.)
- Opus clavicembalisticum, KSS50 (1929–30; 253 pp.) (Note: This work has been described as a toccata.)
- Fantasia ispanica, KSS55 (1933; 54 pp.)
- Quaere reliqua hujus materiei inter secretiora, KSS62 (1940; based on the story "Count Magnus" by M. R. James; 16 pp.)
- "Gulistān"—Nocturne for Piano, KSS63 (1940; 28 pp.)
- St. Bertrand de Comminges: "He was laughing in the tower", KSS64 (1941; based on the story "Canon Alberic's Scrap-Book" by M. R. James; 16 pp.)
- Études transcendantes (100), KSS66 (1940–44; 456 pp.)
- Concerto da suonare da me solo e senza orchestra, per divertirmi, KSS69 (1946; 70 pp.)
  1. Incomincia l'orchestra arrogante e pomposa
  2. [Untitled]
  3. Scherzo diabolico
- Un nido di scatole sopra il nome del grande e buon amico Harold Rutland, KSS74 (1954; 26 pp.) (Note: Simon John Abrahams classifies this piece as a variation set. If considered as such, it is one with 16 variations.)
- Passeggiata veneziana sopra la Barcarola di Offenbach, KSS77 (1955–56; based on "Barcarolle" from Offenbach's The Tales of Hoffmann; 24 pp.)
- Rosario d'Arabeschi, KSS79 (1956; 45 pp.)
- Fantasiettina sul nome illustre dell'egregio poeta Christopher Grieve ossia Hugh M'Diarmid, KSS83 (1961; 10 pp.)
- Variazione maliziosa e perversa sopra "La morte d'Åse" da Grieg, KSS93 (1974; based on "The Death of Åse" from Grieg's Peer Gynt; 2 pp.)
- Symphonic Nocturne for Piano Alone, KSS97 (1977–78; 113 pp.)
- Villa Tasca: Mezzogiorno siciliano—Evocazione nostalgica e memoria tanta cara e preziosa del giardino meraviglioso, splendido, tropicale, KSS100 (1979–80; 47 pp.)
- Opus secretum atque necromanticum, KSS101 (1980–81; 48 pp.)
- Passeggiata variata sul nome del caro e gentile amico Clive Spencer-Bentley, KSS102 (1981; 3 pp.)
- Passeggiata arlecchinesca sopra un frammento di Busoni ("Rondò arlecchinesco"), KSS105 (1981–82; based on material from Busoni's Rondò Arlecchinesco; 16 pp.)
- Due sutras sul nome dell'amico Alexis, KSS104 (1981, 1984; 2 pp.)

== Works for organ ==
=== Symphonies ===
- No. 1, KSS39 (1924; 81 pp.)
  1. Prelude; Passacaglia; Postlude
  2. Introduction; [Quasi fugue]; Coda
  3. Moderato; Cadenza de' pedali; [Di nuovo il moderato]; Cadenza–Toccata; Coda–Stretto
- No. 2, KSS53 (1929–32; 350 pp.)
  1. Introduction
  2. Thema cum variationibus
  3. Finale: Preludio; Adagio; Toccata; Fuga triplex
- No. 3, KSS73 (1949–53; 305 pp.)
  1. Introito; Fantasia; Coda–Ripieno
  2. Grave; Corale–Fantasia; Ripieno
  3. Toccata; Passacaglia; Cadenza fantasiata; Fuga sextuplex

== Works for baritone and organ ==
- Benedizione di San Francesco d'Assisi, KSS91 (1973; 2 pp.)

== Lost works ==
- Transcription of "In a Summer Garden", piano transcription of Delius's 1908 orchestral piece In a Summer Garden (1914)
- Vocalise No. 2 (1916)
- Medea (1916)
- The Reiterated Chord (1916; only sketches survive)
- Black Mass (1922)
- Music for "Faust" (c. 1930)
- The Line (1932)
- Le agonie (1951)

== Notes and references ==
Notes

== Sources ==
- Abrahams, Simon John (2002). Le mauvais jardinier: A Reassessment of the Myths and Music of Kaikhosru Shapurji Sorabji (Ph.D.). King's College London.
- Roberge, Marc-André (1991). "The Busoni Network and the Art of Creative Transcription" (PDF). Canadian University Music Review. 11 (1). Ottawa: Société de musique des universités canadiennes: 68–88. doi:10.7202/1014831ar.
