= Transcendental Studies (Sorabji) =

Set of études by Kaikhosru Shapurji Sorabji

100 Transcendental Studies (French: Études transcendantes) (Note: The original title given by Sorabji is Études transcendentales. This title, however, is unidiomatic, as the French word "transcendentale" is used to describe a certain philosophy or meditation, not something surpassing a certain level. For this reason, Paul Rapoport and Marc-André Roberge suggest the corrected title Études transcendantes be used.) by Kaikhosru Shapurji Sorabji are a series of 100 piano études written between 1940 and 1944. Swedish pianist Fredrik Ullén has released all 100 études on BIS Records.

== Description ==
The études vary greatly in style, character, and length, with the shortest running only 45 seconds and the longest running approximately 56 minutes. According to the Sorabji Archive, the following études have yet to be premiered: Nos. 27, 33, 39, 42, 45–48, 51, 53–58, 60–64, 68, 74, 82, 87, 90, 91 and 93.

Sorabji almost certainly intended for these Études to be compared with Franz Liszt's Transcendental Études. The style of Sorabji's études is typical of his work, consisting of atonal melodies, dissonant harmonies, complex polyrhythms, rapid changes in texture and mood, and extreme technical challenges for the pianist to work through. Taken individually, these are some of the shortest pieces Sorabji ever composed. A complete list of the études is included below. World première pianists and dates from The Sorabji Archive.

== World première pianists and dates ==
Number	Title	Duration	Premiere artist	Premiere date	Notes
1	Mouvementé	1:50	Yonty Solomon	9/30/1979	An opening theme is presented and then repeated in multiple keys, inversions, and voices. Somewhat reminiscent of the opening of Chopin's 24 Preludes, Op. 28
2	Vivace e leggiero	1:09	Carlo Grante	7/20/1995	Rapid jumps in both hands alternating between high and low notes meander up and down the keyboard in unison
3	(no marking)	4:17	Carlo Grante	3/24/2000	A wistful melody moves slowly around the keyboard, containing many expressive passages and rich harmonies
4	Scriabinesco. Soave e con tenerezza nostalgica	2:53	Carlo Grante	10/18/1998	As the marking indicates, this study evokes a mood reminiscent of Scriabin's late works, with a soft, expressive melody and harmonies reminiscent of Scriabin's works built around his "mystic chord"
5	Staccato e leggiero	1:24	Fredrik Ullén	4/27/2002	Both hands play triplets of large chords marked staccato; played with effective use of the sostenuto pedal
6	(no marking)	1:37	Fredrik Ullén	7/15/2002	The first in a sequence of double-note études that explore every interval; an étude in seconds with frequent 3:4 polyrhythms.
7	Leggiero abbastanza	1:07	Carlo Grante	7/20/1995	
8	(no marking)	1:56	Fredrik Ullén	2/15/2003	An étude in thirds --- mostly appearing in the right hand, with the left accompanying, but occasionally transferred to the left hand. The accompaniment consists of chords and countermelodies; the mood is contemplative.
9	Staccato e leggiero	0:58	Andrew Ball	11/2/1997	
10	Con brio ed impeto - Volante	3:09	Yonty Solomon	9/30/1979	An intense, fiery etude consisting of rapidly ascending and descending arpeggios (some mirrored between the hands) underpinned by sharply dissonant chords.
11	Animato abbastanza	1:37	Fredrik Ullén	8/17/2003	
12	Leggerio quasi “saltando”	1:44	Carlo Grante	8/23/1996	
13	(no marking)	3:31	Fredrik Ullén	2/15/2003	Another piece evoking Scriabin, beginning with groups of three note pairs in chromatic scales that move slowly and tremblingly up and down, developing into larger structures but with the underlying tremolo texture consistent throughout
14	Tranquillamente soave	4:35	Fredrik Ullén	2/15/2003	
15	(no marking)	1:40	Andrew Ball	11/2/1997	
16	(no marking)	2:43	Carlo Grante	2/8/1998	
17	Molto accentato	1:56	Giampaolo Nuti	11/13/1999	
18	Liscio. Tranquillamente scorrevole	5:13	Giampaolo Nuti	11/13/1999	
19	Saltando e leggiero	2:12	Carlo Grante	6/2/1996	As the name implies, this etude consists of clusters of four notes in both hands which require the pianist to "jump" up and down the keyboard rapidly
20	Con fantasia	5:24	Fredrik Ullén	7/9/2003	This nocturne-like slower etude consists of a melody in the right hand with wispy, complex rhythms against simple arpeggios and chords in the left hand
21	Con eleganza e disinvoltura	4:37	Fredrik Ullén	7/9/2003	
22	Leggiero volante e presto assai	1:24	Fredrik Ullén	7/9/2003	
23	Dolcemente scorrevole	1:24	Fredrik Ullén	9/22/2005	
24	Mouvementé	5:40	Yonty Solomon	9/30/1979	
25	Vivace e secco	2:42	Fredrik Ullén	8/11/2003	
26	Dolcissimo	9:56	Fredrik Ullén	8/11/2003	
27	Staccato e leggiero a capriccio	2:57	(unperformed)		
28	Leggiero e volante	2:15	Fredrik Ullén	8/17/2003	
29	A capriccio. Leggiero	2:09	Fredrik Ullén	9/22/2005	
30	Con fantasia	4:36	Fredrik Ullén	9/22/2005	
31	Vivace assai	2:14	Carlo Grante	7/20/1995	
32	Legato possible, quasi dolce	3:12	Fredrik Ullén	8/17/2003	
33	Vivace e brioso	4:42	(unperformed)		
34	Soave e dolce. Insinuante	4:11	Fredrik Ullén	8/17/2003	
35	(no marking)	2:17	Fredrik Ullén	3/22/2006	
36	Mano sinistra sempre sola	7:16	Nicola Ventrella	11/20/1999	A two-part etude for the left hand alone, the first part consisting of a warm, expressive melody with typically complex harmonies, the second consisting of a technically challenging one-handed fugue with some voices in two- and three-note chords in parts
37	Riflessioni. Moderato	3:54	Fredrik Ullén	8/11/2003	
38	Con fantasia	4:53	Sid Samberg	9/10/2013	An étude in minor ninths --- mostly appearing in the right hand, with the left accompanying, but occasionally transferred to the left hand. Littered with complex polyrhythms and contrapuntal passages in the accompaniment.
39	(no marking)	3:34	(unperformed)		
40	Moderato	3:09	Fredrik Ullén	8/17/2003	
41	(no marking)	3:40	Fredrik Ullén	8/19/2006	
42	Impetuoso e con fuoco ed energia	4:15	(unperformed)		
43	(no marking)	4:39	Fredrik Ullén	8/19/2006	
44	Ben cantato. Dolce e chiaro	15:25	Kentaro Noda	11/2/2008	
45	(no marking)	1:26	(unperformed)		
46	(no marking)	2:44	(unperformed)		
47	Leggiero e a capriccio	2:35	(unperformed)		
48	Volante	3:14	(unperformed)		
49	Vivace ma non troppo	2:23	Fredrik Ullén	8/17/2003	
50	Per il pedale 3	4:50	Fredrik Ullén	8/17/2003	
51	(no marking)	3:15	(unperformed)		
52	(no marking)	3:14	Alexander Abercrombie	4/12/2003	
53	A capriccio	1:59	(unperformed)		
54	(no marking)	4:17	(unperformed)		
55	(no marking)	2:43	(unperformed)		
56	Moderato	3:10	Alexander Hanysz	09/16/2023	
57	(no marking)	3:15	(unperformed)		
58	Leggiero	3:31	Alexander Hanysz	09/16/2023	
59	Quasi fantasia. Moderato	10:46	Fredrik Ullén	5/18/2003	
60	Saltando, leggiero	3:07	(unperformed)		
61	(no marking)	4:12	(unperformed)		
62	(no marking)	2:37	(unperformed)		
63	En forme de valse. Leggiero con disinvoltura	17:00	(unperformed)		
64	(no marking)	2:38	(unperformed)		
65	(no marking)	2:33	Fredrik Ullén	8/12/2003	
66	(no marking)	6:07	Nicola Ventrella	7/9/1996	
67	(no marking)	4:10	Fredrik Ullén	8/12/2003	
68	Sotto voce	2:28	(unperformed)		
69	La punta d’organo. Sotto voce	25:39	Florian Steininger	2/1/2014	
70	Rhythmes brisés	4:08	Alexander Abercrombie	4/12/2003	
71	Aria	13:14	Fredrik Ullén	8/8/2014	
72	Canonica. Marcato	2:11	Nicola Ventrella	12/19/1997	
73	Quasi Preludio-corale. Sonorità piena, morbida e dolcissima	17:57	Kentaro Noda	11/2/2008	
74	Ostinato. Secco	4:22	(unperformed)		
75	Passacaglia. Largo	28:50	Fredrik Ullén	8/17/2003	A passacaglia with 100 variations, a microcosm of the entire series of 100 etudes
76	Imitations. Presto assai	1:10	Nicola Ventrella	12/19/1997	
77	(no marking)	1:34	Nicola Ventrella	12/19/1997	
78	(no marking)	1:44	Ernest So	3/21/2020	
79	The inlaid line. Legatissimo il tema melodico	2:08	Jørgen Hald Nielsen	4/9/2011	
80	La linea melodica. Mormorando sordamente	5:46	Kentaro Noda	11/2/2008	
81	The Suspensions. Lento quasi Adagio e gravemente solenne	5:35	Nicola Ventrella	7/9/1996	
82	Sordamente e oscuramente minaccioso	2:28	(unperformed)		
83	Arpeggiated fourths	4:12	Nicola Ventrella	11/20/1999	
84	Tango habanera. Leggiero, con grazia indolente	8:00	Jonathan Powell	2/1/2003	
85	(no marking)	1:40	Nicola Ventrella	11/20/1999	
86	Adagietto. Legatissimo	2:20	Carlo Grante	1/23/1996	
87	Studio gammatico	3:15	(unperformed)		
88	(no marking)	1:20	Nicola Ventrella	12/19/1997	
89	Chopsticks. Vivace	1:20	Fredrik Ullén	8/12/2003	
90	(no marking)	3:00	(unperformed)		
91	Volante leggiero	1:45	(unperformed)		
92	Legato possible. Velato, misterioso	1:30	Fredrik Ullén	8/17/2003	
93	Leggiero, saltando	2:10	(unperformed)		
94	Ornaments. Con fantasia	3:30	Florian Steininger	2/15/2013	
95	(no marking)	0:45	Nicola Ventrella	11/20/1999	
96	(no marking)	2:50	Kentaro Noda	11/2/2008	
97	(no marking)	3:00	Kentaro Noda	7/19/2007	
98	Staccato e vivace	2:40	Kentaro Noda	7/19/2007	
99	Quasi fantasia. Scorrevole	16:05	Kentaro Noda	1/4/2006	An expansion on the fantasia from J. S. Bach’s Chromatic Fantasia and Fugue in D minor, BWV 903
100	Coda-finale. Fuga a cinque soggetti	56:00	Kentaro Noda	1/4/2006	The longest of the 100 etudes, this is a quintuple fugue which develops five themes extensively
