= Gulistan (Sorabji) =

Piano nocturne by Kaikhosru Shapurji Sorabji

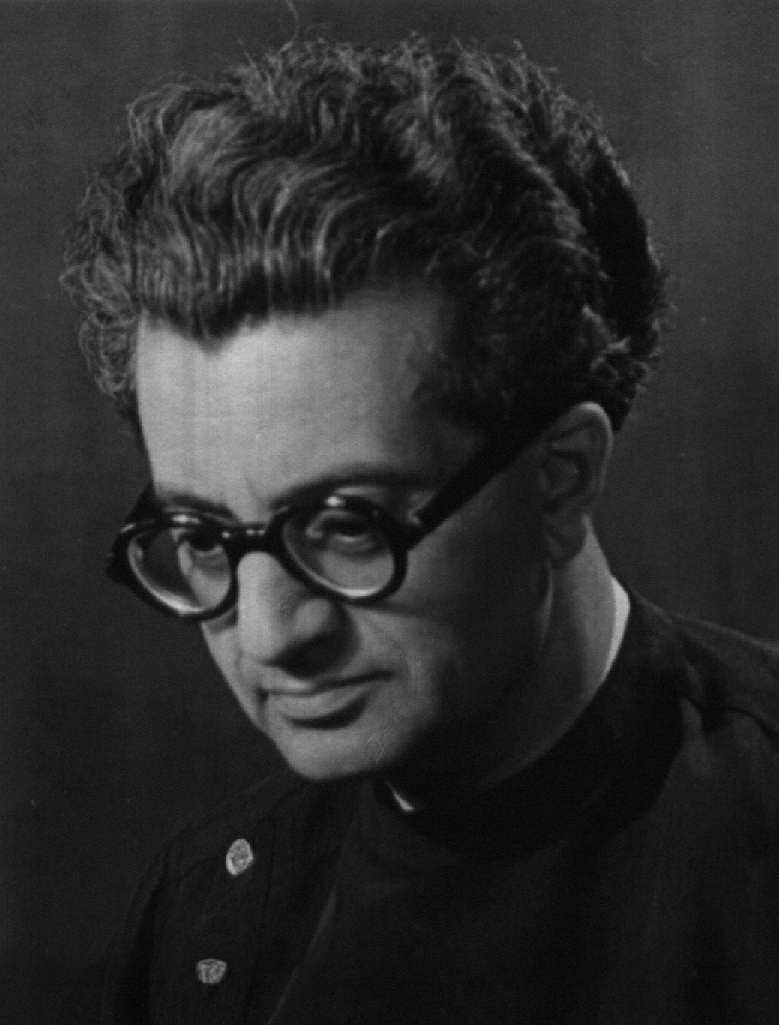
Kaikhosru Shapurji Sorabji, c. 1950

"Gulistān"—Nocturne for Piano, commonly known as Gulistan, is a piano piece by Kaikhosru Shapurji Sorabji written in 1940. Its title refers to Golestan ("Rose Garden"), a collection of poems and stories by 13th-century Persian poet and writer Sa'di. The piece lasts about 30 minutes in performance and is often considered to be one of Sorabji's greatest works.

== Background and composition ==
Persian poetry served as a source of inspiration for Sorabji throughout his life. Although not programmatic, Gulistān is inspired by Sa'di's (1210 – c. 1291) book Golestan ("Rose Garden"), parts of which Sorabji had set to music in his Trois poèmes du "Gulistān" de Saʿdī (1926, rev. 1930) for piano and baritone. Besides the reference to Sa'di's work, the preface in the manuscript also contains a quotation from South Wind, a 1917 novel by Norman Douglas.

Sorabji began work on Gulistān before 6 January 1940 and completed it on 13 August of the same year. Though originally dedicated to Frank Holliday, following the rupture of his friendship with Sorabji in 1979, the dedication was transferred to Sorabji's friend, the British poet, dramatist and translator Harold Morland, who, upon hearing the piece that same year, wrote: "This is no garden. But a spirit's Paradise."

== Music ==
Gulistān is written in Sorabji's "tropical nocturne" genre, which is often described as evoking a hothouse, rainforest or tropical heat. The opening of the piece introduces a sinuous, chromatic melody that reoccurs in various guises. Much of the piece uses series of diatonic chords (usually broken and heard in the lower registers), with the main ones having F, F♯, A or C as the root note, while the middle voices present chant-like melodies and the upper ones use chromatic figurations. Despite the active, highly intricate ornamental writing, the piece is to be played at a subdued volume throughout. About two-thirds of the way in, the ornamental writing is interrupted by a slow passage in three-part counterpoint, following which the earlier writing returns. The piece concludes with a reminiscence of the opening that ends on a low A.

== Recordings and assessment ==
Gulistān occupies a very prestigious position among Sorabji's works. Pianist and composer Jonathan Powell, discussing Sorabji's nocturnes, calls it "arguably his most successful essay in the genre". Pianist Michael Habermann describes it as a "superb, luscious piece", and musicologist Simon John Abrahams opines that it stands out among Sorabji's works "due to the remarkable integration of the texture and figuration, as well as the richness of the harmony". Musicologist Marc-André Roberge considers it "the most compelling work in Sorabji's entire production for the piano" and writes that "[its] gorgeousness is probably unmatched in the entire repertoire".

The work has been recorded commercially by Powell, Habermann and Charles Hopkins. Sorabji himself produced a private recording of the piece in 1962, which is considered more of an improvisation based on the score, given the liberties he took in his performance.

== Sources ==
- Abrahams, Simon John (2002). Le mauvais jardinier: A Reassessment of the Myths and Music of Kaikhosru Shapurji Sorabji (PhD). King's College London.
- Habermann, Michael (1995). "Strange Music: The World of Kaikhosru Sorabji" (PDF format). Piano Today, vol. 15, no. 6, p. 56. Retrieved 7 June 2020.
- Roberge, Marc-André (2019). Opus sorabjianum: The Life and Works of Kaikhosru Shapurji Sorabji (free download of the book in PDF format from its presentation page on the Sorabji Resource Site). Retrieved 22 October 2019.
