= Paul Rapoport (musicologist) =

Canadian musicologist and critic (born 1948)

- Born: 1948 (age 77–78); Toronto, Ontario, Canada
- Education: University of Michigan, 1970; University of Illinois Urbana-Champaign, 1972 and 1975
- Occupations: Musicologist, music critic, composer, professor

Paul Rapoport (born 1948) is a Canadian musicologist, music critic, composer and professor at McMaster University in Hamilton, Ontario.

== Biography ==
Rapoport was born in 1948 in Toronto, Ontario. He received his bachelor's degree in linguistics and music at the University of Michigan in 1970 and his master's degree at the University of Illinois Urbana-Champaign in 1972 with a thesis on Havergal Brian's Gothic Symphony. He went on to gain a doctorate at the same university in 1975, with a dissertation about Vagn Holmboe's four Symphonic Metamorphoses.

Part of the substantial collection of material related to composer Kaikhosru Shapurji Sorabji at McMaster University's library was obtained in 1988 through Rapoport's efforts. In addition to his work on Sorabji, he has been most associated with the music of Havergal Brian, Vagn Holmboe and Allan Pettersson as well as with various aspects of microtonal music. He has made use of microtones in his own compositions, which include a set of partsongs to poems by Erica Jong. As a critic he wrote mostly for the American magazine Fanfare, but also for Tempo, the American Record Guide, and others.

== Bibliography ==
=== Books ===
- Holmboe, Vagn (1991). Paul Rapoport (ed.). Experiencing Music: a composer's notes. Translated by Rapoport. London: Toccata Press. ISBN 0-907689-15-9.
- Rapoport, Paul; Truscott, Harold (1978). Havergal Brian's Gothic Symphony, Two Studies. Potters Bar, Hertfordshire, England: The Havergal Brian Society. ISBN 0-9505185-1-4.
- Rapoport, Paul (1979). Opus est : six composers from Northern Europe. New York: Taplinger. ISBN 0-8008-5844-1.
- Rapoport, Paul (1987). Songs of Fruits and Vegetables (for mixed choir a cappella on poems by Erica Jong). Utrecht: Diapason Press (Corpus microtonale No. 23).
- Rapoport, Paul, ed. (1992). Sorabji: A Critical Celebration. Aldershot, Hampshire, England: Scolar Press. ISBN 0-85967-923-3.
- Rapoport, Paul (1996). The compositions of Vagn Holmboe : a catalog of works and recordings with indexes of persons and titles. Copenhagen: Wilhelm Hansen. ISBN 87-598-0813-6.

=== Articles ===
- Johnson, Stephen (June 1992). "Review of Experiencing Music: a composer's notes". Tempo. 181 (181): 66–7. ISSN 0040-2982. JSTOR 945361.
- Rapoport, Paul (June 1976). "Sorabji and the Computer". Tempo. 117 (117): 23–26. doi:10.1017/S0040298200035002. ISSN 0040-2982. JSTOR 943040. S2CID 143438251.
- Rapoport, Paul (December 1978). "Roger Sessions: A Discography". Tempo. 127 (127): 17–20. doi:10.1017/S0040298200018362. ISSN 0040-2982. JSTOR 945955. S2CID 144679180.
- Rapoport, Paul (June 1986). "The Symphonies of Talivaldis Kenins". Tempo. 157 (157): 13–20. doi:10.1017/S0040298200022300. ISSN 0040-2982. JSTOR 945798. S2CID 145500247.
- Rapoport, Paul (Spring 1989). "Some Equal Temperaments are more equal than others ... and decidedly more temperamental". Musicworks (43): 8–12. ISSN 0225-686X.
- Rapoport, Paul (Autumn 1993). "The Structural Relationships of Fifths and Thirds in Equal Temperaments". Journal of Music Theory. 37 (2). Journal of Music Theory, Vol. 37, No. 2: 351–389. JSTOR 843787.
- Rapoport, Paul (October 1997). "Vainberg: Symphony No.17, Memory, Op.137. The Banners of Peace, Op.143 by USSR Radio Symphony Orchestra; Vladimir Fedoseyev; Moisey Vainberg. Vainberg: Symphonies – No.14, Op.117; No.18, War – There Is No Crueller Word, Op.138 by USSR Radio Symphony Orchestra; Vladimir Fedoseyev; Latvian State Academic Choir; Imants Tsepitis; Moisey Vainberg". Tempo. 202 (202): 30–31. ISSN 0040-2982. JSTOR 945768.
- Rapoport, Paul; Beyer, Anders (June 1997). "Review of Anders Beyer's The Music of Per Nørgård: Fourteen Interpretative Essays". Notes. Second Series. 53 (4). Notes, Vol. 53, No. 4: 1170–1. doi:10.2307/899479. JSTOR 899479.
- Rapoport, Paul (January 2001). "Review of Donemus Recording of Röntgen Concertos". Tempo. 215 (215): 64. ISSN 0040-2982. JSTOR 946659.
- Rapoport, Paul (October 2006). "A Soviet Credo: Shostakovich's Fourth Symphony by Pauline Fairclough. Ashgate, £55.00. SHOSTAKOVICH: Symphony No. 4, composer's arrangement for two pianos. Rustem Hayroudinoff, Colin Stone (pnos). Chandos CHAN 10296. SHOSTAKOVICH: New Collected Works, Vol. 4. Symphony No. 4, orchestral score, edited by Manashir Yakubov. DSCH Publishers, 2003. SHOSTAKOVICH: New Collected Works, Vol. 19. Symphony No. 4, composer's arrangement for two pianos, edited by Manashir Yakubov. DSCH Publishers, 2000". Tempo. 60 (238): 76–80. doi:10.1017/S0040298206230328.
- Wright, David; Rapoport, Paul (July 1993). "Review of Sorabji: A Critical Celebration". The Musical Times. 134 (1805). The Musical Times, Vol. 134, No. 1805: 397. doi:10.2307/1003097. JSTOR 1003097.
