= Fredrik Ullén =

Swedish pianist and cognitive neuroscientist

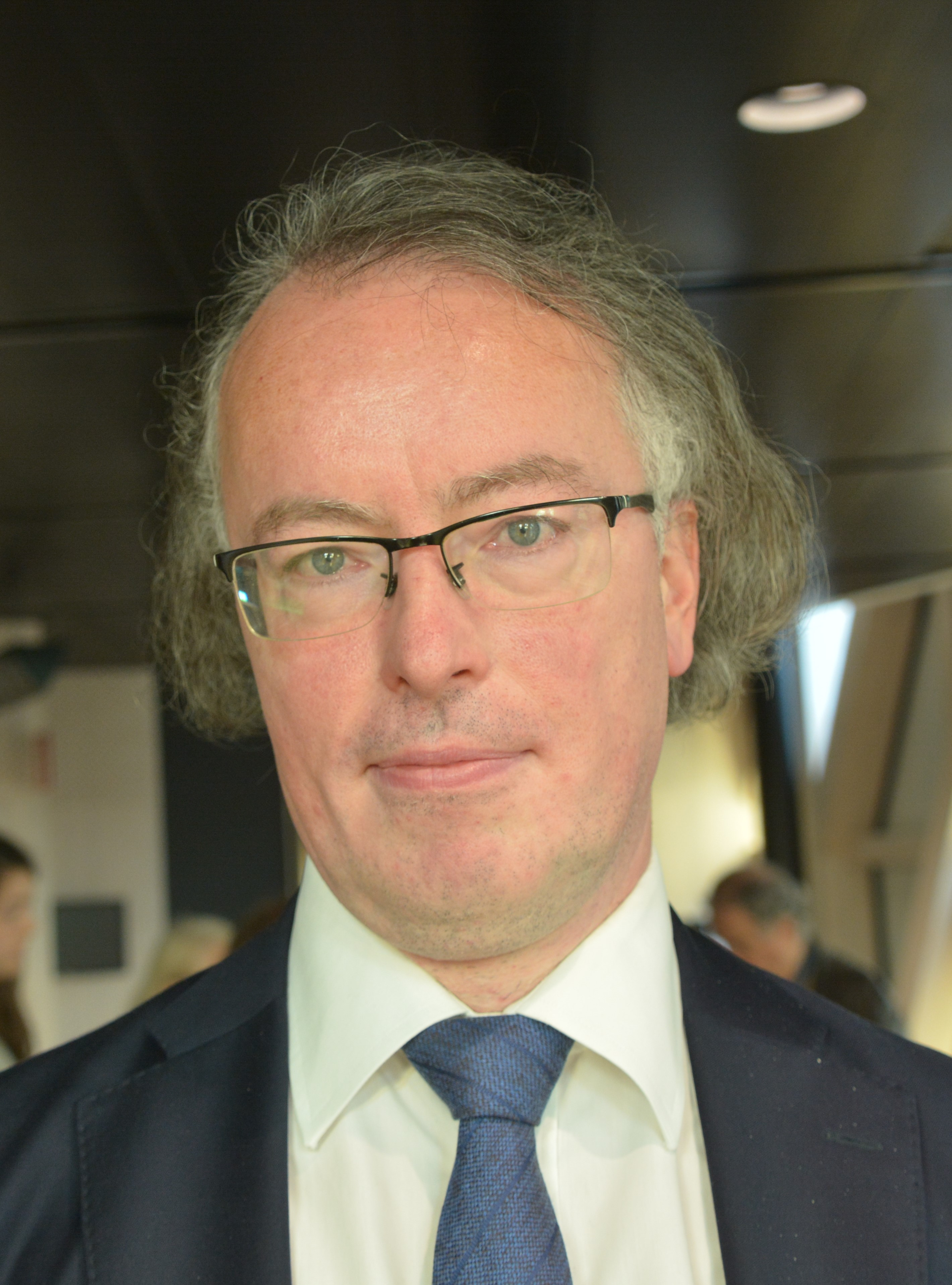
- Born: April 13, 1968 (age 58); Västerås, Sweden
- Education: Karolinska Institutet; Royal College of Music, Stockholm
- Known for: Neuroscience of expertise and creativity; concert pianist, recordings of György Ligeti and Kaikhosru Shapurji Sorabji
- Awards: American Mensa Foundation Prize (2025); Philip Sandblom Prize, Lund University (2023); Honorary Doctorate, Mälardalen University (2022); Karolinska Institutet Culture Prize (2022)
- Scientific career
- Fields: Cognitive neuroscience, Classical piano
- Workplaces: Karolinska Institutet; Max Planck Institute for Empirical Aesthetics

Fredrik Ullén (born 13 April 1968 in Västerås, Sweden) is a Swedish cognitive neuroscientist and concert pianist. He is internationally known for his recordings of complex piano repertoire — including the complete works of György Ligeti and Kaikhosru Shapurji Sorabji’s 100 Transcendental Studies — as well as for research on the neuroscience, psychology, and behavioral genetics of music, creativity, and flow.

== Early life and education ==
Ullén studied medicine at the Karolinska Institutet in Stockholm (1985–1987) before earning a Master of Performing Arts in solo piano at the Royal College of Music, Stockholm in 1990. He earned a PhD in neuroscience at Karolinska Institutet in 1996, with a thesis focused on the neural mechanisms of visuomotor orientation and locomotion.

== Musical career ==
Ullén is acclaimed for tackling some of the most technically demanding piano literature. His recordings of the complete piano music of György Ligeti on BIS Records (2006), including the world première of the second book of Études, were described as “a triumph of interpretation as well as recording” (Gramophone), and earned distinctions such as *Diapason d’or*, *CHOC* (Le Monde de la Musique) and *Stern des Monats* (FonoForum).

Another major project is his complete recording of Sorabji’s 100 Transcendental Studies (BIS, 2000–2020), which has received international awards and praise. The final volume features an hour-long fugue, described in the liner notes as “joining a comet … and finally returning back to mother earth”. Critics have noted that Ullén’s dual career as a neuroscientist enriches his interpretations.

He is represented as a soloist on around 25 CDs, and his discography also includes works by Liszt, Messiaen, Chopin, Kurtág, Schubert and John Pickard. Notably, he has made the world première recording of Max Reger’s Chopin paraphrases, Fünf Specialstudien. He performs worldwide and has given master classes, among others at the Sibelius Academy, Liszt Academy Budapest, Northwestern University (Chicago), and the Royal College of Music, Stockholm.

World premières include pieces by composers Kati Agócs, Barnabás Dukay, George Flynn, Adriano Guarnieri, Fredrik Hedelin, Kim Hedås, Barnabás Horváth, Sten Melin, Kent Olofsson, and Kaikhosru Sorabji.

== Academic career ==
After postdoctoral research at Karolinska Institutet and the Royal Institute of Technology, Ullén became Associate Professor in 2006 and Professor of Cognitive Neuroscience at Karolinska Institutet in 2010. Since 2021 he has been a Scientific Member of the Max Planck Society and Director of the Department of Cognitive Neuropsychology at the Max Planck Institute for Empirical Aesthetics.

His research has a strong focus on the biological mechanisms of skill learning, expertise and creativity, which his laboratory primarily investigates using music as a model domain. Other research interests include neuroaesthetics, flow, temporal processing in music and language, and the underpinnings of associations between cultural engagement, well-being and health. His laboratory is highly interdisciplinary, and combines studies of the brain using structural and functional neuroimaging, with behavior genetics and experimental psychology.

Ullén’s group has demonstrated practice-related increases in white-matter connectivity in motor and auditory pathways in musicians and characterized brain mechanisms for creative cognition during musical improvisation. His team is actively leading studies of the genomics of music and has performed extensive behavior genetic studies of musical expertise, which have unravelled how the acquisition of expertise depends on a complex interplay between practice, genetic factors and the environment. Another related research line concerns the genetic and neurobiological links between creative engagement and psychiatric disease. He also studies the physiological underpinnings of the experience of flow and has demonstrated that flow in daily life may have causal positive effects on well-being and health.

== Leadership and service ==
Ullén led the Center for Culture, Cognition and Health at Karolinska Institutet (2017–2021). He is a fellow of the Max Planck School of Cognition and a member of the Interdisciplinary Center for Neuroscience Frankfurt.

== Honours and awards ==
- American Mensa Foundation Prize (2025) for research on the neuroscience of expertise.
- Philip Sandblom Prize, Lund University (2023).
- Honorary Doctorate, Mälardalen University (2022).
- Karolinska Institutet Culture Prize (2022).
- Fellow of the Academia Europaea (2017).
- Fellow of the Royal Swedish Academy of Music (2007).
- Scientific Member of the Max Planck Society (2021).

== Selected publications ==
- Wesseldijk LW, Ullén F, et al. (2024). "Notes from Beethoven’s genome". Current Biology, 34(6), R233–R234.
- Gaston E., Ullén F., Wesseldijk L.W., Mosing M.A. (2024). "Can flow proneness be protective against mental and cardiovascular health problems?" Translational Psychiatry, 14(1), 144.
- Niarchou M. et al. (2022). "Genome-wide association study of musical beat synchronization demonstrates high polygenicity". Nature Human Behaviour, 6, 1292–1309.
- de Manzano Ö., Ullén F. (2018). "Same genes, different brains". Cerebral Cortex, 28(1), 387–394.
- Ullén F., Hambrick D.Z., Mosing M.A. (2016). "Rethinking expertise: a multifactorial gene–environment interaction model". Psychological Bulletin, 142(4), 427–46.
- Bengtsson S.L. et al. (2005). "Extensive piano practicing has regionally specific effects on white matter development". Nature Neuroscience, 8, 1148–1150.
