= List of piano composers =

This is a list of piano composers.

== Renaissance and Baroque periods ==
- Domenico Alberti (1710–1740)
- Johann Sebastian Bach (1685–1750)
- William Byrd (c.1540-1623)
- Louis Couperin (c.1626-1661)
- François Couperin (1668–1733)
- Louis-Claude Daquin (1694–1772)
- Girolamo Frescobaldi (1583-1643)
- Johann Jacob Froberger (1616-1667)
- Baldassare Galuppi (1706–1785)
- Orlando Gibbons (1583-1625)
- Lodovico Giustini (1685–1743)
- Christoph Graupner (1683–1760)
- George Frideric Handel (1685–1759)
- Johann Kuhnau (1660-1722)
- Johann Pachelbel (1653-1706)
- Giuseppe Antonio Paganelli (1710-1762)
- Domenico Paradies (1707-1791)
- Giovanni Benedetto Platti (1697–1763)
- Henry Purcell (1659–1695)
- Jean-Philippe Rameau (1683–1764)
- Alessandro Scarlatti (1660-1725)
- Domenico Scarlatti (1685–1757)
- Georg Philipp Telemann (1681–1767)
- Antonio Vivaldi (1678–1741)

== Classical period ==
- Louis Adam (1758–1848)
- Bonifazio Asioli (1769–1832)
- Carl Philipp Emanuel Bach (1714–1788)
- Johann Christian Bach (1735–1782)
- Johann Christoph Friedrich Bach (1732–1795)
- Wilhelm Friedemann Bach (1710–1784)
- Carlos Baguer (1768-1808)
- Franz Ignaz Beck (1734–1809)
- Ludwig van Beethoven (1770–1827)
- Georg Benda (1722–1795)
- Ludwig Berger (1777–1839)
- João Domingos Bomtempo (1775–1842)
- Domenico Cimarosa (1749–1801)
- Muzio Clementi (1752–1832)
- Philip Cogan (1750–1833)
- Johann Baptist Cramer (1771–1858)
- Franz Danzi (1763–1826)
- Carl Ditters von Dittersdorf (1739–1799)
- František Xaver Dušek (1731–1799)
- Jan Ladislav Dussek (1760–1812)
- Anton Eberl (1765–1807)
- Józef Elsner (1769–1854)
- Joseph Leopold Eybler (1765–1846)
- Giacomo Gotifredo Ferrari (1763–1842)
- Emanuel Aloys Förster (1748–1823)
- Joseph Gelinek (1758–1825)
- Tommaso Giordani (1730–1806)
- Johann Wilhelm Hässler (1747–1822)
- Joseph Haydn (1732–1809)
- Franz Anton Hoffmeister (1754–1812)
- James Hook (1746–1827)
- Johann Nepomuk Hummel (1778–1837)
- Louis-Emmanuel Jadin (1768–1853)
- Hyacinthe Jadin (1776–1800)
- Leopold Kozeluch (1747–1818)
- Joseph Martin Kraus (1756–1792)
- Franz Krommer (1759–1831)
- Nikolaus von Krufft (1779–1818)
- Joseph Küffner (1776–1856)
- Francesca Lebrun (1756–1791)
- Marianna Martines (1744–1812)
- Étienne Méhul (1763–1817)
- Hélène de Montgeroult (1764–1836)
- Leopold Mozart (1719–1787)
- Wolfgang Amadeus Mozart (1756–1791)
- August Eberhard Müller (1767–1817)
- Josef Mysliveček (1737–1781)
- Johann Gottlieb Naumann (1741–1801)
- Christian Gottlob Neefe (1748–1798)
- Sigismund von Neukomm (1778–1858)
- Giovanni Paisiello (1740–1816)
- Ignaz Pleyel (1757–1831)
- Johann Friedrich Reichardt (1752–1814)
- Anton Reicha (1770–1836)
- Antonio Rosetti (1750–1792)
- Friedrich Wilhelm Rust (1739–1796)
- Antonio Salieri (1750–1825)
- Johann Schobert (1735–1767)
- Johann Samuel Schroeter (1753–1788)
- Joseph Anton Steffan (1726-1797)
- Antonio Soler (1729–1783)
- Fernando Sor (1778–1839)
- Daniel Steibelt (1765–1823)
- Johann Franz Xaver Sterkel (1750–1817)
- Johann Baptist Wanhal (1739–1813)
- Václav Jan Tomášek (1774–1850)
- Daniel Gottlob Türk (1750–1813)
- Samuel Wesley (1766–1837)
- Christoph Ernst Friedrich Weyse (1774–1842)
- Johann Wilhelm Wilms (1772–1847)
- Joseph Wölfl (1773–1812)
- Paul Wranitzky (1756–1808)

== Romantic period ==
- Charles-Valentin Alkan (1813–1888)
- Anton Arensky (1861–1906)
- Tekla Bądarzewska (1829/1834 – 1861)
- Mily Balakirev (1837–1910)
- Friedrich Baumfelder (1836–1916)
- Amy Beach (1867–1944)
- Franz Bendel (1832–1874)
- William Sterndale Bennett (1816–1875)
- Peter Benoit (1834–1901)
- Wilhelm Berger (1861–1911)
- Henri Bertini (1798–1876)
- Felix Blumenfeld (1863–1931)
- Charles Samuel Bovy-Lysberg (1821–1873)
- Johannes Brahms (1833–1897)
- Friedrich Burgmüller (1806–1874)
- Hans von Bülow (1830–1894)
- Ignacio Cervantes (1847–1905)
- Emmanuel Chabrier (1841–1894)
- Cécile Chaminade (1857–1944)
- Frédéric Chopin (1810–1849)
- Aloÿs Claussmann (1850–1926)
- Carl Czerny (1791–1857)
- Eugen d'Albert (1864–1932)
- Élie-Miriam Delaborde (1839–1913)
- Charles Delioux (1825–1915)
- Anton Diabelli (1781–1858)
- Theodor Döhler (1814–1856)
- Gaetano Donizetti (1797–1848)
- Alexander Dreyschock (1818–1869)
- Felix Dreyschock (1860–1906)
- Antonín Dvořák (1841–1904)
- Michele Esposito (1855–1929)
- Gabriel Fauré (1845–1924)
- Zdeněk Fibich (1850-1900)
- John Field (1782–1837)
- Julian Fontana (1810–1869)
- Adolfo Fumagalli (1828–1856)
- Mikhail Glinka (1804–1857)
- Henri Gobbi (1842–1920)
- Benjamin Godard (1849–1895)
- Louis Moreau Gottschalk (1829–1869)
- Edvard Grieg (1843–1907)
- Agathe Backer Grøndahl (1847-1907)
- Cornelius Gurlitt (1820–1901)
- Adolphe Gutmann (1819–1882)
- Charles-Louis Hanon (1819–1900)
- Stephen Heller (1813–1888)
- Swan Hennessy (1866–1929)
- Adolf von Henselt (1814–1889)
- Fanny Hensel (1805–1847)
- Ferdinand Hérold (1791–1833)
- Henri Herz (1803–1888)
- Franz Hitz (1828–1891)
- Ferdinand Hiller (1811–1885)
- Franz Hünten (1792–1878)
- Salomon Jadassohn (1831–1902)
- Alfred Jaëll (1832–1882)
- Marie Jaëll (1846-1925)
- Scott Joplin (1868-1917)
- Rafael Joseffy (1852–1915)
- Friedrich Kalkbrenner (1785–1849)
- Jan Kalivoda (1801–1866)
- Joseph Christoph Kessler (1800–1872)
- Theodor Kirchner (1823–1903)
- Anton de Kontski (1817–1899)
- Wilhelm Kuhe (1823–1912)
- Friedrich Kuhlau (1786–1832)
- Theodor Kullak (1818–1882)
- Franz Lachner (1803–1890)
- Théodore Lack (1846–1921)
- Franz Liszt (1811–1886)
- Henry Litolff (1818–1891)
- Sergei Lyapunov (1859–1924)
- Mykola Lysenko (1842-1912)
- Edward MacDowell (1860–1908)
- George Alexander Macfarren (1813–1887)
- Giuseppe Martucci (1856–1909)
- Désiré Magnus (1828–1884)
- Antoine François Marmontel (1816–1898)
- William Mason (1829–1908)
- Felix Mendelssohn (1809–1847)
- Amédée Méreaux (1802–1874)
- Aleksander Michalowski (1851–1938)
- Ignaz Moscheles (1794–1870)
- Moritz Moszkowski (1854–1925)
- Franz Xaver Mozart (1791–1844)
- Modest Mussorgsky (1839–1881)
- Vítězslav Novák (1870–1949)
- Joseph O'Kelly (1828–1885)
- Arthur O'Leary (1834–1919)
- George Onslow (1784–1853)
- Paul Pabst (1854–1897)
- Jan Gerard Palm (1831–1906)
- Cipriani Potter (1792–1871)
- Émile Prudent (1817–1863)
- Alfred Quidant (1815–1893)
- Sergei Rachmaninoff (1873–1943)
- Joachim Raff (1822–1882)
- Max Reger (1873–1916)
- Carl Reinecke (1824–1910)
- Julius Reubke (1834–1858)
- Josef Rheinberger (1819-1901)
- Ferdinand Ries (1784-1838)
- Julius Rietz (1812–1877)
- Nikolai Rimsky-Korsakov (1844–1908)
- Anton Rubinstein (1829–1894)
- Camille Saint-Saëns (1835–1921)
- Wassily Sapellnikoff (1867–1941)
- Xaver Scharwenka (1850–1924)
- Aloys Schmitt (1788–1866)
- Friedrich Schneider (1786–1853)
- Franz Schubert (1797–1828)
- Julius Schulhoff (1825–1898)
- Clara Schumann (1819–1896)
- Robert Schumann (1810–1856)
- Ludvig Schytte (1848–1909)
- Giovanni Sgambati (1841–1914)
- Jean Sibelius (1865–1957)
- Bedřich Smetana (1824–1884)
- Sydney Smith (1839–1889)
- Charles Villiers Stanford (1852–1924)
- Camille-Marie Stamaty (1811–1870)
- Wilhelm Taubert (1811–1891)
- Karl Tausig (1841–1871)
- Pyotr Ilyich Tchaikovsky (1840–1893)
- Thomas Tellefsen (1823–1874)
- Sigismond Thalberg (1812–1871)
- Jan Václav Voříšek (1791–1825)
- Carl Maria von Weber (1786–1826)
- Józef Wieniawski (1837–1912)
- Aleksander Zarzycki (1834–1895)
- Władysław Żeleński (1837–1921)

== 20th century ==
Composer	Born	Died	Nationality	Notable piano works	Remarks
Nicanor Abelardo	1893	1934	Filipino		
Theodor Adorno	1903	1969	German		
Miguel del Aguila	1957		Uruguayan-American	Toccata; Sonata No.2; Conga; Nocturne	
Roy Agnew	1891	1944	Australian		
Isaac Albéniz	1860	1909	Spanish	Iberia	
Willem Andriessen	1887	1964	Dutch		
Samuel Barber	1910	1981	American	Concerto for Piano and Orchestra op.38 (1962); Nocturne for Piano (Homage to John Field), Op. 33; Sonata for Piano (Op. 26, 1949)	
Béla Bartók	1881	1945	Hungarian	Mikrokosmos, Sz. 107, BB 105; Out of Doors, Sz. 81, BB 89; Romanian Folk Dances, Sz. 56, BB 68; Allegro barbaro, Sz. 49, BB 63	Folksong-influenced, Centric, Modal, Polymodal/Polytonal
Arnold Bax	1883	1953	English	Piano Sonata No. 1 (1910, 1917–1920); Piano Sonata No. 2 (1919); Piano Sonata in E♭ (1921); Piano Sonata No. 3 (1926); Piano Sonata No. 4 (1932)	Romantic, Impressionist
Emile-Robert Blanchet	1877	1943	Swiss		
Sergei Bortkiewicz	1877	1952	Ukrainian		
York Bowen	1884	1961	English		Romantic
Frank Bridge	1912	1941	English		Late-Romantic, hints of Second Viennese School
Ferruccio Busoni	1866	1924	Italian	Fantasia contrappuntistica (1910)	Mature works of indeterminate key; Late in career, neoclassical
Alfredo Casella	1883	1947	Italian		
Cécile Chaminade	1857	1944	French		
Mikalojus Konstantinas Čiurlionis	1875	1911	Lithuanian	Piano Sonata in F major; Nocturne in C♯ minor; Nocturne in F minor; Impromptu in F♯ minor	
Aaron Copland	1900	1990	American	Appalachian Spring; Salon Mexico; Quiet City	
Claude Debussy	1862	1918	French	Études, L 136; Préludes (L 117 and L 123); Suite bergamasque, L 75; Deux arabesques, L 66	Impressionist
Bill Evans	1929	1980	American		Jazz
Ernst von Dohnanyi	1877	1960	Hungarian	Four Rhapsodies, op. 11	
Duke Ellington	1899	1974	American		Jazz
Samuil Feinberg	1890	1962	Russian		
Ossip Gabrilowitsch	1878	1936	Russian, American		
George Gershwin	1898	1937	American	Three Preludes; George Gershwin's Songbook	Jazz-influenced
Alberto Ginastera	1916	1983	Argentine		Earlier works often integrate Argentine folk themes; later works increasingly abstracted
Alexander Glazunov	1865	1936	Russian		Romantic
Leopold Godowsky	1870	1938	Polish, American	Studies on Chopin's Études (1894–1914)	
Percy Grainger	1882	1961	Australian, English, American		
Enrique Granados	1867	1916	Spanish		Distinctly Spanish
Alexander Gretchaninov	1864	1956	Russian		
Gabriel Grovlez	1879	1944	French		
Vladimir Horowitz	1903	1989	Ukrainian, American		
Charles Ives	1874	1954	American	Piano Sonata No. 2 (Concord Sonata) (1916–1919)	
Scott Joplin	1867	1917	American		Ragtime
Dmitri Kabalevsky	1904	1987	Russian, Soviet		
Aram Khachaturian	1903	1978	Soviet, Armenian		
Viktor Kosenko	1896	1938	Ukrainian		
Joseph Lamb	1887	1960	American		Ragtime
Constant Lambert	1905	1951	English	Piano Sonata (1928–1929); Suite in 3 Movements (1925); Elegiac Blues (1927)	
Ernesto Lecuona	1895	1963	Cuban		
André Mathieu	1929	1968	Canadian	Concerto Romantique (Concerto de Québec, 1943); Piano Concerto No. 4 (1947)	Romantic
Nikolai Medtner	1880	1951	Russian		
Erkki Melartin	1875	1937	Finnish		
Olivier Messiaen	1908	1992	French	Vingt regards sur l'enfant-Jésus (1944); Quatre études de rythme (1949–1950); Catalogue d'oiseaux (1956–1958)	
Federico Mompou	1893	1987	Catalan, Spanish		
Thelonious Monk	1917	1982	American		Jazz
Nikolai Myaskovsky	1881	1950	Russian, Soviet		
Ernesto Nazareth	1863	1934	Brazilian		Eclectic influences; primarily dance music (tangos, waltzes, polkas, etc.), influenced by African and Argentine styles
Walter Niemann	1876	1953	German		Impressionist and exotic influences
Ignacy Jan Paderewski	1860	1941	Polish		
Jacobo Palm	1887	1982	Curaçao-born		
John Palm	1885	1925	Curaçao-born		
Rudolph Palm	1880	1950	Curaçao-born		
Selim Palmgren	1878	1951	Finnish		
Isidor Philipp	1863	1958	French, Hungarian		
Francis Poulenc	1899	1963	French		
Florence Price	1887	1953	African American		
Sergei Prokofiev	1891	1953	Russian	Sonata No. 6 in A major, Op. 82 (1940); Sonata No. 7 in B♭ major, Op. 83 (1942); Sonata No. 8 in B♭ major, Op. 84 (1944); Visions fugitives, Op. 22 (1915–1917); Toccata in D minor, Op. 11 (1912)	
Sergei Rachmaninoff	1873	1943	Russian	Sonata No. 1 in D minor, Op. 28 (1908); Sonata No. 2 in B♭ minor, Op. 36 (1914); Six moments musicaux, Op. 16 (1897)	Romantic
Maurice Ravel	1875	1937	French	Gaspard de la nuit (1908); Le tombeau de Couperin (1914–1917); Jeux d'eau (1901)	Impressionist; sometimes jazz-influenced
Vladimir Rebikov	1866	1920	Russian		Impressionist, Romantic
Hugo Reinhold	1857	1935	Austrian		Romantic
Emmanuel Rhené-Baton	1879	1940	French		
Jean Roger-Ducasse	1873	1954	French		
Julius Röntgen	1855	1932	Dutch		
Erik Satie	1866	1925	French		Impressionist; Minimalist (precursor)
Ahmed Adnan Saygun	1907	1991	Turkish		Neoclassical, traditional Turkish folksong influence
Florent Schmitt	1870	1958	French		Impressionist, Late-Romantic
Arnold Schoenberg	1874	1951	Austrian, American	Drei Klavierstücke, Op. 11; Fünf Klavierstücke, Op. 23; Sechs Kleine Klavierstücke, Op. 19; Suite für Klavier, Op. 25	Serial (mature/late career), Late-Romantic (early career)
James Scott	1885	1938	American, African-American		Ragtime
Alexander Scriabin	1872	1915	Russian	10 piano sonatas	Late-Romantic (early); Atonal, Mystical (mature)
Verdina Shlonsky	1905	1990	Israeli	Still Life; Pages from the Diary; Youth Suite; Five Sketches; Reflection	Polystylism
Dmitri Shostakovich	1906	1975	Russian, Soviet	Piano Sonata No. 1, Op. 12 (1926); 24 Preludes, Op. 34 (1932–1933); Piano Sonata No. 2 in B minor, Op. 61 (1943); 24 Preludes and Fugues, Op. 87 (1950–1951)	Post-Romantic; neoclassical; elements of grotesque
Jean Sibelius	1865	1957	Finnish	Sonata in F major, Op. 12; Three Sonatinas, Op. 67	Late-Romantic; post-Romantic
Kaikhosru Shapurji Sorabji	1892	1988	English	Opus clavicembalisticum; 100 Transcendental Studies; Sequentia cyclica super "Dies irae" ex Missa pro defunctis; Piano Symphony No. 2; "Gulistān"—Nocturne for Piano	Neoclassical, neoromantic, postimpressionistic
Enrique Soro	1884	1954	Chilean	Gran concierto en Re Mayor para piano y orquesta	Late-Romantic; post-Romantic
Alexei Stanchinsky	1888	1914	Russian		Post-Romantic, modal
Wilhelm Stenhammar	1871	1927	Swedish		
Richard Strauss	1864	1949	German	Burleske for Piano and Orchestra	
Igor Stravinsky	1882	1971	Russian, French, American	Piano Sonata in F♯ minor; Quatre études, Op. 7; Piano-Rag-Music; Trois mouvements de Petrouchka	Post-Romantic (early); Neoclassical (middle); Serial (late career)
Soulima Stravinsky	1910	1994	Swiss, American		Igor Stravinsky son
Harald Sæverud	1897	1992	Norwegian	Slåtter og stev fra Siljustøl, Op. 21; Sonatinas, Op. 30	Late-Romantic; post-Romantic; neo-classical
Tōru Takemitsu	1930	1996	Japanese		Eclectic, with influences ranging from jazz, popular music, avant-garde procedures, and traditional Japanese music; strongly influenced by Debussy and Messiaen
Eduard Tubin	1905	1982	Estonian		
Joaquin Turina	1882	1949	Spanish		
Galina Ustvolskaya	1919	2006	Russian		Eclectic
David Vaughan Thomas	1873	1934	Welsh		Nationalist
Heitor Villa-Lobos	1887	1959	Brazilian	Bachianas Brasileiras No. 4; Rudepoêma (1921–1926)	
Ángel Villoldo	1861	1919	Argentine		Tango
Pancho Vladigerov	1899	1978	Bulgarian		
Fats Waller	1904	1943	American		Jazz
Henry Cowell	1897	1965	American		Avant-garde, tone cluster

== Contemporary ==
- Philip Aaberg (born 1949)
- Thomas Adès (born 1971)
- Lera Auerbach (born 1973)
- Nicolas Bacri (born 1961)
- Rich Batsford (born 1969)
- Giorgio Battistelli (born 1953)
- Jason Charles Beck (born 1972)
- Luciano Berio (1925–2003)
- Bart Berman (born 1938)
- Dave Brubeck (1920–2012)
- Dimitrije Bužarovski (born 1952)
- Cornelius Cardew (1936–1981)
- Roberto Carnevale (born 1966)
- Unsuk Chin (born 1961)
- Artur Cimirro (born 1982)
- Aldo Clementi (1925–2011)
- Julian Cochran (born 1974)
- Chick Corea (1941–2021)
- George Crumb (1929–2022)
- Norman Dello Joio (1913–2008)
- Alma Deutscher (born 2005)
- Franco Donatoni (1927–2000)
- James Douglas (1932–2022)
- Tan Dun (born 1957)
- George Duke (1946–2013)
- Julius Eastman (1940–1990)
- Ludovico Einaudi (born 1955)
- Tanya Ekanayaka (born 1977)
- Roger Evernden (born 1954)
- Mohammed Fairouz (born 1985)
- Morton Feldman (1926–1987)
- Lorenzo Ferrero (born 1951)
- Graham Fitkin (born 1963)
- Carlo Forlivesi (born 1971)
- Nils Frahm (born 1982)
- Ola Gjeilo (born 1978)
- Philip Glass (born 1937)
- Chilly Gonzales (born 1972)
- Henryk Górecki (1933–2010)
- Robert Greenberg (born 1954)
- Christian Grøvlen (born 1990)
- Marc-André Hamelin (born 1961)
- Herbie Hancock (born 1940)
- Ichiko Hashimoto (born 1952)
- Kenneth Hesketh (born 1968)
- Alistair Hinton (born 1950)
- Joe Hisaishi (born 1950)
- Christopher Hobbs (born 1950)
- Stephen Hough (born 1961)
- Abdullah Ibrahim (1934–2026)
- Airat Ichmouratov (born 1973)
- Keith Jarrett (born 1945)
- Aivars Kalējs (born 1951)
- Shigeru Kan-no (born 1959)
- Nikolai Kapustin (1937–2020)
- Elena Kats-Chernin (born 1957)
- Pierre Kolp (born 1969)
- Martin Kutnowski (born 1968)
- György Ligeti (1923–2006)
- Ji Liu (born 1990)
- Frederik Magle (born 1977)
- Klaus Mertens (born 1973)
- Fred Momotenko (born 1970)
- Conlon Nancarrow (1912–1997)
- David Nevue (born 1965)
- Luka Okros (born 1991)
- Yukie Nishimura (born 1967)
- Christopher Norton (born 1953)
- Michael Nyman (born 1944)
- Chris Opperman (born 1978)
- Michael Parsons (born 1938)
- David Pentecost (born 1940)
- Wolfgang Plagge (born 1960)
- Tomi Räisänen (born 1976)
- Jan Randall (born 1952)
- Anirudh Ravichander (born 1990)
- Dino Residbegovic (born 1975)
- Max Richter (born 1966)
- Diana Ringo (born 1992)
- Arturo Rodas (born 1954)
- Alexander Rosenblatt (born 1956)
- Lee Ru-ma a.k.a. Yiruma (born 1978)
- Bernhard Ruchti (born 1974)
- Frederic Rzewski (1938–2021)
- Ryuichi Sakamoto (1952–2023)
- Fazıl Say (born 1970)
- Giacinto Scelsi (1905–1988)
- Avi Schönfeld (born 1947)
- Jon Schmidt (born 1966)
- Salvatore Sciarrino (born 1947)
- Peter Seabourne (born 1960)
- Rodion Konstantinovich Shchedrin (1932–2025)
- Yoko Shimomura (born 1967)
- Gregory Short (1938–1999)
- Hugh Shrapnel (born 1947)
- Arlene Sierra (born 1970)
- Howard Skempton (born 1947)
- Dave Smith (born 1949)
- Karlheinz Stockhausen (1928–2007)
- Ananda Sukarlan (born 1968)
- William Susman (born 1960)
- Yuji Takahashi (born 1938)
- Karen Tanaka (born 1961)
- Jennifer Thomas (born 1977)
- Robert Scott Thompson (born 1959)
- Yann Tiersen (born 1970)
- Julia Tsenova (1948–2010)
- Pēteris Vasks (born 1946)
- Carl Verbraeken (born 1950)
- Carl Vine (born 1954)
- Ezequiel Viñao (born 1960)
- John White (1936–2024)
- George Winston (1949–2023)
- Yehuda Yannay (1937–2023)
- Yanni (born 1954)
- Joji Yuasa (1929–2024)
- Yitzhak Yedid (born 1971)
- Isang Yun (1917–1995)
- Yoshiki (born 1965)
- Edson Zampronha (born 1963)
- Joe Zawinul (1932–2007)
- Ralph Zurmühle (born?)
