= List of compositions by Alexandre Goria =

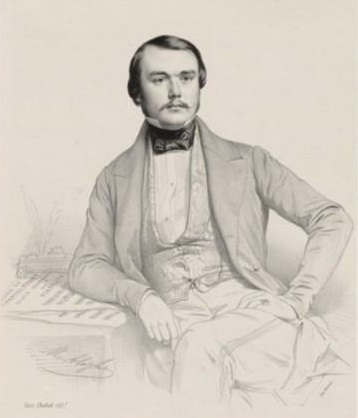
Alexandre Goria

This is the list of compositions by Alexandre Goria who wrote about 130 drawing-room pieces among polkas, berceuses, nocturnes, waltzes, rêvéries, and his Serenade for the left hand, which became widely known during his active years. Among his 31 grand études, those in Opp. 72 and 63 were highly praised by every audience. He also wrote barcarolles, fantasies and mazurkas, and a good number of characteristic and genre pieces one quotes from memory are the beautiful Allegrezza, l'Attente, Le Calme, lighter works indeed but which have a real cachet of originality. His transcriptions of selected motifs from several operas such as Souvenires du Théâtre Italien, Belisario, Il Trovatore, Le Pardon de Ploërmel, Montenegrins, Una Furtiva Lagrima, all cleverly written, prove the great popularity of his name which had real commercial value.

Goria distinguished himself among all the virtuosos of his generation by the beautiful sound which he drew from the piano without brutalizing the instrument and by applying only enough pressure on the keyboard to obtained a breadth of sound which belonged to him. He used the pedal with great art and tact and also knew how to oppose the happy contrasts of softness and grace to the powerful effects that he possessed better than any pianist. A favorite artist of lovers of brilliant music, concert and salon fantasies, his piano pieces were structured for the needs of the sale, almost improvised, but correctly written while praising the skill of the happy choice of patterns implemented and their variety. His concert and salon compositions have neither the merit of craftsmanship nor the ingenuity of the masters whom he had taken as influence but are unique on their own.

Goria's first popular hits were his 1st. and 2nd. concert-études, in E♭ major, Opp. 7–8, his charming Bluette, which imitates Thalberg, from whom he obviously proceeds, as well as Prudent, but one thing must be said of those who imperfectly said he sounded pretentious and full of his own merit. This unfortunate appreciation is explained indeed by futile causes. Goria had neither the physiognomy of an Adonis nor the stretched features of the consumptive pianists. He was really at the opposite pole. His large size caused a natural reaction against the awkwardness of his cumbersome corpulence. A real shyness that he sought to disguise under an air of self-assurance whose exaggeration was just one more clumsiness.

== Compositions with opus number ==
Note:The purpose of this list is to collect the prime date of publication of each composition and number them by year. They are categorized here by opus number (or WoO), and title, key, genre, and year in "sortable mode". By clicking the button on its respective cell all content in that column will be displayed in ascending or descending order creating so groups of compositions in relation to their key, musical form or date of publication. The notes section displays very useful and amusing information up to the point of establishing a connection among Goria's compositions, like that between Opp. 7-8-15-16-17-23-39 displayed in bone-colored opus numbers around the stories that permeate them. His transcriptions show alabaster-colored titles while his scores are last displayed where much of the expected reference is impressed on paper.

Title	Opus	Key	Genre	Year	Notes	Scores
Le Papillon	1	C major	Bluette	1852	(Note: Bluette is a musical form, a short brilliant piece of music like Bluette Musicale sur "La Ronde Bachique de Demons" de l'opera La Tentation de Fromental Halevy" pour le piano forte: Op. 114 by Friedrich Wilhelm Michael Kalkbrenner. Music score reviewed and revised by Hugo Hartmann. Aibl, 1852.)	(Note: Le Papillon, Op. 1)
Harmonie du Soir: nocturne sur une mélodie de Jacques Offenbach	2	A minor	Nocturne	1850		(Note: Harmonie du Soir: nocturne sur une mélodie de Jacques Offenbach, Op. 2)
Berceuse: 1re. romance sans paroles	3	C major	Romance	1845	(Note: Published in Berlin by Stempelmann and Heinrih Weiss.)	(Note: Berceuse: 1re. romance sans paroles, Op. 3)
Canzonetta: 2me. romance sans paroles	4	D♭ major	Romance	1845	(Note: Also published as Deux romances sans paroles, Berceuse et Canzonetta.)	(Note: Canzonetta, Op. 4)
Olga: 1re. Polka-Mazurka	5	E♭ major	Mazurka	1843	(Note: Published in Berlin by Stempelmann, Weinholtz u Co., Heinrich Weiss, Julius Weiss, in Erfurt by Bartholomäus, in Hannover by Bachmann, in Leipzig by Klemm and Hofmeister, in Magdeburg by Heinrichshofen.)	(Note: 1re. mazurka brillante pour piano, Op. 5)
Olga: 1re. Polka-Mazurka	5 bis	E♭ major	Mazurka	1843	(Note: Published in Mainz.)	(Note: 1re. mazurka brillante pour piano, Op. 5 bis No. 2 (4 mains))
Heure de la prière: 1re. caprice-nocturne caractéristique	6	A♭ major	Nocturne	1843	(Note: Originally titled Caprice-Nocturne. Published in Berlin by Stempelmann, Weinholtz u Co., Julius Weiss, in Erfurt by Bartholomäus, in Hannover by Bachmann, in Leipzig by Klemm and after 1852 in Turin, Italy, by A. Racca.)	(Note: Heure de la prière, Op. 6)
1re. étude de concert pour le piano	7	E♭ major	Étude	1845	(Note: Published also as Étude de Concert [Op. 7], transcripte pour la Harpe par Charles Oberthür. Op. 101." (1892). In Milan by F. Lucca in 1846 with dedicatee "à son ami Émile Prudent", in Berlin by Philipp, Stempelmann, Henrich Weiss, in Erfurt by Bartholomäus, in Hannover by Bachmann and in Pest by Rózsavölgyi.)	(Note: 1re. étude de concert pour piano seul, Op. 7)
1re étude de concert, en mi♭ arrangée à quatre mains pour le piano	7 bis	E♭ major	Duo	1845	(Note: "À son ami E. Prudent." Mayence, Les fils de B. Schott [1860ca.]. Published in Milan by F. Lucca in 1846.)	(Note: 1re. étude de concert pour piano seul, Op. 7)
2me. étude de concert pour le piano	8	E♭ major	Étude	1844	(Note: The first part of this composition is for the left hand only, although the brilliance of the whole is enhanced by the right one. Published in Berlin by B. u Bock.)	(Note: 2me. étude de concert, Op. 8)
Sérénade pour la main gauche seule et ensuite a deux mains	9	B♭ major	Étude	1846	(Note: A Serénade for Six Hands → "M. Goria is a great and powerful pianist, tall in size, powerful in sound, which, of course, is not very common for this dry instrument, despite the genius of our skilled manufactures of this instrument whose intonation does not live under the pressure of the fingers, bow or human breath, which makes the voice the most beautiful of all instruments. In the concert M. Goria gave on the 29th last month (February 1845), he was past of the charming trio "The Osborne" with MM. Hermann and Seligman. His Serenade for the Left Hand earned him a parfoemance by all the listeners' hands; his study, entitled: L'Eleganza, proves the distinction of his musical thought. After this piece for three pianos, which was very well played by MM. Lacombe, Ravina and the beneficiary, three students of Mr. Zimmermann, author of this trio, M. Goria finished his concert, which attracted a large and distinguished audience, with a nocturne of his own composition that was no less successful than his other works." Revue et Gazette Musicale (1845))	(Note: Sérénade pour la main gauche seule, Op. 9 (Original score))
L'Attente (Die Erwartung): 2me. caprice-nocturne caractéristique	10	C minor	Nocturne	1847	(Note: The Missing Nocturne → L'Attente (Die Erwartung) means "The Expectation". "Pazdírek (1839—1919) (op. cit) mentions one WoO by Czerny called "Attente, nocturne" but there is no trace of that work elsewhere. The French composer Alexandre Edouard Goria, who lived for some time in Vienna and knew Czerny well, published a nocturne in 1847 called "L'attente", his opus 10. It is thus probable that Pazdirek's indication is erroneous." Richard d'Ari. Dedicatée: À son ami Ch. Gounod, Paris)	(Note: L'Attente, Op. 10)
Le Calme: 3me. caprice-nocturne caractéristique	11	A major	Nocturne	1845	(Note: 3me. caprice-nocturne caractéristique together with Op. 10-6. Also published under the title 3 nocturnes caractéristiques. No 1. Caprice-nocturne. Op. 6. No 2. L'Attente. Op. 10. No 3. Le Calme. Op. 11. [P.F.] no. 3.)	(Note: Le Calme, Op. 11)
Alice: Valse brillante pour piano	12	C major	Valse	1847	(Note: Dedicatée à Mlle. Fanny Lecomte)	(Note: Alice: Valse brillante, Op. 12)
Alice: Valse brillante pour piano arrangée à quatre mains	12 bis	C major	Duo	1847	(Note: Dedicatée à Mlle. Fanny Lecomte)	(Note: Alice: Valse brillante, Op. 12)
Andante de salon	13	B major	Andante	1845	(Note: A tempo marking used as a title for this composition.)	
2me. mazurka brillante pour piano	14	A major	Mazurka	1845		(Note: 2me. mazurka brillante pour piano, Op. 14)
L'eleganza: 3me. étude de salon	15	C major	Étude	1845		(Note: L'eleganza: 3me. étude de salon, Op. 15)
Improvisation: 4me. étude de salon	16	G major	Étude	1845		(Note: Improvisation: 4me. étude de salon, Op. 16)
Barcarolle: 5me. étude de salon	17	F major	Étude	1845	(Note: Mayence)	(Note: Barcarolle: 5me. étude de salon, Op. 17)
Nadièjda (L'Espérance): 3me. mazurka brilliant originale pour piano	18	A♭ major	Mazurka	1846	(Note: Published in Berlin by Stempelmann, B. u Bock, Weinholtz u Co., in Erfurt by Bartholomäus and in Prague by Wetzler.)	(Note: Nadièjda: 3me. mazurka brilliant pour piano, Op. 18)
Rêverie	19	B♭ major	Rêverie (Note: Cherkessk March from Ruslan and Lyudmila by Mikhail Glinka)	1846	(Note: Charles Gounod's Family Bonds Ulysse was produced the 18th of June 1852 under Offenbach's directorship. I had just married, a few days before, Pierre-Joseph-Guillaume Zimmermann's daughter, the celebrated professor of piano at the Conservatory and to whom is due his reputation coming from the same "school" from which Prudent, Marmontel, Goria, Lefébure-Wély, Ravina, Bizet, and ao many others come. I became then, by this alliance, brother-in-law of the young painter Édouard Dubufe who was already most ably carrying his father's name the heritage and reputation of which his own son, Guillaume Dubufe, promises to brilliantly maintain." Charles Gounod - "à Mme. Juliette Dubufé". Also published as "Rêverie. Pour le piano. Composée et dédiée à Mrs. R.A. Reinagle (of Oxford) etc. <Op. 19>." London : R. Cocks & Co., [1846])	(Note: Rêverie pour le piano, Op. 19)
Fantaisie brillante sur des motifs de "Les Plaintes de la jeune fille" de Franz Schubert	20	E♭ major	Fantaisie	1846	(Note: A lieder entitled "The Maiden's lament" written by Schubert in the beginning of his career.)	(Note: Fantaisie brillante sur des motifs du Lieder "Les Plaintes de la jeune fille", Op. 20)
Fantaisie de concert sur des motifs de l'Opéra "Les Mousquetaires de la Reine" de Fromental Halévy	21	D major	Fantaisie	1846		(Note: Fantaisie de concert sur des motifs de "Les Mousquetaires de la Reine", Op. 21)
Souvenir du Théâtre Italien; 1re. fantaisie brillante sur des motifs de l'Opéra "Norma" de Vincenzo Bellini; 2me. fantaisie brillante sur des motifs de l'Opéra "La sonnambula" de Bellini	22	E♭ major	Fantaisie	1847		(Note: Souvenir du Théâtre Italien, Op. 22) (Note: Souvenir du Théâtre Italien, Op. 22 bis)
Souvenir du Théâtre Italien; 1re. fantaisie brillante sur des motifs de l'Opéra "Norma" de Vincenzo Bellini; 2me. fantaisie brillante sur des motifs de l'Opéra "La sonnambula" de Bellini	22	B major	Fantaisie	1847		(Note: Souvenir du Théâtre Italien, Op. 22) (Note: Souvenir du Théâtre Italien, Op. 22 bis)
Saltarelle: 6me. étude de salon	23	C major	Étude		(Note: This 6me. étude de salon completes his set of studies École moderne du pianiste, 6 Études brillantes, 2me. suite together with his Op. 63.)	(Note: Saltarelle: 6me. étude de salon, Op. 23)
Fantaisie élégante sur des motifs de l'Opéra "La Sultane" de Maurice Bourges	24		Fantasie		(Note: Jean Maurice Bourges, distinguished musical critic, born at Bordeaux Dec. 2, 1812; came early to Paris, and studied composition under Barbereau. In 1839 he became joint-editor of the 'Revue et Gazette musicale,' the high reputation of which paper is in great measure owing to him. In 1846 'Sultana,' an opera of his, was successfully produced at the Opéra Comique. He made an excellent translation of the words of Mendelssohn's 'Elijah.' He died in 1868, after an illness of many years.)	
Grand étude dramatique pour piano	25		Étude	1847		
3 pensées caractéristiques; Ophelia: Mélodie originale pour piano; Miranda: Polka originale pour piano; Odessa: 4me. Mazurka originale pour piano	26	E♭ major C major A♭ major	Morceau	1847	(Note: This score reads: Odessa Op. 26. 3/8 Introduction; 3/4 Andantino con morbidezza. Another score (only one) reads: 2 Pensées caractéristiques pour Piano, No. 1. Ophelia, mélodie. No. 2. Miranda, polka. Op. 26. London : R. Cocks & Co, [1847]. No. 1 Ophelia reads: "1ere. Pensée Caracteristique". Dedicated to Madame. H. Offenbach. Mayence [etc.] : les fils de B. Schott, [ca 1847])	(Note: 3 Pensées caractéristiques pour le piano, Op. 26. No. 1 Ophelia) (Note: 3 pensées caractéristiques, Op. 26 No. 2 Miranda) (Note: Odessa: 4me. Mazurka originale pour piano, Op. 26 No. 3 Odessa)
Fantaisie de concert sur des motifs de l'Opéra "Belisario" de Gaetano Donizetti	27	A♭ major	Fantaisie	1847	(Note: In three sections: section 1 unlabeled; section 2 Terzetto; and section 3 Intermezzo. Dedicatee: M. Alfred Jaell, de Vienne.)	(Note: Fantaisie de concert sur des motifs de l'Opéra "Belisario", Op. 27)
Grand duo de concert sur "Belisario" de Donizetti	27 bis	A♭ major	Duo			(Note: Grand duo de concert sur "Belisario" de Donizetti pour deux pianos, Op. 27 bis)
	28					
Grand duo de concert pour violon et piano sur des motifs de l'Opéra "Don Pasquale" de Donizetti	29		Duo	1847	(Note: Goria and Hermann's vaudeville duo de concert → "Without doubt collaboration gives rise to vaudeville and like this the duet is born; and because of this kind of work in pairs, it is logical to think that one may be in the art of writing music when the violinist exchange places with the pianist who plays the violin very badly, and the violinist in turn plays the piano the same manner. This is what makes our virtuosos feel the need to associate themselves; hence the charming duets for piano and violin, by Bérliot and Wolff, Guichard and Brisson, Lacombe and Hermann. The latter has just composed or arranged one in association with M. Goria, on the motives of Don Pasquale. This dialogue for piano and violin, full of that Italian melody so loved by amateurs, is in execution, if not easy, at least possible. The two instruments equally struggle with graceful melody and brilliant strokes. The violinist has everything to play the works of Donizatti, and one could not better suit the expressive qualities of the king of instruments, when the pianist brings out all the advantages the piano has to offer." J. Bibent)	
Mélancolie: 4me. nocturne caractéristique	30	G major	Nocturne	1845	(Note: "à Melle Esther Remy Paris, Chabal Editeur Ch. 639 XIXe siècle ca1845")	(Note: Mélancolie, Op. 30)
Fantaisie brillante sur des motifs de l'Opéra "Ne touchez pas à la reine" de Xavier Boisselot	31		Fantasie			
Fantaisie de salon sur des motifs de l'Opéra "Le Bouquet de l'Infante" de François-Adrien Boieldieu	32		Fantasie		(Note: Mainz, Schott.)	
Chanson espagnole: Solo de concert pour le piano	33		Morceau	1840	(Note: Original title Chanson espagnole, Op. 33. Published in Milan by F. Lucca between 1847 and 1848.)	
Nocturne de Soirée sur la romance Una furtiva lagrima de l'Opéra "L'élisir d'Amore" de Gaetano Donizetti	34	B♭ major	Nocturne	1847	(Note: Mayence : Les fils de B. Schott)	(Note: Nocturne de soirée sur una Furtiva Lagrima de Donizetti Op. 34)
Souvenir de Dieppe: Grand valse caractéristique pour piano	35	F major	Valse	1848		(Note: Souvenir de Dieppe, Op. 35)
Souvenirs d'Otello: Fantaisie de salon sur des motifs de l'Opéra "Otello" de Gioacchino Rossini	36	D major	Fantaisie	1847	(Note: Dedicatee à Mademoiselle A. Groslevin.)	(Note: Souvenirs d'Otello, Op. 36)
Ballade: rêverie pour piano	37	F♯ major	Rêverie	1847		(Note: Ballade: rêverie pour piano, Op. 37)
Choeur des Bardes: mélodie célèbre sur des motifs de l'Opéra "La donna del lago" de Gioacchino Rossini	38	E♭ major	Mélodie	1847	(Note: Subtitled: Hymne à Pie 9me. Ded: à M-lle Joséphine Martin. Mayence [etc.] : les fils de B. Schott, [non ante 1847])	(Note: Choeur des Bardes: mélodie célèbre sur des motifs de l'Opéra "La donna del lago," Op. 37)
Grande étude d'expression, 7me. étude de salon	39		Étude	1848		
Caprice de concert sur le trio [Qual volutta trascorrere] (Note: "What wondrous pleasure I feel" - Scene 3: A grotto near the River Jordan) de l'Opéra "I Lombardi" de Giuseppe Verdi	40	A♭ major	Caprice	1847	(Note: Grande fantasie triumphale, Op. 84, based on themes from Verdi's opera Il Lombardi. Gottschalk had almost surely been present at the premiere of this opera in Paris in 1847 and probably knew the variantions on the famous trio published by his friend pianist Alexandre Goria." Starr, S. F. (2000). Also published as Capriccio brillante per pianoforte solo sull'Opera "I Lombardi" del M. Verdi.)	(Note: Caprice de concert, Op. 40)
Grande mazurka originale	41		Mazurka	1848		
Fantaisie brillante sur des motifs de l'Opéra "Semiramide" de Gioachino Rossini	42	D major	Fantasie			(Note: Fantaisie brillante sur des motifs de "Semiramide", Op. 42)
L'Agilité: Grande étude de concert	43	C major	Étude	1848	(Note: In 1847, the opera was significantly revised to become Verdi's first grand opera for performances in France at the Salle Le Peletier of the Paris Opera under the title of Jérusalem. Dedicatée "à Mademoiselle Neney Pellier".)	(Note: L'Agilité: Grande étude de concert, Op. 43)
Salut à la Grande Brétagne: Six airs anglese transcrite et variée, 1re. Suite; God Save the Queen..........God Save the Queen; Never till Now: Nocturne.........Rêverie sur un motif anglais; College Hornpipe.......... Air de danse: pas des matelos anglais; Ar Hyd y Nos: Rêverie.......... Mary Anne: troisième rêverie; See, the Conqu'ring Hero Comes! (Note: Choeur de Judas Macchabée, de Haendel, varié pour piano, WoO).......... Judas Maccabaeus (Handel); Rule, Britannia!.......... Rule, Britannia!; Six airs écossaises transcrite et variée, 2me. Suite; Air national écossaise: Marche militaire; Marche écossaise: (Note: "The Scots March, composed for the ancient guard of James V of Scotland, when marching to attack the castle of Tantallon in 1527". Memoirs and Adventures of Sir John Hepburn (1851) James Grant); Le Rose Rouge: Scotch melody with variations; Le jeune Chevalier: Romance (Note: Par un beau matin, un lundi Au début de l'année Notre ville accueillit Charlie Le Jeune Chevalier. Robert Burns); Fantaisie Elégante; Rondo écossaise	44	A♭ major 2; 3; 4; 5; 6 1; 2; 3; 4; 5; 6	Air	1846	(Note: This composition was arranged by Goria as a fantasia. 1re. Série, Nos. 1-6 – 2me. Série Nos. 7-12. A 3me. Série Nos. 13-18 [!] is listed somewhere on Google Books. Published in Milan by F. Lucca with dedicatée "A M.r Georges Pfeiffer".)	(Note: Six airs anglese transcrite et variée, Op. 44 No. 1 God Save the Queen); 2; 3; 4; 5; 6 1; 2; 3; 4; 5; 6
Six mélodies Écossaises; Jenny; Fenella; Edith; Rose; Flora; Diana	45	1; 2; 3; 4 G major 6	Mélodie	1840		(Note: Six mélodies Écossaises, Op. 45 No. 5 Flora)
Adelaide: mélodie pour Ludwig van Beethoven transcrite et variée	46		Mélodie		(Note: Neue Berliner Musik Zeigtung on Goria's Le val d'Andorre, Op. 47 → "Goria worked with effort and diligence and, if not original, delivered something skilfully put together as for his Op. 47, accepting like this, to some extent, the sin he committed by transcribing Beethoven's Adelaide (namely in the Final Allegro which incidentally he liked). That the French sometimes have a desire to touch the core of German issues is something known to everyone, so let them enjoy themselves with pretty polkas or a "Valse infernale", quadrille, or the like by Philippe Musard. These German works stand as colosses for centuries and require modern (polka) chisels to scrape them off the dirt of the insipid "musique du jour." Presented by M. George Hainl together with Goria on 15 March 1857, in Lyon.)	
Fantaisie dramatique sur Le val d'Andorre de Fromental Halévy	47		Fantaisie	1849	(Note: Concert de M. Goria, Prt 4 → "We cannot end our review without paying a tribute of praise to Mme. Geismar and M. Marthieu lent M. Goria the assistance of their talent. Mlle. Geismar sang with delightful melancholy a delicious melody by M.L. Peuchot, Le Soir. She sang in the second part of the concert the romance of the Carillonneur de Bruges, a three-act Opéra-Comique with music by Albert Grisar, which premiered at the Théâtre de l'Opéra-Comique with libretto by Jules-Henri Vernoy de Saint-Georges) (20 February 1852). We would have enjoyed this romance with great satisfaction being it a little more accurate in the voice. As for M. Marthieu, whose organ is magnificent, he sang in an irreproachable manner the romance of Val d'Andorre (le Suspicion, Thérèse), and the magnificent Stances à l'éternité by M. Delsarte. He should have only broken with a more varied and warmer diction the otherwise inevitable monotony of this large and dark song. Two days later, there was indeed a second concert given by Mlle. Pinel, the profit of which must be used for the completion of the Church of Saint-Aubin. We couldn't attend; we could then only talk about it by hearsay, we prefer to be silent." J. Bibent)	
La Chasse: caprice de concert pour le piano	48		Caprice	1840	(Note: Original title La Chasse, Op. 48. Published in Milan by F. Lucca.)	
Les Bords de la Newa: Trois mazurkas originales pour piano; Le Drowski (Note: A sort of low, open carriage, with four wheels, much used in Saint Petersburg.); Le Palais D'Hiver (Note: Le Palais D'Hiver in Saint Petersburg was burnt down on December 29, 1837.); La Czarine	49	C major D♭ major G major	Mazurka	1849	(Note: This score by Lucca reads: "Title: Les bords de la Newa 6.me : 3 mazurkas originales pour piano, Op. 49. Nr 2, Le palais d'hiver Alternative title: Mazurek Op 49 Nr 2 Le Palais d'Hiver Publisher: Lucca, Francesco (1802-1872))	(Note: Les Bords de la Newa, Op. 49 No. 1 Le Drowski) (Note: Les Bords de la Newa: Trois mazurkas originales pour piano Op. 49 No. 2 Le Palais D'Hiver); 3
La Brise, fantaisie brillante sur des motifs de l'opéra "Haydée" de Daniel Auber	50		Fantasie			
Grande fantaisie de concert sur des motifs Cavatina: Ah conforto è sol la speme de l'Opéra "Il Corsaro" de Giuseppe Verdi	51		Fantasie			
Fantaisie brillante sur motifs de l'Opéra "Les Monténégrins" de Armand Limnander	52		Fantasie	1849		
L'addio: 5me. nocturne de concert pour piano	53	C minor	Nocturne	1847	(Note: Published in Milan by F. Lucca with dedicatee "A son ami Antoine François Marmontel".)	(Note: L'addio: 5me. nocturne de concert pour piano, Op. 53)
La Vénitienne: 2me. barcarolle	54		Barcarolle			
Caprice brillante sur des motifs de l'Opéra "La Fée aux Roses" de Fromental Halévy	55		Caprice	1850		
Sérénade du roi Richard sur des motifs de l'Opéra "Le songe d'une nuit d'été" d'Ambroise Thomas	56		Morceau	1850	(Note: Listed as morceau de salon. “L'Italia musicale” No. 87 (1850).)	
Fantaisie brillante sur des motifs de l'Opéra "La dame blanche" de François-Adrien Boieldieu	57	D major	Fantaisie	1850	(Note: Dedicatée "son ami Henri Heugel".)	(Note: Fantaisie brillante sur des motifs de "La dame blanche", Op. 57)
Les adieux de Marie Stuart: Caprice-étude de concert pour piano seul sur la romance de Louis Niedermeyer	58	D♭ major	Étude	1850	(Note: The title refers to Marie's aria in act 1 where she bids her farewell to France ("Déjà la nuit s'avance") is also known as "Les adieux de Marie Stuart". Not to be confused with Richard Wagner's WWV61 lieder Adieu de Marie Stuart)	
La Campanella: Mélodie étude pour piano	59		Étude	1850		
Fantaisie brillante sur la romance de l'Opéra "La Chanteuse voilée" de Victor Massé	60		Fantasie	1850	(Note: Fantaisie "baillante" → "For some time now, we have seen the portrait of a pianist displayed on all the walls, surrounded by the titles of all the pieces he has composed. This pianist is called M. Goria and the advertisements tell us that he has acquired immense success. What a joke! M. Goria is a successful pianist but he is compromised by ridiculous praise in the newspapers. Recently, one said: "The works of M. Goria are "baillantes" (instead of "brillantes")." This is textual. It must be believed that the "éditeur" had to take some revenge on the composer. He had probably heard his songs". Escudier)	
Deux caprice de salon sur des motifs de l'Opéra Raymond, ou Le secret de la reine d'Ambroise Thomas; Caprice dramatique; Le Carillon	61		Caprice	1851	(Note: Published in Milan by F. Lucca.)	
La Pavane: air de danse du XVIme siècle (1579)	62	B♭ major	Air	1851	(Note: Dedicatée à son ami Marmontel.)	. (Note: La Pavane: Air de Danse du XVIe Siècle (1579), transcrit et varié pour piano seul, Op 62)
Six grandes études artistiques de style et de mécanisme pour piano: École moderne de pianiste, 1re. suite; Jour de Printems, Étude Cantabile; Le Tournoi, Étude Bravoure; Gondoline, Étude Barcarolle; La Jeune-Garde, Étude Marziale; La Rêveuse, Étude Nocturne; La Fuite, Étude Vélocité	63	A♭ major F major 3 A major A major D major	Étude	1842-43	(Note: École moderne de pianiste → "A very special mention in this nomenclature of Goria's piano pieces is a series of "studies of style and mechanism" published under the title Le pianiste moderne, Op. 72, and his Six great artistic studies, Op. 63, both adopted by the Conservatory studies committee. If only he had taken the time to write similar works, his name would have become even more popular in education like those of the masters of the modern school.")	(Note: Six grandes études artistiques, Op. 63 No. 1 Jour de Printems); 2; 3; 4 (Note: Six grandes études artistiques Op. 63 Nr 5 Étude-Nocturne La Rêveuse!); 6
Fantaisie de concert sur un finale de l'Opéra "Lucrezia Borgia" de Gaetano Donizetti	64		Fantaisie		(Note: Matinée de M. Goria → "M. Goria is a pianist like many, but that doesn't mean he doesn't have talent. His manner is clear, his touch is light, brilliant, but he doesn't seem to care much about what comes from inside. The harder it is, the more you have to think about it. He traces a melodic line in an irreproachable way, but what line, what mechanism are we talking about so much now, if there's no heart. Without seeking for the equality of the notes, every intonation has the same volume of sound, and the result is a monotonous noise for the ear which often makes it rightly said that the piano is definitely not a concert instrument. M. Goria performed the Fantaisie sur les motifs de l'opéra "Lucia di Lammermoor" de G. Donizetti (requested) as it was listed on the program. Without going back too far to the source of this request, we have observed that this fantasy by Prudent is one of those pieces which, when the melody has already crossed to the line of "pont-neuf", somebody has to finish it. That makes the ladies swing their heads from right to left and from left to right on each beat of the 6/8 tempo, making a musician of a rather original mind to call rhythmic pieces like this, "cloacked rondos". M. Goria should have chosen in preference to this fantasy, a piece as good as that of Hallé and do what he does in his private matinées and in his annual concert. Be that as it may, M. Goria is an artist of the future and one of clear and brilliant manner in which he plays Hummel with his skilful interlocutors." Room, which we lack, does not allow us to say much about this concert in which Mlle. Lia Duport intervened with La biondina in gondoletta. Barcarolla veneziana with variations by Ferdinando Paer, and romances from this composition. She obtained enthusiastic success, the honors of this concert were for her." Henri Blanchard Gazette musicale de Paris (26 Mars 1848))	
Prima-sera: Rêverie Italiana pour le piano	65	F major	Rêverie		(Note: Dedicatée "à mon ami Louis James Alfred Lefébure-Wély". Paris, Heugel)	(Note: Trois Morceau caractéristiques, Op. 65 No. 1 Prima-sera)
Allegrezza: Étude de concert	66		Étude			
Chanson Mauresque	67		Morceau	1853	(Note: Also published as 3 Morceaux caractéristiques pour piano, (No. 1 Prima sera No. 2 Allegrezza No. 3 Chanson Mauresque) Op. 65, 66, 67 (1854))	
Fantaisie dramatique sur des motifs de l'Opéra "Marco Spada" de Daniel Auber	68		Fantasie	1854		
Tarantelle de concert: Sorrente napolitaine	69	A♭ major	Tarantelle	1853	(Note: Dedicatée "À Melle. Marie Mira")	(Note: Tarantelle de concert: Sorrente napolitaine, Op. 69)
Sérénade du Barbier de Séville de Rossini transcrite et variée pour piano seul	70	C major	Morceau	1853-54	(Note: Dedicated to Mademoiselle Josephine d'Arquinvilliers.)	(Note: Sérénade du "Barbier de Séville", Op. 70)
Grande caprice de concert sur des motifs de l'Opéra "Etoile du Nord" de Giacomo Meyerbeer	71		Caprice			
Le Pianiste moderne: Études de style et de mécanisme: Série 1 Nos. 1-6; Rêverie; Danse villageoise; Mélodie expressive; Idylle; Cantilène (Note: Cantilena, a sweet melancholic melody.); Marche Tcherkess; Série 2 Nos. 7-12; Elégie, Étude-caprice; Étude d'Agilité; Romanza; Toccata; Le Trille, Étude-caprice; Les Àrpeges, Étude-caprice	72	E major B major A♭ major B♭ major G♭ major D major 7 A major 9 A minor D♭ major 12	Étude	1853-54	(Note: Concert de M. Goria, Part 2 → "Danse villageoise is charmingly lively and original, and at the same time it is a brilliant fantasy, it is an excellent study of octaves, it connects the useful to the pleasant, we recommend it to piano students. The other compositions that we have been given to hear are for the most part only arrangements on operatic motifs. It is so with the Fantaisie sur Trouvère and the romance of William Tell (sombres forêts). We will say nothing of these compositions which required more skill than genius from the author. However, we must point out the Caprice de concert on motifs from Oberon with quartet accompaniment. This truly classical quartet for soprano, mezzo-soprano, tenor and bass, is sung by Rezia, Fatime, Scherasmin and his master the knight Huon. Huon and Scherasmin propose to the two girls of the East to flee with them through the blue waves: Uber die blauens Wogen as the German text says. Rezia and Fatime accept the proposal by repeating the same phrase that Huon and Scherasmin just sang, and then the four voices come together and form an ensemble full of elegance and clarity. M. Goria, took as subject of his whim the delicious duet of the third act between Scherasmin and Fatime, and the famous finale of the Grand air de Rezia which characterizes to such a high point the greatness of the Weber's genius." → Concert de M. Goria - Part 3)	1; 2; 3; 4 (Note: Le Pianiste moderne: Études de style et de mécanisme, Op. 72 No. 2)| 6 7; 8; 9 (Note: Le Pianiste moderne: Études de style et de mécanisme, Op. 72 No. 10); 11; 12
Souvenir du pré aux clercs: fantaisie-caprice sur des motifs de l'Opéra "Le pré aux clercs" de Ferdinand Hérold	73	E♭ major	Fantaisie	1853-54		
Nocturne de concert	74	G♭ major	Nocturne	1853	(Note: Also listed on Bibliographie de la France 1847 p. 240 Nocturne de concert en sol b pour piano, op. 74. Dedicatée "à Mademoiselle Laure Busso-Delavault son Elève.")	
Fête moldave: mazurka brilliante	75	A♭ major	Mazurka	1860	(Note: Schott Music. Mayence : Les fils de B. Schott, [ca 1860])	(Note: Fête moldave: mazurka brilliante, Op. 75)
La Tirana: air national de Cadix, fantaisie andalouse pour piano	76		Fantaisie	1855	(Note: The Marillleño Incident → "The resounding successes of Émile Prudent and Louis Moreau Gottschalk on the other side of the Pyrenées had inspired Goria with the desire to see that beautiful country where talented artists have always received the warmest of welcomes. Provided with numerous letters of recommendation assured fruitful concerts to him who went straight to Madrid where the high society was always there to give him an enthusiastic reception. Celebrated in the salons it did not take him long to announce a great concerts whose tickets were sold in just a few hours. In the evening there was usually a full house and a rowry audience prepared to applaude him when a terrible incident upset the benevolent dispositions of the public. During this trip and since his arrival in Madrid, Goria had taken notes, not musical notes, but motifs from popular songs, a more or less humorous list, more or less discreet observations embracing the customs of a country related to beauty and women who would not be stopped before details of private lives, all summarized in a letter addressed to the pianist officer Viennot, Goria's intimate friend. This spiritual but untimely letter at the time when the artist appealed to the sympathies of the Spanish people was unfortunately communicated to the director of a still small newspaper, already famous and which was soon to become the leading organ of the light press. It was all printed without calculating the disastrous effect which the publication of this "factum of a schoolboy on vacation" was to produce. The newspaper that arrived in Madrid was read a few minutes before the concert when the audience was already in the hall. It passed hand in hand, from box to box, a storm then was about to be come. In time Goria had to leave Madrid with a broken heart. It was a double material disaster from which he was never to recover. The stagefright from which he suffered from then on became more intense. His dark spirit threatened and provoked him several times as he always seemed to have a duel in prospect, not being in any way a fighter by temperament, of course. He lived so for a few years worried, preoccupied, and saddened." Revue et Gazette musicale. Published in Milan by F. Lucca between 1850 and 1860 with dedicatee "A Mad.lle Mariquita De Biarrote son élève". Mayence : Chez les fils de B. Schott, London [1855]. "Goria is due to give a concert soon. The famous pianist will play Beethoven's concerto in C minor with orchestral accompaniment and new compositions including La Tirana: national air from Cadiz, which produces a great effect. Mlle. Marie Cinti-Damoreau and M. Herman will lend him their assistance.")	
Fantaisie brillante pour piano sur des motifs de l'Opéra "Jenny Bell" de Daniel Auber	77		Fantasie			
Au Bord de la Fontaine: Étude-rêverie pour piano	78	D♭ major	Étude	1856	(Note: Original title Les regrets: Impromptu étude pour le piano. Published in Milan by F. Lucca c. 1861 with dedicatee "A madame Ed. Lyon née Coche".)	(Note: Au Bord de la Fontaine, Op. 78)
Souvenirs d'Il Trovatore: fantaisie de concert sur l'Opéra "Il trovatore" de Giuseppe Verdi	79	C major	Fantaisie	1856		(Note: Souvenirs d'Il Trovatore, Op. 79)
Grande valse de concert pour piano seul	80	E♭ major	Valse	1850	(Note: A Mme. La Baronne Dumesnil, Superintendent of the Imperial House of the Legion of Honor, published in Milan by F. Lucca c. 1850.)	(Note: ''Grande valse de concert pour piano seul, Op. 80)
Chanson allemande: originale caprice caractéristique	81	A♭ major	Caprice	1857		(Note: Chanson allemande: originale caprice caractéristique, Op. 81)
Marguérite au Rouet: fantaisie brillante sur des motifs de "Gretchen am Spinnrade" Op. 2 de Franz Schubert	82	F major	Fantaisie	1857	(Note: Alternative title: ''Marguérite au Rouet: Deuxieme melodie de Franz Schubert. Menestrel et Heuguel et Cie. (Paris), Schott (London), Luccas (Milan). Dedicatée Melle. Lydia Inglis.)	(Note: Marguérite au Rouet: fantaisie brillante sur des motifs de "Gretchen am Spinnrade", Op. 82)
Fantaisie brillante sur des motifs de l'Opéra "La Reine Topaze" de Victor Massé	83		Fantaisie	1857		
Pervenche: rêverie pour piano	84	D♭ major	Rêverie	1859		(Note: Pervenche: rêverie pour piano Op. 84)
Grand caprice de concert sur des motifs de l'Opéra "Obéron" de Carl Maria von Weber	85		Caprice		(Note: Also titled Grand caprice de concert pour le piano avec orchester (ad libitum) sur Obéron de Weber)	
Marche des Gardes françaises sur une mélodie rococo d'Antoine Vialon	86	B♭ major	March	1847	(Note: Ded.: A son élève M-lle Emma Bossu. Mayence : les fils de B. Schott, [non ante 1858].)	(Note: Marche des Gardes françaises sur une mélodie rococo d'Antoine Vialon, Op. 86)
Fantaisie brillante sur des motifs Sombres forêts de l'Opéra "Guillaume Tell" de Gioacchino Rossini	87	A♭ major	Fantaisie	1857		(Note: Fantaisie brillante sur des motifs de Guillaume Tell", Op. 87)
La Sérénade: caprice de genre	88		Caprice			
Mazurka styrienne	89		Mazurka			
Chants du Nord: Trois airs russes; Chanson Bohémienne; Barcarolle: Air de Mikhail Glinka; Mazurka de Gourileff	90	1 B minor 3	Air			
Réminiscences de Martha: fantaisie-caprice sur des motifs de l'Opéra "Martha" de Friedrich von Flotow	90 bis	F major	Fantaisie	1860	(Note: Ded: à Miss Patricia B. Kennett, son élève. Mayence : les fils de B. Schott, [ca 1860])	(Note: Réminiscences de Martha: fantaisie-caprice sur de "Martha" de Friedrich von Flotow, Op. 90 bis)
Marche triomphale pour deux pianos concertans	91	E♭ major	Duo	1858	(Note: Concert de M. Goria, Part 1 → "The days follow each other, but are not alike. In one of our last reviews, we noted with regret the culpable indifference with which the public had received the famous violinist M. Sainton; today, we note with happiness that a numerous and chosen audience met, on February 17 (1859), in the salons of the Society of Saint-François-Xavier at the concert of M. Goria. This eagerness to respond to the call of the eminent pianist, in no way surprised us, it was legitimate. M. Goria is certainly a virtuoso well worth hearing. It shines with the most outstanding qualities. Correction; perfect, flawless finish, great equality of execution such are the salient characteristics of his talent. To this already rather rare merit, he adds an intimate knowledge of the mechanism which allows him to play with the greatest difficulties. The stroke is on his fingers always pure and fast; the octaves, either in the bass or with the right hand, soar forth with incomparable clarity, lightness and vigour. The sounds skillfully blend together in perfect harmony. The phrase has roundness and distinction; only sometimes it is a little monotonous, the artist liking to reproduce the same rhythms too often. And now, if leaving M. Goria as a performer, we wonder what if he is as a composer, we find in his compositions pleasant fantasies that we always listen to with pleasure. This artist seems to have understood the true character of the instrument of which he is so skilful interpreter. He knows that a piano piece played too hard must inevitably tire and displease. It is because, in fact, from the point of view of the concerto, the instrument used has very limited resources. A cold and inert keyboard mercilessly arrests the passionate feelings which could agitate the soul of the artist, and does not leave him the means of conveying them to that of the listeners. The sounds, escaping the power of the performer as soon as they are produced, prevent him from translating into a broad and full phrase the grandeur and nobility of his thought. M. Goria therefore gives his compositions little scope; an idea originally expressed is enough for him to compose a piece. And in this, he shows taste and intelligence. Among his works, those tmost admired are: Marche triomphale for two pianos, also entitled Marche triomphale pour piano à quatre mains. (Milan - F. Lucca), and his Danse villageoise. The first is of a broad and majestic style, the ideas linked together with art and the developments not lacking in elegance." → Concert de M. Goria - Part 2)	(Note: Marche triomphale pour deux pianos concertans, Op. 91)
Amitié, 2.me caprice-nocturne pour le piano	92		Nocturne	1858	(Note: The french word "Amitié" means "Friendship". Chabal [Paris] and J. Meissonnier fils (Paris))	
Le Muletiers: Bolero-scherzo de concert	93		Scherzo	1858	(Note: Also published as Les Muletiers, boléro-scherzo de concert pour piano, Op. 92 by J. Meissonnier fils, Paris, 1858.)	
Fantaisie brillante sur des motifs de l'Opéra "Rigoletto" de Giuseppe Verdi	94	A♭ major	Fantaisie	1859	(Note: Dedicatee à son élève Miss Lydia Inglis)	(Note: Fantaisie brillante sur des motifs de "Rigoletto", Op. 94)
Fantaisie dramatique sur des motifs de l'Opéra "Le Pardon de Ploërmel" de Giacomo Meyerbeer	94 bis	B♭ minor	Fantaisie	1859		(Note: Fantaisie dramatique sur des motifs de "Le Pardon de Ploërmel", Op. 94 bis)
Souvenir d'Allemagne: Deux études caractéristiques; Les Regrets: impromptu étude pour le piano; Chant d'Adieu	95	1 F minor	Étude	1859		(Note: Chant d'Adieu)
Au revoir (auf Wiedersehen): villanella pour piano	95 bis		Villanella	1859		
Caprice artistique sur des motifs de l'Opéra Herculanum de Félicien David	96		Caprice	1860		
Fantaisie caprice de concert sur des motifs de l'Opéra "Tannhäuser" de Richard Wagner	97	E♭ major	Caprice	1860		(Note: Fantaisie caprice de concert sur des motifs de l'Opéra "Tannhäuser", Op. 97)
Fantaisie brillante sur des motifs de l'Opéra "La Traviata" de Giuseppe Verdi	98 Posth.	E♭ major	Fantaisie	1861	(Note: Trois oeuvres posthumes)	(Note: Fantaisie brillante sur des motifs de "La Traviata," Op. 98)
Fantaisie de concert sur des motifs de l'opéra "Don Juan" de Wolfgang Amadeus Mozart	99 Posth.		Fantaisie	1861		
Fantaisie sur des motifs de l'Opéra "Philémon et Baucis" de Charles Gounod	Op. 100		Fantaisie	1860		

== Compositions without opus number ==
Title	WoO	Key	Genre	Year	Notes	Scores
Souvenirs du Théâtre lyrique: fantaisie de salon sur des motifs de l'Opéra "Les Dragons de Villars" de Aimé Maillart	WoO		Fantaisie	1859		
Romance des fleurs: fantaisie brillante sur des motifs de l'Opéra "Faust" de Charles Gounod	WoO	C major	Fantaisie			(Note: Fantaisie brillante sur des motifs de "Faust")
Grand valse des fleurs: fantaisie brillante du ballet "Griseldis, ou Les cinq sens" de Adolphe Adam	WoO		Fantaisie	1848		
Le Rossignol et les Roses. Poésie musicale d'Alfred Quidant	WoO		Fantaisie	1848		
Symphonie en ré	WoO	D major	Fantaisie	1856	(Note: Transcrite pour piano seul par A. Goria, n° 2 et 3. Paris, Colombier.)	
Barcarolle No. 1 pour piano	WoO	A♭ major	Barcarolle	1854		(Note: Barcarolle No. 1 pour piano, WoO)
Barcarolle No. 2 pour piano	WoO	G minor	Barcarolle	1854		(Note: Barcarolle No. 2 pour piano, WoO)
Rêverie et Saltarelle	WoO		Rêverie			
Bagatelle sur une danse favorite de Bohême pour piano	WoO		Bagatelle	1844		
Berceuse: fantaisie pour piano	WoO		Fantaisie			
Alboni: mazurka pour piano	WoO		Mazurka	1848	(Note: Goria also went to London in 1848 where, despite the number of pianists, he was sure to mark his place. He had a commitment for six concerts in advance on that year's tour.)	
Rêverie No. 2 pour piano	WoO	B♭	Rêverie	1860		
Musíque des marches et fanfares de la Garde	WoO		March	1847	(Note: Book description archive BNF: "Histoire anecdotique, politique et militaire de la Garde Impériale ... Illustrée par H. Bellangé, E. Lamy, De Moraine, Ch. Vernier. Musique des marches et fanfares de la Garde, transcrite par A. Goria')	
Dernier chant en Provence	WoO		Piano Solo			
Mazurka slave	WoO		Mazurka	1859		
Pastorale pour orgue melodium	WoO		Pastorale	1857		
Mère du chasseur	WoO		Fantasie			
Nocturne pour piano	Op. Posth.		Nocturne	1892		
3 Oeuvres Posthumes pour le piano; 2me. Barcarolle; Promenade en mer; Valse allemande facile	Op. Posth.	A♭ major G major 3	Piano Solo	1861	(Note: Barcarolle in A♭ major. Ricordi, Tito is the preferred form of: Ricordi Regio Stabilimento Musicale or Regio Stabilimento Tito di Gio. Ricordi)	1 (Note: 3 Oeuvres Posthumes pour le piano, Op. 1 No. 1 Promenade en mer); 3
Andante, marcia et finale du Concert-Stuck, pour piano à quatre mains (2 pianos)	WoO	F minor	Duo	1855	(Note: Concert de M. Goria, Part 3 → "A young pianist, laureate of the Toulouse Conservatory, pupil of M. Goria, Mlle. Lucie Deldébat, performed with her master his Marche triumphale arranged for two pianos, and the magnificent piece Concert Stück by Weber, also transcribed by M. Goria for two pianos. The talent of this young artist shines with the same qualities that distinguish that of her master. We admired a great deal her finish in the execution, a great correctness in the details, a vigorous and flexible fingering. She warmly mentioned the allegro passionate of the Concert Stück, and she showed a certain elegance of execution in the march which precedes this allegro. We deeply regret that Mlle. Deldébat did not make herself heard alone, we could have passed a more complete judgment on her; she recoiled, no doubt out of modesty and timidity, before this decisive test which would have revealed to us the truly original and creative side of her talent. No doubt, it is fine not to bend, to hold one's rank with dignity alongside M. Goria; but it is even more beautiful to fly boldly with one's own wings, without the help of the inspiration of the master, and to ask only one's own heart for the impulses which must sparkle you." → Concert de M. Goria - Part 4)	
"Ballo in Masche", divertissement pour piano à quatre mains (1 piano)	WoO	B♭ major	Duo	1862	(Note: Italian Publishing Co. Ricordi issued a music score for this transcription for four hands in March 1862 under the title Divertimento per Pfte a 4 mani sopra motivi del Ballo in Maschera di Verdi (catalogue number 33928).)	
Chanson de jeune fille Polonaise, pour piano, violon et viole	WoO		Trio			
La réforme joyeuse; 1re. Rêverie; 2me. Rêverie; 3me. Rêverie	WoO	1; 2; 3	Rêverie			
Les Adieux, dernière pensée (morceau de salon)	WoO		Morceau		(Note: Published by Heugel)	
Vieux Minuet	WoO	B♭ major	Minuet	1850	(Note: Old minuet. Published by Brainard 7 Co. (Cleveland))	(Note: Vieux Minuet)
