= Op. 22 =

In music, Op. 22 stands for Opus number 22. Compositions that are assigned this number include:

- Arnold – Symphony No. 1
- Barber – Cello Concerto
- Beethoven – Piano Sonata No. 11
- Bizet – Jeux d'enfants
- Chopin – Andante spianato et grande polonaise brillante
- Clara Schumann – Three Romances for Violin and Piano
- Dvořák – Serenade for Strings
- Enescu – String Quartet No. 1
- Enescu – String Quartet No. 2
- Goria – Fantaisie brillante sur des motifs de V. Bellini
- Hindemith – String Quartet No. 4
- Mendelssohn – Capriccio Brillant
- Prokofiev – Visions fugitives
- Rachmaninoff – Variations on a Theme of Chopin
- Rode – 24 Caprices for Violin
- Saint-Saëns – Piano Concerto No. 2
- Sarasate – Spanish Dances, Book II
- Schoenberg – Four Orchestral Songs
- Schumann – Piano Sonata No. 2
- Shostakovich – The Golden Age
- Sibelius – Lemminkäinen Suite, cycle of four tone poems for orchestra (1895, revised 1897, 1900, 1939)
  - This multi-movement work includes The Swan of Tuonela (Tuonelan joutsen), Op. 22/2
- Tchaikovsky – String Quartet No. 2
- Turina – Danzas fantásticas
- Wieniawski – Violin Concerto No. 2
