= Le Bananier (Gottschalk) =

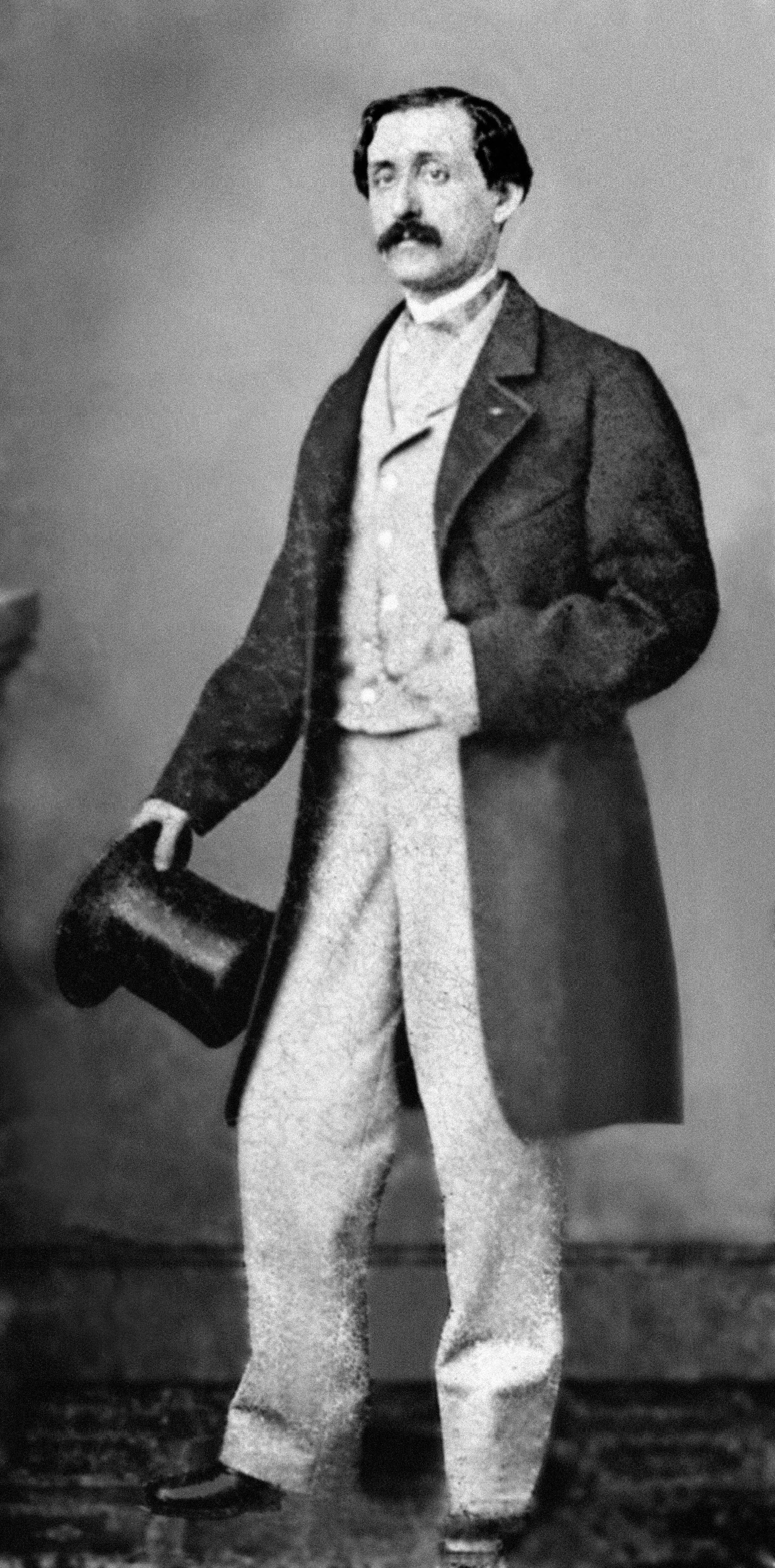
Photo of Louis Moreau Gottschalk

Le Bananier (The Banana Tree) in C minor, Op. 5, is a composition for piano by American composer Louis Moreau Gottschalk. Dedicated to the famous pianist Alexandre Goria, it was written in France around 1846 as one of the four "Louisiana Creole pieces" that Gottschalk composed between 1844 and 1846. Based on the Creole folk melody En avan' Grenadie (contraction of Grenadiers), it was alternatively published with the subtitle Chanson nègre, and was widely popular in Paris at the time of its release.

== Musical analysis ==
The composition is an irregular sentence of 128 bars in two strain lines. The first of the two, which make up the piece, has a musette accompaniment, being the melody in the second strain supported by two other contrapuntal voices. Harmonically, this bass evokes the "musette" attached to many an eighteenth-century gavotte.

== Market impact ==
According to expert Robert Offergeld, after more than 2.000 copies sold in Paris alone, the publishing company, which held the rights to the piece, earned 250,000 Francs in sales before deciding to sell it to another for more 25,000 francs in profits. And since unlicensed copies abounded in Leipzig, London, Berlin, Brussels and Milan, this amount was just a partial estimative of the impact that it aroused on the musical scene of the time. (Note: "'Benacci', a publisher of Lyon who came to Paris expressly to induce me to sell him a manuscript... offered 10,000 francs for the copyright of the Bamboula and Bananier, notwithstanding more than 2,000 copies of the latter had been sold here: my publishers, the 'Escudiers', answered: If you were to offer us 60,000, we should refuse it." (Gottschalk, in a letter to his father dated May 1850) Source: Graham, George Rex (1853). Graham's American monthly magazine of literature, art, and fashion, Vol. 42. G.R. Graham. p. 64. OCLC 1590031.) The last allotment received by Gottschalk from the publisher 'Escudiers' for Le Bananier was so large that he came to think about pushing all his pupils, with the exception of the best ones, over to other teachers at the conservatoire on his return to Paris from Switzerland. The demand for the bulk of his music by the Swiss retailers was surprisingly large enough that his publishing company in Paris could not supply it.

Emile Prudent introduced it to Central Europe. Carl Czerny made a four-hand arrangement of the piece, and Georges Bizet kept it in his repertoire for years, as well as the great pianists Józef Wieniawski and Alfred Jaëll. Moreover, the piece was actually played on the cello by Jacques Offenbach, while the French violinist Léon Reynier rescore it for his instrument, and even a hand-written copy of the piece was found in Alexander Borodin's personal belongings by the Soviet mathematician and musicologist Serge Dianin, which some scholars insist was used as a model for his Polovtsian Dances in his opera Prince Igor.
