= Rule, Britannia! =

1740 British patriotic song

"Rule, Britannia!"
United States Army Band Strings ensemble

"Rule, Britannia!"
Phonograph cylinder recorded by Albert Farrington in 1914 for Edison Records

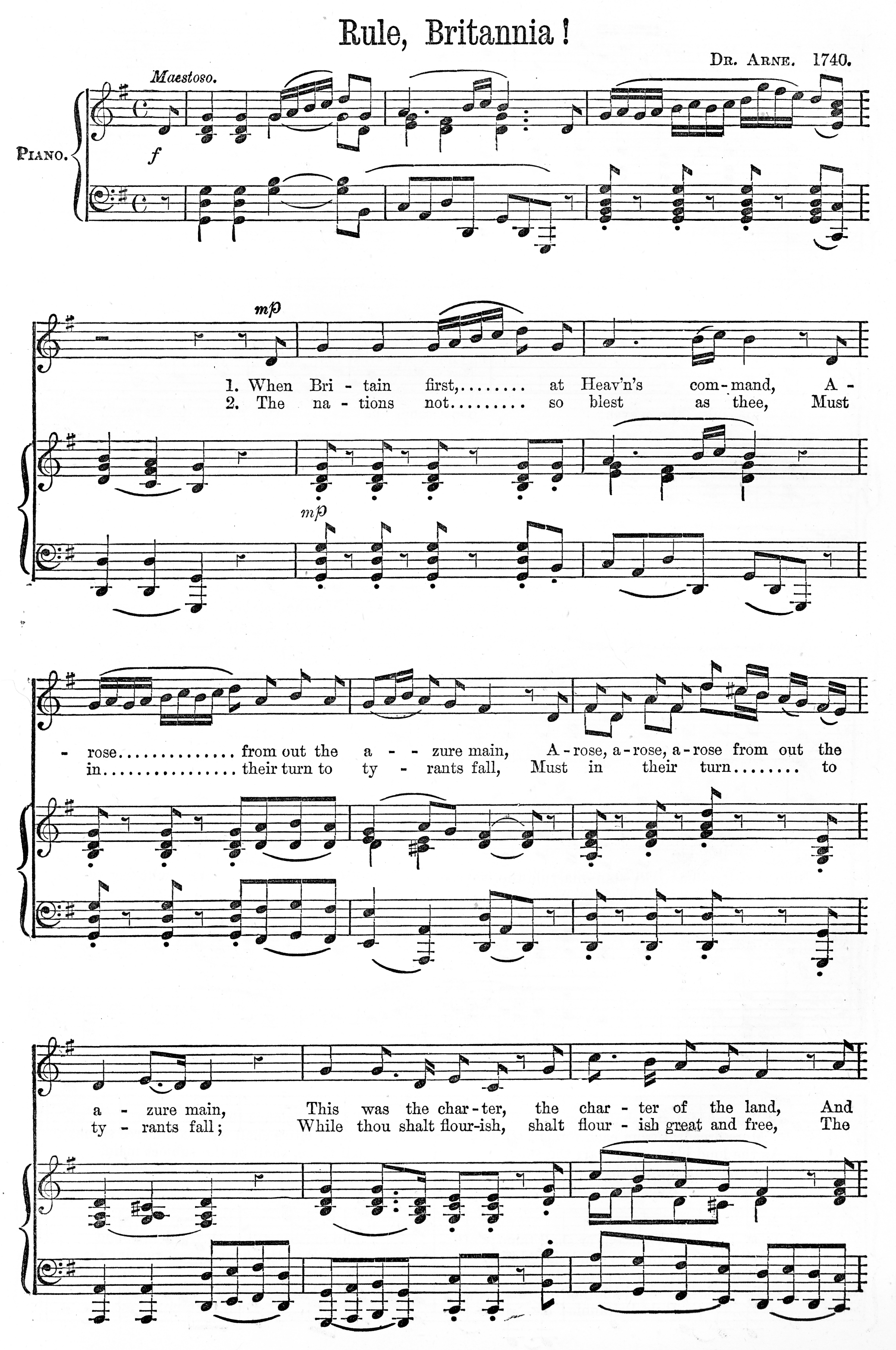
First page of an 1890s edition of the sheet music

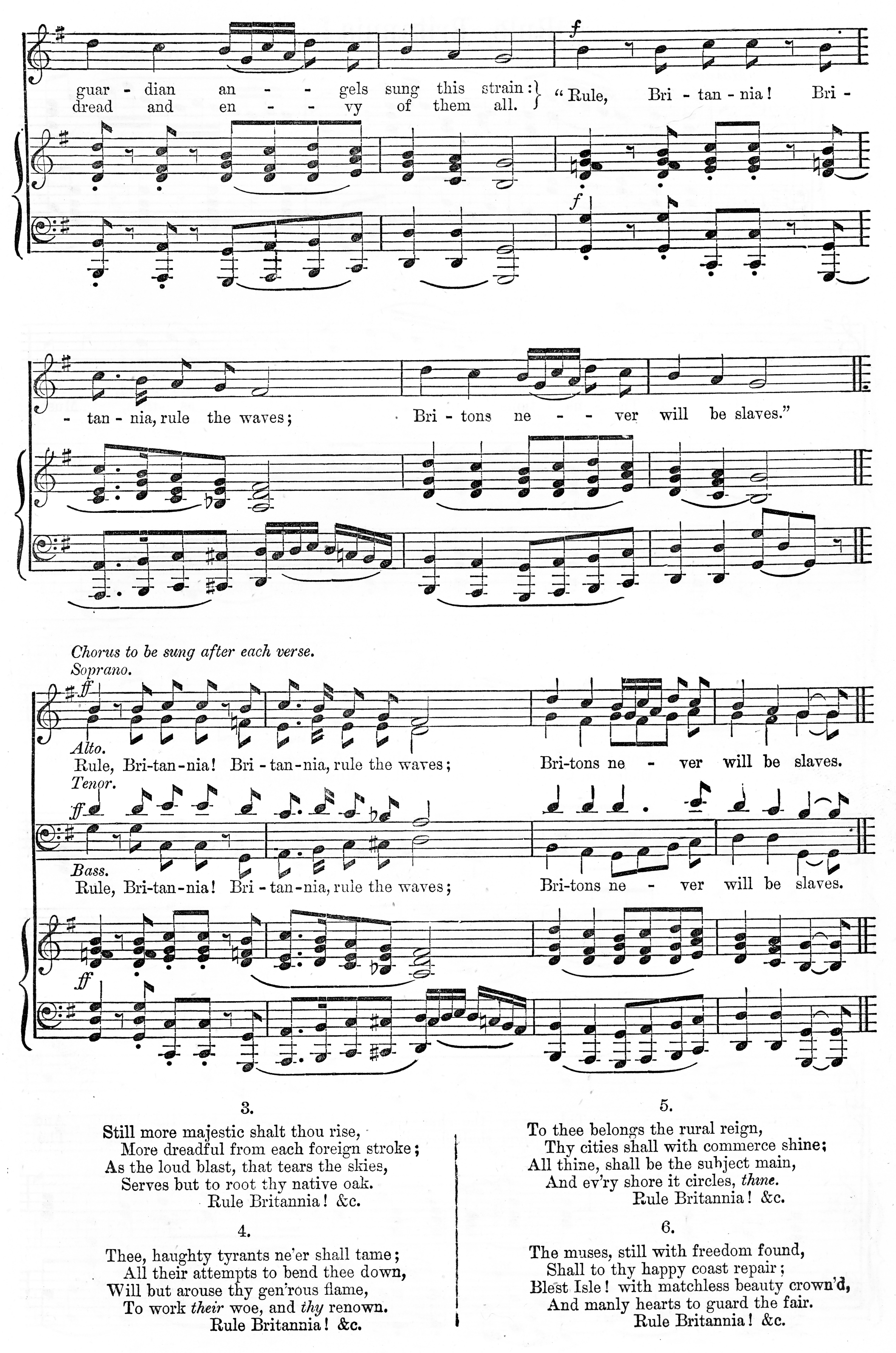
Second page

"Rule, Britannia!" is a British patriotic song, originating from the 1740 poem "Rule, Britannia" by James Thomson and set to music by Thomas Arne in the same year. It is most strongly associated with the Royal Navy but is also used by the British Army. Later in 1940 Malcolm Sargent made his modern arrangement of the song, which he went on to use during the BBC Last Night of the Proms in the decades following after World War 2.

== Alfred ==
The song was originally the final musical number in Thomas Arne's Alfred, a masque about Alfred the Great, co-written by James Thomson and David Mallet and first performed at Cliveden, the country home of Frederick, Prince of Wales, on 1 August 1740.

The work was initially devised to commemorate the accession of Frederick's grandfather George I and the birthday of the Princess Augusta.

== Original lyrics ==
This version is taken from The Works of James Thomson by James Thomson, Published 1763, Vol II, p. 191, which includes the entire text of Alfred.

When Britain first, at Heaven's command
Arose from out the azure main;
This was the charter of the land,
And guardian angels sung this strain:

"Rule, Britannia! rule the waves:
"Britons never will be slaves."

The nations, not so blest as thee,
Must, in their turns, to tyrants fall;
While thou shalt flourish great and free,
The dread and envy of them all.

"Rule, Britannia! rule the waves:
"Britons never will be slaves."

Still more majestic shalt thou rise,
More dreadful, from each foreign stroke;
As the loud blast that tears the skies,
Serves but to root thy native oak.

"Rule, Britannia! rule the waves:
"Britons never will be slaves."

Thee haughty tyrants ne'er shall tame:
All their attempts to bend thee down,
Will but arouse thy generous flame;
But work their woe, and thy renown.

"Rule, Britannia! rule the waves:
"Britons never will be slaves."

To thee belongs the rural reign;
Thy cities shall with commerce shine:
All thine shall be the subject main,
And every shore it circles thine.

"Rule, Britannia! rule the waves:
"Britons never will be slaves."

The Muses, still with freedom found,
Shall to thy happy coast repair;
Blest Isle! With matchless beauty crown'd,
And manly hearts to guard the fair.

"Rule, Britannia! rule the waves:
"Britons never will be slaves."

== "Married to a Mermaid" ==
In 1751 Mallet re-used the text of "Rule, Britannia!", omitting three of the original six stanzas and adding three new ones by Lord Bolingbroke, to form the repeated chorus of the comic song "Married to a Mermaid". This became extremely popular when Mallet produced his masque Britannia at Drury Lane Theatre in 1755.

"Married to a Mermaid" tells the story of a young man, in some versions a sailor or a farmer, who falls overboard from a ship and is married to a mermaid, and later rises from the sea and says goodbye to his comrades and messmates and his ship's captain. It is a traditional sailors' song and regularly performed by choirs, and its lyrics have many versions. A version written, composed and performed by Arthur Lloyd has the lyrics:

'Twas on the deep Atlantic,
Midst Equinoctial gales;
This young farmer fell overboard
Among the sharks and whales;
He disappeared so quickly,
So headlong down went he,
That he went out of sight
Like a streak of light
To the bottom of the deep blue sea.
Singing Rule Britannia,
Britannia rules the waves
Britons never, never, never shall be slaves...

We lowered a boat to find him,
We thought to see his corse,
When up to the top he came with a bang,
And sang in a voice so hoarse,
'My comrades and my messmates,
Oh, do not weep for me,
For I'm married to a mermaid,
At the bottom of the deep blue sea.'
Singing Rule Britannia,
Britannia rules the waves
Britons never, never, never shall be slaves...

He said that as he went down,
Great fishes he did see;
They seemed to think as he did wink,
That he was rather free.
But down he went so quickly,
Saying, ''Tis all up with me,'
When he met a lovely mermaid
At the bottom of the deep blue sea.
Singing Rule Britannia,
Britannia rules the waves
Britons never, never, never shall be slaves...

She came at once unto him,
And gave him her white hand,
Saying, 'I have waited long, my dear,
To welcome you to land.
Go to your ship and tell them,
You'll leave them all for me;
For you're married to a mermaid
At the bottom of the deep blue sea.'
Singing Rule Britannia,
Britannia rules the waves
Britons never, never, never shall be slaves...

The wind was fair, the sails set,
The ship was running free;
When we all went to the captain bold,
And told what we did see.
He went unto the ship's side,
And loudly bellowed he,
'Be happy as you can, my man,
At the bottom of the deep blue sea.'
Singing Rule Britannia,
Britannia rules the waves
Britons never, never, never shall be slaves.

== Symbolism ==
"Rule, Britannia!" soon developed an independent life of its own, separate from the masque of which it had formed a part. First heard in London in 1745, it achieved instant popularity. It quickly became so well known that Handel quoted it in his Occasional Oratorio in the following year. Handel used the first phrase as part of the Act II soprano aria, "Prophetic visions strike my eye", when the soprano sings it at the words "War shall cease, welcome peace!" The song was seized upon by the Jacobites, who altered Thomson's words to a pro-Jacobite version.

According to Armitage "Rule, Britannia" was the most lasting expression of the conception of Britain and the British Empire that emerged in the 1730s, "predicated on a mixture of adulterated mercantilism, nationalistic anxiety and libertarian fervour". He equates the song with Bolingbroke's On the Idea of a Patriot King (1738), also written for the private circle of Frederick, Prince of Wales, in which Bolingbroke had "raised the spectre of permanent standing armies that might be turned against the British people rather than their enemies". Hence British naval power could be equated with civil liberty, since an island nation with a strong navy to defend it could afford to dispense with a standing army which, since the time of Cromwell, was seen as a threat and a source of tyranny.

At the time it appeared, the song was not a celebration of an existing state of naval affairs, but an exhortation. Although the Dutch Republic, which in the 17th century presented a major challenge to English sea power, was obviously past its peak by 1745, Britain did not yet "rule the waves", although, since it was written during the War of Jenkins' Ear, it could be argued that the words referred to the alleged Spanish aggression against British merchant vessels that caused the war. The time was still to come when the Royal Navy would be an unchallenged dominant force on the oceans. The jesting lyrics of the mid-18th century would assume a material and patriotic significance by the end of the 19th century.

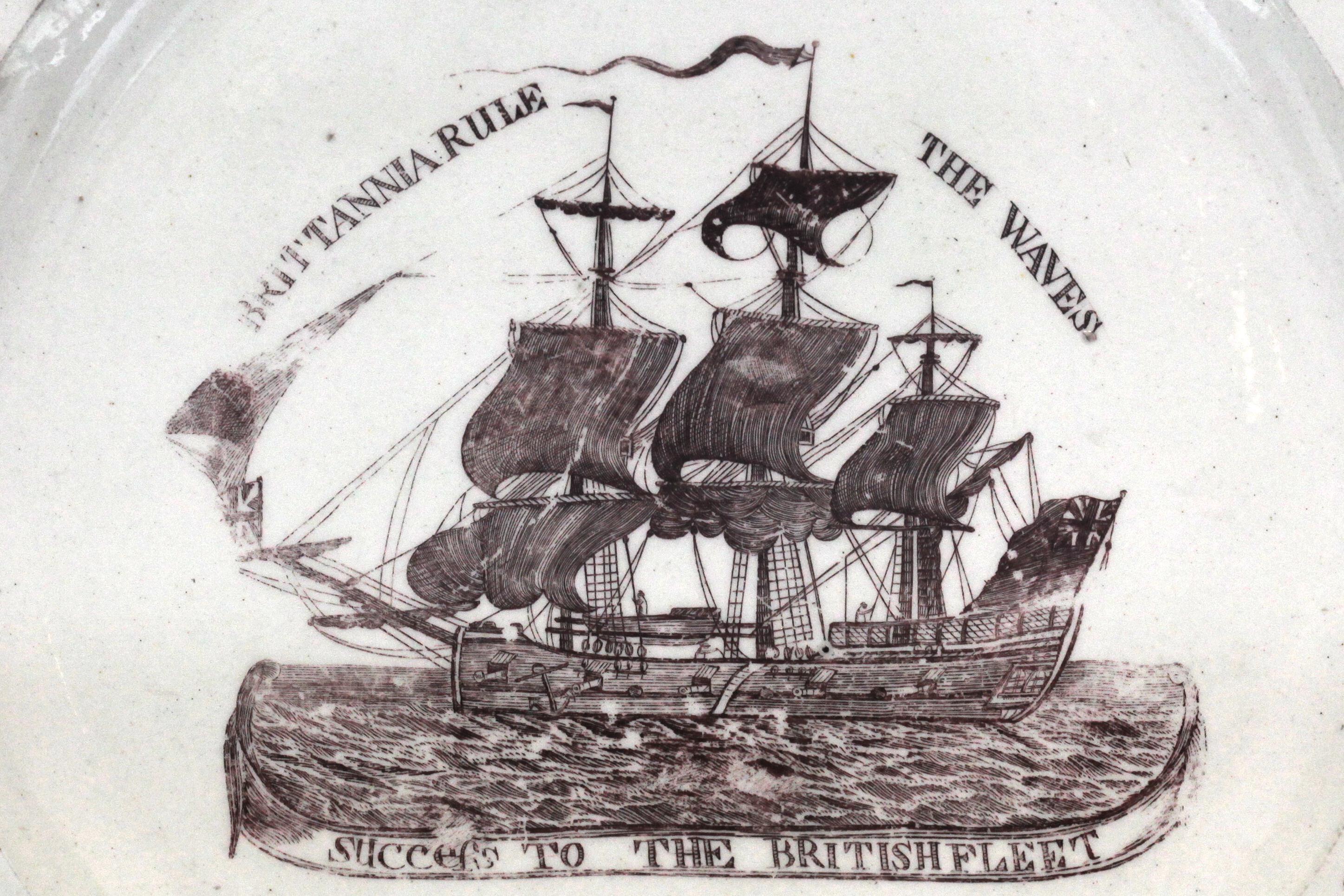
Britannia rule the waves: decorated plate made in Liverpool circa 1793–1794 (Musée de la Révolution française).

"Rule, Britannia!" is often written as simply "Rule Britannia", omitting both the comma and the exclamation mark, which changes the interpretation of the lyric by altering the punctuation. Richard Dawkins recounts in his 1976 book The Selfish Gene that the repeated exclamation "Rule, Britannia! Britannia, rule the waves!" is often rendered as "Rule, Britannia! Britannia rules the waves!", changing the meaning of the verse. This addition of a terminal 's' to the lyrics is used as an example of a successful meme.

Maurice Willson Disher notes that the change from "Britannia, rule the waves" to "Britannia rules the waves" occurred in the Victorian era, at a time when the British did rule the waves and no longer needed to be exhorted to rule them. Disher also notes that the Victorians changed "will" to "shall" in the line "Britons never shall be slaves".

The song assumed extra significance in 1945 at the conclusion of World War II when it was played at the ceremonial surrender of the Japanese imperial army in Singapore. A massed military band of Australian, British and American forces played as Supreme Allied Commander Louis Mountbatten, 1st Earl Mountbatten of Burma arrived.

"Rule, Britannia!" (in an orchestral arrangement by Sir Malcolm Sargent) is traditionally performed at the BBC's Last Night of the Proms, normally with a guest soloist (past performers have included Jane Eaglen, Bryn Terfel, Thomas Hampson, Joseph Calleja, and Felicity Lott). It has always been the last part of Sir Henry Wood's 1905 Fantasia on British Sea Songs, except that for many years up until 2000, the Sargent arrangement has been used. However, in recent years the inclusion of the song and other patriotic tunes has been much criticised—notably by Leonard Slatkin—and the presentation has been occasionally amended. For some years the performance at the Last Night of the Proms reverted to Sir Henry Wood's original arrangement. When Bryn Terfel performed it at the Proms in 1994 and 2008 he sang the third verse in Welsh. The text is available at Rule Britannia (in Welsh).

== Musical derivatives ==
Arne's tune has been used by, or at least quoted by, a great many composers of which the following are a few examples.

The melody was the theme for a set of variations for piano by Ludwig van Beethoven (WoO 79, 1803) and he also used it in "Wellington's Victory", Op. 91 (1813) and in extracted and varied form in the second movement of his Piano Sonata No. 24, Op. 78, "À Thérèse" (1809).

The music has been used for the American patriotic song Rise Columbia!

It was also quoted in Combat naval ("Britannia: an allegorical overture") by Daniel Steibelt.

Richard Wagner wrote a concert overture in D major based on the theme in 1837 (WWV 42). He subsequently made it the basis of his "Große Sonata" for piano, Op. 4. Ferdinand Ries quotes from it in "The Dream" (also known as "Il sogno") for piano, Op. 49, and wrote Variations on Rule Britannia for orchestra, Op. 116. Johann Strauss I quoted the song in full as the introduction to his 1838 waltz "Huldigung der Königin Victoria von Grossbritannien" (Homage to Queen Victoria of Great Britain), Op. 103, where he also quotes the British national anthem "God Save the Queen" at the end of the piece. Johann Wilhelm Hässler quotes part of the theme in the last movement of his Grand Concert Op. 50.

The French organist-composer Alexandre Guilmant included this tune in his Fantaisie sur deux mélodies anglaises for organ Op. 43, where he also makes use of the song "Home! Sweet Home!". Likewise, the French composer Alexandre Goria used the tune as part of his Salut à la Grande Brétagne – Six airs anglese transcrite et variée, 1re. Suite No. 8, Op. 44.

Arthur Sullivan quoted from "Rule, Britannia!" on at least three occasions in music for his comic operas written with W. S. Gilbert and Bolton Rowe. In Utopia, Limited (1893), Sullivan used airs from "Rule, Britannia!" to highlight references to Great Britain. In The Zoo (written with Rowe in 1875) Sullivan applied the tune of "Rule, Britannia!" to an instance in which Rowe's libretto quotes directly from the patriotic march. Finally, to celebrate the jubilee of Queen Victoria in 1887, Sullivan added a chorus of "Rule, Britannia!" to the finale of HMS Pinafore, which was playing in revival at the Savoy Theatre. Sullivan also quoted the tune in his 1897 ballet Victoria and Merrie England, which traced the "history" of England from the time of the druids up to Queen Victoria's Diamond Jubilee, which the work was meant to celebrate.

== Chart performance ==
During the 2020 BBC Proms, held at the Royal Albert Hall, London, a recorded version of the song featuring Welsh mezzo-soprano Della Jones charted at number 10 on the UK Singles Chart.

=== Weekly charts ===
Weekly chart performance for "Rule Britannia"
Chart (2020)	Peak position
UK Singles (Official Charts)	10

== Bibliography ==
- Arne, Thomas (1753). The Masque of Alfred. London: I Walsh. Note the repetition of the second line and of the word "Britannia" in the first line of the chorus.
- Thomas Augustine Arne: Alfred. Musica Britannica vol. XLVII, editor: Alexander Scott, Stainer & Bell, London 1981, ISBN 0-85249-476-9 (full score, Urtext edition)
