= Vialon =

Vialon is a surname. Notable people with the surname include:

- Antoine Vialon (1814–1866), French draftsman
- Jutta Vialon (1917–2004), German photographer
