= Cliveden on Thames =

Painting by J. M. W. Turner

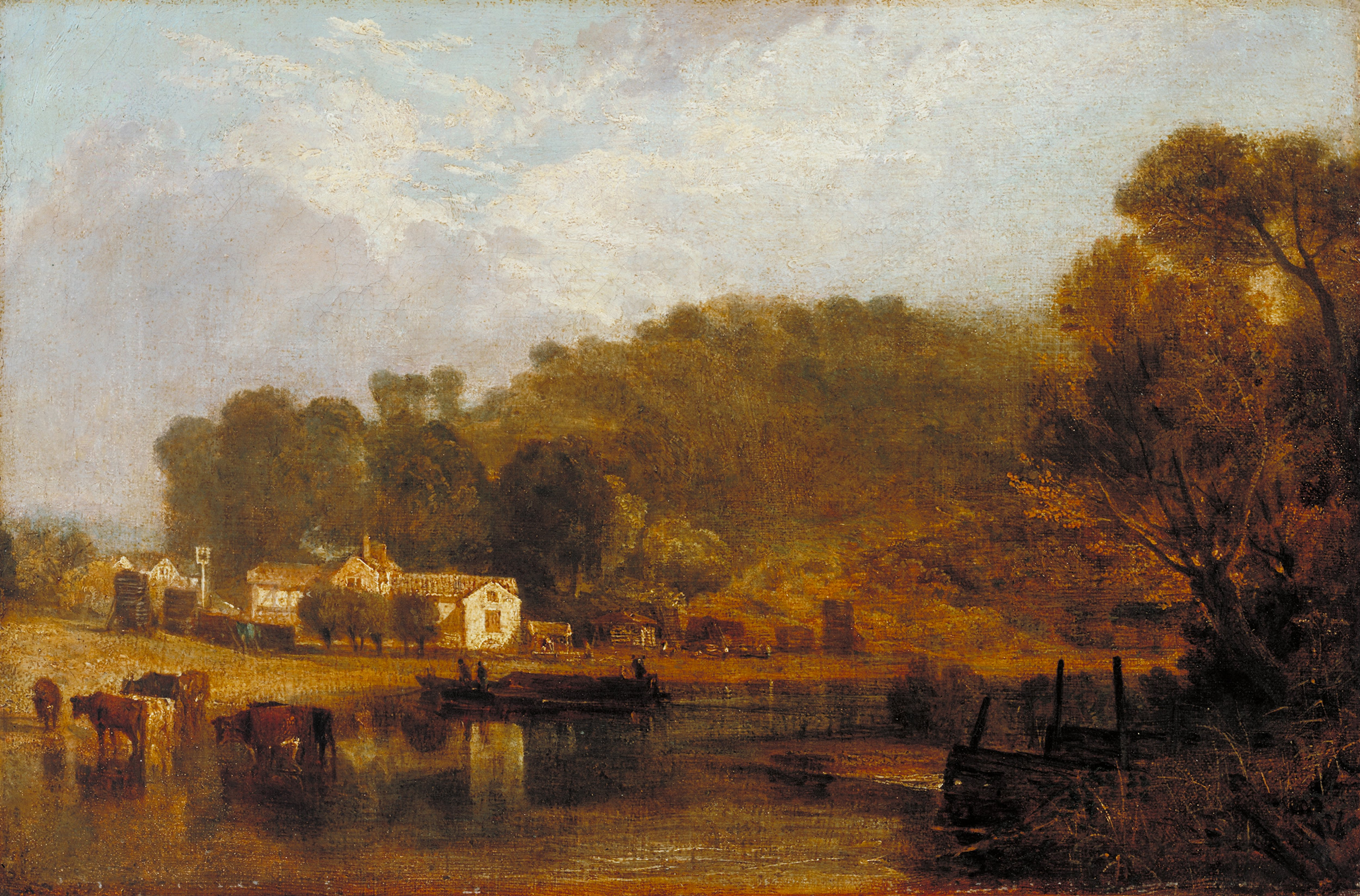
- Artist: J. M. W. Turner
- Year: 1807
- Type: Oil on canvas, landscape painting
- Dimensions: 392 cm × 590 cm (154 in × 230 in)
- Location: Tate Britain, London
- Website: www.tate.org.uk/...n01180

'Cliveden on Thames is a c.1807 landscape painting by the British artist J.M.W. Turner. It depicts a view on the River Thames at Cliveden in Buckinghamshire., a location associated with the premier of the patriotic song Rule Britannia. Turner, frequently took his boat along the river to record scenes of the English countryside during the decade.

Rather than submit the painting to the Summer Exhibition of the Royal Academy of Arts, Turner displayed it at his own studio in Queen Anne Street in Marylebone. When the American-born President of the Royal Academy Benjamin West visited to view it and other pictures he described himself as "disgusted with what he found there; views on the Thames, crude blotches, nothing could be more vicious".

Today the painting is on the collection of the Tate Britain in Pimlico, having been bequeathed to the National Gallery in 1885 and subsequently transferred to the Tate in 1912.

== See also ==
- List of paintings by J. M. W. Turner

== Bibliography ==
- Ackroyd, Peter. Thames: Sacred River. Random House, 2008.
- Bailey, Anthony. J.M.W. Turner: Standing in the Sun. Tate Enterprises, 2013.
- Gage, John. Turner: Rain, Steam and Speed. Allen Lane, 1972.
- Wright, Christopher, Gordon, Catherine May & Smith, Mary Peskett. British and Irish Paintings in Public Collections: An Index of British and Irish Oil Paintings by Artists Born Before 1870 in Public and Institutional Collections in the United Kingdom and Ireland. Yale University Press, 2006.
