= Samuel Sanford =

American pianist and educator (1849 - 1910)

Samuel Simons Sanford (15 March 1849 – 6 January 1910) was an American pianist and educator.

== Early life ==
He was born in Bridgeport, Connecticut.

== Education ==
He studied piano in New York with William Mason (son of Lowell Mason and student of Franz Liszt and Ignaz Moscheles). He went to Paris and studied with Alfred Jaëll, Louis Plaidy (teacher of Hans von Bülow and many others), Théodore Ritter (another student of Liszt), and Édouard Batiste. In 1869, he became acquainted with Anton Rubinstein, and later studied with him.

== Career ==
He travelled with Rubinstein during his first American tour in 1872–73. Ignacy Jan Paderewski changed his execution of octave playing after hearing Sanford play, and once described Sanford as the most musically gifted person he ever knew.

Sanford brought Sir Edward Elgar's music to American attention through the brothers Walter and Frank Damrosch and Theodore Thomas. He was instrumental in having Elgar awarded an honorary doctorate in music from Yale University in 1905; at the conferral ceremony on 28 June, Elgar's Pomp and Circumstance March No. 1 was played, instituting the tradition of playing noble processional music at graduation ceremonies. Later that year, Elgar returned the compliment by dedicating his Introduction and Allegro to Sanford.

Sanford joined the Yale Music Faculty as Professor of Applied Music in 1894, along with Horatio Parker as Professor of Theory. During the sixteen years he worked at Yale, he refused to be paid any salary as he was independently wealthy.

He died at home on 6 January 1910 after a long illness.

== Sanford Medal ==
In 1972 Yale University instituted the Samuel Simons Sanford Medal (usually referred to as the Sanford Medal), to honour celebrated concert artists and distinguished members of the music profession. Recipients have included:

- 1972: Eugene Ormandy
- 1975: Doriot Anthony Dwyer
- 1983: Louis Krasner
- 1983: Maureen Forrester
- 1991: Richard F. French
- 1997: Dorothy DeLay
- 1999: Keith Wilson
- 2000: H.M. King Bhumibol Adulyadej of Thailand
- 2002: Lili Chookasian
- 2003: Andrew Litton
- 2005: Robert Blocker
- 2005: Richard Stoltzman
- 2010: Vivian Perlis
- 2012: Joseph W. Polisi
- 2013: Willie Ruff
- 2013: Peter Gelb
- 2015: Klaus Heymann
- 2015: Yo-Yo Ma
- Emanuel Ax, Pierre Boulez, Alfred Brendel, Aaron Copland, Richard Goode, Marilyn Horne, Sherrill Milnes, Mstislav Rostropovich, Robert Shaw, Sir Georg Solti, Isaac Stern, Randall Thompson, and Virgil Thomson.

== Sources ==
- World-Renowned Clarinetist Richard Stoltzman was Presented Prestigious Sanford Medal by Yale School of Music on Thursday, September 1, 2005
