= Fantaisie brillante sur des motifs de V. Bellini =

Fantaisie brillante sur des motifs de V. Bellini (also Souvenir du Théâtre Italien: 1re. and 2me. fantaisie brillante sur des motifs de l'Opéra Norma et Sonnambula) are a pair of one-movement piano compositions written in E♭ major by French virtuoso pianist Alexandre Goria in 1846 and first published in Mainz in 1847 by B. Schott Sohne. They were dedicated to Madame L. Pillot of Douai.

== See also ==
- List of compositions by Alexandre Goria
