= Jean-Maurice Bourges =

19th century French composer

Jean-Maurice Bourges (Bordeaux, 2 December 1812 - Paris, 15 March 1881), distinguished musical critic, translator and composer who came early to Paris to study composition under Auguste Barbereau. He became joint-editor for Revue et gazette musicale de Paris from 1839, which acquired an excellent reputation in great measure owing to him.

He made a translation of the words of St. Matthew Passion by Johann Sebastian Bach in 1843, the oratorio Paulus by Mendelssohn in 1844 and Brandus' edition of Elijah (1851), and several librettos of operas by Carl Maria von Weber until writing his own comic opera La Sultana in 1846, successfully produced at the Opéra Comique. He died in 1881, after an illness of many years.

== Selected works ==
=== Opera ===
- Le Choix d'une Amie, Opéra-comique en un acte. Paroles et musique de M. Bourges.
- Le Pandour, Fragments d'opéra-comique. Paroles et musique de M. Bourges.
- L'éventail d'Espagne, Opéra-comique en deux actes. Paroles et musique de M. Bourges.
- Sultana, Opéra-comique en un acte. Paroles de Edouard Monnais et de Auguste de Forges; premiered 16 September 1846 in Paris at the Théâtre Royal de l'Opéra Comique

=== Chamber music ===
- Piano Trio No. 1 in A minor
- Piano Trio No. 2
- Quatuor pour deux violons (Quartet for Two Violins)
- Romance for violin and piano
- 3 Sonatas for violin and piano
1. Sonate en Si bémol
2. Sonate en Fa mineur
3. Sonate en Ré majeur
- Sonate en sol (Sonata in G) for viola and piano
- String Quartet

=== Piano ===
- Amaryllis, Redowa
- Chant du Cloître
- Daphné, Schottisch
- Le Bouquet de Marguerite, Valse
- Ouverture d'un opéra comique inédit
- Paolina, Valse
- Speranza, Mélodie

=== Piano 4-hands ===
- Alfaïma, sultane de Grenade, Symphonie chevaleresque en quatre parties pour piano à 4 mains
1. Marche funèbre
2. Grenade au temps des Maures
3. Nuit de fête aux jardins du généralife
4. Le jugement de Dieu
- Le Couronnement de la Rosière pour piano à 4 mains
- Marche cortège pour piano à 4 mains
- Marche des Francs Vainqueurs à Tolbiac, Composition de caractère pour piano à 4 mains
- 4 Pièces à quatre mains pour piano
1. Cortège-Ballet
2. Les Noces d'Or
3. Musette Tambourin
4. Tertullia.
- 5 Pièces de caractère pour piano à 4 mains
1. 1er Fragment de Ballet
2. 2e Fragment de Ballet
3. Marche-Cortège pour une Féerie
4. Procession de Pénitents, Marche
5. Marche Noble
- Scène de Village pour piano à 4 mains

=== Vocal and choral ===
- Ave Maria, Motet
- Ave, Regina coelorum, Chœur à 4 parties
- Ave Verum, Motet
- Beata Genovefa, Oratorio
- Chant d'étudiants, Solo et canon à 3 parties avec accompagnement de piano. Paroles et musique par M. Bourges.
- 3 Chants religieux à 4 et 7 parties avec accompagnement d'orgue ou piano. Paroles et musique de M. Bourges.
1. Réveil de Matines, Chœur à 4 parties
2. Motet Funèbre à 4 parties
3. Les Cloches de Pâques, à 7 parties
- 3 Chœurs à 4 parties pour 2 dessus, ténor et basse avec accompagnement de piano. Paroles et musique de M. Bourges.
1. Les Anges des Orphelins
2. Herminie chez les Bergers
3. Le Réveil des Chasseurs
- 5 Chœurs ou Trios avec accompagnement de piano. Paroles et musique de M. Bourges.
1. L'Adieu des Compagnons, Chœur à 3 parties pour voix d'hommes sans accompagnement
2. Sérénade à 3 voix d'hommes
3. Adieu à l'Épousée, Chœur-Trio
4. La Matineuse, Trio de salon
5. Les Willis de Saintonge, à 3 parties
- Dans la Retraite, Trio de salon pour deux dessus et un baryton avec accompagnement de piano. Paroles et musique de M. Bourges.
- Derniers beaux jours, Chant d'automne pour mezzo-soprano et contralto ou baryton et basse avec accompagnement de piano. Paroles et musique de M. Bourges.
- Inviolata, Motet à 4 parties
- L'Adieu des Compagnons, Chant en chœur à 3 parties pour voix d'hommes sans accompagnement. Paroles et musique de M. Bourges.
- Laudate Dominum, Motet
- Le Chant de l'Orgie, Chant à 2 parties pour voix d'hommes avec accompagnement de piano. Paroles et musique de M. Bourges.
- Le Fils prodigue, Oratorio français d'après la parabole du Chapitre XV. de l'Évangile selon St. Luc. Paroles et musique de M. Bourges.
- Le Triomphe de l'Amour, Chœur à 5 parties avec accompagnement de piano. Paroles de Jean de La Fontaine.
- Les Religieux du Saint-Bernard, Chœur à 4 parties sans accompagnement. Paroles et musique de M. Bourges.
- Les Songes Heureux, Chœur de salon à 3 parties avec solo et accompagnement de piano. Paroles et musique de M. Bourges.
- Messe à quatre voix
- Moïse sur le Nil, Oratorio française
- 29 Motets à une, deux, trois et 4 voix avec accompagnement d'orgue ou de piano
- O sacrum Convivium, Motet
- O Salutaris, Motet
- O Salutaris hostia, Chœur
- Regina coeli laetare, Chœur à 3 parties
- Salve Regina, Motet à 2 voix
- Sancta Maria, ora pro nobis, Cantique
- Solitudine, ou Loin d'Elle, Mélodie pour baryton ou mezzo-soprano avec violon obligé et accompagnement de piano. Musique et texte français par M. Bourges.
- Stabat à 4 voix avec accompagnement d'orgue ou de piano
- Veni Creator Spiritus
