= Alfred Jaëll =

Austrian pianist (1832–1882)

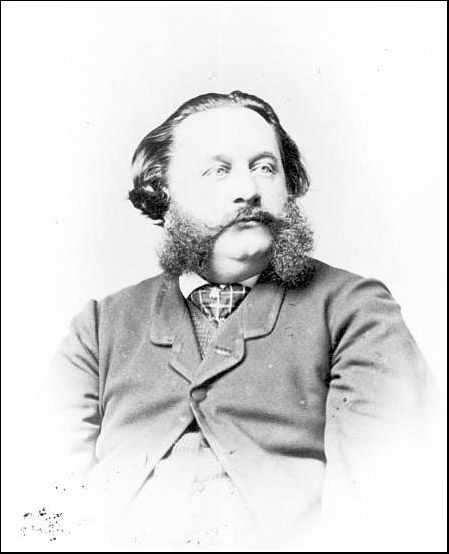
Alfred Jaëll

Alfred Jaëll (5 March 1832 – 27 February 1882) was an Austrian pianist. His students included Benjamin Johnson Lang and Samuel Sanford (the eponym of the Sanford Medal).

== Life ==
He was born in Trieste, then in the Austrian Empire. He studied under Carl Czerny and began his public career at the age of 11, appearing at the Teatro San Benedetto, Venice, in 1843. The following year he studied with Ignaz Moscheles in Vienna. In 1845 and 1846 he lived in Brussels, then Paris. According to one source, he was a student of Chopin, and according to another, he was a student of Liszt; however, most sources make no mention of these associations.

Jaëll made a tour of the United States, which was so successful that he stayed for three years, from 1851 to 1854. He made his New York City debut on 15 November 1851, to ecstatic reviews. At his second concert on 22 November, he introduced Adelina Patti to the American public. He also gave recitals with Ole Bull. He was generally acknowledged to be the finest pianist ever to have visited North America up to that time. He took some of Louis Moreau Gottschalk’s works into his repertoire and helped to popularise them. He returned to Europe in 1854. He was made court pianist to the King of Hanover in 1855. He performed in London in 1862 and 1866.

In 1866 he married Marie Trautmann, a French pianist, composer and writer of pedagogical works. They toured together, performing their own works as well as the standard repertoire. He was one of Henryk Wieniawski’s accompanists for his famous performances of Beethoven’s Kreutzer Sonata. He was the soloist in the London premiere of Joachim Raff’s Piano Concerto in 1875.

Alfred Jaëll died suddenly in Paris in 1882, aged only 49, leaving Marie a 35-year-old widow. He left a number of "extremely effective" transcriptions from Wagner, Schumann and Mendelssohn, as well as original compositions, all now forgotten.

== Sources ==
- Grove’s Dictionary of Music and Musicians, 5th edition, 1954
- Marie-Laure Ingelaere, Alfred Jaëll, ami de Brahms et de Liszt : un pionnier. In : Marie Jaëll "un cerveau de philosophe et des doigts d'artiste"/Catherine Guichard, Laurent Hurpeau, Marie-Laure Ingelaere, Thérèse Klipffel, Laure Pasteau, Alexandre Sorel, Christiane de Turckheim. Lyon: Symétrie, 2004, pp. 33–53. Biography and career reconstituted according to the musical press in nineteenth-century.
