= Antoine Vialon =

French draftsman, engraver, music publisher and composer (1814-1866)

Antoine Vialon (17 December 1814 – 4 March 1866) was a French draftsman and engraver who became a music publisher and composer of vocal music later in his life.

== Biographical sketch ==
After playing music of other composers for a while, he began writing and playing his own music. A meticulous artist with a large number of vocal works for one, two, three or four voices with or without accompaniment, he left behind him a collection of musical pieces in numbered and standard notation, some of which won awards in regional choral competitions. He was one of the first propagators of the Galin-Paris-Chevé system, that he later abandoned in favour of a more practical point of view. He was a steadfast and tireless artist who devoted his whole life to his art.

== Works ==
- Fanfare du charlatan
- 3 duos concertants for two violins
- Chœur bouffe, for 3- or 4-part male voice choir à capella
- Danse pour tous, choral quadrille for 3- or 4-part male voice choir
- Souvenirs de l'Orphéon français
- Harmonie el musique chorale en chiffres, œvres dramatiques de Jean-François Lesueur; volume of 25 supplements
