= Alexandre Goria =

French composer, pianist and teacher

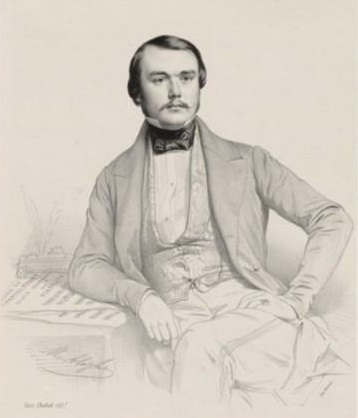
- French composer Alexandre Édouard Goria

Background information
- Genres: Classical
- Occupation: Composer
- Instrument: Piano

Alexandre Édouard Goria (21 January 1823 – 6 July 1860) was a French virtuoso pianist and composer of salon pieces.

== Biography ==
Alexandre Goria was born in Paris and admitted as a student at the age of seven to the Conservatoire de Paris on 15 November 1830. He had for piano teachers Adolphe-Francois Laurent (1796–1867), teacher of Jules Massenet, and Pierre-Joseph-Guillaume Zimmerman, teacher of Charles-Valentin Alkan and César Franck, following a course of harmony under the direction of Victor Dourlen shortly thereafter.

In 1834, he won second prize in the competition of piano, being awarded the first prize the following year at the age of 12. He later became répétiteur of the classes of competition in the conservatory. His studies were completed in 1839. Since then, he engaged himself in teaching, becoming a professor at the Maison Impériale de Saint-Denis in 1854 and a well-known figure thereafter in the music world by many different kinds of pieces for the piano.

He was in very good terms with Bohemian composer Carl Czerny when he lived in Vienna for some time, and was also a very close friend of the American composer Louis Moreau Gottschalk, who dedicated his composition Le Bananier to him. Awarded with the Knight's Cross of the Order of Charles III by the Queen of Spain, he died at the age of thirty-seven in Paris on 6 July 1860. following a cerebral convulsion and an aneurysm. His young wife was to follow him a few years later herself suffering from a cruel and painful illness.

== Music ==
Goria wrote over a hundred works for piano, including studies, fantasias, whims, solo concerts, nocturnes of various themes, polkas, mazurkas, lullabies, ballads and "révêries".

== See also ==
- List of compositions by Alexandre Goria
