= Johann Wilhelm Hässler =

German composer, organist and pianist

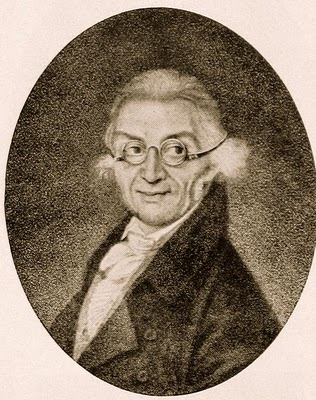
Johann Wilhelm Hässler

Johann Wilhelm Hässler (1747 – 1822), was a German composer, organist and pianist.

Hässler was born in Erfurt. He first studied under his uncle Johann Christian Kittel, who was an organist at Erfurt. His first post was as organist of the local Barfüßerkirche in around 1762. His father died in 1769 and from then on he also managed the family fur business, though he still managed concert tours of Germany in the early 1770s, then in other places in Europe in the 1780s and 1790s. On 15 April 1789 he entered an organ competition with Wolfgang Amadeus Mozart in Dresden during Mozart's Berlin journey. On these tours he also came into contact with Johann Nikolaus Forkel, Johann Adam Hiller, Franz Benda, and Carl Philipp Emanuel Bach. He spent 1790 to 1792 in London and then moved to Saint Petersburg before settling in Moscow in 1794, where he worked as a prominent music teacher and composer. He remained there until his death.

== Works ==
His publications include many keyboard works, including sonatas, fantasies, preludes, and his best known piano work, the Grand Gigue in D minor, Op. 31; as well as a Grand Concert, Op. 50, a cantata, chamber works and songs. One of the most unusual of Hässler's compositions is a cycle of 360 preludes in all keys Op. 47, published in 1817. This massive cycle that lasts for over 95 minutes was premiered in Erfurt by Dmitry Feofanov on September 23, 2012 and in Moscow on September 26, 2012. It was recorded in 2017.
