= Visions fugitives =

1917 piano work by Sergei Prokofiev

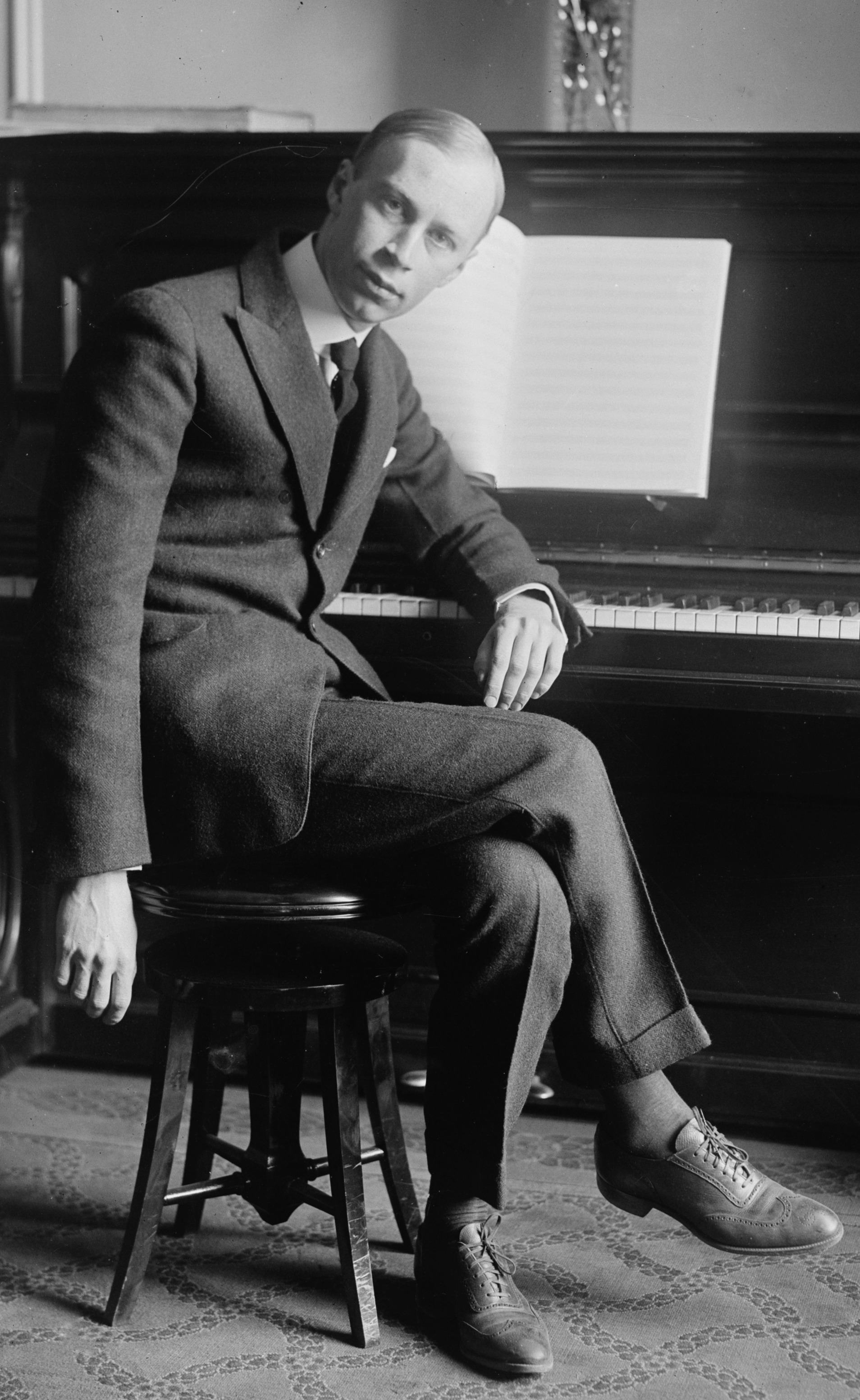
Sergei Prokofiev c. 1918

Visions fugitives, Op. 22, is a cycle of twenty piano miniatures by Sergei Prokofiev. The seventh piece was also published for harp. They were written between 1915 and 1917, individually, many for specific friends of the composer, and premiered by him as a cycle on April 15, 1918, in Petrograd. Gutheil published both the piano set and the one piece for harp in 1917 in Moscow.

The cycle brings dissonant harmonies akin to music by Prokofiev contemporaries Schoenberg and Scriabin but retains original concepts of tonality and rhythm. The miniatures are vignette-like, whimsical, effervescent and bright. The overall effect is in the Impressionist style, not unlike work by Debussy. Because of the almost uniformly mellow style, performers must be willing to work on the relatively difficult technique required to capture its essence.

In 1935 Prokofiev made recordings of ten pieces from the set, and his playing is notable for its wistfulness, subtle shadings and — in places — rhythmic freedom. Even the clowning of the Ridicolosamente is rather shy in Prokofiev’s hands, and the delicacy he brings to the following piece brings out its affinities with Debussy’s Préludes

— David Fanning,

== History ==
In August 1917, Prokofiev played the Visions for Russian poet Konstantin Balmont, among others, at the home of a mutual friend. Balmont was inspired to compose a sonnet on the spot, called "a magnificent improvisation" by Prokofiev, who named the pieces Mimolyotnosti (the plural of Russian мимолётность, 'evanescence') from these lines in Balmont's poem: "In every fleeting vision I see worlds, Filled with the fickle play of rainbows". A French-speaking friend at the house, Kira Nikolayevna, immediately provided a French translation for the pieces: Visions fugitives. Prokofiev often performed only a couple of them at a time as encores at the end of his performances.

== Movements ==
=== 1. Lentamente ===
This short movement, a minute in duration, begins quietly and hesitantly, as if wandering, as the melody does not seem to resolve. The gentle floating chords are like spots of dappled sunshine through a canopy of leaves overhead, ever-changing in the wind, played softly but clearly. However, like the patterns of light, this movement lasts for just a moment. The Lentamente makes certain references to Impressionism due to the use of planing.

=== 2. Andante ===
Like the first movement, this movement is also quiet and hesitant. However, unlike the first movement, the harmonic and melodic structures of this piece are based on diminished harmony, octatonic scales and dissonant intervals of sevenths, making it rather modern. Performance time lasts about a minute and a half.

=== 3. Allegretto ===
This movement is in ternary form, with the middle section being rather more modern than the outer sections. The chords of the right hand in the beginning constitute a fauxbourdon texture, in contrast to the left hand's chromatic passage. The middle section is based on the octatonic scale, with the oscillation of note clusters in the left hand creating a tritone. Performances are approximately forty-five seconds in duration.

=== 4. Animato ===
This movement, a minute in length, is noticeably more lively than its predecessors. The piece is played detached or staccato for the chordal passages and leggiero for the scalar passages. After this section, the piece goes to a slower, more mellow bass melody. The thematic material is accompanied in the left hand by an ostinato in minor thirds.

=== 5. Molto giocoso ===
This twenty-five second piece is uniformly light and playful (rather scherzo-like), probably because the melody is rather disjunct, creating a humorous effect. This piece is polytonal and alternates often between G and G♭ major/F♯ major, but eventually ends with a plagal cadence in G major.

=== 6. Con eleganza ===
This movement is dance-like, with a gently rising melody which quickly blooms and fades away. This piece seems to imply A minor, though this has been undermined in the middle section with the appearance of E♭ and A♭ in the accompaniment. It ends with a perfect cadence in A minor. The performance time lasts around twenty-eight seconds.

=== 7. Pittoresco (Arpa) ===
This movement begins with a narrante bass accompaniment somewhat reminiscent of the opening of Prokofiev's Piano Concerto No. 2. The right hand enters with a fleeting, fairy-like, sparkling melody which seems to develop aimlessly. Close to the end of the movement there is a sudden, dark bass chord played forte, and the movement quickly dies after that. This movement has a performance time of around two minutes.

=== 8. Commodo ===
This movement has one of the more traditional, non-dissonant, melodies of the work, though infused with certain modern elements. The harmonic and formal structures in this piece are based on interval relationships of thirds. The left hand provides a nocturne-style accompaniment for the piece. The piece is slightly over one minute in length.

=== 9. Allegro tranquillo ===
A rising right-hand melody breaks into a left-hand run that becomes the new melody, which switches back to a bright melody in the right hand. The bass accompaniment is, in this case, to be played more prominently than usual because it complements the right-hand melody, which is higher up on the keyboard and thus needs support if emphasis is desired. There are some bell-like tones right before the piece ends; its duration is approximately one minute.

=== 10. Ridicolosamente ===
The left hand plays a simple "up-down" motif repeatedly while the right hand begins a dissonant grace-note based melody. The movement, as its title suggests, is jumpy and comical, and usually lasts around a minute and fifteen seconds.

=== 11. Con vivacità ===
This movement's melody is formed almost exclusively of upwards or downwards appoggiatura-like scale fragments interspersed with punctuated, accented dissonances. However, the piece has a short, legato middle section in B♭ minor. A performance lasts about a minute.

=== 12. Assai moderato ===
This movement is noticeably heavier and more depressed than its predecessors. The entire temperament of the piece suggests something is wrong, but in a way which is slightly cautious (as opposed to outright scared), since it is played mostly solidly. The movement lasts about a minute.

=== 13. Allegretto ===
At first listen, this movement appears to return to the wandering style introduced to the audience at the beginning of the work. It quickly develops, however, but this expansion is limited and just as quickly returns to the beginning melody. This movement, in ternary form, is around forty-five seconds in length.

=== 14. Feroce ===
This movement, distinct from all the other movements in the work, is dissonant, commanding and march-like, due to its driving, motoristic rhythm quite characteristic of a toccata. The repeating syncopated bass notes are a characteristic of this movement, which lasts around a minute.

=== 15. Inquieto ===
This movement's repeating bass immediately creates a sense of urgency until it opens up to a heavily chordal staccato melody that gradually grows in magnitude until one great final shove, after which the piece ends. A performance lasts just under a minute.

=== 16. Dolente ===
This movement is distinctly polyphonic and scalic. In contrast to the previous movement, the thematic material begins with a long, descending chromatic line, making the piece rather mournful; this material repeats five times before the end. The middle section is rather reminiscent of No. 8 with its lyrical accompaniment, with a lighthearted, slurred two-note motive reminiscent of Nos. 10, 11 and 12. The piece, around a minute and a half in duration, ends with a sustained E.

=== 17. Poetico ===
The left-hand melody proceeds unbothered by the lighter right-hand accompaniment (which is, of course, a reversal of normal roles). The piece grows to the top of the keyboard, where both hands participate in a sparkling, nearly trill-like shifting of chords. This movement lasts around fifty seconds.

=== 18. Con una dolce lentezza ===
This movement returns to the wandering style, though it remains somewhat more solid than its predecessors. Performances last about a minute and fifteen seconds.

=== 19. Presto agitatissimo e molto accentuato ===
As its title suggests, this movement is more active and forceful, with a development based upon thirds. The movement abruptly ends with a pounding bass exchange that both hands share. The piece lasts about forty-five seconds.

=== 20. Lento irrealmente ===
The final and longest movement in the suite, requiring just over two minutes to play, appears to be searching for something, and has a slightly exotic melody that includes some partial scalar passages. These, like the rest of the pieces in the set, tend to develop towards the top of the keyboard before coming down for further bass development.

It is in ternary form, each section lasting exactly eight measures.
