= Alfred Quidant =

French pianist, composer and music teacher

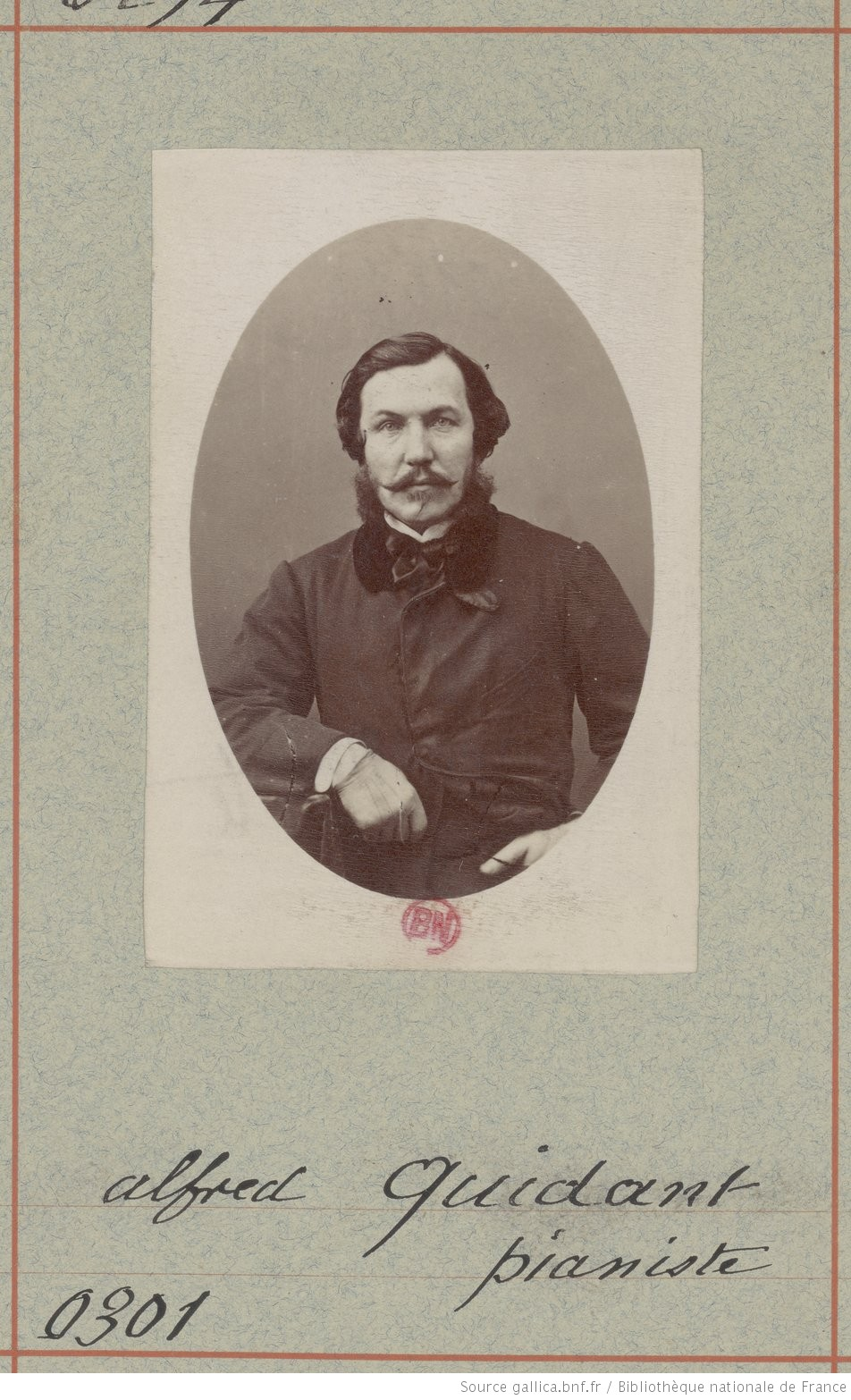
Portrait of Alfred Quidant

Pierre Robert Joseph (Alfred) Quidant (7 December 1815 – 9 October 1893) was a French pianist, composer and music teacher.

== Biography ==
Born in Lyon, the son of a merchant of musical instruments, he began studying music and piano in his hometown. In 1831, he went to study at the Conservatoire de Paris, but interrupted his studies to work for Sébastien Érard as piano demonstrator, a job that he held for more than thirty years.

Quidant wrote mainly salon music, which became popular during his time. His pupils include Conrad Ansorge, Arthur de Greef, and Emil von Sauer.

He died in Paris.

Quidant had a son named R. Alfred Quidant (1856–1933).

== Selected works ==
- La Fête au village, grande valse
- Fantaisie, en forme de valse chromatique
- Cantique, ou Fantaisie de Salon, Op. 13
- Mazeppa, grande étude-galop, Op. 21
- Grande étude-valse, Op. 29
- La Marche de l'Univers, fantaisie, Op. 34
- L'Horloge à musique, caprice, Op. 35
