= Émile Prudent =

French pianist and composer

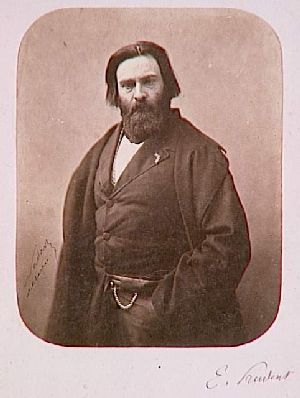
Émile Racine Gauthier Prudent

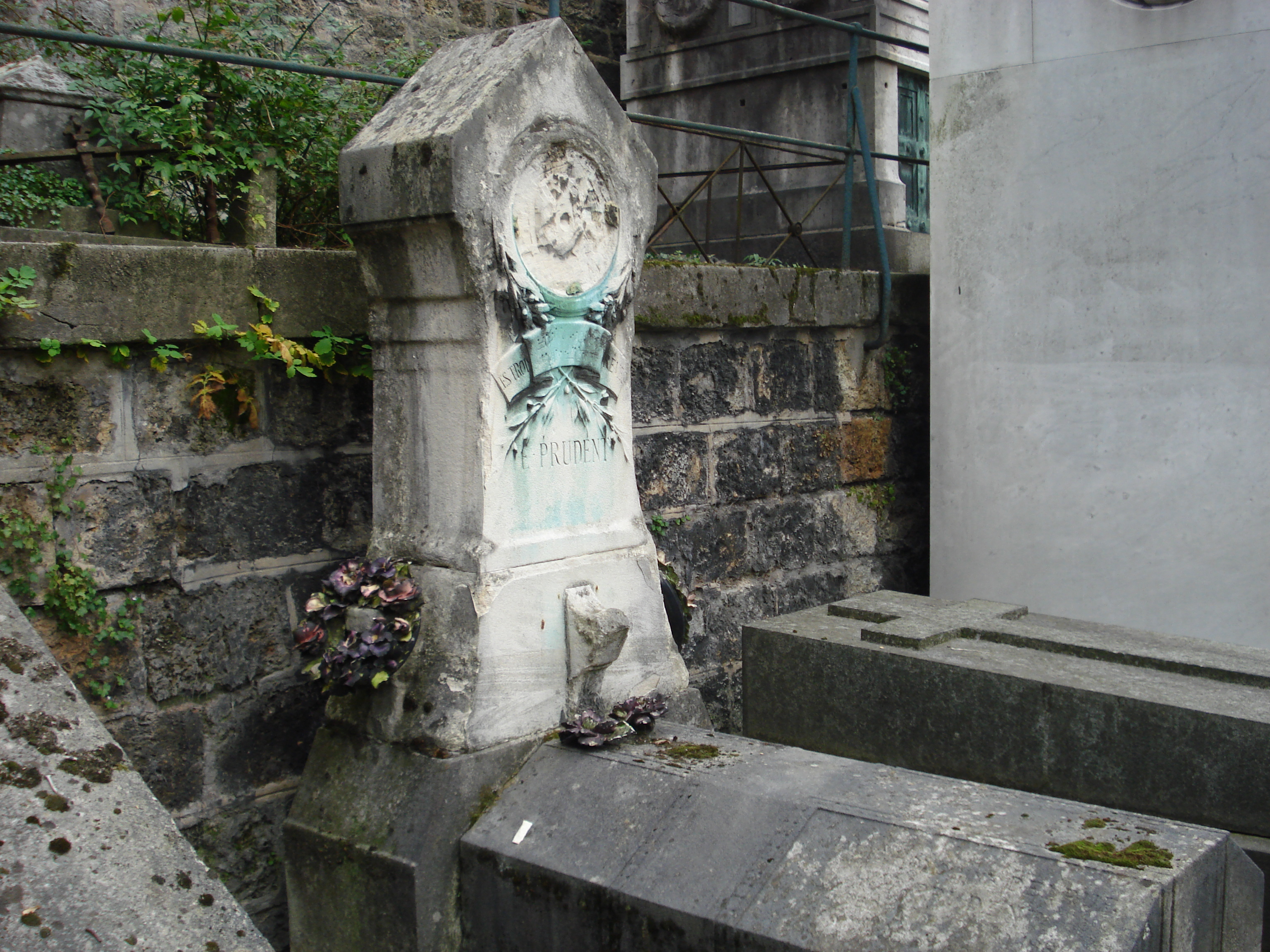
Montmartre Cemetery

Émile Racine Gauthier Prudent (3 February 1817 – 14 May 1863) was a French pianist and composer. His works number about seventy, and include a piano trio, a concerto-symphony, many character pieces, sets of variations, transcriptions and etudes, in addition to his celebrated fantasies on operatic airs. As a teacher, he was very successful and produced several distinguished pupils.

== Biography ==
Born at Angoulême, he never knew his parents and was adopted at an early age by a piano tuner, who gave him his first musical instruction. At the age of ten, he entered the Paris Conservatoire, winning a first prize in piano in 1833, and a second prize in harmony in 1834. Upon graduation from the conservatory, with no patrons, he had to struggle financially for a while before he finally met with success at his first public performance. The concert was shared with the then-renowned virtuoso Sigismond Thalberg. The young Prudent performed his Fantasy on Lucia di Lammermoor, Op. 8, to great public acclaim, leading soon after to constant concertizing in France and abroad, including two trips to England in 1848 and 1852 to premiere his own works. He died in Paris in 1863, where he had spent most of his life.
