= Promenade Theatre Orchestra =

UK orchestra

Promenade Theatre Orchestra (PTO) was an English quartet founded by John White in 1969 and consisted of the composer/performers White, Christopher Hobbs, Alec Hill, and Hugh Shrapnel. Although not one of the Scratch Orchestra's so-called 'sub-groups', the PTO often shared concerts and tours with the Scratch Orchestra as a distinct ensemble.

== Instrumentation and performance style ==
The PTO performed primarily on toy pianos and reed organs, although they also played their own secondary instruments (White on tuba and [trombone], Hobbs on bassoon and percussion, Hill on clarinet and Shrapnel on oboe). The members met each weekend to rehearse, bringing new pieces with them to rehearse. The music mostly reflected the composers' interests in early British experimental repetitive compositional methods, which led to the strict numerical processes called systems music. White had developed music of random processes known as 'Machines'; Hill specialised in music based on English change-ringing systems. Hobbs is best known for his readymades, either of found material or of found systems. Shrapnel's music displays an interest in Victorian salon music models and well as numerical processes.

The PTO's soundworld was often jocular; the sight of four accomplished musicians engrossed in difficult music for toy pianos was, itself, humorous. The sense of fun was amplified by White's advertisements, which promised

The PT Orchestra! The Orchestra YOU can afford for that extra special occasion! Restful reed-organs, tinkling toy pianos, soothing psalteries, suave swanee whistles, jolly jaw harps - NO noisy electronics! (Just the job for that lazy Sunday afternoon!) All musical material guaranteed thru-composed - NO hit-or-miss improvisation!

This advertisement alone set the PTO apart from AMM and the Scratch Orchestra in its denial of modernist processes, at least at the surface level.

== Performances ==
Perhaps the most successful PTO event was a concert at the Orangery, London on 1 October 1972. On a tour of Norway with the Scratch Orchestra in 1973, however, political divisions between members Hill and Shrapnel, who wanted a more political content in PTO music (the Scratch Orchestra at this time had a strong Maoist philosophy among many of its core members), and Hobbs and White, who wanted to maintain the group as it had been. Hobbs and White began the Hobbs-White Duo that year, playing duo piano works, strict percussion systems, and music for their secondary instruments. Shrapnel became a central member in People's Liberation Music, a popular-music ensemble that included Laurie Scott Baker and Cornelius Cardew. The PTO reformed for a day of concerts at the Conway Hall, London, in 2001, in remembrance of the twentieth anniversary of Cardew's death. They played Cardew's early experimental work Octet '61 for Jasper Johns. This piece has one event 'where something happens' notated with an arrow. The PTO chose to charge their glasses with red wine and toast 'to Cornelius'.

== Selected discography ==
- Aran, in 'Recent English Experimental Music', Audio Arts, 3/2 (complements 'Art and Experimental Music' issue, Studio International November/December 1976.
- Promenade Theatre Orchestra, The Orangery: October 1, 1972. Leicester: Experimental Music Catalogue (EMC 102), 2004.

== Sources ==
- Anderson, Virginia (2004). Aspects of British Experimental Music as a Separate Art-Music Culture. PhD thesis, Royal Holloway, University of London.
- Nyman, Michael (2002). Experimental music: Cage and beyond. Cambridge University Press. ISBN 0-521-65383-5
- Senior, Evan (ed.) (1976). Music and musicians, Volume 25.
- Experimental Music Catalogue. Recordings
