= Experimental Music Catalogue =

British publishing company

The Experimental Music Catalogue (commonly known as the EMC) was founded in 1968 by Christopher Hobbs in order to provide an outlet for new music by composers of the English experimental movement, Publications appeared mainly as generic anthologies, such as the Verbal Anthology, String Anthology, Rhythmic Anthology and the Scratch Anthology of Compositions. These anthologies featured music by British composers such as Cornelius Cardew, Hugh Shrapnel, Howard Skempton, Gavin Bryars, John White, and other experimental composers, including those in the Scratch Orchestra, but also others, including Robert Ashley and Terry Jennings.

As the Catalogue grew in the 1970s, Hobbs released control to a committee including Gavin Bryars and Michael Nyman. However, due to the change in music and publishing needs after experimental music turned to minimalism and other post-modern styles, the EMC was wound down in the early 1980s. Hobbs re-established the EMC in 1999 as an online not-for-profit publishing house and information centre, a source for reprints of some of the original EMC music, new music by Hobbs, Dave Smith, Dominy Clements, Hugh Shrapnel, a new edition of Erik Satie's Fils d'etoiles; plus recordings by Michael Parsons, Hobbs, Smith, and British free improvisers such as Hobbs, Bruce Coates, Paul Dunmall, Mike Hurley, and Walt Shaw. The EMC website also contains information on the works of experimental composers, an archive of articles and writings and the Journal of Experimental Music Studies, or Jems (edited by the musicologist Virginia Anderson), a peer-review journal consisting of new articles on experimental music, postmodernism, and minimalism, as well as a reprint archive of articles from Contact: A Journal of New Music and other sources. The slogan of the renascent EMC is 'Experimental Music Since 1969', reflecting the first dated publication, rather than the first output.

== See also ==
- Experimental music
