= Dave Smith (composer) =

English experimental composer

Dave Smith (born August 19, 1949) is an English composer, arranger and musical performer. Since 1971 he has been associated with the English school of experimental music.

== Life and career ==
Smith was born in Salisbury, Wiltshire, England. After attending Solihull School, he read music at Magdalene College, Cambridge. In the 1970s, Smith was a member of the Scratch Orchestra and a participant in several composer/performer ensembles. The first of these was a keyboard duo with John Lewis which played minimalist and systemic works by British and American composers (notably including early works by Philip Glass) as well as by themselves. Several concerts with Michael Parsons and Howard Skempton featured at this time, as did a short-lived five-piano group (with Lewis, Michael Nyman, Orlando Gough and Benedict Mason) and an involvement with the People's Liberation Music group of Laurie Scott Baker, Cornelius Cardew and others. From 1977 he played in John White's Garden Furniture Music Ensemble alongside Mason and Gavin Bryars: his close association with the music of White, Bryars and Cardew has continued ever since. In the 1980s he was a founder-member of the English Gamelan Orchestra and Liria, the first British groups to specialise in, respectively, Javanese classical and Albanian folk musics.

Up to 1977 his music was largely minimalist (process music or systems music). His style quickly developed into a highly eclectic pool of ideas ranging musically from the abstract to the markedly referential and which on occasion is informed by a commitment reminiscent of the later Cardew. His acknowledged "influences" range from Alkan, Ives and Szymanowski to Albanian folk music, Duke Ellington, Tom Dissevelt and those with whom he has worked. The range of ideas is most clearly chronicled in a series of recital-length solo Piano Concerts, works which encompass an entire concert with varieties of styles. Many of his piano works have been encouraged and performed by John Tilbury.

Smith has taught at Finchley Catholic High School (1971–73), Kingsway-Princeton College (1973–84), De Montfort University (1980–97) and the University of Hertfordshire (1997–2021). His work with students has resulted in a large number of arrangements, particularly for tuned percussion groups, as well as performing versions of Grainger's Random Round, Reich's Music for 18 Musicians and several works by Carla Bley. Other arrangements include a solo piano version of Holst's The Planets and reductions for violin and piano of a number of Albanian works for violin and orchestra. He is a member of CoMA (Contemporary Music-making for All) for whom he has composed works for large, flexible ensembles such as Murdoch or Fred West – which is best? Reconsidered (2000), and Whiskies of Islay (2006).

== Selected works ==
- Continuum (with John Lewis) for at least two pianos (1970)
- Swings for two pianos (1974)
- Diabolus maximus for five pianos (1976)
- Diabolus apocalypsis for 2 electric organs, piano and electric piano (1976)
- Moderation in nothing for sopranino recorder/electric piano, ocarina/guitar, wine glasses/bell/voice and electric organ/cymbals (1976)
- Albanian summer for alto saxophone and piano (1980)
- Aragonesca for soprano/alto saxophone, bass clarinet, violin and cello (1987)
- Kaivopuisto for cello or bass clarinet and piano (1996)
- Alban lament for eight instruments and eight voices (1996/8)
- Murdoch or Fred West – which is best? Reconsidered for large flexible ensemble (2000)
- A propos de rien (arranged by Rhodri Davies) for solo harp (1999/2004)
- Whiskies of Islay: eight movements for varied flexible ensembles (2006)
- Natural selections (String quartet no. 2) (2009/10)
- Cuban quartet (String quartet no.1) (1990/2014)
- Around and about for string quartet and piano (2014)
- The myth of Sisyphus (String quartet no.6) (2014/8)
- Off-peak octet for 8 bass clarinets (2018)
- Hunter of stories for speaker and piano (texts by Eduardo Galeano) (2018–9)

== Piano concerts ==
- 1st piano concert – "24 sonatas in all the keys" (1985–6)
- 2nd piano concert – "Ireland one and Ireland free" (1984–93): includes Ireland one and Ireland free, I fought a monster today (spoken text by Bobby Sands), Michael Collins amongst the mapmakers (spoken text by John Mackie) and The Armagh women (spoken text by Margaretta D'Arcy)
- 3rd piano concert (1983–92): includes Toccantella, Al contrario and Guaracha
- 4th piano concert (1988–98): includes African mosaic
- 5th piano concert – "Alla reminiscenza" (1993–4): 1 movement
- 6th piano concert (1994–7): includes Ogives 1, 2 + 3 and Beyond the park
- 7th piano concert (1999–2004): includes Inter alia, Zytnia and Number seven's done a runner
- 8th piano concert (2002–25): includes Symphony in 5 movements dedicated to the memory of John White [Outside, Mécanique 2025, Tiranë hanky, All this and less, Nails], and Frivolous and vexatious
- 9th piano concert (2003–4): 3 movements – On the virtues of flowers, On the virtues of forests and On the virtues of wild birds
- 10th piano concert – "75 one-minute pieces" (2005–12)
- 11th piano concert (2002– ): includes ... and with thy daring folly burn the world, Being born in Gaza is not a crime, In support of the Intifada and 3 Kerala song arrangements
- 12th piano concert (2014– ): includes The myth of Sisyphus

== Publications ==
- Smith, Dave, “Following a straight line: La Monte Young”, Contact, 18, winter 1977–8; republished in the Journal of Experimental Music Studies at:
- Smith, Dave, “The Piano Sonatas of John White”, Contact, 21, autumn 1980; republished in the Journal of Experimental Music Studies at:
- Smith, Dave, “Albus Liber: Exploits and Opinions of John White, Composer Volume I” (Journal of the London Institute of 'Pataphysics), Atlas Press, 2014. ISBN 9781900565240

== Recordings online ==
from 1st Piano concert (1985–6)

- Ramble on themes from Gershwin's Porgy and Bess –
- Nocturne –
- Bossa Nova –
- Biguine –
- Afterhours –

from Whiskies of Islay (2006)

- Caol Ila –
- Lagavulin –

from Aragonesca (1987)

- 1 - Tempo di Son -

Albanian Summer (1980) -

on Experimental Music Catalogue

- Diabolus apocalypsis (1976)
- Moderation in nothing (1976)
- Frivolous and vexatious (2002/14) from 8th Piano concert

See also: Dave Smith (composer) on SoundCloud includes

- African mosaic (1998)
- Alban lament (1996/8)
- ...and with thy daring folly burn the world (2007)
- A propos de rien (arranged Rhodri Davies) (1999)
- Bunnahabhain (Whiskies of Islay) (2006)
- Ethical libertarian scholars (2017)
- I fought a monster today (1984)
- Number seven's done a runner (2000/18)
- On the virtues of flowers (2003)
- Zytnia (2000)
