= Laurie Scott Baker =

British composer and musician (1943–2022)

Laurie Scott Baker (1943 – 16 November 2022) was a British composer and musician of experimental and electronic music. He was a pioneer of live electronics and graphic scores from the 1960s.

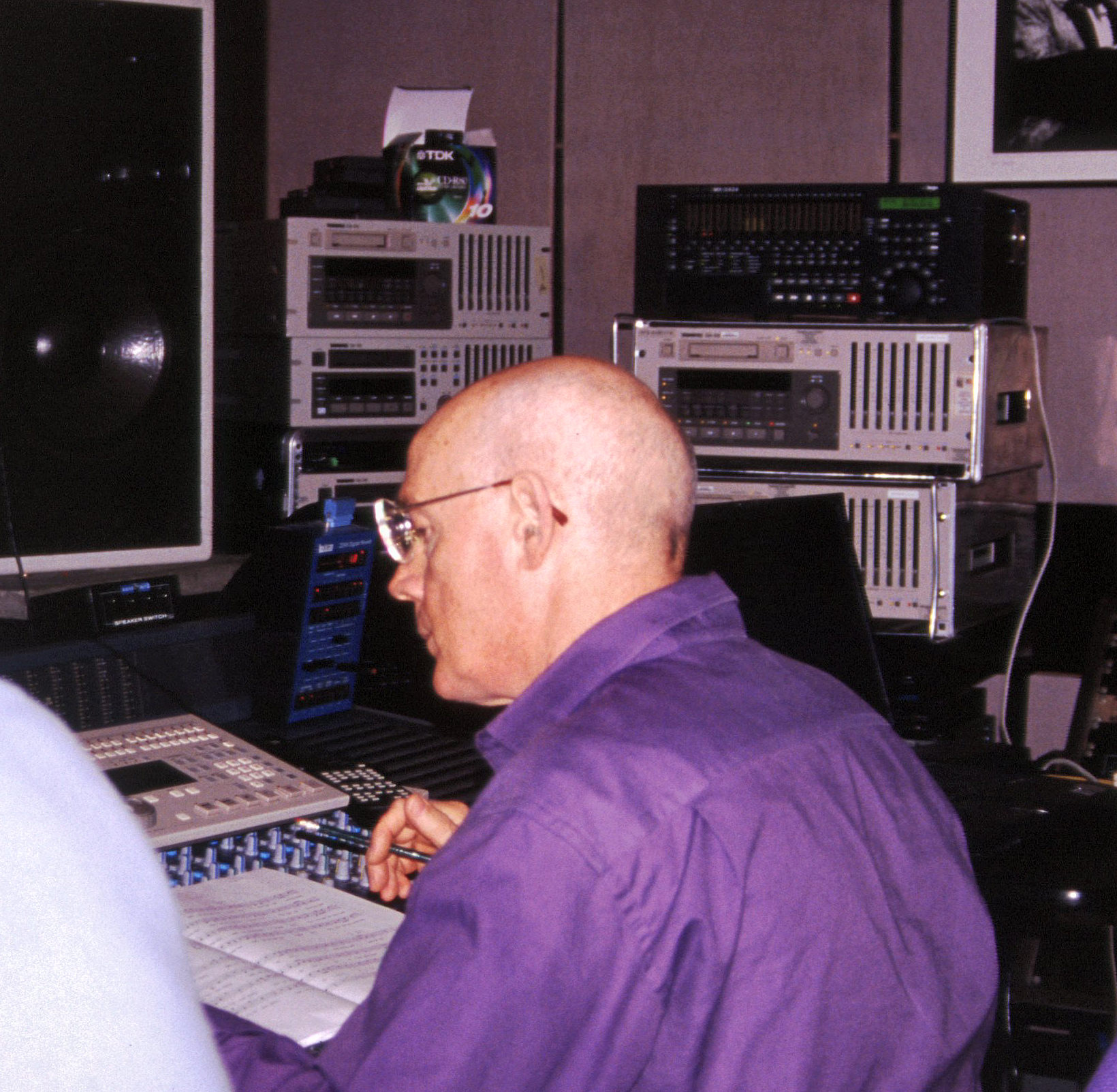
Recording session at Kingston University, 2003

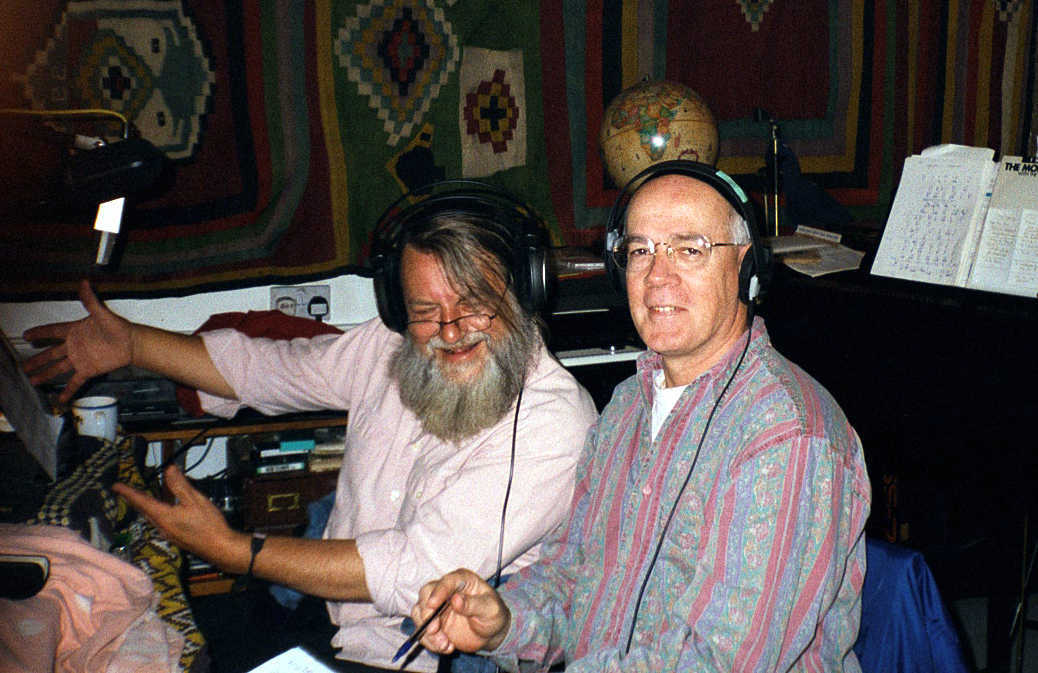
Robert Wyatt and Laurie Scott Baker, 2010

== Career ==
=== Early life ===
Laurence Baker was born 1943 in Sydney, Australia. From 1958 he studied at the Julian Ashton Art School. His musical career began playing double bass at the El Rocco jazz cellar, Sydney's major jazz venue at that time, with his school friend pianist Serge Ermoll. He worked for the Sydney Morning Herald as a trainee graphic artist.

Baker left Australia in 1964, working his passage in the band on the Greek liner Patris.

=== Britain ===
In London he worked on several collective projects with the composer Cornelius Cardew. He took part in Music Now, a concert society founded in 1968 by Victor Schonfield which introduced avant-garde music to British audiences, including the first UK performance of In C and also in the first performances of the composers Frederic Rzewski and John White. He took part in Christian Wolff's 'Burdocks' concert. He was a member of the Scratch Orchestra from its formation in 1969. Following on from this came the formation in 1972 of Peoples' Liberation Music with John Tilbury and John Marcangelo. Baker was a founder member in 1976 of Progressive Cultural Association. He was also active in the Musicians Union and was ACTT shop steward at BBC Wales and later at BECTU.

There were also collaborations with Alan Gowen, Jamie Muir, and Allan Holdsworth in 'Sunship' and with Greg Bright in 'Maze'.

Baker played in various West End theatre productions including Hair (1968). There was also recording session work, including with Manfred Mann, Bob Downes, Ray Russell, Alex Harvey and others. He also composed music for film and television with two songs for the feature film, Secrets (1971) performed by Maggie Bell and another by the Cymarons, an early reggae band.

In 1976 he was commissioned by Unity Records to compose and produce a record celebrating the anniversary of the 1926 British General Strike using traditional working class music forms such as brass bands, industrial ballads, and contemporary rock; John Marcangelo was the composer on the 2nd side. Its final production was blocked by the Arts Council.

In 1977/78 he composed and produced the music for two animations by Geoff Dunbar, Lautrec (1974) and the cult movie UBU (1978). He also worked with Richard Keith Wolff on the short film Still Life (1980).

At the beginning of the 1980s he worked doing film dubbing mixing for the BBC while continuing to compose music for television and radio. In the 1990s he mainly worked on commissions for BBC Radio Drama including several series.

Year	Title	
1990	Burnt	A six-part political thriller by Nigel Baldwin, starring Dennis Waterman
1991	The Monday Play: A Stranger in the Tea Leaves	A play by William Ingram.
1992	Cordoba	A six-part thriller by Nigel Baldwin, starring Alison Steadman
1993	The Monday Play: Much Ado About Nothing	
1997	Broad Canvasses	A three-part drama by Nigel Baldwin

Baker left the BBC in 1995 and returned to full time music as Artistic Director of the Musicnow record label which was set up in 1991.

A short animation. Echidna, was produced for S4C in Wales and shown at several festivals including the Short Film Festival Flickerfest (2004) in Sydney and also on ABC.

The double album Gracility, released in 2009, contains archive recordings from 1969 to 1975 of music composed by Baker. The title track (1969) features Derek Bailey, Keith Rowe, Gavin Bryars, and Evan Parker. Bass Chants & Cues (1972) features John Tilbury and Jamie Muir. The track "Circle Piece", recorded in 1970, was performed by the Scratch Orchestra: Alec Hill, Hugh Shrapnel, Andy Mackay, Chris May, Phil Gebett, Ed Fulton, Bryn Harris, Christopher Hobbs, John White, and Michael Parsons. Evan Parker performs "Pibroch 1926".

In 2013 an exhibition of his graphic scores from the 1960s was held at SNO (Sydney Non Objective Contemporary Art Projects).

== Personal life and death ==
Baker married Brigid Scott in 1967 at Newcastle upon Tyne. Following a stroke he died in Brentford on 16 November 2022. He was buried at GreenAcres Chiltern Woodland Burial Park. A memorial concert was held at St Anne's Church, Kew in 2023.

== Discography ==
Year	Title	
1963/4	Serge Ermoll Trio	
1968	London Cast of Hair	CD Polydor no. 5199732 / LP Polydor no 583 043 stereo
1969	Roman Wall Blues – Alex Harvey	Fontana / STL 5534
1970	Fresh Hair	Polydor no 2371 066 stereo
1972	Bob Downes Open Music - Diversions	LP BDOM001 stereo
	Messin' – Manfred Mann	Vertigo – 6360 087
1975	Words & Music (1975) - Tom Phillips	Limited edition
1994	Flotsam Jetsam – Robert Wyatt	Rough Trade R3112
2002	We Only Want the Earth	Musicnow MNCD004
2007	Consciously	Musicnow MNCD 009
2008	Liquid Metal Dreaming	Musicnow MNCD010
2009	Gracility	Musicnow MNCD012
