= Hugh Shrapnel =

British musician (born 1947)

Hugh Shrapnel (born 1947) is an English composer of contemporary classical music.

== Biography ==
Shrapnel was born in 1947 in Birmingham. From 1966 to 1969, he studied composition at the Royal Academy of Music with Norman Demuth and Cornelius Cardew and oboe with Margaret Eliot winning the Lady Holland Prize for composition.

Shrapnel's music is characterised by its lyricism, its wide range of musical influences including folk music, music hall, jazz and the sound of bells, a deep identification with the natural world, a liking for unorthodox instrumental line ups and a strong feeling for place and community. Musical enthusiasms/influences include: the English Renaissance composers, Schubert, Schumann, Sibelius, Mahler, Stravinsky, Satie, Webern, Ives, Terry Riley, Charles Mingus. John White and Cornelius Cardew. Shrapnel's music has been widely performed in Britain, America, Canada and Germany.

As a student, Shrapnel composed serial works influenced by Webern and Boulez but through Cornelius Cardew became drawn to experimental music. He played the oboe in the first British performance of Terry Riley’s In C in 1968, in the same year joining Cardew's experimental music class at Morley College. Shrapnel was a member of the Scratch Orchestra throughout its existence from its formation in 1969 writing many experimental pieces for both trained and untrained musicians for it including the popular Raindrops. In the same year, along with John White, Chris Hobbs and Alec Hill, he formed the Promenade Theatre Orchestra with its distinctive pioneering brand of English minimalism contributing many pieces for it, including Four Toy Pianos.

During the 1970s, Shrapnel taught music in secondary schools in South East London and Lambeth. From the mid '70s through the '80s, Shrapnel played oboe in the folk/rock group Peoples' Liberation Music (later becoming the Progressive Cultural Association (PCA) Band) together with Cornelius Cardew, Laurie Baker, Dave Smith, Vicky Silva and others. Along with other members of the band, Shrapnel wrote songs in support of the workers struggles of the time including the 1984 miners’ strike.

In the '90s, he formed musical partnerships with pianist and BBC Radio 3 presenter Sarah Walker and composer/pianist Robert Coleridge, putting on many concerts at the British Institute of Contemporary Music in London and art galleries in South East London. In 1994, Shrapnel became Composer in Residence at Musicworks, a community music project in Brixton, South London, composing beginner's pieces for guitar and percussion workshops.

Since 2000, Shrapnel has written many wind ensemble works for the London New Wind Festival concerts and works for Cornelius Cardew Concerts Trust concerts at Morley College in London, including works for two pianos for the Ivory Piano Duo Ensemble, string quartets and piano quintets for the Ligeti and De Madrugada quartets including Easter Rising and The Hazelnut. In 2012, Shrapnel formed a piano duo with the composer and pianist John Lewis (b. 1947) composing Tales of South East London, featured on their album Elements of London. In recent years, the Ivory Piano Duo Ensemble has performed and recorded many of Shrapnel's piano works.

== Bibliography ==
Nyman, Michael (1972). Experimental Music - Cage and Beyond. Cambridge University Press

== Compositions ==
=== Piano ===
- Cantation I (1970)
- Lullaby (1970)
- East End (for piano duet) (1981)
- Scenario (for piano duet) (1983)
- Autumn Pieces (1989)
- Cat Preludes (1994)
- South of the River (for piano duet) (1994)
- 1st Piano Set (1999)
- Coronal (2003)
- Sphinxes (after Schumann) (2004)
- Sonatine (2004)
- Love-Hate (2007)
- Temps Perdues (2010)
- First Light (2014)
- Alternative Worlds (for two pianos) (2015)
- Square Blues (for piano duet) (2015)
- Follow Me Up to Carlow (for two pianos) (2016)
- Winter songs (2016)
- West End (for piano duet) (2016)
- Tales of South East London (for piano duet) (2017)
- Valses mécaniques (2018)
- In 3 (2018)
- For Bob (2019)
- Aftermath (2019)
- Piano Set #2 (2019)
- Crooked pieces (2020)

=== Instrumental ===
- Two Pieces (1984) - clarinet and piano
- After 4 Years (1991) - solo vibraphone
- Unity (1991) - flute and piano
- Ouagadougou (1992) - trombone and percussion
- Byways (1997) - bass clarinet and cello
- West Pier (1997) - euphonium and two electric keyboards
- 4 Love Sonnets of a Building Worker (1999) - violin and piano
- Belladonna (2004) - flute and piano
- Sonatine (2006) - flute and piano
- Loose Connections (2011) - solo tuba
- Coalition Blues (2011) - alto trombone and piano
- For James Allen (2014) - solo viola
- Sonatine for horn and piano (2016)
- Clarinet sonata (2020) - clarinet and piano
- Thank you NHS (2021) - solo violin

=== Chamber ===
- Triamena (1992) - flute, viola and vibraphone
- For Cornelius (1992) - flute, viola, vibraphone and piano
- Suite for Recorders (1993) - eight recorders (two soprano, two descant, two treble and two tenor), tambourine and two small drums
- Beelzebub's Barrel Organ (2002) - saxophone quartet
- Objets Inutiles (2006) - oboe, clarinet, horn and trombone
- May (2008) - string quartet
- Inconsequences (2008) - oboe, bass clarinet, trombone and percussion
- String Trio (2011)
- Hilly Fields (2013) - wind quintet
- Trio (2015) - flute, violin and piano
- Easter Rising 1916 (2016) - string quartet and fiddle
- Nascence (2017) - string quartet and piano duet
- The Hazelnut (2018) - piano quintet
- 7 Dances for Bob (2019) - clarinet and bass clarinet
- Crossover blues (2019) - four bass clarinets
- Idée fixe (2023) - four bass clarinets
- One day (2023) - trumpet, cello, accordion, piano and percussion

=== Experimental ===
- Chorale (1970) - two to four reed (or electric) organs
- Bells (1970) - any number/kind of tuned metal percussion, pianos, harps and zithers
- Raindrops (1970) - any number/kind of tuned and untuned percussion, guitars and other plucked strings
- 4 Toy Pianos (1971)
- Steps (1971) - four keyboards
- Carolina Moon (1971) - two toy pianos (or digital keyboards) and two reed (or electric) organs
- Chamber Music in 6 parts (1972) - three to ten melody instruments
- Prose Collection (1972) - various
- Woodlands Collection (2001) - two Casio CTK-650 keyboards and one Roland EP-9e keyboard
- Verbal Pieces (2008, 2009, 2017, 2024)

=== Orchestral ===
- South of the River (1994, orch. 2024) - single wind and brass, harp, celeste and strings
- Chachapoyas (2008) - flute, piccolo, B flat clarinet, E flat clarinet, bass clarinet, vibraphone, piano, percussion and strings
- Creekside (2013, orch. 2024) - single wind, horn, trumpet, timpani, harp, celeste and strings
- Eine Kleine Streichmusik (2018) - string orchestra

=== Vocal ===
- What is a Miner? (1984) - solo voice, oboe (or trumpet) and piano
- That April Day (1987) - solo soprano and chorus (SSAATB)
- Three Philip Larkin songs (1988) - contralto (or baritone) and piano
- thr(ee) cummings songs (1992) - soprano and viola
- 2 Robert Burns Sonnets (1996, 2022) - choir (SATB)
- 3 Poems of Edward Thomas (1998) - baritone and piano
- 3 Robert Burns songs (1998) - baritone and piano
- Love Sonnets of a Building Worker (2000) - tenor and piano
- Peace (2001) - soprano, soprano saxophone, banjo, bongos and piano
- 3 Songs from Africa (2002) - contralto and vibraphone (or piano)
- Not In Our Name (2002) - contralto, baritone, flute and piano
- Tomorrow's Seed (2011) - flute, oboe, clarinet, violin, cello, soprano saxophone and voice
- plant magic dust (2015) - soprano and clarinet
- things without name (2020) - soprano and piano

=== Amateur/Children ===
- Raindrops (1970) - free instrumentation
- Beginners Pieces for Guitars (1993)
- Duck & co. (2014)
- Good Morning (2021) - solo piano
- Seascape (2021) - solo piano

=== Arrangements ===
- 5th Brigade (Republican song - Spanish Civil War) (2011) - voice and string trio
- Comintern Song (by Hans Eisler) (2017) - voice, violin and piano
- October (based on themes from Shostakovich's 12th Symphony) (2017) - violin and piano

== Discography ==
Year	Title	Artists	Label
1998	South of the River & Cat Preludes	Sarah Walker and Robert Coleridge (piano); Francesca Hanley (flute); Hugh Shrapnel (piano).	CD Musicnow mncdx02
2002	Promenade Theatre Orchestra at the Orangerie (1 October 1972)	Promenade Theatre Orchestra	Experimental Music Catalogue EMC 102
2020	Elements Of London	Ivory Duo Piano Ensemble	Convivium Records CR055
2023	Hugh Shrapnel: Piano Works	Ivory Duo Piano Ensemble	Convivium Records CR087
2025	Hugh Shrapnel: Chamber Works	Camarilla Ensemble	Convivium Records CVI097

== Publishers ==
- Experimental Music Catalogue - www.experimentalmusic.co.uk
- Scodo (Universal Edition) -
- Alea Music - www.bassclarinet.ecwid.com
