= Clog Dance =

Clog Dance may refer to:

- Clog dance, performed whilst wearing clogs
- Clog Dance (song), by Violinski, 1979
- Clog Dance: The Very Best of Violinski, a 2007 album by Violinski
- Clog Dance, from the ballet La fille mal gardée by Ferdinand Hérold

== See also ==
- Clog (disambiguation)
