= List of compositions by Howard Skempton =

This is a list of compositions by Howard Skempton. As of February 2008 there exists no complete catalogue of Skempton's work; for this reason the list may be incomplete. Compositions are arranged chronologically by year of composition, but within each year they are not necessarily listed in the order they were composed.

== List of works by genre ==
=== Orchestral works ===
- May Pole (open score) (1971)
- Chorales (1980)
- Chorales 2 (1987)
- Lento (1990)
- The Light Fantastic, for chamber orchestra (1991)
- Concerto for Hurdy-Gurdy and Percussion (1994)
- Ballade, for saxophone quartet and string orchestra (1997)
- Concerto for Oboe, Accordion and Strings (1997)
- Concertante, for solo violin and strings (1998)
- Prelude (1999)
- Sarabande (2002)
- Only the Sound Remains for viola and chamber ensemble (2010)
- Piano Concerto (2015)

=== Chamber music ===
- African Melody, for cello (1969)
- North Wind, for soprano saxophone (1970)
- Prelude, for horn (1971)
- Bends, for cello (1973)
- Surface Tension, for flute, cello and piano (1975)
- Surface Tension 2, for flute, cello and piano (1975)
- Prelude, for flute and string trio (1975)
- Impromptu, for 2 baritone horns (1976)
- Autumn Waltz, for 2 baritone horns (1976)
- Hornplay, for 2 baritone homs (1976)
- Children's Dance, for accordion and piano (1977)
- Tuba da caccia, for tuba (1978)
- Intermezzo, for viola and horn (1978)
- Melody for a First Christmas, for flute (1979)
- Melody, for horn (1979)
- Scherzo, for 2 horns (1979)
- Trio, for 3 horns (1979)
- Breather, for cello (1981)
- Prelude, for violin (1982)
- Call, for clarinet (1983)
- Wedding Tune, for violin and autoharp (1983)
- Lullaby, for clarinet and cello (1983)
- A Card for Lucy, for clarinet (1984)
- May Air, for bassoon (1984)
- Fanfare and Caprice, for guitar (1984)
- Lyric, for cello and piano (1984)
- Bagatelle, for flute (1985)
- Alone and Together, for clarinet, bassoon and piano
- Song without Words, for horn and accordion (1985)
- Pineapple Melody, for horn, accordion and double bass (1985)
- Two Interludes, for accordion and vibraphone (1986)
- Finding Home, for clarinet, cello, glockenspiel and piano (1986)
- Two Preludes, for string orchestra (1986)
- Suite for Strings, for string orchestra or string quintet (1986)
- Solo and duet, for violin and piano (1987)
- Aria, for string quartet (1987)
- Lament and Farewell, for oboe, cello and piano (1988)
- Prelude 2, for violin (1989)
- Axis 90, for flute and piano (1990)
- Half Moon, for flute and accordion (1990)
- The Beauty of the Morning, for peking, aaron and gendèr (gamelan) (1990)
- Moto perpetuo, for viola (1993)
- Three Pieces, for oboe (1993)
- Gemini Dances, for flute, clarinet, violin, cello, percussion, and piano (1994)
- Nature's Fire, for organ (1994)
- Chamber Concerto, for chamber orchestra (1995)
- Spadesbourne Suite, for violin, viola, cello, double bass, and piano (1995)
- Lullaby, for clarinet and cello (1995)
- Winter Sunrise, for string trio (1996)
- Clarinet Quintet, for clarinet and string quartet (1997)
- Six Figures, for cello (1998)
- Five Preludes, for guitar (1999)
- Delicate, ballet for 2 cellos and percussion (1996)
  - Suite from Delicate, for 2 cellos and percussion (1999)
- Five Nocturnes, for solo guitar, 2 clarinets, viola, cello, double bass (2000)
- Par la bande, for lute (2000)
- Garland, for oboe and string trio (2000)
- Rest and Recreation, for 2 euphoniums and 2 tubas (2000)
- Reminiscence, for guitar (2001)
- Catch, for string quartet (2001)
- Horizons, for oboe and harp (2001)
- Beguine, for guitar (2002)
- Off Limits, for tenor saxophone (2002)
- Three Pieces for Guitar, for guitar (2003)
- Eternity's Sunrise, for flute, clarinet in A, harp and string quartet (2003)
- Gleams and Fragments, for oboe, clarinet, viola and harp (2003)
- Random Girl, for oboe and vibraphone (2003)
- Tendrils, for string quartet (2004)
- Ben Somewhen, for flute, clarinet, harp, violin, viola, 2 cellos and double bass (2005)
- In Tandem, for piano and vibraphone (2010)

==== Works for percussion ====
- Drum No. 1 (open score) (1969)
- Equal Measures, for 2 drums (1974)
- Drum Canon, for 2 drums (1974)
- Two Drum Trios (1975)
- Duet, for piano and woodblocks (1976)
- Drum Canon 2, for 2 drums (1976)
- Acacia, for 2 drums (1976)
- Break, for 2 drums (1980)
- Fabric, for 2 drums (1980)
- Preamble, for 2 drums (1980)
- Agreement, for 2 drums (1985)
- Shiftwork, for percussion quartet (1994)
- Slip-stream, for glockenspiel, vibraphone, and 3 suspended cymbals (2002)

=== Works for piano solo ===
- A Humming Song (1967)
- Snowpiece (1968)
- September Song (1968)
- Piano Piece 1969 (1969)
- Waltz (1970)
- Two Highland Dances (1970)
- First Prelude (1971)
- One for Molly (1972)
- Quavers (1972)
- Simple Piano Piece (1972)
- Intermezzo (1973)
- Sweet Chariot (1973)
- Riding the Thermals (1973)
- Eirenicon (1973)
- Rumba (1973)
- Slow Waltz (1973), three hands
- One for Martha (1974)
- Quavers 2 (1974)
- senza licenza (1974)
- Invention (1974)
- Tender Melody (1974)
- Second Gentle Melody (1975)
- Colonnade (1975)
- Quavers 3 (1975)
- passing fancy (1975)
- Chorale (1976)
- Surface Tension 3 (1976)
- June '77 (1977)
- Eirenicon 2 (1977)
- Saltaire Melody (1977)
- Eirenicon 3 (1978)
- Postlude (1978)
- Memento (1978)
- Friday's Child (1979)
- Air (1979)
- Trace (1980), right hand
- Campanella (1981)
- Outline (1981), three hands
- Campanella 2 (1982)
- Well, Well, Cornelius (1982)
- Seascape (1982)
- Campanella 3 (1982)
- Beginner (1983)
- Quavers 5 (1984)
- The Durham Strike (1985)
- Piano Piece for Trevor Clarke (1985)
- Campanella 4 (1985)
- Eirenicon 4 (1985)
- The Mold Riots (1986)
- Resolution (1986)
- Toccata (1987)
- Pendulum 2 (1988)
- Study (1988)
- Even Tenor (1988)
- una barcarola eccentrica (1989)
- Images (1989), 20 pieces
- No Great Shakes (1989), piano duet
- after-image (1990)
- after-image 2 (1990)
- after-image 3 (1990)
- Maestoso (1990)
- A Perugia (1991)
- A Roma (1992)
- Of Late (1992)
- Swedish Caprice (1993)
- Ring in the Valiant (1993)
- Plain Sailing (1993), piano duet
- 3 Nocturnes (1995)
- Cantilena (1995)
- Album Leaf (1995)
- Horham (1994)
- Lyric Study (1995)
- Familiar (1995)
- Decision Time (1995)
- Guitar Caprice (1984/95)
- Starlight (1996)
- Memorial Prelude (1996)
- Zwischenspiel (1996)
- Monogram (1997)
- Penumbra (1997)
- Bolt from the Blue (1997)
- Gestalt (1997)
- Leamington Spa (1997)
- Arpeggio (1997)
- Octaves (1998)
- Goldsmiths (1997)
- Ecossaise (1998)
- Two Pinter Poems (1998)
- Rameau Variation (1999)
- Scorrevole (1999)
- Reflections 1-11 (1999–2002)
- Eighteen Golden Bars for Julian (2000)
- Shadows (2000)
- Liebeslied (2001)
- Resister (2002)
- Acacia (2003)
- Stroking the keys (2003)
- Lull (2003)
- Potter's Bar (2003)
- The Flicker of your Smile (2004)
- For Catherine (2004)
- Sphinx (2004)
- Little Barcarolle (2004)
- Mickey Finn (2005)
- A Beached Whale of a Time (2007)
- Notti stellate a Vagli (2008)
- Lullaby for Emilian (2009)
- Force to be reckoned with (2010)
- Gralsstimmung (2010)
- Aside (2013)
- Homage to Hanns Eisler (2014)
- Oculus (2014)
- Spring Song (2015; toy piano)
- Solitary Highland Song (2017)
- 24 Preludes and Fugues (2019)

=== Works for accordion solo ===
- Gentle Melody (1974)
- Deeply Shaded (1975)
- Summer Waltz (1975)
- Ada's Dance (1975)
- One for the Road (1976)
- Merry-go-round (1978)
- Pendulum (1978)
- Summer Sketches (1978)
- Suite (1982)
- Breathing Space (1983)
- Twin Set and Pearls (1984)
- Cakes and Ale (1984)
- Second Suite (1985)
- Third Suite (1985)
- Small Change (1985)
- Home and Abroad (1985)
- Something of an Occasion (1986)
- Axis (1986)
- Axis 2 (1986)
- Crane's Waltz (1991)
- Parsons' Waltz (1991)
- Adjö
- Hornpipe
- Hurdy–Gurdy
- Romance

=== Vocal works ===
==== Choral works ====
- Song at the Year's Turning, for four-part mixed chorus (1980)
- From Waterloo Bridge, for mixed chorus and 2 pianos (1986)
- Five Poems of Mary Webb, for three-part SSA female chorus (1989)
- Rose-berries, for three-part female chorus (1990)
- Roundels of the Year, for SATB chorus with divisions (1992)
- To Bethlem did they go, for SATB chorus (1995)
- We who with songs, for SATB chorus and organ (1995)
- Two Poems of Edward Thomas, for SATB chorus (1996)
  - Two Pewits
  - Sowing
- The Flight of Song, for SATB mixed ability voices (1996)
- He wishes for the cloths of Heaven, for SATB chorus (1999)
- The Voice of the Spirits, for SATB chorus (1999)
- Murallennium ('Spring all the Graces'), for SATB chorus and symphonic wind band (2000)
- The Song of Songs, for TTBB chorus (2000)
- The Bridge of Fire, for SATB chorus (2001)
- Four by the Clock, for SATB chorus (2001)
- Ostende nobis, Domine, for SATB chorus (2001)
- Rise up, my love, for SATB chorus (2002)
- Magnificat & Nunc Dimitis - The Edinburgh Service, for upper voices and organ (2003)
- Music, for SATB chorus (2003)
- That Music Always Round Me for SATB chorus and orchestra (2003)
- Four New Poems, for SA chorus and chamber ensemble or piano (2004)
- It was a star, for SATB chorus (2004)
- Into this world, this day did come, for SSA chorus (2006)
- The Wells Service, for SATB, unaccompanied (2011)

==== Solo voices ====
- Not-very-long Song, for voice and accordion (1972)
- Heart Sounds, for 2 voices (1974)
- Embers 2, for 2 voices (1974)
- Alice is One, for voice and piano (1982)
- Tree Sequence, for voice, piano and woodblocks (1976, 1981–1982):
  - From the Palm Trees
  - Willow
  - Laburnum
  - Mountain Ash
  - Duet (see the 1976 Duet for piano and woodblocks)
- Second Tree Sequence, for voice and piano (1983):
  - Tree, leafless
  - Under the Elder
  - Aspen Trees
- Pigs could Fly, for voice and piano (1983)
- The Gipsy Wife's Song, for mezzo-soprano soloist, flute, oboe, vibraphone and piano (1983)
- Two Voices, for male voices (1986)
- Close the coalhouse door, for voice? (1986)
- Ever Greener, for voice (1986)
- Three Poems of D. H. Lawrence, for soprano soloist and clarinet (1989)
- How Slow the Wind, for soprano soloist, 2 clarinets, viola, cello and bass (1989)
- The Maldive Shark, for baritone soloist and piano (1990)
- Colomen, for soprano soloist, clarinet and piano (1990)
- The Witches' Wood, for soprano soloist, flute, clarinet, violin, cello and piano (1990)
- Into my heart an air that kills, for soprano soloist, string quartet and piano (1996)
- Hot Noon in Malabar, for soprano soloist and piano trio (1997)
- Lamentations, for bass soloist and theorbo (2001)
- Emerson Songs, soprano soloist and baritone soloist (2003)
- And There was War in Heaven, for five solo voices ATTBB (2006)
- The Moon is Flashing, for tenor soloist and orchestra (2007)
- The Rime of the Ancient Mariner, for horn, piano, 5 strings and baritone soloist (2015)

=== Tape music ===
- Indian Summer (1969)
- Drum No. 3 (1971)

=== Works with unspecified instrumentation ===
- Lament (open score) (1972)
- Air Melody (open score) (1978)
- Highland Melody (open score) (1982)
- Recessional (open score) (1983)
- Christmas Melody (open score) (1983)
