= Brassed Off =

1996 British film by Mark Herman

- Theatrical release poster
- Directed by: Mark Herman
- Written by: Mark Herman
- Produced by: Steve Abbott
- Starring: Pete Postlethwaite; Tara Fitzgerald; Ewan McGregor; Jim Carter; Mary Healey; Melanie Hill; Philip Jackson; Sue Johnston; Peter Martin; Stephen Moore; Stephen Tompkinson
- Cinematography: Andy Collins
- Edited by: Michael Ellis
- Music by: Trevor Jones
- Production companies: Prominent Features; Channel Four Films; Miramax Films
- Distributed by: FilmFour Distributors
- Release date: 1 November 1996 (United Kingdom)
- Running time: 107 minutes
- Country: United Kingdom
- Language: English
- Budget: £2.8 million
- Box office: £3 million

Brassed Off is a 1996 British comedy-drama film written and directed by Mark Herman and starring Pete Postlethwaite, Tara Fitzgerald and Ewan McGregor.

The film is about the troubles faced by a colliery brass band, following the closure of their pit. The soundtrack for the film was provided by the Grimethorpe Colliery Band, and the plot is based on Grimethorpe's own struggles against pit closures. It has been generally very positively received for its role in promoting brass bands and their music. Parts of the film make reference to the huge increase in suicides that resulted from the end of the coal industry in Great Britain, and the struggle to retain hope in the circumstances.

== Context ==
The film is set ten years after the year-long strike in 1984–85 by the National Union of Mineworkers (Great Britain). Before the privatisation of British Coal, a wave of pit closures took place. Depleted of resources following the long strike, the miners were unable to continue a resistance against the policies of the government. Many had been in debt ever since the strike, and were prepared to take redundancy money whilst it was on offer.

The National Coal Board (NCB) arranged private ballots to determine between closing a pit immediately with compulsory redundancies or taking a pit to a review procedure to determine whether the pit should be privatised. Although miners had a tradition of fighting for their jobs, the risk of losing the redundancy money on offer by going forwards to privatisation swung the votes in most ballots to be in favour of pit closure and redundancy. The loss of hope, pride and fighting spirit in previously proud mining communities was the basis for the idea of being "brassed off", an expression used in the North of England meaning "angry".

Beginning in early 1993, groups of miners' wives camped outside some pits' gates and outside the Department of Trade and Industry in London. This is referred to in the film. It contrasts with the muted response from the mineworkers, some of whom sang Shut the pit! to the tune of the song Here We Go! from the 1984–85 strike.

== Plot ==
Gloria Mullins has been sent to her home town of Grimley to determine the profitability of the pit for the management of British Coal. She also plays the flugelhorn, and is allowed to play with the local brass band after playing Concierto de Aranjuez, affectionately known as “Orange Juice” by the characters, with them. The band is made up of miners from whom she must conceal her purpose. She renews a childhood romance with Andy Barrow, which soon leads to complications. Andy is bitter about the programme of pit closures and determined to fight on, but is also realistic about the circumstances and predicts a 4-to-1 majority for closure and redundancy.

When Andy realises Gloria is working for management, he accuses her of naïvety for thinking the Coal Board is even considering the pit's future and argues that the decision to close would have been made years earlier. It is later revealed, during a confrontation between Gloria and colliery management, that the decision was made two years prior and was to have proceeded regardless of her findings. The report was simply a PR exercise to placate the miners and sympathetic members of the public.

The passionate band conductor Danny Ormondroyd finds he's fighting a losing battle to keep the rest of the band committed. His son Phil is badly in debt and becomes a clown for children's parties, but this fails to prevent his wife and children leaving him. In debt, Phil votes for the redundancy money, which he becomes ashamed of. As Danny collapses in the street and is hospitalised, Phil suffers a mental breakdown while entertaining a group of children as part of a harvest festival in a church. He refers to himself as "Coco the scab"—a name he was called by a debt collector whom he had asked to wait until the redundancy money came through. Eventually, Phil tries to hang himself but is taken to the hospital. Phil reveals to Danny that in light of the colliery's closure, the band has decided not to continue playing.

When band member Jim realises Gloria is working for management, he is unimpressed with Andy's relationship with her. In a pub conversation, the other miners are not particularly concerned and feel Jim is being too harsh. When Andy says he should be old enough to make his own decisions, Jim responds with, "Old enough to be a scab, then?" The pub falls silent, as the word was an extremely serious insult in a mining community and implies treachery to the working class. Jim then withdraws the insult and says that Andy is just "stupid". Later, Jim asks Gloria to leave the band and mocks her attempts to fund the band's trip to the National Finals.

Intending it to be their last performance, the band, in full uniform and wearing their miners' helmets and lamps, plays Danny Boy (the famous Percy Grainger arrangement of Londonderry Air) late at night outside the hospital where Danny has been hospitalised with breathing difficulties related to mining. Andy, having lost his tenor horn in a bet, whistles along with his hands in his pockets. After they finish, they all switch off their lamps.

Whilst the band is playing in the National Semi-Finals, the outcome of the ballot is announced as 4-to-1 in favour of redundancy, as Andy had predicted.

After Gloria sets up a bank account to fund travel to the National Finals, the band is brought back together to compete. Andy wins his tenor horn back in a game of pool. The band forgives Gloria when she gives them her earnings from compiling the report (rejecting it because it's "dirty money") and travels to the final at the Royal Albert Hall in London (Birmingham Town Hall was used to film these scenes), where they are amused by the inability of the woman on the dressing room's PA system to pronounce 'colliery'.

Before departing, Phil leaves a note for Danny saying they are going to the finals. Danny arrives just in time to see the band win the competition with a stirring rendition of the William Tell Overture finale, during which Phil notices his wife and children in the audience. Danny refuses to accept the trophy; he states that only human beings matter and not music or the trophy. He continues, "This bloody government has systematically destroyed an entire industry. Our industry. And not just our industry—our communities, our homes, our lives. All in the name of 'progress'. And for a few lousy bob."

However, following this gesture, Jim takes the trophy anyway. The band celebrates their victory as Andy and Gloria kiss on the upper deck of an open-topped bus travelling through London, while Danny leads the band in the trio from Elgar's Pomp and Circumstance March No. 1, better known as Land of Hope and Glory.

== Cast ==
- Ewan McGregor as Andy Barrow, the band's tenor horn player
- Pete Postlethwaite as Danny Ormondroyd, the band's conductor
- Tara Fitzgerald as Gloria Mullins, the band's flugelhorn player
- Stephen Tompkinson as Phil Ormondroyd, the band's trombone player
- Jim Carter as Harry, the band's euphonium player
- Philip Jackson as Jim, one of the band's tuba players
- Peter Martin as Ernie, one of the band's tuba players
- Melanie Hill as Sandra Ormondroyd
- Lill Roughley as Rita
- Sue Johnston as Vera
- Mary Healey as Ida
- Stephen Moore as McKenzie, the colliery manager
- Peter Gunn as Simmo
- Bernard Wrigley as Chapman
- Katherine Dow Blyton as Nurse
- Sally Ann Matthews as Waitress

== Production ==
The film is set in "Grimley" in the mid-1990s, which is a thin veil for Grimethorpe, a mining village in South Yorkshire which had been named as the poorest village in the UK in 1994 by the European Union. The nearby areas of the Dearne Valley and the Hemsworth area were also identified as in need of serious aid.

The hospital scene, with Pete Postlethwaite in bed, was filmed at Doncaster College, not a hospital. The festival scene in Delph was filmed on Monday 23 October 1995.

The soundtrack for the film was recorded by the Grimethorpe Colliery Band, the story roughly reflects Grimethorpe Colliery Band's history, and the film was largely shot in Grimethorpe.

== Reception ==
On the review aggregator website Rotten Tomatoes, 80% of 49 critics' reviews are positive. The website's consensus reads: "Brassed Off combines inspiring drama with populist socioeconomics to create a film whose familiar outlines are filled in with genuine and surprisingly palpable emotion." Metacritic, which uses a weighted average, assigned the film a score of 60 out of 100, based on 19 critics, indicating "mixed or average" reviews.

The film was one of Film Four Distributors first major releases and opened on 203 screens in the UK with a gross of £466,058 in its opening weekend, finishing third at the UK box office behind Dragonheart and The Nutty Professor. It went on to gross £2,128,437 in the UK.

The film's reputation has grown considerably since its initial release. Brassed Off is ranked 85th on the BFI list of Top 100 British Films. A reevaluation in 2018 concluded, "Like Danny’s speech at the Royal Albert Hall, the film is honest, poignant and powerful. Twenty years on, its message is still all too relevant. And the music is bloody great, by the way."

== Soundtrack ==
The film score for Brassed Off includes a large number of pieces from the brass band repertoire, played by the Grimethorpe Colliery Band conducted by John Anderson, alongside an original score composed by Trevor Jones.

=== Track listing ===
| No. | Title | Music | Artist | Length |
|---|---|---|---|---|
| 1. | "Death or Glory" | Robert Browne Hall | Grimethorpe Colliery Band | 2:49 |
| 2. | "A Sad Old Day" | Trevor Jones | | 0:48 |
| 3. | "Floral Dance" | Katie Moss | Grimethorpe Colliery Band | 2:59 |
| 4. | "Aforementioned Essential Items" | Trevor Jones | | 0:32 |
| 5. | "En Aranjuez Con Tu Amor" (Flugelhorn solo: Paul Hughes) | Joaquín Rodrigo | Grimethorpe Colliery Band | 4:04 |
| 6. | "Years of Coal" | Trevor Jones | | 0:35 |
| 7. | "March of the Cobblers" | Bob Barrett & Edrich Siebert | Grimethorpe Colliery Band | 3:09 |
| 8. | "There's More Important Things in Life" | Trevor Jones | | 1:47 |
| 9. | "Cross of Honour" | William Rimmer | Grimethorpe Colliery Band | 2:14 |
| 10. | "Jerusalem" | Hubert Parry | Grimethorpe Colliery Band | 2:23 |
| 11. | "Florentiner March" | Julius Fučík | Grimethorpe Colliery Band | 4:47 |
| 12. | "Danny Boy (Londonderry Air)" | arranged Percy Grainger | Grimethorpe Colliery Band | 3:07 |
| 13. | "We'll Find a Way" | Trevor Jones | | 3:25 |
| 14. | "Clog Dance" | John Marcangelo | Grimethorpe Colliery Band | 2:40 |
| 15. | "Colonel Bogey" | Kenneth J. Alford | Grimethorpe Colliery Band | 3:15 |
| 16. | "All Things Bright and Beautiful" | William Henry Monk arranged Simon Kerwin | Grimethorpe Colliery Band | 2:04 |
| 17. | "William Tell Overture" (Cornet solo: Shaun Randall) | Gioachino Rossini arranged G.J. Grant | Grimethorpe Colliery Band | 3:23 |
| 18. | "Honest Decent Human Beings" | Trevor Jones | | 1:37 |
| 19. | "Pomp and Circumstance" | Edward Elgar arranged J. Ord Hume | Grimethorpe Colliery Band | 3:19 |
| Total length: | | | | 48:57 |

=== Certifications ===
| Region | Certification | Certified units/sales |
|---|---|---|
| Australia (ARIA) | Gold | 35,000^{^} |
^{^} Shipments figures based on certification alone.

== Stage adaptation ==
Paul Allen adapted Mark Herman's screenplay for the stage, the production premiering at the Crucible Theatre Sheffield on 17 March 1998, with music performed by the Grimethorpe Colliery Band. The play transferred to the Royal National Theatre in June before embarking on a UK tour. In 2014 a new UK tour was mounted by the Touring Consortium Theatre Company, coinciding with the thirtieth anniversary of the miners' strike.

== In popular culture ==
A sample of a monologue performed by the main character Danny (Pete Postlethwaite) is used in the opening of the song "Tubthumping", on the 1997 Chumbawamba album Tubthumper: "Truth is, I thought it mattered; I thought that music mattered. But does it bollocks! Not compared to how people matter".

== See also ==
- BFI Top 100 British films
- The Full Monty (1997)
- Billy Elliot (2000)
- Pride (2014)
