= Arpeggio (disambiguation) =

Arpeggio is a musical term.

Arpeggio may also refer to:

- "Arpeggio" (Björk song), a bonus track by Björk on the album Utopia
- Arpeggio (Sly Cooper), a character in the video game series Sly Cooper
- Arpeggio, a 1997 composition by Howard Skempton
- Arpeggio, a 1980s disco band produced by Simon Soussan
- Arpeggio, a 2011 album by Ed Alleyne-Johnson
- "Arpeggio", a theme song for the video game Judgment
- Étude Op. 10, No. 11 (Chopin), also known as Arpeggio
- Weird Fishes / Arpeggi, a track by English art rock band Radiohead on the album In Rainbows
