= Machine Music =

Studio album by John White and Gavin Bryars
- Released: 1978
- Label: Obscure
- Producer: Brian Eno

Machine Music is a 1978 album by John White and Gavin Bryars. It was the eighth release on Brian Eno's Obscure Records.

This release had the catalogue number Obscure OBS 8. In common with most of the releases on Obscure it was recorded at Basing Street Studios in London, produced by Brian Eno and engineered by Rhett Davies.

The Bryars' composition The Squirrel and the Ricketty Racketty Bridge features four guitarists, each playing two guitars simultaneously.

== Track listing and personnel ==
=== Side one ===
All compositions by John White

1. Autumn Countdown Machine - Tuba, Metronome, Percussion – John White, Double Bass – Sandra Hill, Double Bass, Percussion – Gavin Bryars, Bassoon, Percussion – Christopher Hobbs
2. Son Of Gothic Chord - Piano – Christopher Hobbs, John White
3. Jew's Harp Machine - Jew's Harp – Christopher Hobbs, Gavin Bryars, John White, Michael Nyman
4. Drinking And Hooting Machine - Percussion (Bottle) – Brian Eno, Christopher Hobbs, Gavin Bryars, John White, Susan Dorey

=== Side two ===
Composition by Gavin Bryars

1. The Squirrel And The Ricketty Racketty Bridge - Electric Guitar – Brian Eno, Fred Frith, Guitar – Gavin Bryars, Acoustic Guitar – Derek Bailey
