= Carole Finer =

English radio presenter and artist (1936–2020)

Carole Finer (7 August 1936, Hackney – 20 March 2020) was an English radio presenter, artist and art teacher. She was a founder member of the Scratch Orchestra.

== Biography ==
Finer studied fine art at Chelsea College of Arts; at Chelsea she appeared in the student film Food for a Blush (1959). Later she went on to work as a typographer and graphic designer. She taught typography at the London College of Printing. She taught the Foundation Course in Art and Design from 1978, together with Philippa Beale, becoming head in 1983, until it closed in 1990. She then moved to Camberwell College of Arts to teach graphic design.

She joined the Experimental Music Classes given by Cornelius Cardew in 1968 at the Morley adult education College, London. Then in 1969 she was a founder member of the Scratch Orchestra. In 2019, she took part in the 50th anniversary of the Scratch Orchestra celebration at Morley College.

She carried out field sound recordings on trips that she took to Egypt, Iceland, India, Mexico, Sri Lanka and Turkey.

After she retired she presented the 'Sound Out' programme on Resonance FM, a weekly programme featuring experimental, improvised and folk music, which ran from 2007 up to 2020. She learnt to play the 5-string banjo, playing Bluegrass music, English and Irish folk music.

Finer married Michael Chant in 1974 and lived in Battersea; they had two children. She died on 20 March 2020, from COVID-19-related pneumonia. A tribute concert was held at Morley College in 2022.

== Book ==
- Pictures and Sounds Alphabet Book (1963). Carole Finer. Philograph Publications; ISBN 9780853704881
