= Voice Piece for Soprano =

Vocal composition by Yoko Ono

Voice Piece for Soprano is a 1961 vocal composition by the Japanese artist and musician Yoko Ono.

== Work ==
The score for the piece consists of the word 'scream' with three options for screaming given to the performer; to scream 'against the wind', 'against the wall' and 'against the sky'.

The theorist G Douglas Barrett in his 2016 book After Sound: Toward a Critical Music described the repetition of the word 'against' in the score for Vocal Piece for Soprano as redoubling "the screams singularly confrontational, antagonistic, and contrarian quality".

== History ==
The piece was part of Ono's 2015 retrospective at the Museum of Modern Art in New York City. Ono performed the piece herself several times during the duration of the exhibition, and visitors were encouraged via an "instruction piece" to scream into an amplified microphone. The sound of visitors screaming could be heard throughout the atrium of the museum for the duration of the exhibition from July to November, with the screams being heard as high as the museum's fifth floor.

== Performances and Recordings ==
The piece was covered by Sonic Youth on their 1999 album, SYR4: Goodbye 20th Century and also by American band, Dinosaur Robot, for a 2020 EP called Grapefruit Slices.
