= Cause for Alarm =

Cause for Alarm may refer to:

- Cause for Alarm! (film), a 1951 film noir starring Loretta Young
- Cause for Alarm (album), a 1986 album by Agnostic Front
- Cause for Alarm (novel), a 1938 novel by Eric Ambler

== See also ==
- No Cause for Alarm, a 1979 album by Violinski
