= Clog Dance: The Very Best of Violinski =

Greatest hits album by Violinski
- Released: 28 May 2007 (UK only)
- Genre: Rock
- Label: Sanctuary
- Producer: Mik Kaminski, John Marcangelo, John Hodgson

Violinski chronology
Stop Cloning About (1980)	Clog Dance: The Very Best of Violinski (2007)

Professional ratings
Review scores
Source	Rating
AllMusic	3.5/5 stars

Clog Dance: The Very Best of Violinski is a compilation album by Violinski. It marked the first time a lot of Violinski's songs had appeared on CD, the reason being that their original master tapes had been missing for over 20 years and had only just been discovered in an unmarked London tape vault.

== Track listing ==
1. "Clog Dance" (Marcangelo)
  - From the album "No Cause for Alarm"
2. "Silent Love" (de Albuquerque)
  - From the album "Stop Cloning About"
3. "Captain Dandy" (Hodgson)
  - From the album "Stop Cloning About"
4. "Save Me" (Hodgson)
  - From the album "No Cause For Alarm"
5. "What's Your Game" (Marcangelo)
  - From the album "Stop Cloning About"
6. "Princess of Darkness" (Instrumental rough mix) (Marcangelo)
  - Previously unreleased early version of "Cow"
7. "Caped Crusader" (Hodgson)
  - From the album "No Cause For Alarm"
8. "Hide It" (Kaminski, de Albuquerque)
  - From the album "Stop Cloning About"
9. "I Don't Know (Mik's Song)" (Alternate take) (Kaminski)
  - Previously unreleased early version of "Time to Live"
10. "Clear Away" (Kaminski)
  - From the album "Stop Cloning About"
11. "Tango" (Instrumental rough mix) (Hodgson)
  - Previously unreleased early version of "(More Than A) Sudden Romance"
12. "Ruby Rhythms" (Alternate early mix) (Marcangelo)
  - Previously unreleased alternate version
13. "No Cause For Alarm" (Early version) (Marcangelo)
  - Previously unreleased early version
14. "Need Your Love" (Instrumental rough mix) (Hodgson)
  - Previously unreleased early instrumental version
15. "Rock Steady" (Hodgson)
  - Previously unreleased demo recording
16. "Scenario" (Alternate early mix) (Marcangelo)
  - Previously unreleased alternate version
17. "Borderlands" (Instrumental early version) (Marcangelo)
  - Previously unreleased
18. "Mirrored Mirror" (Hodgson)
  - From the album "Stop Cloning About"
19. "Home to Tea" (Alternate early mix) (de Albuquerque)
  - Previously unreleased alternate version
20. "Clog Dance" (Rock version) (Marcangelo)
  - Previously unreleased alternate take

== Personnel ==
- John Hodgson – Drums, percussion
- Mik Kaminski – Barcus Berry violin
- John Marcangelo - Piano, keyboards, percussion
- Baz Dunnery - Vocals, guitar
- Andy Brown - Vocals, bass guitar
- Mike de Albuquerque – Vocals, guitar, bass guitar
- Paul Mann - Vocals, bass guitar
- Ian Whitmore - Vocals (tracks 3, 10, 18)
- Bob Brady - Vocals (track 15)
