= Violinski =

Rock band in the United Kingdom (1977–1984)

- Origin: UK
- Genres: Rock, progressive rock
- Years active: 1977–1984
- Label: Jet
- Past members: Mik Kaminski; Mike de Albuquerque; Barry Dunnery; John Hodgson; Paul Mann; John Marcangelo; Iain Whitmore; Bob Brady; Rod Butler; Andy Brown; Ronnie Caryl

Violinski was a rock band formed in 1977 by Electric Light Orchestra violinist Mik Kaminski with former member Mike de Albuquerque on guitar and vocals. In March 1979 the band become a one-hit wonder with their instrumental "Clog Dance", which made Number 17 the UK Singles Chart.

== History ==
As well as Mik Kaminski on violins and Mike de Albuquerque on guitar and vocals, the band included Barry Dunnery (guitar, formerly with Necromandus), John Hodgson (drums), Paul Mann, John Marcangelo (keyboards) and Iain Whitmore (bass guitar and vocals, formerly with Starry Eyed and Laughing). At one point, former Wizzard member Bob Brady was lead vocalist, and Rod Butler, who played lead guitar for a while, also appeared on the BBC show, Top of the Pops. At the time Kaminski was still a member of the Electric Light Orchestra, who were then enjoying their greatest success. John Hodgson had been a member of Rick Wakeman's band, the English Rock Ensemble, performing on percussion. He appeared on The Myths and Legends of King Arthur and the Knights of the Round Table and Lisztomania albums. He toured with Wakeman to North and South America, Japan, Australia and New Zealand during the period 1974–1976.

The group had been formed out of The Camden Rats, a group consisting of Kaminski, Hodgson, Geoff Crampton and two singers, one of them named Verdie. Kaminski and Hodgson then contacted ex-Cow member Marcangelo. The band Cow was formed while Kaminski, Hodgson and Marcangelo were students at Leeds College of music 1968–1970. With Andy Brown (bass and vocals) and Dunnery (guitar) the first Violinski line-up was complete. The first recording session started on 14 December 1977. Recordings for their first album continued throughout 1978 with Brown and Dunnery being replaced by de Albuquerque and Mann. The latter was replaced for their second album by Whitmore.

They released two albums, No Cause for Alarm (1979), and Stop Cloning About (1980); and later featured on the Electric Light Orchestra's compilation album, Friends & Relatives.

In early 1979 Violinski made the UK Singles Chart, thus becoming a one hit wonder with their instrumental single, "Clog Dance", which made Number 17 in March. The track was written by Marcangelo. However, they almost had a second hit with their fourth single "Silent Love", which received airplay, but was not in shops due to an account problem with Jet Records. In 1984 and through to 1985, Violinski played some gigs with the British guitarist Ronnie Caryl.

Hodgson is now head of Boomba-Bomba Records, and a percussion teacher in Huddersfield, Yorkshire.

== Discography ==
=== Singles ===
- "Clog Dance" / "Time To Live" (1979) – UK No. 17
- "Save Me" / "Cricket Bloody Cricket" (1979)
- "Scenario" (aka "In The Distance") / "What's Your Game" (1980) – promo only
- "Silent Love" / "Captain Dandy" (1980)
- "Ruby Rhythms" / "Clear Away" (1980)

=== Albums ===
- No Cause for Alarm (1979) – UK No. 49
- Stop Cloning About (1980)
- Whirling Dervish (1982) – U.S. only – re-release of No Cause For Alarm

=== CDs ===
- Clog Dance: The Very Best of Violinski (2007) – including previously unreleased material
