= Clog Dance (song) =

Single by Violinski

from the album No Cause for Alarm
- B-side: "Time to Live"
- Released: 1979
- Recorded: 28 April – 12 December 1978
- Genre: Rock, pop
- Length: 3:06
- Label: Jet Records
- Songwriter: John Marcangelo
- Producer: Violinski

Violinski singles chronology
"Clog Dance" (1979)	"Save Me" (1980)

"Clog Dance" was the first single released by Violinski, and became their only charting single. It was written by band member John Marcangelo, inspired by a shop in his town called Brew's which sold clogs. It reached number 17 on the UK Singles Chart in 1979 and also became a big hit in the Netherlands.

Having become a favourite amongst various brass bands, the tune was also used in the 1996 film Brassed Off.

"Clog Dance" appeared on various compilation albums, including Friends & Relatives and Clog Dance: The Very Best of Violinski, the latter including an alternative 'rock' version.

The song is used as the theme tune for the Ministox racing formula on many of the UK's short oval car racing circuits, as well as the backing track for several games in the spoof Japanese game show Banzai.

In 2007, Clog Dance the Musical, by John Marcangelo, was performed at Whitehaven Civic Hall to commemorate the 60th anniversary of the William Pit disaster, and was repeated in 2017 for the 70th anniversary.

== Charts ==
Chart (1979)	Peak position
UK Singles (OCC)	17
