= Christopher Hobbs =

English composer

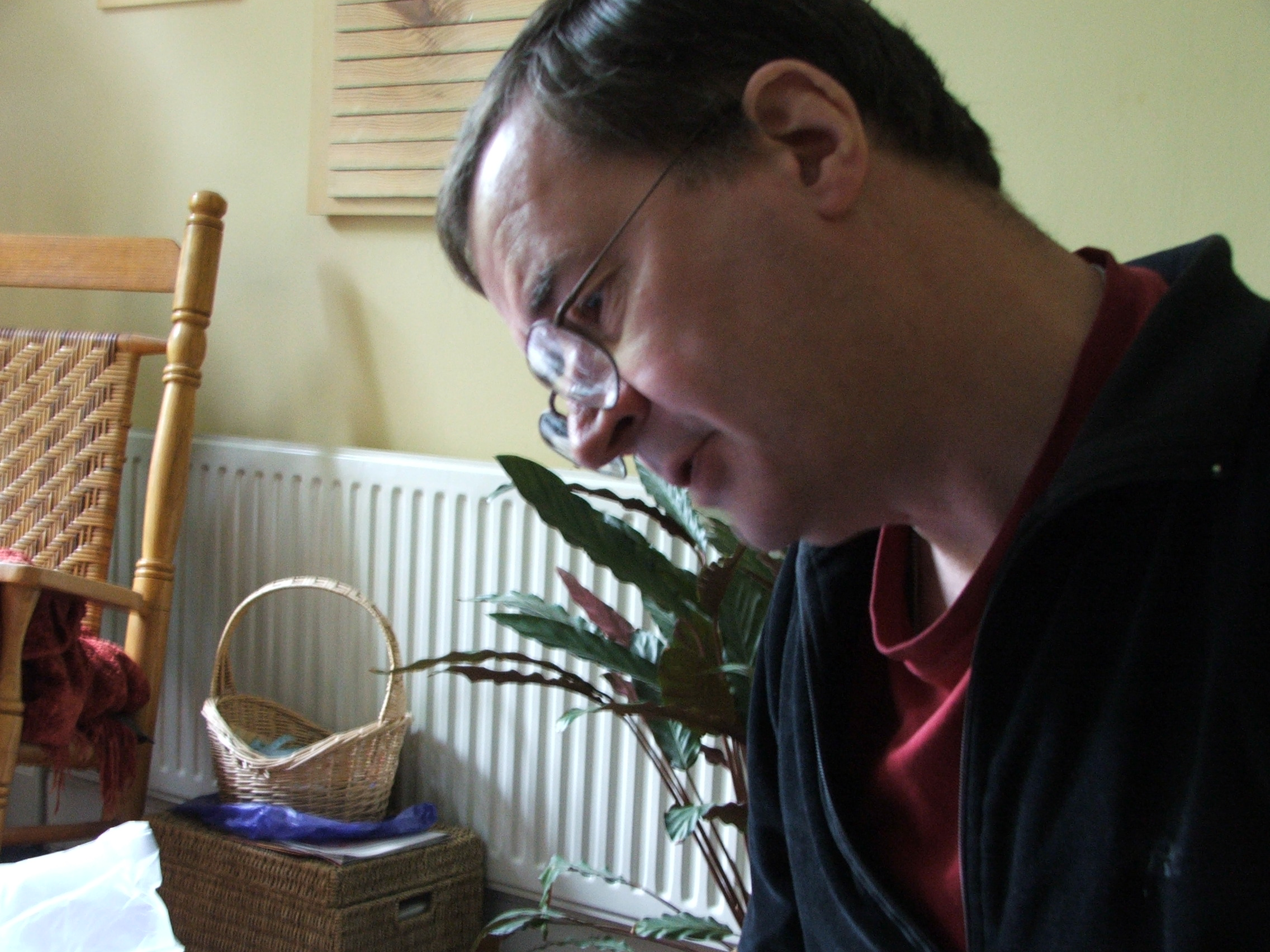
Christopher Hobbs

Christopher Hobbs (born 9 September 1950) is an English experimental composer, best known as a pioneer of British systems music.

== Life and career ==
Hobbs was born in Hillingdon, near London. He was a junior exhibitioner at Trinity College London, then was Cornelius Cardew's first student at the Royal Academy of Music from 1967. Hobbs worked with Cardew and Christian Wolff: he joined AMM, appearing on two albums: The Crypt and Laminal.

In 1969, Hobbs was a member from the first meeting of the Scratch Orchestra, and, as its youngest member, designed the Scratch Orchestra's first concert, at Hampstead Town Hall on 1 November 1969. His early composition Voicepiece, part of his Verbal Pieces group, was used often enough to be called a Popular Classic in the Scratch Orchestra nomenclature.

As experimental music was hard to come by, Hobbs gathered sheet music from friends and founded the Experimental Music Catalogue in 1968 as a distribution centre. Various pieces were eventually grouped into a series of Anthologies according to themes: the Verbal Anthology (of text-notation music), Keyboard, and Educational Anthologies are typical. These anthologies published works mainly by British experimentalists, but also works by Christian Wolff, Frederic Rzewski, Terry Jennings and other American experimentalists. After a few years, Hobbs was joined by Gavin Bryars and Michael Nyman in the operation of the catalogue, which lasted in its original form until the early 1980s. It was re-started in 2000 by Hobbs and Virginia Anderson and was active until Anderson's death in 2021.

Hobbs was a founder-member of the Promenade Theatre Orchestra (PTO), with John White, Alec Hill, and Hugh Shrapnel, a group of composer-performers that specialised in music for toy pianos and reed organs. On the breakup of the PTO (for political reasons, as Shrapnel and Hill wanted a greater political content in the works played and Hobbs and White did not), Hobbs and White formed the eponymous Hobbs-White Duo, which lasted until 1976. He also took part in several momentous one-off concerts, most notably in a complete performance of Erik Satie's Vexations with Bryars in Leicester.

Hobbs' musical output includes his Duchamp-influenced musical ready-mades, in which found materials are manipulated in some manner, such as The Remorseless Lamb (1970), in which sections of a two-piano arrangement of Bach's "Sheep may safely graze" are rearranged by random means. His best-known work of this time is probably Aran, in which the note-to-note system is taken from the knitting pattern for an Aran sweater. Hobbs and White moved to a freely-composed eclectic style (since White had been writing piano sonatas of great charm and brevity, Hobbs began writing piano sonatinas of great length and weight). In the 1980s, Hobbs wrote for the then-new Casio electronic keyboards, including the toy VL-Tone (in Back Seat Album of 1983) and the MT-750 (17 On-Minute Pieces for Bass Clarinet and Casio MT750). He also wrote for the Hartzell Hilton Band, of which he was founder member, and for other ensembles, including the Dublin Sinfonia.

Since the 1990s, Hobbs returned to systems composition, some with an emphasis on textual content, as in Extended Relationships and False Endings (1993; systemic manipulation of American soap-opera synopses) and No One Will Ever Have the Same Knowledge Again (1996; manipulation and setting of letters to the Mount Wilson Observatory). His Fifty in Two-Thousand (2000), a birthday celebration, uses partially prepared piano, electronic keyboard, and percussion in strict permutations, while maintaining a friendly, melodic soundworld. This combination of strict rigour and audience-friendly surface is typical of most of Hobbs' work since 1970, as is his use of cheap (toy or amateur) electronics. Hobbs has recently begun using Apple Computer's basic GarageBand software to write a series of pieces based on sudoku puzzles (which provide permutations of numbers and letters in a grid). This has led to a double album released in November 2006, called Sudoku Music (Experimental Music Catalogue, EMC 104, 2006). In 2009, a CD single of the twenty-minute Sudoku 82, realised first on GarageBand and transcribed for eight pianos (performed and multi-tracked by Bryan Pezzone), was released on Cold Blue Recordings (CB0033).

Hobbs was director of music at Drama Centre London from 1973 to 1991. He taught at Leicester Polytechnic (later De Montfort University) from 1985 to 2020. He was also associate senior lecturer in music at Coventry University from 2004 to 2022.
