= Roman Wall Blues =

Studio album by Alex Harvey
- Released: October 1969
- Recorded: 1969
- Studio: Philips (London, UK)
- Genre: Hard rock; R&B; soul-rock; folk-rock; rock & roll
- Length: 39:41
- Label: Fontana
- Producer: Brian Shepherd, Alex Harvey

Alex Harvey chronology
The Blues (1964)	Roman Wall Blues (1969)	The Joker is Wild (1972)

Singles from Roman Wall Blues
- 1. "Midnight Moses" Released: December 1969

Professional ratings
Review scores
Source	Rating
AllMusic	2.5/5 stars

Roman Wall Blues is the first solo album by Alex Harvey made after the Soul Band, and his time in the Hair pit band. This album was released in 1969 and contains one song from Hair ("Donna"), plus some Harvey originals, ("Midnight Moses", "Roman Wall Blues" and "Hammer Song"); that he later re-record with The Sensational Alex Harvey Band. The title track was a couplet sonnet by W.H. Auden about the life of a Roman soldier.

The album was recorded at Philips Studio, London.

== Track listings ==
All tracks composed by Alex Harvey, except where indicated.

1. "Midnight Moses" – 3:30
2. "Hello L.A., Bye Bye Birmingham" (Delaney Bramlett, Mac Davis) – 2:29
3. "Broken Hearted Fairytale" (Harvey, Andy McMaster) – 3:41
4. "Donna" (James Rado, Gerome Ragni, Galt MacDermot) – 2:21
5. "Roman Wall Blues" (W. H. Auden, Alex Harvey) – 2:50
6. "Jumping Jack Flash" (Mick Jagger, Keith Richards) – 3:14
7. "Hammer Song" – 3:12
8. "Let My Bluebird Sing" – 3:40
9. "Maxine" (A. Foray) – 4:40
10. "(Down at) Bart's Place" – 4:21
11. "Candy" – 2:57

== Personnel ==
=== Musicians ===
- Alex Harvey – guitar, vocals
- Leslie Harvey – guitar
- Mickey Keene – guitar
- Bud Parkes – trumpet
- Derek Watkins – trumpet
- Derek Wadsworth – trombone, brass arrangements
- Frank Ricotti – alto saxophone, percussion, brass arrangements
- Ashton Tootell – baritone saxophone, flute
- Laurie Baker – bass guitar, electronics/effects
- Maurice Cockerill – keyboard
- Pete Woolf – drums

=== Technical ===
- Brian Shepherd – producer
- David Voyde – engineer
- Robin Nicol – sleeve design
