= Treatise (music) =

Musical composition by Cornelius Cardew

- by Cornelius Cardew
- Page twenty-five of the score
- Composed: 1963-1967
- Published: 1967, The Gallery Upstairs Press, Buffalo, N. Y.
- Movements: 1
- Scoring: 193 page graphic score

Treatise is a musical composition by British composer Cornelius Cardew (1936–81).

== Summary ==
Written between 1963 and 1967, Treatise is a graphic musical score comprising 193 pages of lines, symbols, and various geometric or abstract shapes that largely eschew conventional musical notation. Implicit in the title is a reference to the philosophy of Ludwig Wittgenstein, which was of particular inspiration to Cardew in composing the work. The score is not accompanied by any explicit instructions to the performers in how to perform the work, or what sound-producing means are to be used. Although the bottom of each page has two five-line musical staves, this is apparently not meant to suggest piano or other keyboard instrument(s), only to indicate that the graphic elements are musical and not purely artistic in character.

Although the score allows for absolute interpretive freedom (no one interpretation will sound like another), the work is not normally played spontaneously, as Cardew had previously suggested that performers devise in advance their own rules and methods for interpreting and performing the work. There are, however, almost infinite possibilities for the interpretation of Treatise that fall within the implications of the piece and general principles of experimental music performance in the late 1960s, including presentation as visual art and map-reading.

The British composer Julian Anderson describes Treatise as "very suggestive musically...what's wrong with playing, say 10 pages of Treatise only using the white notes, or only using maybe the Dorian mode." The few available recordings, or more accurately, recordings of realisations of the score, all adopt a relative slow tempo and a sonic world, which "sounds like AMM".

Subsequently Cardew embraced Maoism and wholeheartedly repudiated this and other works of his avant-garde period. A savage indictment of Treatise may be seen in a speech delivered by Cardew at the ‘International Symposium on the Problematic of Today’s Musical Notation’ held in Rome in October 1972, as transcribed in his highly polemical book Stockhausen Serves Imperialism (1974). Cardew did not withdraw Treatise from publication, despite his repudiation. When speaking about his other composition, The Great Learning, Cardew did not remove that work from publication either. The reason, given by him in 'Criticism on The Great Learning' was that it displayed its class character and should be criticized wherever it is performed. It can be deduced that there was similar reasoning for Treatise not being removed from publication.

== In popular culture ==
Sonic Youth play a 3:29 minute excerpt of page 183 of Treatise on their album SYR4: Goodbye 20th Century (1999).
