= Howard Skempton =

English composer, pianist, and accordionist

- Born: Howard While Skempton; 31 October 1947 (age 78); Chester
- Education: Ealing Technical College
- Occupations: composer, pianist, accordionist
- Years active: before 1967 – present
- Known for: experimental music

Howard While Skempton (born 31 October 1947) is an English composer, pianist, and accordionist.

Since the late 1960s, when he helped to organise the Scratch Orchestra, he has been associated with the English school of experimental music. Skempton's work is characterised by stripped-down, essentials-only choice of materials, absence of formal development and a strong emphasis on melody. The musicologist Hermann-Christoph Müller has described Skempton's music as "the emancipation of the consonance".

== Life ==
Skempton was born in Chester and studied at Birkenhead School and Ealing Technical College. He started composing before 1967, but that year he moved to London and began taking private lessons in composition from Cornelius Cardew. In 1968 Skempton joined Cardew's experimental music class at Morley College, where in spring 1969 Cardew, Skempton and Michael Parsons organised the Scratch Orchestra. This ensemble, which had open membership, was dedicated to performing experimental contemporary music by composers such as La Monte Young, John Cage and Terry Riley, as well as by members of the orchestra itself. One of Skempton's early works, Drum No. 1 (1969), became one of the "most useful and satisfying" pieces in the repertory of the Scratch Orchestra.

Through the Scratch Orchestra Skempton met numerous composers and performers, including Christopher Hobbs, John White and various Systems artists, and the pianist John Tilbury. However, tensions arose during the politicising of the Scratch Orchestra in the early 1970s, when Cardew and a number of other important members pushed the ensemble in a Maoist direction. Skempton, Hobbs, Parsons, White and many others refused to be associated with this political line, and the break-up of the Orchestra was accompanied by (in Parsons's words) "a split between its 'political' and 'experimental' factions".

Since 1971 Skempton has been working as a music editor, performer (of his own compositions, on piano and accordion), and teacher. He now teaches composition at the Birmingham Conservatoire.

In 1974 Skempton and Michael Parsons formed a duo to perform their own works. The 1980s saw an increase of interest in Skempton's music, which led to more commissions and permitted him to compose more for larger forces. Lento, an orchestral work composed in late 1991, became one of Skempton's most widely recognised pieces. In the 1990s important recordings of his works started appearing, such as a disc of piano music recorded by his old friend and former Scratch Orchestra colleague John Tilbury, released on Sony Classical in 1996, and Surface Tension, a recording of miscellaneous works released on Mode Records.

Skempton was the winner in the Chamber Scale Composition category at the Royal Philharmonic Society Music Awards in 2005 for his string quartet Tendrils (2004).

== Works ==
Skempton's style is characterised by a concentration on quality of sound and economy of means, absence of development in the conventional sense, and concentration on sonority. Many of his pieces are quite short, lasting no longer than one or two minutes. Although the compositional methods are clearly experimental, involving, for example, aleatory methods, there is a marked emphasis on the melody in many pieces. Some of his earlier piano works, such as Saltaire Melody (1977) and Trace (1980), have become favourites with the public.

Formative influences on Skempton's music included the works of Erik Satie, John Cage and Morton Feldman. For example, A Humming Song (1967), an early piano piece composed before Skempton started lessons with Cardew, is a miniature with static, gentle sound. The harmonic structure consists of eight symmetrically arranged pitches, out of which six are selected for use in the piece. Chance procedures are then used to determine the order and number of occurrences of individual pitches. The pianist is asked to sustain certain pitches by humming. Another early piece, Drum No. 1 (1969), composed for the Scratch Orchestra, consists of just a few written instructions to the performers and is clearly inspired by similarly realised works by La Monte Young, whose music Cardew was enthusiastically propagating in the late 1960s. The score of May Pole (1971), a piece for orchestra, consists of a chance-determined sequence of chords. Each performer chooses a note from a chord, and chooses the moment when to play that note. The later the choice, the softer the dynamics. Skempton later called such pieces "landscapes" that "simply project the material as sound, without momentum." Other early works include two pieces for tape, a medium Skempton rarely used later: Indian Summer (1969) and Drum No. 3 (1971).

The early 1970s saw a slow shift from static, abstract pieces to pieces with more clearly defined rhythmic and harmonic structures, although the methods and forms Skempton used remained unorthodox. For instance, in the series of Quavers piano pieces (1973–75) the music consists solely of repeated chords with no pauses between them. In addition to "landscapes" two other categories appeared, dubbed "melodies" and "chorales" by the composer. The "melodies" are single melodic lines either with simple accompaniment (Saltaire Melody, for piano (1977)) or suspended in space (later works such as Trace for piano (1980) and Bagatelle for flute (1985)). "Chorales" are works where material is presented primarily (or solely) using chords. An example is Postlude (1978), for piano, in contradistinction to Eirenicon 3 (1978), also for piano, which is a "landscape". The earlier "melodies" were apparently composed at the instrument, intuitively, whereas the later ones evolve from a series of written pitches.

It was also in the 1970s that Skempton started composing chamber works, although these were almost always for two performers, since they were written to be performed by the duo of Skempton himself and Michael Parsons. These pieces included a number of horn duos, pieces for two drums, and a duet for piano and woodblocks. Finally, in the 1970s Skempton started playing accordion and composing for this instrument.

In 1980 Skempton composed Chorales, his first major work for orchestra. It was commissioned by the Merseyside Youth Orchestra. The composer described it as "essentially the same as what I was doing before, but on an orchestral scale". Although the work is clearly a "chorale" in the sense Postlude and similar pieces are, during the 1980s Skempton's range expanded greatly, leading to works such as The Durham Strike (1985), which is a set of piano variations that is longer than any of the previous piano pieces, Images (1989), a large cycle of piano works for a TV documentary, and chamber works scored for larger forces than those used previously.

Skempton's first major success came in 1991 with the premiere of Lento (1990), an orchestral piece that gained a larger audience for the composer. During the 1990s and the 2000s Skempton started composing longer works for larger forces. These include several concertos, among which are some for instruments rarely used in the western tradition: the hurdy-gurdy (Concerto for hurdy-gurdy and percussion (1994)) and the accordion (Concerto for oboe, accordion and strings (1997)). Some of the later works explore non-standard instrumentation: Alveston (2007) is scored for four trumpets, Horizons (2001) is scored for oboe and harp, Ballade (1997) is a piece for saxophone quartet and string orchestra.

== References and further reading ==
- Cavett, Esther and Matthew Head. 2019. Howard Skempton: Conversations and Reflections on Music. Boydell and Brewer.
- Hill, Peter. 1984. "Riding the Thermals: Howard Skempton's Piano Music". Tempo, new series, no. 148:8–11.
- MacDonald, Calum. 1996. "Skempton: Well, Well, Cornelius (and 43 other Piano Pieces). John Tilbury (pno). Sony SK 66482 / Sorabji: Gulistan. Charles Hopkins (pno). Altarus AIR-CD-9036 / Simpson: Piano Sonata; Variations and Finale on a Theme of Haydn; Michael Tippett, His Mystery; Variations and Finale on a Theme of Beethoven. Raymond Clarke (pno). Hyperion CDA66827 / Schnabel: Piano Piece in 7 Movements; Piano Sonata. Benedikt Kohlen (pno). Auvidis Montaigne M0782053". Tempo, new series, no. 197 (July): 47–49.
- March, Anton. 2026. "Familiarity and Interconnectivity: Formal Prototypes in the Larger-Scale Works of Howard Skempton". Tempo, no. 316 (April): 66–81.
- Müller, Hermann-Christoph. 1998. "Emanzipation der Konsonanz: Howard Skemptons Orchesterstück Lento". MusikTexte, no. 75 (August): 77–81.
- Pace, Ian. 1997. "Archetypal Experiments". The Musical Times 138, no. 1856 (October): 9–14.
- Parsons, Michael. 1980. "The Music of Howard Skempton". Contact, issue 21:12–16.
- Parsons, Michael. 1987. "Howard Skempton: Chorales, Landscapes and Melodies". Contact, issue 30:16–29.
- Potter, Keith. 1991. "Howard Skempton: Some Clues for a Post-Experimental 'Movement'". The Musical Times 132, no 1777 (March): 126–30.
- Potter, Keith (2001). "Skempton, Howard". In Sadie, Stanley; Tyrrell, John (eds.). The New Grove Dictionary of Music and Musicians (2nd ed.). London: Macmillan. ISBN 978-1-56159-239-5.
