= People's Liberation Music =

Political music group (1972-1978)

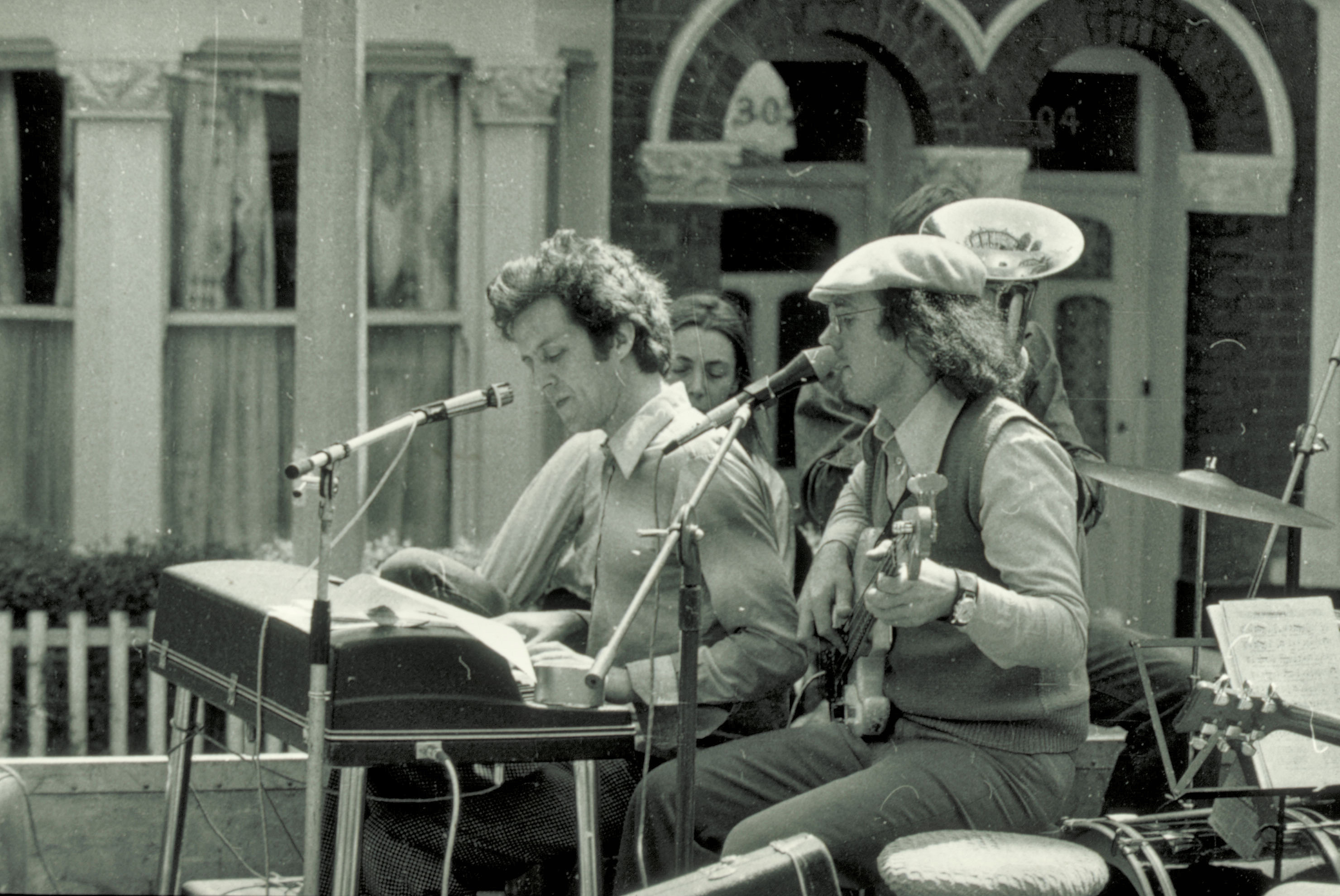
PLM at Grunwick march (1977)

The Peoples' Liberation Music (PLM) was a British political music group, playing folk and agit-pop, founded in 1972 by Laurie Scott Baker, John Marcangelo and John Tilbury. After Tilbury left in 1973 Cornelius Cardew and Keith Rowe joined with Vicky Silva as the main vocalist. Other members included Hugh Shrapnel, and Dave Smith; among its many drummers were Pip Pyle, John Mitchell, Tony Hicks and John Hewitt. After the group was dissolved in 1978 it was reformed as the band of the Progressive Cultural Association (PCA).

The album We Only Want The Earth (Musicnow – MNCDx004) was released in 2001.
