= John White (composer) =

English composer (1936–2024)

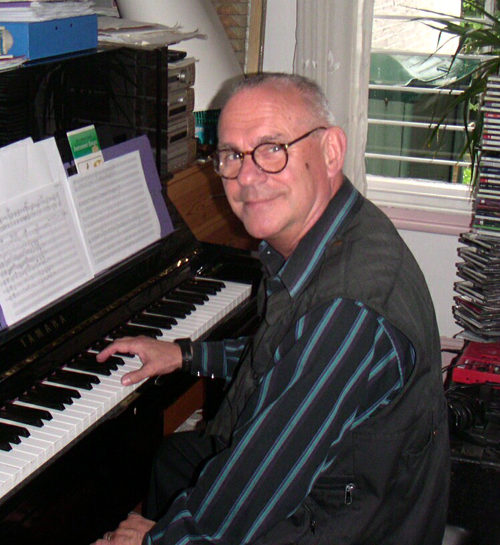
- Born: 5 April 1936; Berlin, Germany
- Died: 4 January 2024 (aged 87); London, England
- Occupations: Composer; Performer
- Known for: systems music

John White (5 April 1936 – 4 January 2024) was an English experimental composer and musical performer. He invented the early British form of minimalism known as systems music, with his early Machines.

== Life and career ==
John White was born in Berlin to an English father and German mother. The family moved to London at the outbreak of war. Originally a sculptor, White decided on a composition career when he heard Messiaen's Turangalîla-Symphonie. He studied composition at the Royal College of Music from 1955 to 1958 with Bernard Stevens and piano with Arthur Alexander and Eric Harrison. He also took analysis classes privately with Elisabeth Lutyens. Upon graduation, White became the musical director of the Western Theatre Ballet, and then professor of composition at the Royal College of Music from 1961 to 1967. He was a skilled pianist and tuba player and has written extensively for both instruments.

In the 1960s and 1970s he was closely associated with English experimental composers such as Cornelius Cardew and Gavin Bryars, and a participant in the Scratch Orchestra. His Royal College of Music pupils have included Roger Smalley, Brian Dennis and William York. White's association with younger composers, including Christopher Hobbs, Dave Smith, Benedict Mason, and John Lely has led to many British ensembles, including the Promenade Theatre Orchestra, Hobbs-White Duo, Garden Furniture Music, the Farewell Symphony Orchestra and other groups.

John White was the longest-serving faculty member at Drama Centre London, holding the position of head of music for four decades until March 2020. White's contribution as a musical educator and artistic mentor had a significant influence on the aesthetic outputs of multiple generations of British actors and directors.

White died on 4 January 2024, at the age of 87. A memorial service was held on 12 April 2024 at St Paul's, Covent Garden. Memorial concerts were held at the Round Chapel, Hackney, on the 14 April and at St Mary-at-Hill on 31 October 2025.

== Works ==
White's style was informed by what Dave Smith called an "apparently disparate collection of composers from the world of 'alternative' musical history", including Satie, Alkan, Schumann, Reger, Szymanowski, Busoni and Medtner. These composers influenced his piano sonatas, which White wrote from 1956 onward, but other influences on his wider work included Messiaen, Rachmaninoff, and the electronic pop ensembles Kraftwerk and the Residents. Although it is so eclectic as to cover a wide range of styles, White's work has been called ironic, "experimental", and even "avant postmodern".

Although White had worked in what could be called an 'experimental' style since 1962, he composed music using indeterminate means after 1966. His later work included music with numerical and other systems processes. Machine Music, a 1978 album with Gavin Bryars, is illustrative of White's concept of Machines: "a consistent process governing a series of musical actions within a particular sound-world".

In the 1980s - specifically following the ballet They are Not Like Us (1980, for Virginia Taylor's Kickstart company), which featured an electronically enhanced piano - White became interested in electronic music, often using "low-tech" toy instruments, such as Casio miniature keyboards. An example is Fashion Music (1993), performed by the Gemini Ensemble with clarinettist Ian Mitchell accompanied by the pre-set sounds of mass-market home electronic keyboards and "little machines".

As of 2019, White had written 180 piano sonatas, 25 symphonies, 30 ballets, and much incidental music for the stage, all in a highly eclectic style (or, more accurately, range of styles). His stage music includes commissions by the Royal Shakespeare Company and the Royal National Theatre. White wrote several scores for internal projects and public productions, including his final score for Drama Centre, Mother Courage and her Children (2015). Other projects include a set of song cycles, one of which consists of settings of friends' addresses.

=== Recordings ===
- Electric Music. ANTS AG22 (2020), includes 11th and 16th Symphonies.
- Fashion Music, London Hall DO3 (1993), Gemini Ensemble.
- Machine Music (John White/Gavin Bryers), Obscure OBS8 (1978).
- Music for Tubas: Killer Tuba Songs, Vol. 3, CD Baby (2017), Jay Rozen.
- Piano Sonatas Nos.1, 4, 5 and 9. Lyrita REAM 2108 (2008 re-issue of Lyrita RCS 18, 1965), Colin Kingsley.
- Piano Sonatas Nos. 15, 29, 31, 54, 55, 56, 57, 75, 76, 78, 86, 87, 95, 104, 108, 109, 121 & 124. NMC DO38 (1996), Roger Smalley.
- Piano Sonatas Vol. I (Adventures At The Keyboard: The Early Sonatas). Convivium CR006 (2007), Jonathan Powell.
- Piano Sonatas Vol. 2 (Later Sonatas). Convivium CR051 (2019), Jonathan Powell.

== See also ==
- Promenade Theatre Orchestra
- Systems music

== Sources ==
- Anderson, Virginia. 1991. "White, John". In Contemporary Composers. London: St. James Press.
- Anderson, Virginia. 1983. "British Experimental Music: Cornelius Cardew and his Contemporaries". M.A. thesis, Redlands, California: University of Redlands (Facsimile edition published 2000, Leicester: Experimental Music Catalogue; new edition forthcoming, as Experimental Music in Britain.)
- Smith, Dave, "Albus Liber: Exploits and Opinions of John White, Composer Volume I" (Journal of the London Institute of Pataphysics), Atlas Press, 2014. ISBN 9781900565240
