= No Cause for Alarm =

Studio album by Violinski
- Released: 1979
- Studio: De Lane Lea Studios, London; Marquee Studios, London; Musicland Studios, Munich
- Genre: Progressive rock
- Length: 33:08
- Label: Jet
- Producer: Mik Kaminski, John Marcangelo, John Hodgson

Violinski chronology
No Cause for Alarm (1979)	Stop Cloning About (1980)

Professional ratings
Review scores
Source	Rating
AllMusic	4.5/5 stars
Smash Hits	5/10

No Cause for Alarm was the first album released by Violinski. It became a minor hit on the albums chart, and it contained their only hit single—"Clog Dance", it reached number 17 on the UK singles chart. Another single from the album, "Save Me", failed to chart. The album was re-released in the US under the name Whirling Dervish in 1982. The cover photography was by Fin Costello.

== Track listing ==
Side one
No.	Title	Writer(s)	Length
1.	"Cricket, Bloody Cricket"	John Marcangelo	2:30
2.	"(More Than A) Sudden Romance"	John Hodgson	2:30
3.	"Rosanna"	Marcangelo	3:37
4.	"Need Your Love"	Hodgson	3:37
5.	"No Cause for Alarm"	Marcangelo	3:08
6.	"Clog Dance"	Marcangelo	3:02

Side two
No.	Title	Writer(s)	Length
7.	"Save Me"	Hodgson	3:56
8.	"Time to Live"	Mik Kaminski	3:03
9.	"Cow / Caped Crusader"	Hodgson	6:16
10.	"Die Aband Glocke"	Marcangelo	1:29
Total length:			33:08

== Personnel ==
According to the back cover.

Violinski

- Mike de Albuquerque, Baz Dunnery – guitar, vocals
- Paul Mann, Andy Brown – bass guitar, vocals
- Mik Kaminski – violin
- John Marcangelo – keyboards
- John Hodgson – drums, percussion

Additional personnel

- Jeff Calvert – engineer (Marquee Studios)
- Rafe McKenna – engineer (De Lane Lea Studios)
- Mack – engineer (Musicland Studios)
- Fin Costello – photography
- Martin Poole – art direction

== Charts ==
Chart (1979)	Peak position
UK Albums (OCC)	49
