= Images (Skempton) =

Images is a cycle of piano pieces composed by Howard Skempton in 1989. This work and a variations set, The Durham Strike, are the only large-scale piano works by Skempton, although he has been composing piano music since the beginning of his career.

The work was commissioned by Channel 4's HTV West for "Images", a six-part television series of documentaries dealing with various aspects of photography. The series was created to mark the 150th anniversary of the invention of photography. The producer, Barrie Gavin, wanted the music to be similar in concept to Erik Satie's Gymnopedies: in the words of the composer, the pieces were to be "like a sculpture viewed from different angles in a changing light." The pianist who performed Images for the TV series was Michael Finnissy.

Images comprises eight preludes, two "songs" (The Cockfight: a traditional song and Song 2), a set of variations, eight interludes and a postlude (Postlude: The Keel Row). In concert, the order of the pieces is not fixed and is left for the performer to determine. The eight preludes contain the pieces that directly correspond to Gavin's request. Preludes 1–3, all written on three staves and in 3/8 time, share identical rhythmic and melodic structure of all melodic lines, with just some of the notes and the key changed. Prelude 4 is also in 3/8 time and has a somewhat similar rhythmic structure, slightly simplified and written on two staves. The other four preludes form two pairs of such almost identical pieces. Preludes 5 and 6 are both in 7/16 time, and 7 and 8 are in 6/16.

The eight interludes were composed with specific scenes in mind and range from 18 to just 8 bars. Numbers 3, 5 and 8 employ free notation: there are no barlines, and the notes have no stems; note values are uniform throughout.
