= Lento (Skempton) =

1990 composition by Howard Skempton

Lento is a composition for orchestra written by Howard Skempton in 1990. It was Skempton's third work for large forces, and his first major success.

The piece was commissioned by the BBC Symphony Orchestra. Skempton was to write a piece to be performed between the Prelude from Richard Wagner's Parsifal and a Deryck Cooke completion of Gustav Mahler's Tenth Symphony. Skempton initially set out to compose three short pieces to be played in sequence, but afterwards decided on a single large piece. Lento was completed in November 1990; it was premiered on 12 March 1991 by the BBC Symphony Orchestra at the Barbican Centre concert hall, conducted by Mark Wigglesworth.

The work is scored for 3 flutes, 3 oboes, cor anglais, 3 clarinets, 3 bassoons, contrabassoon, 4 horns, 3 trumpets, 3 trombones, tuba, timpani, and strings. The instrumentation is the same as that of Wagner's Parsifal prelude, although Skempton's use of instruments is very different. Most of Lento is scored for strings alone, and although there's a central section scored for woodwinds, instruments other than strings are generally used to highlight various aspects of the music. The piece comprises 166 bars, but the single orchestral tutti occupies only eight. Timpani are used only twice, both times to produce a G trill.

Like much of Skempton's work, Lento uses precomposed chance arranged sequences of chords as the basic harmonic material. There are ten sections, and the melodic material is restricted for the most part to just two themes. The opening section presents the "first subject" and establishes the tonic key of G minor. This material is repeated three more times as sections 5, 7 and 10. The second section, which the composer refers to as the "lyrical second subject", is repeated only once as section 9. The tempo (quarter note = 52) is kept constant throughout the piece. Note values are restricted to mostly half notes and quarter notes.

The piece was very well received; a number of scholarly articles were written about it. Lento was described as "the emancipation of the consonance" by musicologist Hermann-Christoph Müller.
