= SYR4: Goodbye 20th Century =

1999 studio album by Sonic Youth

Studio album by Sonic Youth
- Released: November 16, 1999
- Recorded: March–August 1999, NYC
- Genres: Modern classical, harsh noise, experimental
- Length: 105:42
- Label: SYR
- Producers: Sonic Youth, William Winant, Jim O'Rourke

Sonic Youth chronology
Silver Session for Jason Knuth (1998)	SYR4: Goodbye 20th Century (1999)	NYC Ghosts & Flowers (2000)

SYR4: Goodbye 20th Century is an album by American alternative rock band Sonic Youth. It is a double album of versions of pieces by avant-garde composers, performed by Sonic Youth and collaborators.

== Background ==
SYR4 featured works by avant-garde classical composers such as John Cage, Yoko Ono, Steve Reich and Christian Wolff, played by Sonic Youth and several collaborators from the modern avant-garde music scene, such as Christian Marclay, William Winant, Wharton Tiers and Takehisa Kosugi.

Unlike other entries in the SYR series, SYR4's liner notes were written in English.

Thurston Moore and Kim Gordon's daughter Coco Hayley Moore, about 5 years old at the time of recording, provided the vocals for "Voice Piece for Soprano" on disc 1.

== Release ==
SYR4: Goodbye 20th Century was released on CD and vinyl. The vinyl version had a slightly different track order, due to the side length constraints of the format. The first disc of the CD edition contained a QuickTime video of a performance of "Piano Piece No. 13 (Carpenter's Piece)", which showed Sonic Youth nailing piano keys down one by one.

== Critical reception ==
Professional ratings
Review scores
Source	Rating
Allmusic	1.5/5 stars
Alternative Press	4/5 stars
Robert Christgau	(neither)
Entertainment Weekly	C+
NME	(7/10)
Pitchfork	(8.5/10)
The Rolling Stone Album Guide	2/5 stars
Spin	favorable
Sputnikmusic	3.5/5 stars

SYR: Goodbye 20th Century received mixed reviews from critics, but most praised the group's efforts at popularizing and reinterpreting the composers' works. The album placed second in The Wire's annual critics' poll for record of the year.

== Track listing ==
Disc one
No.	Title	Writer(s)	Performers	Length
1.	"Edges"	Christian Wolff	Wolff, Jim O'Rourke, Kim Gordon, Lee Ranaldo, Steve Shelley, Takehisa Kosugi, Thurston Moore, William Winant	16:03
2.	"Six (3rd Take)"	John Cage	O'Rourke, Ranaldo, Shelley, Kosugi, Moore, Winant	3:03
3.	"Six for New Time (For Sonic Youth)"	Pauline Oliveros	O'Rourke, Gordon, Ranaldo, Shelley, Moore, Winant	8:06
4.	"+–"	Takehisa Kosugi	O'Rourke, Gordon, Ranaldo, Shelley, Kosugi, Moore, Winant	7:01
5.	"Voice Piece for Soprano"	Yoko Ono	Coco Hayley Moore	0:17
6.	"Pendulum Music"	Steve Reich	Gordon, Ranaldo, Shelley, Moore	5:55

Disc two
No.	Title	Writer(s)		Length
1.	"Having Never Written a Note for Percussion"	James Tenney	O'Rourke, Gordon, Ranaldo, Shelley, Kosugi, Moore, Winant	9:09
2.	"Six (4th Take)"	Cage	O'Rourke, Ranaldo, Shelley, Kosugi, Moore, Winant	2:10
3.	"Burdocks"	Wolff	Christian Marclay, Wolff, O'Rourke, Gordon, Ranaldo, Shelley, Kosugi, Moore, Winant	13:12
4.	"Four^{6}"	Cage	O'Rourke, Gordon, Ranaldo, Shelley, Kosugi, Moore, Winant, Wharton Tiers	30:01
5.	"Piano Piece No. 13 (Carpenter's Piece) (For Nam June Paik)"	George Maciunas	Gordon, Ranaldo, Shelley, Moore	3:58
6.	"Pièce enfantine"	Nicolas Slonimsky	Ranaldo, Winant	1:28
7.	"Treatise (Page 183)"	Cornelius Cardew	O'Rourke, Gordon, Ranaldo, Shelley, Kosugi, Moore, Winant	3:25

== Personnel ==
Sonic Youth

- Thurston Moore – vocals, guitar, production
- Kim Gordon – vocals, guitar, bass, production
- Lee Ranaldo – vocals, guitar, production
- Steve Shelley – drums, percussion, production

Additional personnel

- Jim O'Rourke – bass, production
- William Winant – percussion, production
- Takehisa Kosugi – violin
- Christian Wolff – keyboards
- Christian Marclay – turntables
- Coco Hayley Moore – vocals

Technical

- Wharton Tiers – recording
- Luc Suer – recording
- Steve Fallone – mastering
- Chris Habib – sleeve graphics
