= Michael Parsons (composer) =

British composer (born 1938)

Michael Edward Parsons (born 12 December 1938) is a British composer. Since the 1960s, when he met Cornelius Cardew and helped found the Scratch Orchestra, Parsons has been strongly associated with the English school of experimental music. He was born in Bolton and studied at St John's College, Oxford before taking up composition lessons under Peter Racine Fricker at the Royal College of Music in London in 1961. In the 1960s he met Cornelius Cardew; Parsons attended Cardew's experimental music classes at Morley College since 1968. In 1969 Cardew, Parsons and fellow composer Howard Skempton founded the Scratch Orchestra, an experimental free ensemble devoted to performing contemporary music. The Orchestra broke up in early 1970s, partly as a result of the politization led by Cardew. Parsons was among the Orchestra members who refused to be associated with the Maoist politics Cardew was propagating, and left. In 1970 Parsons started working as visiting lecturer in the Fine Art department of the Portsmouth Polytechnic and in the Slade School of Art, University College London. In 1974 he and Skempton formed a duo to perform their own works. In 1996–97 Parsons was a bi-fellow at Churchill College, Cambridge. During this time he organised concerts at Kettle's Yard, Cambridge. Since the early 1960s Parsons has also been active as a writer on music; his writings include a number of important articles on contemporary English composers.

Parsons' music is influenced by Anton Webern, composers of the so-called New York school (John Cage, Morton Feldman and Christian Wolff), various English composers he met through Cardew and the Scratch Orchestra, and, since the Portsmouth years, "Systems" artists such as Malcolm Hughes and Jeffrey Steele.

== Publications ==
- Parsons, Michael (1976): "Systems in Art and Music", The Musical Times, Vol. 117, No. 1604 (Oct. 1976), pp. 815–18 accessed 16 February 2010
- Jems: Journal of Experimental Music Studies includes articles on Howard Skempton by Michael Parsons, as well as other materials on English experimental composers.
