= Christian Wolff (composer) =

American composer of experimental classical music (born 1934)

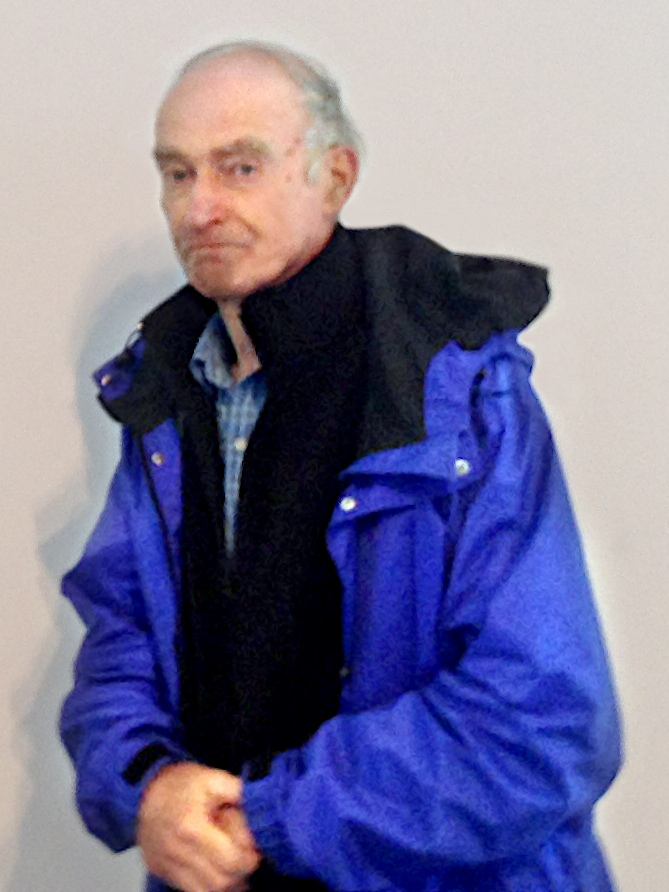
Wolff in 2012

Christian G. Wolff (born March 8, 1934) is an American composer of experimental classical music and classicist.

== Biography ==
Wolff was born in Nice, France, to the German literary publishers Helen and Kurt Wolff, who had published works by Franz Kafka, Robert Musil, and Walter Benjamin. After relocating to the U.S. in 1941, they helped to found Pantheon Books with other European intellectuals who had fled Europe during the rise of fascism. The Wolffs published a series of notable English translations of European literature, mostly, as well as an edition of the I Ching that came to greatly impress John Cage after Wolff had given him a copy.

Wolff became an American citizen in 1946. When he was sixteen (in 1950) his piano teacher Grete Sultan sent him for lessons in composition to the new music composer John Cage. Wolff soon became a close associate of Cage and his artistic circle which was part of the New York School and included the fellow composers Earle Brown and Morton Feldman, the pianist David Tudor, and the dancer and choreographer Merce Cunningham. Cage relates several anecdotes about Wolff in his one-minute Indeterminacy pieces.

Almost completely self-taught as composer, Wolff studied music under Sultan and Cage. Later Wolff studied classics at Harvard University (BA, PhD) and became an expert on Euripides. Wolff taught Classics at Harvard until 1970; thereafter he taught classics, comparative literature, and music at Dartmouth College. After nine years, he became Strauss Professor of Music there. He retired from teaching at Dartmouth in 1999. In 2004, he received an honorary degree from the California Institute of the Arts. He was also awarded the Foundation for Contemporary Arts John Cage Award (1996).

Wolff is married and has four children.

== Music ==
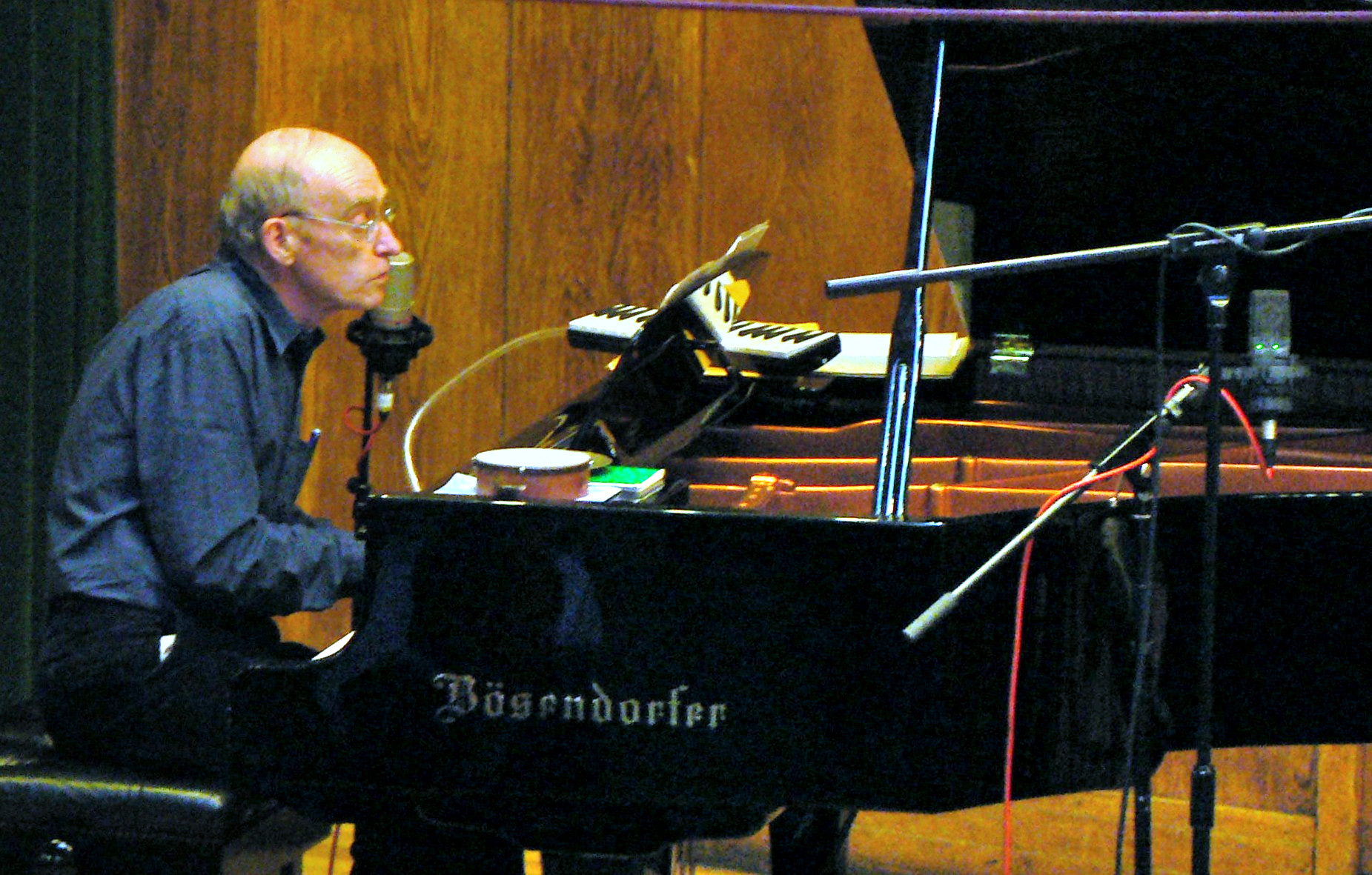
Wolff in 2009

Wolff's early compositional work included a lot of silence and was based initially on complicated rhythmic schema, and later on a system of aural cues. He innovated unique notational methods in his early scores and found creative ways of dealing with improvisation in his music. During the 1960s he developed associations with the composers Frederic Rzewski and Cornelius Cardew who spurred each other on in their respective explorations of experimental composition techniques and musical improvisation, and then, from the early 1970s, in their attempts to engage with political matters in their music. For Wolff this often involved the use of music and texts associated with protest and political movements such as the Wobblies. His later pieces, such as the sequence of pieces Exercises (1973-), offer some freedom to the performers. Some works, such as Changing the System (1973), Braverman Music (1978, after Harry Braverman), and the series of pieces Peace March (1983–2005) have an explicit political dimension, in that they respond to contemporary world events and express political ideals.

Wolff collaborated with Merce Cunningham for many years and developed a style which is more common now, but was revolutionary when they began working together in the 1950s – a style where music and dance occur simultaneously, yet somewhat independently of one another. Wolff stated, of any influence or affect, the greatest influence on his music over the years was the choreography of Cunningham. Wolff recently said of his work that it is motivated by his desire "to turn the making of music into a collaborative and transforming activity (performer into composer into listener into composer into performer, etc.), the cooperative character of the activity to the exact source of the music. To stir up, through the production of the music, a sense of social conditions in which we live and of how these might be changed."

Wolff's music reached a new audience when Sonic Youth's SYR4: Goodbye, 20th Century featured works by avant-garde classical composers such as John Cage, Yoko Ono, Steve Reich, and Christian Wolff played by Sonic Youth along with several collaborators from the modern avant-garde music scene, such as Christian Marclay, William Winant, Wharton Tiers, Takehisa Kosugi and others, as well as Wolff himself.

== Major works ==
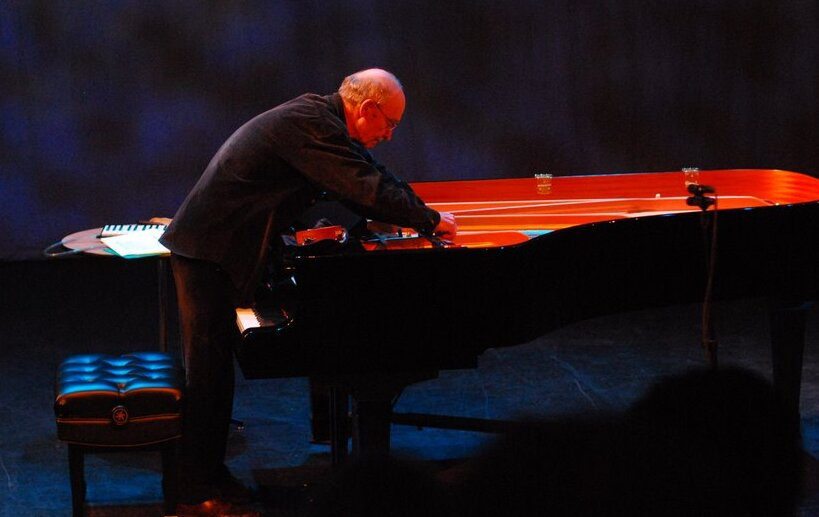
Christian Wolff at his prepared piano performance, 2007.

- Duo for Violins (1950)
- For Prepared Piano (1951)
- Duo for Pianists I (1957)
- For Piano With Preparations (1957)
- For Pianist (1959)
- Summer (for string quartet) (1961)
- For 1, 2, or 3 People (1964)
- Edges (1968)
- Pairs (1968)
- Prose Collection (1968–71)
- Tilbury 1, 2, and 3 (for piano) (1969)
- Snowdrop (for trombone, violin, and piano) (1970)
- Burdocks (1970–71)
- Exercises (1973- )
- Wobbly Music (1975–76)
- I Like to Think of Harriet Tubman (1985)
- Piano Trio (Greenham-Seneca-Camiso) (1985)
- Piano Miscellany (1988)
- Percussionist Songs (1994–95)
- Spring (for chamber orchestra) (1995)
- Berlin Exercises (2000)
- Ordinary Matter (2001–04)
- John Heartfield (Peace March 10) (2002)
- Long Piano (Peace March 11) (2004–05)
- Microexercises (2006)
- Winter Exercise (2013)
- Trio IX – Accanto (2017)
- Resistance (2017)
- Mountain Messengers (2020)
