= John Marcangelo =

English musician (born 1950)

John Marcangelo (born 1950, Whitehaven, Cumberland, England) is an English pianist, drummer and composer of folk rock.

== Early life ==
He comes from The Valley in Whitehaven in Cumberland. He went to St Begh's Catholic School, (now a junior school) on Coach Road, Whitehaven. He is the son of an Italian barber. He started his life in music with a band called The Invaders, in Cumbria, after leaving school, when earlier intending to go to Carlisle Art College. He later went to Leeds College of Music and trained as a classical musician (pianist and percussionist) where he met the violinist Mik Kaminski.

== Musical composition ==
After leaving college in Leeds, he went to London with Kaminski and drummer John Hodgson with their band called Cow, where Marcangelo played keyboard. He worked as a session musician and also in orchestra pits for musicals such as Hair. Kaminski then joined ELO in 1973. Marcangelo found a new musical partner in the composer Cornelius Cardew in their band called People's Liberation Music, with Vicky Silva as singer, Laurie Scott Baker on bass, and others. Together they worked with the opera singer Jane Manning and toured the world, recording the first music concert for the BBC World Service in communist China. Cardew was killed in a hit and run accident in 1981.

Marcangelo was asked by Kaminski to record an album with Violinski, and got another Cumbrian musician, Barry Dunnery a guitarist from Egremont, Cumbria, to join them. From the album No Cause for Alarm, recorded at the Musicland Studios in Munich, came Marcangelo's most well known composition, "Clog Dance" reaching number 17 in the UK Singles Chart in March 1979. Marcangelo then went on a European tour with Violinski and also contributed to their second and final album, Stop Cloning About. Marcangelo has worked on cruise ships, first on the QE2 as a drummer with the Ronnie Carroll Orchestra, and has since performed on many cruises with his wife Cathy as the Celeste Trio with keyboard player Dave Taylor from Distington. After which he arranged all the orchestral arrangements for his wife’s (Celeste Francis aka Catherine Marcangelo) Headline Show and travelled as her music director playing piano accompaniment on the world’s major cruise lines. In 2007 “Clog Dance the Musical” by John Marcangelo, was performed at Whitehaven Civic Hall to commemorate the 60th anniversary of the William Pit disaster, repeated in 2017 for the 70th Anniversary. The composition has also been arranged by Bill Charleson and Bill Bailey for brass band. His Big Band arrangements are used when Catherine Marcangelo performs with renowned Fatchops Big Band based in the Midlands.

== Video clips ==
- Top of the Pops
- Information on Clog Dance at Bayern 3 radio (in German)
