= Scratch Orchestra =

Experimental musical ensemble (1969–1974)

The Scratch Orchestra was an experimental musical ensemble founded in the spring of 1969 by Cornelius Cardew, Michael Parsons and Howard Skempton.

In the draft constitution published in the Musical Times of June 1969, Cardew defines a scratch orchestra as: "a large number of enthusiasts pooling their resources (not primarily material resources) and assembling for action (music-making, performance, edification)". The Orchestra reflected Cardew's musical philosophy at that time. This meant that anyone could join, graphic scores were used (rather than traditional sheet music), and there was an emphasis on improvisation. The Scratch Orchestra arose from Cardew's "Experimental Music" class at Morley College, London, which served as a venue for extra rehearsals for Scratch Orchestra concerts, but Scratch Orchestra rehearsals were also held separately. New Zealand artist/musician Philip Dadson was amongst those at Morley College who were in the foundation group for the Scratch Orchestra and, after returning to New Zealand, established a NZ Scratch Orchestra in 1970, which evolved into the group From Scratch in 1974.

The first meeting of the Scratch Orchestra was at St Katharine Docks, 1 July 1969. It was announced by means of a "Draft Constitution", published in The Musical Times in June 1969. The Draft Constitution set out categories of musical activity: Improvisation Rites, Popular Classics, Compositions, and Research Projects. Cardew also proposed that the responsibility of programming of concerts be assigned in reverse seniority, so that the first concert, on 1 November 1969 at Hampstead Town Hall, was designed by Christopher Hobbs, an eighteen-year-old student of Cardew's at the Royal Academy of Music. Original members included Carole Finer and Michael Chant who provided the list of concerts that follows.

Despite the emphasis on free improvisation, the varying experience of the members, and the "do your own thing" free aesthetic of the time, the Scratch Orchestra was a disciplined ensemble. Eventually the strains of Cardew's "reverse seniority", tensions between musically-trained and non-musically-trained members, and an increasing interest in political aesthetics led to a gradual change in the activities, and then the outlook of the ensemble. It was effectively inoperative by 1974.

== List of Concerts ==
SCRATCH ORCHESTRA CONCERTS (Compiled by original member Michael Chant.)

- Sat 1/11/69 Hampstead Town Hall
- Sat 8/11/69 Islington Town Hall
- Sat 15/11/69 Chelsea Town Hall (Journey of the Isle of Wight – westwards – by iceburg – to Tokio Bay [spelling as advertised])
- Tues 25/11/69 Ealing Town Hall
- Sat 20/12/69 S.E. Berks College
- Sun 11/1/70 New Arts Laboratory (Presentation No.8 Scrapbook for 1960 compiled by Bevan Jones)
- Sat 7/2/70 Group Shout in National Gallery
- Sun 1/3/70 New Arts Laboratory (Music Now Instrumental Ensemble)
- 25/3/70 Pavilions in the Parks, Greenwich Arts Festival (for one week)
- Thurs 2/4/70 St Pancras Town Hall, now, Camden Town Hall (Presentation No.12 ‘No Title’)
- Thurs 9/4/70 International Students House (Presentation No.13)
- Thurs 16/4/70 St Pancras Town Hall, now, Camden Town Hall (Presentation No.14 Rocks)
- Sat 16/5/70 Richmond Journey Stefan Szczelkun's perambulatory concert
- Fri 24/4/70 St John the Evangelist, Smith Square (Presentation No.11 Roger Smalley Memorial Concert)
- Thurs 30/4/70 St Pancras Town Hall, now, Camden Town Hall (Presentation No.15 Prizewinners’ Concert)
- Thurs 4/6/70 St Stephen’s Walbrook
- Sat 11/7/70 Presentation No.17, Regent’s Park boating lake concert
- Sat 11/7/70 (viewing of “Fantastic Journey”, Starlight Cinema, Mayfair Hotel)
- July 25 – August 8, 1970 Village Concerts (one week in Cornwall, the next in Anglesey)
- Fri 25/9/70 Purcell Room, Beethoven Today
- From 11/10/70 Zees Arts, gallery in Chiltern street. 'Afternoon Teas'
- Mon 23/11/70 Queen Elizabeth Hall, Pilgrimage from Scattered Points on the surface of the body to the brain, the inner ear, the heart & the stomach
- Sat 28/11/70 University of Essex (ICE NINE)
- Fri 11/12/70 German Institute (Presentation No.7)
- Tues 29/12/70 Masked Ball, Chelsea Town Hall.
- Sat 6/2/71 Seaside Concert, Dorset coast
- Thurs 25/2/71 Ealing Town Hall, The Balkan Sobranie Smoking Mixture (Greg Bright)
- Fri 5/3/71 concert
- Thurs 13/5/71 German Institute, 'Wandelkonzert'
- Sat 15/5/71 'Afterdark' at Primrose Hill
- Sat 22/5/71 Beauty, promise of happiness, between Hampden road & Ruper road, N19
- Sat 5/6/71 Holland Park Comprehensive School, GYMNASIUM
- Sun 6/6/71 Concert in a field at Tatsfield (flyer says 6/5/71)
- Sat 19/6/71 (and following week) North East of England camping and concerts trip
- 11 - 30 August 1971 The Scratch Orchestra Cottage at Art Spectrum in Alexandra Palace
- 30 Aug – 3 Sept 1971 Scratch Orchestra Summer School at The Place
- Fri 21/1/72 Cecil Sharp House, Cornelius Cardew's The Great Learning Paragraph 5
- Wed 26/1/72 Bluecoat Hall, Liverpool
- Tues 28/3/72 Burdocks (Christian Wolff)
- Thurs 25/5/72 Conway Hall, The Jenny Robbins Concert
- Sat 17/6/72 In the Shadow of Westway
- Thurs 24/8/72 Royal Albert Hall (Promenade Concert)
- Aug 27 – Sept 9, 1972 Munich fortnight
- Sat 9/12/72 Birmingham Arts Lab
- Fri 11/5/73 London School of Economics Old Theatre, The explorers club
- Fri 25/1/74 Institute of Contemporary Arts, Art to Serve the People
- Tues 5/3/74 Cornelius Cardew Revolutionary songs and arrangements

The British Sound Archive at the British Library has archive materials from Cardew.
