= Cornelius Cardew =

English experimental composer

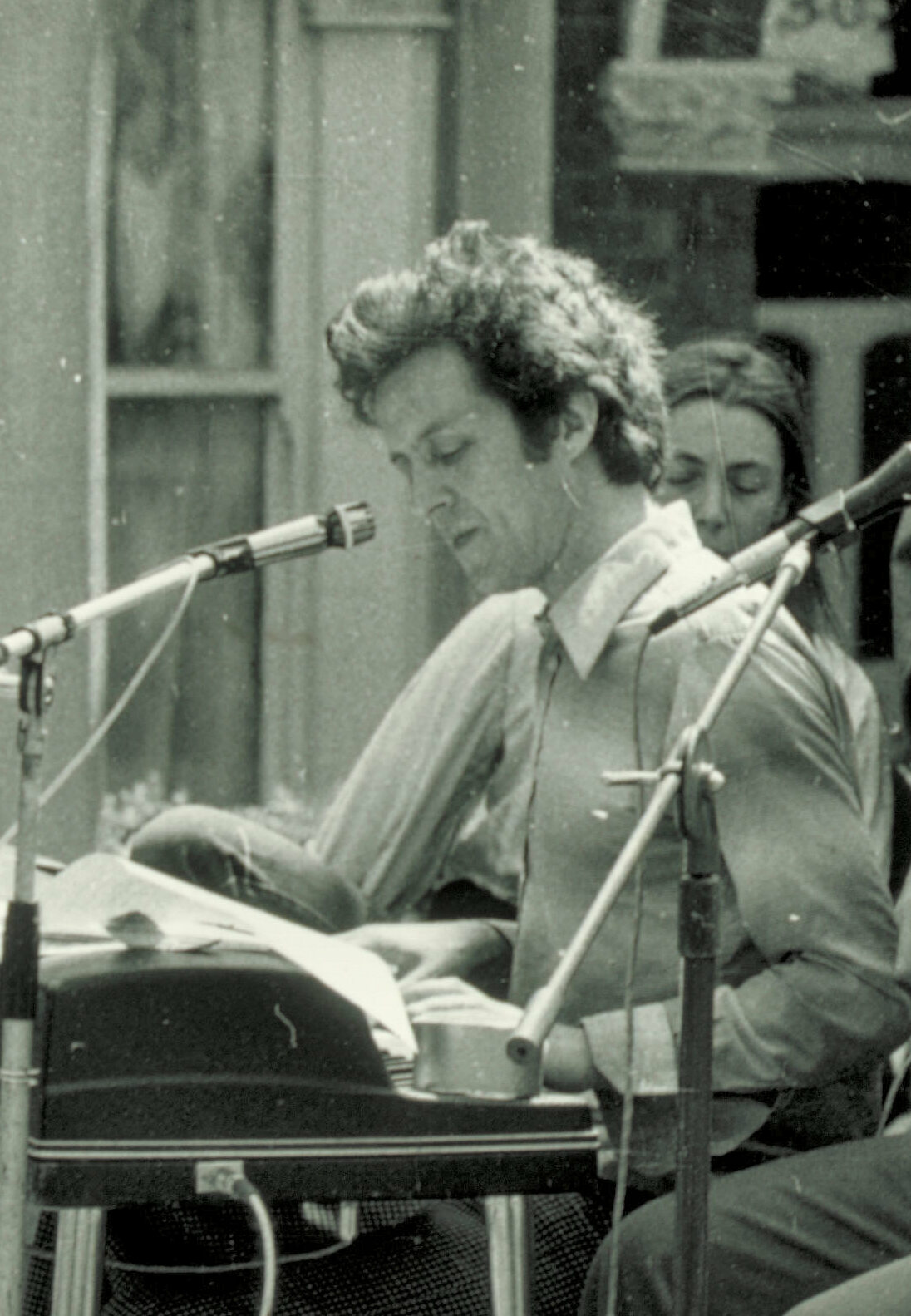
- Cardew in 1977

Background information
- Born: 7 May 1936; Winchcombe, Gloucestershire, England
- Died: 13 December 1981 (aged 45) London, England
- Occupations: Composer; writer; pamphleteer
- Years active: 1960–1981
- Formerly of: Scratch Orchestra

Cornelius Cardew (7 May 1936 – 13 December 1981) was an English contemporary composer, and founder (with Howard Skempton and Michael Parsons) of the Scratch Orchestra, an experimental performing ensemble. He later rejected experimental and avant-garde music in favor of activity as a writer and pamphleteer in the Revolutionary Communist Party, declaring he had "discontinued composing in an avant-garde idiom" in his notes to his Piano Album 1973.

== Biography ==
Cardew was born on 7 May 1936, in Winchcombe, Gloucestershire. He was the second of three sons whose parents were both artists—his father was potter Michael Cardew. The family moved to Wenford Bridge Pottery in Cornwall a few years after his birth where he was first nurtured as a chorister at Canterbury Cathedral, and later at The King's School, Canterbury which had evacuated to the Carlyon Bay Hotel for the war. His musical career thus began as a chorister. From 1953 to 1957, Cardew studied piano, cello, and composition at the Royal Academy of Music in London.

== Career ==
Having won a scholarship to study at the recently established Studio for Electronic Music in Cologne, Cardew served as an assistant to Karlheinz Stockhausen from 1958 to 1960. He was given the task of independently working out the composition plans for the German composer's score Carré, and Stockhausen noted:

As a musician he was outstanding because he was not only a good pianist but also a good improviser and I hired him to become my assistant in the late 50s and he worked with me for over three years. I gave him work to do which I have never given to any other musician, which means to work with me on the score I was composing. He was one of the best examples that you can find among musicians because he was well informed about the latest theories of composition as well as being a performer.

=== Indeterminacy and American experimentalists ===
In 1958, Cardew witnessed a series of concerts in Cologne by John Cage and David Tudor which had a considerable influence on him, leading him to abandon post-Schönbergian serial composition and develop the indeterminate and experimental scores for which he is best known. He was particularly prominent in introducing the works of American experimental composers such as Morton Feldman, La Monte Young, Earle Brown, Christian Wolff, and Cage to an English audience during the early to mid sixties.

Cardew's most important scores from his experimental period are Treatise (1963–67), a 193-page graphic score which allows for considerable freedom of interpretation, and The Great Learning, a work in seven parts or "Paragraphs," based on translations of Confucius by Ezra Pound. The Great Learning instigated the formation of the Scratch Orchestra. During those years, he took a course in graphic design and he made his living as a graphic designer at Aldus Books in London.

In 1966, Cardew joined the free improvisation group AMM as cellist and pianist. AMM had formed the previous year and included English jazz musicians Lou Gare, Eddie Prévost, Keith Rowe, and one of his first students at the Royal Academy Christopher Hobbs. Performing with the group allowed Cardew to explore music in a completely democratic environment, freely improvising without recourse to scores.

While teaching an experimental music class at London's Morley College in 1968, Cardew, along with Howard Skempton and Michael Parsons formed the Scratch Orchestra, a large experimental ensemble, initially for the purposes of interpreting Cardew's The Great Learning. The Scratch Orchestra gave performances throughout Britain and elsewhere until its demise in 1972. It was during this period that the question of art for whom was hotly debated within the context of the Orchestra, which Cardew came to see as elitist despite its numerous attempts to make socially accessible music.

=== Communist affiliation and activity ===
Cardew published the inflammatory essays "Cage; Ghost or Monster?" and "Stockhausen Serves Imperialism" in 1972 and 1974, respectively, accusing his former colleagues, John Cage and Karlheinz Stockhausen, of essentially serving imperialist and bourgeois agendas through the art world. Cardew became a member of the Revolutionary Communist Party of Britain (Marxist-Leninist) in the 1970s, and in 1979 achieved the status of a co-founder and member of the Central Committee of the RCP. His creative output, from the demise of the Scratch Orchestra until his death, was strongly committed to communist rhetoric; his 1974 Thälmann Variations commemorated Ernst Thälmann, leader of the Communist Party of Germany from 1925 to 1933, and he joined the People's Liberation Music collective with John Tilbury.

At a 1976 meeting of the Central London branch of the Musicians Union, he tabled a motion denouncing David Bowie as a fascist, after Bowie said as his persona of The Thin White Duke that "Britain could benefit from a fascist leader." The motion asserted that "[s]uch ideas prepare the way for political situations in which the Trade Union movement can be destroyed, as it was in Nazi Germany." Although the vote was a tie, at twelve for and twelve against, a second motion was passed with a majority of 15–2, and pamphlets and publications were made further denouncing Bowie and other popular music figures.

== Death ==
On 13 December 1981, Cardew was killed in a hit-and-run car crash near his London home in Leyton at age 45. The driver has never been found.

Tilbury, in his book Cornelius Cardew—A Life Unfinished, said he believed Cardew was killed because of his prominent Marxist-Leninist involvement, which "cannot be ruled out". John Maharg is recorded as saying in relation to his death that "MI5 are quite ruthless; people don't realise it. And they kill pre-emptively". However, Skempton recalled the weather conditions prevailing at the time of Cardew's death, and said that Cardew was walking in the road to avoid icy pavements, and might have been hit by a disoriented driver who fled to avoid arrest.

== In popular culture ==
- In 1999, Page 183 of Cardew's Treatise was performed by the experimental rock group Sonic Youth on their album SYR4: Goodbye 20th Century.
- "Cornelius Cardew" is the name of the unemployed pipe-fitter in Alan Moore's Skizz.
- A character called "Cornelius Cardew" appears (as a caricature of a political radical) in the 1980 novel The Shooting Party.
- The German musician and composer Ekkehard Ehlers published a Cardew-inspired work in 2001, titled Ekkehard Ehlers plays Cornelius Cardew, which was released on Staubgold Records.
- The US band The Music Lovers name-checked Cardew in the song, "Thank You, Cornelius Cardew". It appears on their 2006 album, The Music Lovers' Guide for Young People.

== Discography ==
- The Great Learning (Deutsche Grammophon, 1971)
- Four Principles on Ireland and Other Pieces 1974 (Cramps, 1975)
- Memorial Concert (Impetus, 1985)
- Thälmann Variations (Matchless, 1986)
- Piano Music (B&L, 1991)
- Piano Music 1959–70 (Matchless, 1996)
- Treatise (hatART, 1999)
- We Only Want the Earth (Musicnow, 2001)
- Apartment House Chamber Music 1955–64 (Matchless, 2001)
- We Sing for the Future! (New Albion, 2001)
- Material (hatART, 2004)
- Consciously (Musicnow, 2006)
- Treatise with Keith Rowe (Planam, 2009)
- Treatise with Petr Kotik (Mode, 2009)
- Works 1960–70 (+3 dB, 2010)
- Treatise (Harsh-Noise Version) (Sublime Recapitulation, 2013)
