= Jonathan Powell (musician) =

British pianist (1969–2025)

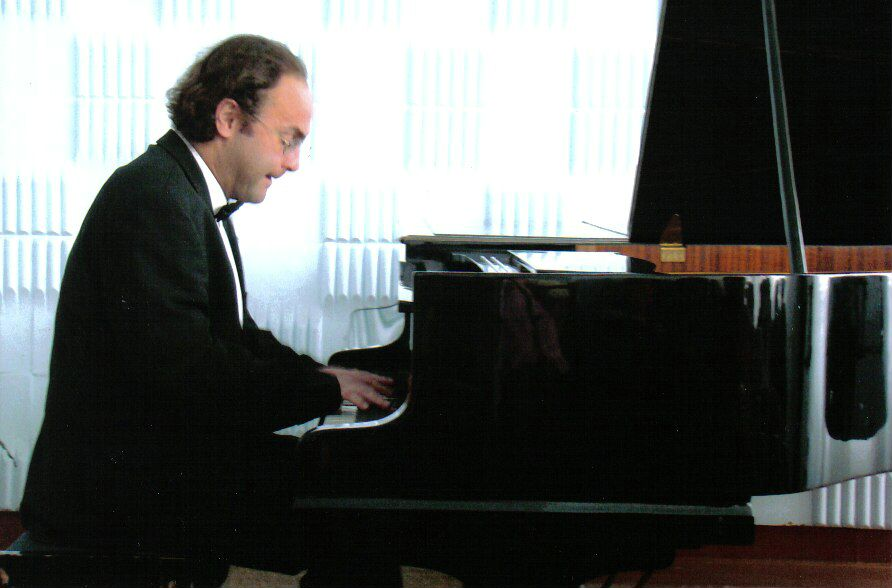
- Powell in 2010
- Born: November 12, 1969; Lancashire, England
- Died: 27 December 2025 (aged 56); Brighton, England
- Education: University of Cambridge
- Occupations: Pianist; musicologist; music editor; composer
- Years active: 1969–2025
- Spouse: Irena Powell
- Children: 2
- Website: jonathanpowell.wordpress.com

Jonathan Powell (12 November 1969 – 27 December 2025) was a British pianist, musicologist, music editor and self-taught composer. He wrote piano sonatas and string quartets, among other chamber music. As a player and musicologist, he focused on music from Russia and Eastern Europe around 1900, such as Alexander Scriabin, whose biography he contributed to The New Grove Dictionary of Music and Musicians. He recorded rarely-played music from the period, piano solo works by Georgi Conus, Konstantin Eiges, Aleksandr Goldenweiser, Egon Kornauth, Joseph Marx and Leonid Sabaneyev, among others, and piano concertos by Hans Winterberg and Xaver Scharwenka.

Powell lectured and played concerts regularly at Oxford University, and taught at institutions in Europe and the Cornish College of the Arts in Seattle. He was known for tackling the music by Kaikhosru Shapurji Sorabji, including the eight-hour Sequentia cyclica, which he premiered in 2010 and released to critical acclaim in 2020. A reviewer noted that "the pianist's intelligent, fluid pacing and astute scaling of dynamics address Sorabji's architectural ambitions seriously".

== Life and career ==
Powell was born in Lancashire on 12 November 1969. His family inherited a piano when he was age six. The first grand piano he could use for practising, at age 14, was made by Bechstein. His piano teacher in his late teens was Denis Matthews.

Powell made his performing debut at the age of 20 in the Purcell Room in London. He studied musicology at the University of Cambridge, graduating with a thesis about Scriabin's influence on Russian composers. He then studied piano further with Sulamita Aronovsky.

=== Pianist ===
Powell's repertoire ranged from Bach to contemporary works, and included composers as varied as Michael Finnissy, John White, Alistair Hinton, Marco Ambrosini, Johannes Maria Staud, Ákos Nagy and Christophe Sirodeau. He played UK premieres of works by Salvatore Sciarrino, Morton Feldman and Esa-Pekka Salonen, and commissioned new compositions. In chamber music, he performed with sopranos Sarah Leonard, Svetlana Sozdateleva and Irena Troupova, flautist Matteo Cesari, violinists Ashot Sarkisjan and Marcus Barcham Stevens, and cellist Rohan de Saram. He appeared on the radio, often for the BBC, but also abroad, such as France Musique. He played at festivals such as Musica Nova Festival in Helsinki, Raritäten der Klaviermusik near Husum, Heidelberger Frühling, and the Indian Summer in Levoča festival every year since it was founded in 2007. He performed at venues such as the Elbphilharmonie, Wigmore Hall, the Russian Academy of Music in Moscow and the Royal Festival Hall in London. He focused on Scriabin's ten piano sonatas in 2009, played Messiaen's Vingt Regards sur l'enfant-Jésus and Iberia by Albéniz in 2013, combined Beethoven's Hammerklavier Sonata and Max Reger's Bach variations in 2015, played Liszt's Piano Sonata in B minor and Stockhausen's piano pieces in 2017, and Shostakovich's 24 Preludes and Fugues in 2018.

Powell focused on works of the late Romantic era, including Russian and Eastern European music around 1900. He performed works by Valentyn Silvestrov, Viktor Ullmann, and Hans Winterberg. A 2019 recital combined Scriabin's Piano Sonata No. 10, piano pieces by Georgi Conus, and Rachmaninoff's Piano Sonata No. 2 in its first version. In a 2024 recital he combined works by Egon Kornauth, Szymanowski, Felix Blumenfeld, Alban Berg, Jean Sibelius, Isaac Albéniz and Josef Suk.

Powell was known for his advocacy of the music of Kaikhosru Shapurji Sorabji, which he began performing regularly in the early 2000s. He gave multiple public performances of Sorabji's four-hour Opus clavicembalisticum (1929–30) and premiered other works by Sorabji, including the substantial Fourth Piano Sonata (1929) and the five-hour Piano Symphony No. 6, Symphonia claviensis (1975–76). Powell gave the world premiere of Sorabji's eight-hour Sequentia cyclica super "Dies irae" ex Missa pro defunctis (SC, 1948–49) in Glasgow in 2010. In 2020, he released the premiere recording of the work, which was met with considerable critical acclaim and was recognised by the Preis der deutschen Schallplattenkritik for the second quarter of 2020. Music writer Jed Distler said that Powell's performance has "a level of specificity and tonal application that gives new meaning to the word 'painstaking'", "the pianist's intelligent, fluid pacing and astute scaling of dynamics address Sorabji’s architectural ambitions seriously", making "a compelling and standard-setting case for SC that will be hard to equal, let alone surpass". Composer Christian B. Carey wrote that "Powell's dedicated work on behalf of Sorabji makes the composer's legacy seem assured." John Quinn described it as a "technically remarkable, idiomatically perceptive performance" of "a massive work performed with unremittingly massive conviction".

Powell's discography also includes CDs for the Altarus, Largo, Toccata, ASV and Danacord labels, featuring works by Aleksandr Goldenweiser, Joseph Marx, Alexander Krein, Konstantin Eiges, and others.

=== Composer ===
Powell composed mostly chamber music, vocal pieces and works for solo piano including several sonatas. His early works, such as String Quartet No. 1, show influences by Brian Ferneyhough, Finnissy, Luigi Nono, and Iannis Xenakis. His music has been performed in concerts since the 1980s. A rebours (2001) was premiered by the London Sinfonietta with pianist Nicolas Hodges. His String Quartet No. 2, completed in 2003, was first played by the Arditti Quartet.

After years of no compositions, due to a focus on his other activities, he wrote the Violin Sonata in 2010, a cycle of piano miniatures entitled Zagórów and Other Places in 2019, performed in Gdańsk, Brno and Katowice, and a Partita for solo piano in 2020 for his friend Christophe Sirodeau, also a composer and pianist, for his 50th birthday.

=== Musicologist and editor ===
Powell contributed several articles to the second edition of The New Grove Dictionary of Music and Musicians, including the one on Scriabin, and published articles on various Soviet and Russian composers. His articles were published by Musiikki, a Finnish musicological journal, and by International Piano. He contributed to a book about Samuil Feinberg, also a pianist and composer, and was co-editor for Rimsky-Korsakov and his Heritage.

Powell worked as an editor of musical rarities, focusing on little-known piano repertoire. Among other projects, he edited the previously unpublished 11 piano pieces by Joseph Marx for Universal Edition on behalf of the Joseph Marx Society, Vienna.

He was a regular guest at Oxford University to play three concerts a year at the Jacqueline du Pré Hall, as well as teach and run workshops. He also taught at the Janáček Academy of Performing Arts in Brno, the Hogeschool Gent, the Guildhall School of Music and Drama in London, Det Jyske Musikkonservatorium, and the Cornish College of the Arts in Seattle, among others.

=== Personal life ===
Powell was married to Irena Powell, also a pianist; they had two sons and lived in Poland.

Powell died in Brighton, England, on 27 December 2025, at the age of 56.

== Recordings ==
- Alexander Krein:
  - After Scriabin
  - Songs of the Ghetto (ASV)
- Grigory Krein: Piano Music (Toccata Classics)
- Kaikhosru Shapurji Sorabji:
  - Villa Tasca, Passeggiata Veneziana
  - Piano Sonata No. 4
  - Rosario d'arabeschi, Gulistān
  - Concerto per suonare da me solo
  - Fantasia Ispanica
  - Un nido di scatole, Djāmi, St. Bertrand de Comminges
  - Toccata No. 1
  - Sequentia cyclica (Piano Classics)
- Jānis Mediņš: 24 Dainas (Preludes) (Toccata)
- Andrew Toovey: The Moon Falls Through the Autumn (Largo)
- Joseph Marx:
  - Lieder, with Sarah Leonard, soprano (Altarus)
  - Schmetterlingsgeschichten (Danacord)
- Christophe Sirodeau: Obscur chemin des étoiles
- John White: Adventures at the Keyboard (Convivium)
- Egon Kornauth: Piano Music Vol. 1 (Toccata)
- Aleksandr Goldenweiser: Piano Music Vol. 1 (Toccata)
- Leonid Sabaneyev: Piano Music Vol. 1 (Toccata)
- Hans Winterberg:
  - Piano Sonatas (Toccata)
  - Piano Concerto No. 1 (Cappriccio, 2022), with Berlin Radio Symphony Orchestra conducted by Johannes Kalitzke
- Georgi Conus: Piano Music (Toccata)
- Konstantin Eiges: Piano Music (Toccata)
- Morgan Hayes: solo piano works and a concertante piece (NMC)
- Xaver Scharwenka: Piano Concerto No. 1, with Łukasz Borowicz conducting the Poznań Philharmonic (CPO, 2024)
