= Nikolai Zhilyayev =

Nikolai Zhilyayev may refer to:

- Nikolai Zhilyayev (musicologist) (1881–1938), Russian musicologist
- Nikolai Zhilyayev (footballer) (born 1987), Russian soccer player
