= Christophe Sirodeau =

French pianist and composer (born 1970)

- Born: 1970 (age 55–56); Paris, France
- Education: Conservatoire de Paris; Moscow Conservatory
- Occupations: Composer; Pianist

Christophe Sirodeau (born 1970 in Paris) is a French pianist and composer. He is particularly known for championing the music of Samuil Feinberg.

== Life and career ==
Sirodeau started to compose at the age of 10 and although mainly self-taught as a composer, he later consulted with the musicologist Vladimir Chinayev and the composer Victoria Borisova-Ollas. Also influential was Alain Poirier’s analysis course at the Conservatoire de Paris (1993–5).

His compositions have been performed and recorded by Riitta-Maija Ahonen (mezzo-soprano), Eiichi Chijiiwa (violin), Jyväskylä Sinfonia, Sami Luttinen (bass), Orchestre National de Montpellier, Novalis String Quartet, Jonathan Powell (piano), Nikolaos Samaltanos (piano), Hannele Segerstam (violin), Leif Segerstam (conductor), Pia Segerstam (cello), Souliko String Quartet, Adriaan de Wit (piano).

As a pianist, he studied with Yevgeny Malinin (from 1982 to 1992, including 3 years at the Moscow Conservatory), and has been encouraged in his studies by the pianist-composers Milosz Magin, Tatyana Nikolayeva and György Cziffra, by the violinist Vladimir Gutnikov, the actor Innokenty Smoktunovsky and the musicologist Henry-Louis de La Grange. Among his others teachers were Alberto Neuman, Thérèse Dussaut, Olga Lartshenko and Dora Rybac.

Since making his performing debut in 1982, he has performed a broad variety of repertoire in concert, recordings and broadcasts, specialising somewhat in the presentation of rarely heard music (Viktor Ullmann, Samuil Feinberg, Skalkottas, Kapralova for example). In the 1990s he undertook significant scholarly and performing work concerning Samuil Feinberg, which resulted in the composer's 1st Piano Concerto and a number of unpublished songs and piano works coming to light and receiving their first performances and recordings since the 1930s, and in some cases, their world premieres.

== Main works ==
Orchestral music

7 Symphonies (including the 4th with clarinet or viola solo, 5th with 'cello solo, 3rd and 6th with soprano solo) 1 other piece for orchestra with a solo piano

Chamber music

1 Septet

1 Quintet 3 String Quartets

1 String Trio

4 Trios with piano

Several duos for 'cello and piano or violin and piano

Several other chamber music pieces without piano

3 Suites for solo piano

Several other pieces for solo piano

1 piece for organ

Pieces for solo 'cello, solo violin and solo viola

Vocal music

3 Songs cycles with piano

1 Songs cycle with 'cello

1 song with piano and 'cello

1 electronic music piece

== Discography ==
- Scriabin, Roslavets, Lourié and Feinberg (Arkadia, 1994)
- Skalkottas - Ulysses’ Return for 2 pianos (with N. Samaltanos), Agorà Musica, 1995
- Chamber music of Leif Segerstam (BIS, 1996)
- Skalkottas - Chamber Concerto (BIS, 2003)
- Samuil Feinberg - complete Piano Sonatas (with N. Samaltanos), BIS, 2003–04
- Obscur chemin des étoiles - Orchestral, chamber and solo works of Christophe Sirodeau (Altarus Records, 2007)
- Samuil Feinberg - 1st Piano Concerto (Helsinki Philharmonic Orchestra / Leif Segerstam) and solo piano pieces (Altarus Records, 2008)
- Victoria Borisova-Ollas - Im Klosterhofe for cello, piano and tape (with Pia Segerstam) CD Phono Suecia, 2008
- Samuil Feinberg - Songs (with Riitta-Maija Ahonen and Sami Luttinen), Altarus Records, 2009
