= Zhilyayev =

Zhilyayev (Russian: Жиляев) is a Russian patronymic surname derived from the nickname Zhilyay (Жиляй). The latter is derived from the dialectal verb жилять, "to sting", "to irritate". Notable people with the surname include:

- Alla Zhilyayeva (born 1969), female long-distance runner from Russia
- Nikolai Zhilyayev (musicologist) (1881–1938), Russian musicologist
- Nikolai Zhilyayev (footballer) (born 1987), Russian soccer player
- Yevgeniy Zhilyayev (born 1973), Kazakh water polo player
