= Sequentia cyclica =

Piano composition by Kaikhosru Shapurji Sorabji

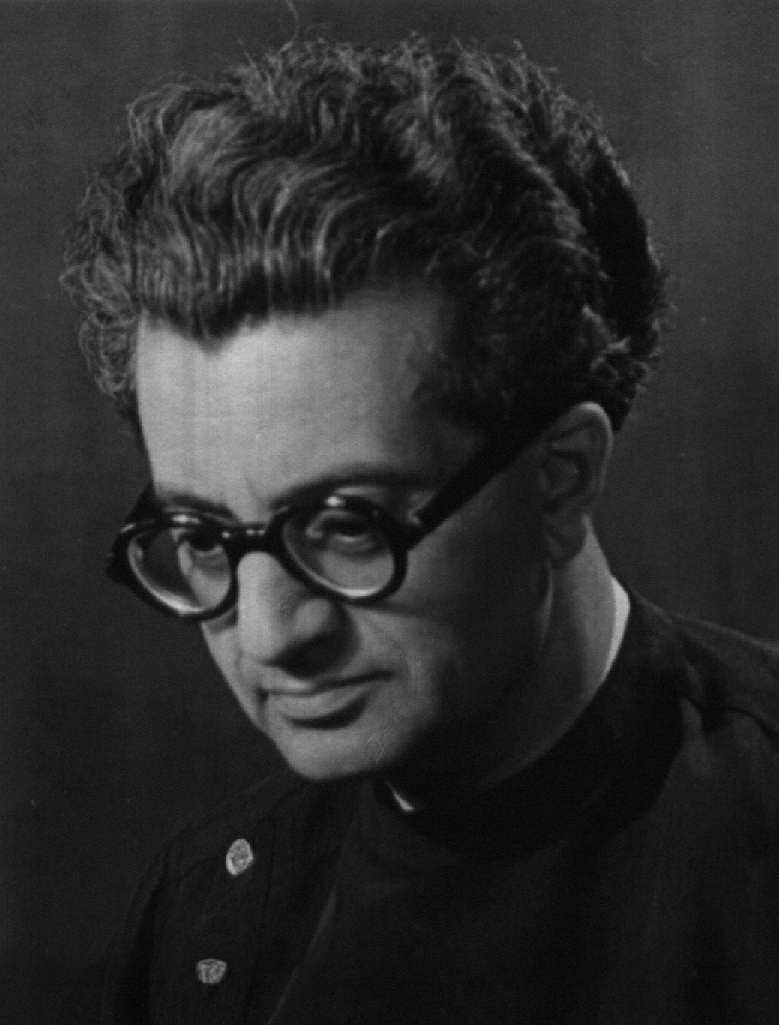
Kaikhosru Shapurji Sorabji, the piece's composer, around 1950

Sequentia cyclica super "Dies irae" ex Missa pro defunctis (Ecclesiastical Latin: Cyclical Sequence on 'The Day of Wrath' from the Mass for the Dead), commonly known as Sequentia cyclica (Cyclical Sequence), is a piano composition by Kaikhosru Shapurji Sorabji. Written between 1948 and 1949, it is a set of twenty-seven variations on the medieval sequence Dies irae and is widely considered one of Sorabji's greatest works. With a duration of about eight hours, it is one of the longest piano pieces of all time.

== History ==
=== Background and composition ===
The Gregorian chant Dies irae, the text of which has traditionally been attributed to Thomas of Celano, a 13th-century Italian friar, attracted Sorabji throughout his life. It was used in ten of his works, including two variation sets. The first of these, Variazioni e fuga triplice sopra "Dies irae" per pianoforte (1923–26), is a work Sorabji became dissatisfied with, writing in a 1930 letter to Erik Chisholm, "I shall probably indeed I am seriously thinking of destroying Dies Irae—I have been looking on it with a sour cold eye and I don't think really, it pleases me any more ... and write an entirely new work thereon later."

It has usually been accepted that Sorabji began work on Sequentia cyclica in 1948, although Marc-André Roberge's catalogue of Sorabji's works states it was started before January 1948. The work was completed on 27 April 1949. In a letter written shortly after, Sorabji told Chisholm that he finished it during his third attack of malaria.

=== Score ===
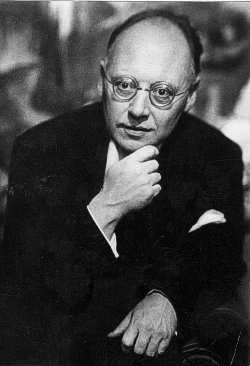
Egon Petri, to whom the work was dedicated

The score of Sequentia cyclica contains a prefatory note relating to the work and its performance. Sorabji elaborated on the relative lack of expression marks in the score, writing:

The comparative lack of what are quaintly called "expression marks" in this work is thus explained. The composer considers that the music itself makes clear what "expression" is needed, if any in any particular passage. The "intelligence" of the player will do—or undo—the rest.

The full name of the piece, as it appears on the title page of the manuscript, is Sequentia cyclica super "Dies irae" ex Missa pro defunctis in clavicembali usum Kaikhosru Shapurji Sorabji scripsit. (Note: "Cyclic sequence on 'Dies irae' from the mass of the dead written for the use of the piano by Kaikhosru Shapurji Sorabji".) It was dedicated to Dutch pianist Egon Petri, who at one time contemplated performing Sorabji's Opus clavicembalisticum. Sorabji corresponded with him over the years and considered him one of the greatest living pianists.

=== Performances and reception ===
Sequentia cyclica is one of Sorabji's most highly regarded works, even being considered by some to be his greatest. In 1953, Sorabji described it as "the climax and crown of his work for the piano and, in all probability, the last he will write", and he continued to regard it as one of his finest works up to his last days.

The work received its premiere on 18 June 2010 in Glasgow, UK, under the hands of Jonathan Powell, who had given partial performances of the piece in 2008 and earlier that year, and went on to play Sequentia cyclica elsewhere in Europe and the United States. Powell recorded the piece in 2015 and it was released in 2020 by Piano Classics.

== Music ==
Although Sorabji's first set of variations on the chant, Variazioni e fuga triplice sopra "Dies irae" per pianoforte (1923–26), is a large work, comprising 64 variations and spanning 201 pages, Sequentia cyclica is even vaster. Its theme and 27 variations cover 335 pages and take about eight hours to perform, (Note: Jonathan Powell's first performance of the complete work took over seven hours, while his studio recording of the piece occupies nearly eight and a half hours.).

In discussing Sorabji's variation sets, musicologist Simon John Abrahams writes, "Sorabji often follows the examples of Reger and Szymanowski in producing variations that maintain only the most tenuous of connections to the original theme". A similar view was expressed by Sorabji himself, who wrote that the variations in Sequentia cyclica were "hardly to be called variations in the ordinary sense". Some of them set the theme multiple times (e.g. variations 8, 14 and 18, where it is set seven, four and two times respectively), which has been cited as one of the reasons for the work's length.

=== Sections ===
- Theme, "Largo. Legatissimo sempre e nello stile medioevale detto 'organum'": The opening presents the entire Dies irae chant, with its repetitions being skipped. The section is in F♯ minor, with the theme appearing in plain chords and underpinned by the sonority C♯–F♯–C♯ nearly throughout.
- Variation 1, "Vivace (spiccato assai)"
- Variation 2, "Moderato"
- Variation 3, "Legato, soave e liscio"
- Variation 4, "Tranquillo e piano"
- Variation 5, "Ardito, focosamente"
- Variation 6, "Vivace e leggiero"
- Variation 7, "L'istesso tempo"
- Variation 8, "Tempo di valzer con molta fantasia, disinvoltura e eleganza"
- Variation 9, "Capriccioso"
- Variation 10, "Il tutto in una sonorità piena, dolce, morbida, calda e voluttuosa"
- Variation 11, "Vivace e secco"
- Variation 12, "Leggiero a capriccio"
- Variation 13, "Aria: Con fantasia e dolcezza"
- Variation 14, "Punta d'organo": This variation uses the note B as a pedal point throughout. Like other of Sorabji's similarly titled movements of a nocturnal character, it has been likened to "Le Gibet", the second section of Ravel's Gaspard de la nuit. Towards the end, Sorabji switches to a B♭ note in the bass, on which the movement concludes.
- Variation 15, "Ispanica"
- Variation 16, "Marcia funebre"
- Variation 17, "Soave e dolce"
- Variation 18, "Duro, irato, energico"
- Variation 19, "Quasi Debussy"
- Variation 20, "Spiccato, leggiero"
- Variation 21, "Legatissimo, dolce e soave"
- Variation 22, "Passacaglia": The theme of the passacaglia is the shortened version of the Dies irae that has been prevalent in most works to use the melody (i.e. the first three phrases). It contains 100 variations, with the theme gradually rising from the bass to the soprano (with a voice change every 25 variations). Soft textures predominate in the later variations, with the theme returning to the bass towards the end.
- Variation 23, "Con brio"
- Variation 24, "Oscuro, sordo"
- Variation 25, "Sotto voce, scorrevole"
- Variation 26, "Largamente pomposo e maestoso": This variation begins and ends with sections built largely on chordal textures, with a "Quasi Cadenza-fantasiata" being placed between them.
- Variation 27, "Fuga quintuplice a due, tre, quattro, cinque e sei voci ed a cinque soggetti": The final variation is a six-voice fugue on five subjects. It is broken down into five fugues (each on a single theme), going from two voices to six (one being added with each fugue). The fifth fugue culminates in a section titled "Le Strette: delle quinta parte della fuga", which is followed by a "Stretto maestrale". This passage is one of the few polyrhythmic fugal climaxes in Sorabji's output, along with that in his Piano Symphony No. 2 (1954). The work concludes with a "Coda" ending in C minor, thus establishing a tritonal relationship with the F♯ minor opening of the piece—a reference to the medieval notion of "diabolus in musica".

== See also ==
- List of variations on a theme by another composer

== Notes and references ==
=== Sources ===
- Abrahams, Simon John (2002). Le mauvais jardinier: A Reassessment of the Myths and Music of Kaikhosru Shapurji Sorabji (PhD). King's College London.
- Hinton, Alistair (2011). "Glasgow, University Concert Hall: Sorabji's 'Sequentia Cyclica'". Tempo 65 (255), p. 58. JSTOR 23020616. Retrieved 6 February 2020. (subscription required)
- Mead, Andrew (2016). "Gradus Ad Sorabji". Perspectives of New Music, vol. 54, no. 2, pp. 181–218. JSTOR 10.7757/persnewmusi.54.2.0181. Retrieved 15 May 2020. (subscription required)
- Rapoport, Paul, ed. (1992). Sorabji: A Critical Celebration. Aldershot: Scolar Press. ISBN 0-85967-923-3.
- Roberge, Marc-André (1996). "Producing Evidence for the Beatification of a Composer: Sorabji's Deification of Busoni". Music Review 54 (Cambridge, England: Black Bear Press) (2). pp. 123–136. Retrieved 8 February 2020.
- Roberge, Marc-André (2019). Opus sorabjianum: The Life and Works of Kaikhosru Shapurji Sorabji (free download of the book from its presentation page on the Sorabji Resource Site). Retrieved 22 October 2019.
- Sorabji, Kaikhosru Shapurji (1953). Animadversions (unpublished essay).
