= List of longest non-repetitive piano pieces =

This page attempts to list the longest non-repetitive piano pieces along with approximate duration. The number of pages their scores cover and their formats are listed where available.

== Works that have been performed or recorded ==
| Piece | Composer | Approximate duration | Page count | Page size | Notes |
|---|---|---|---|---|---|
| Beatus Vir | Jacob Mashak | 11 hours | 53 (in proportional notation) | | A work for two pianos. Premiered by three pianists (including the composer), who played in rotation. |
| The Road | Frederic Rzewski | 10 hours | 539 (manuscript) | | Premiered by the composer, Ian Pace and several other pianists. |
| Symphonic Variations for Piano | Kaikhosru Shapurji Sorabji | 10 hours | 484 (manuscript) | A3 | Premiered by Yi-Chung Huang on the 4th of July 2026 at Montesilvano, Italy; with the US première on the 12th of July 2026 . Other pianists have recorded sections of the piece. |
| 100 Transcendental Studies | Kaikhosru Shapurji Sorabji | 8½ hours | 456 (manuscript) | A3 | The complete cycle of 100 études has been recorded by Fredrik Ullén. The études that have not been performed in public are Nos. 27, 33, 39, 42, 45–48, 51, 53–58, 60–64, 68, 74, 82, 87, 90, 91 and 93. |
| Sequentia cyclica super "Dies irae" ex Missa pro defunctis | Kaikhosru Shapurji Sorabji | 8½ hours | 335 (manuscript) | A3 | Premiered and recorded by Jonathan Powell. |
| Piano Sonata No. 5 (Opus archimagicum) | Kaikhosru Shapurji Sorabji | 6½ hours | 336 (manuscript) | A3 | Premiered in its full/complete form by Yi-Chung Huang on the 15th of February 2026 at PianoForte Studios, Chicago. Movements 8 and 9 from the 10-movement work were individually premiered by Tellef Johnson. |
| Inner Cities 1–14 | Alvin Curran | 6 hours | | | Premiered and recorded by Daan Vandewalle. |
| November | Dennis Johnson | 6 hours | 6 (manuscript) | | Premiered by the composer, recorded by R. Andrew Lee. |
| The Well-Tuned Piano | La Monte Young | 5-6 hours | | | Premiered and recorded by the composer. |
| The History of Photography in Sound | Michael Finnissy | 5½ hours | 365 (edition) | A3 | Premiered and recorded by Ian Pace. Performed by Mark Knoop. |
| Piano Symphony No. 6 (Symphonia claviensis) | Kaikhosru Shapurji Sorabji | 4¾ hours | 270 (manuscript) | A3 | Premiered by Jonathan Powell. |
| Piano Symphony No. 4 | Kaikhosru Shapurji Sorabji | 4½ hours | 240 (manuscript) | A3 | Premiered by Reinier van Houdt. |
| Opus clavicembalisticum | Kaikhosru Shapurji Sorabji | 4 hours | 253 (manuscript) | A3 | Premiered by the composer. Performed and recorded by Geoffrey Douglas Madge (Note: Madge's two recordings (released by Keytone Records and BIS Records respectively) were taken from live performances.) and John Ogdon. Performed by Jonathan Powell, Daan Vandewalle, Yi-Chung Huang and Hiroaki Ooï. Recorded by Eric Xi Xin Liang but in sections. |

== Works that have not been performed or recorded ==
| Piece | Composer | Approximate duration | Page count | Page size | Notes |
|---|---|---|---|---|---|
| For Clive Barker | Matthew Lee Knowles | 26 hours (1 day 2 hours) | 1,061 (manuscript) | A4 | |
| Piano Sonata No. 5 | Maurice Verheul | 7 hours 18 minutes | 441 (manuscript) | | |
| Piano Symphony No. 0 | Kaikhosru Shapurji Sorabji | 5½ hours | 333 (manuscript) | A3 | Planned to be premièred by Yi-Chung Huang. |
| Piano Symphony No. 1 (Tāntrik) | Kaikhosru Shapurji Sorabji | 4½ hours | 284 (manuscript) | A3 | |
| Piano Symphony No. 2 | Kaikhosru Shapurji Sorabji | 4½ hours | 248 (manuscript) | A3 | |

== See also ==
- Vexations
- As Slow as Possible
- Licht
- Kaikhosru Shapurji Sorabji
