= Stanchinsky =

Stanchinsky is a Russian surname. Notable bearers of the surname include:

- Alexei Stanchinsky (1888–1914), a Russian composer
- Vladimir Stanchinsky (1882–1942), a Russian ecologist
