= Piano Sonata No. 6 =

Piano Sonata No. 6 may refer to:

- Piano Sonata No. 6 (Beethoven)
- Piano Sonata No. 6 (Feinberg)
- Piano Sonata No. 6 (Mozart)
- Piano Sonata No. 6 (Prokofiev)
- Piano Sonata No. 6 (Scriabin)
