= Songs and Views of the Magnetic Garden =

Studio album by Alvin Curran
- Released: 1975/1993
- Genre: Experimental electronic, Minimalism
- Label: Catalyst

Songs and Views of the Magnetic Garden (1975/Catalyst 09026-61823-2 1993) is an album "performed, synthesized, recorded, and mixed by Alvin Curran." Liner notes by Tim Page and Alvin Curran.

- "This lush musical landscape, Alvin Curran's first multi-media solo work, intertwines singing and synthesizer, drones and overtones, bells, gamelans, and sounds of nature—a unique tapestry of sound that eloquently introduces a fanciful and original American composer."

Curran says that he was encouraged by then recent solo works by Terry Riley, La Monte Young, Charlemagne Palestine, and Simone Forti, while AllMusic says the album recalls early electronic work involving tape loops, echo, and feedback, and resembles composers Riley, Pauline Oliveros, and Steve Reich.

- "Curran interweaves the sounds of singing, nature, bells, gamelans, and synthesizers into what Page calls 'New Age with brains...he's one composer who can actually organize noise to the point that it becomes music.'"
- "Hearing his mid-1970s assemblages Songs And Views of the Magnetic Garden or Fiori Chiari Fiori Oscuri is like peering for the first time into Joseph Cornell's boxed collages."
- "Alvin Curran's 'Songs and Views of the Magnetic Garden' was a simmering stew of "found" sounds and minimalism."

The title will also be found as Songs and Views from the Magnetic Garden.

== Track listing ==
1. From a Room on the Piazza – Wind, high-tension wires, swallows, percussion, "molimo" (Mbuti trumpet)
2. Crystal Aires – Voice, ring modulator, glass chimes, water glugger, bees
3. Walked the Way Home – jaw harp, synthesizer, flugelhorn, dogs
4. Gli Scariolanti – Italian folksong sung by Margherita Berietti
5. On My Satin Harp – VCS3 synthesizer, kalimba, sounds of the sea
6. At Harmony Ranch – Whirling plastic tubes [or hoses], peepers (frogs), "Guido" the dog

Ananda N° 1 – 1975 – Italy

Ananda was an Italian label created in 1976 by the composers Alvin Curran, Roberto Laneri and Giacinto Scelsi. Each record was completely realized and produced by its authors.
