= Hans Winterberg =

Czech-German composer

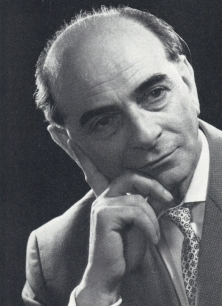
- Winterberg in 1965
- Born: 23 March 1901; Prague, Austria-Hungary
- Died: 10 March 1991 (aged 89); Stepperg, Bavaria, Germany
- Education: Prague Conservatory
- Occupations: Composer; Academic teacher
- Organizations: Richard Strauss Conservatory

Hans (in Czech known as Hanuš) Winterberg (23 March 1901 — 10 March 1991) was a Czech-German composer.

== Life ==
Born in Prague, Winterberg began music lessons at the age of nine with the concert pianist Therèse Wallerstein. He went on to study at the Academy of Music and Performing Arts in Prague (Composition with Fidelio F. Finke, and conducting with Alexander Zemlinsky) and at the Prague Conservatory, where he studied with Alois Hába. Gideon Klein was a fellow pupil during the terms of 1939/1940.

Hans Winterberg composed and worked for some time as vocal coach and repetiteur in Brno as well as for a number of other opera houses and ensembles.

He married Maria Maschat, a Roman Catholic, on 3 May 1930. The couple were divorced on 2 December 1944 in accordance with the stipulations of the Third Reich Marriage Laws.

Owing to his classification as a Jew, he was interned in Theresienstadt Ghetto on 26 January 1945. On 8. May 1945, he was freed and initially returned to Prague. From there, he composed a number of works until his immigration to Germany in 1947. Hans Winterberg was a Czech citizen and applied for a passport allowing him to travel. In correspondence found at the Ministry for Education addressed to the Foreign Office we read: "The Ministry confirms that the composer Hans Winterberg wishes to travel abroad in order to locate his manuscripts, which due to his internment in Theresienstadt, he sent to various addresses abroad. On behalf of the Ministry, it is advised to allow the applicant the full freedom to travel in all European countries with a valid passport."

He arrived initially in Riederau am Ammersee, before coming to Munich where he worked as an editor at Bavarian Radio and as a music teacher at the Richard Strauss Conservatory. He subsequently moved to Bad Tölz where he dedicated himself solely to composition. Despite his many unhappy experiences, he never gave up a belief in universality as a 'Bridge between the West (meaning the German) world and the East'. He saw himself as 'an artist belonging to the group of the unilaterally disadvantaged. Winterberg was also a painter. His final years were spent in Stepperg in Upper Bavaria, and he was eventually buried in Tölz, also in Upper Bavaria. Bad Tölz would be the location of his last fruitful years of musical creativity. Winterberg was a member of the Artists' Guild of Esslingen.

Winterberg died in Stepperg on 10 March 1991.

== Works ==
Winterberg's compositions are almost exclusively instrumental. He composed orchestral works, a number of chamber and piano solo works; music for radio plays as well as some vocal music. In the course of his creative life, he would be exposed to, and fall under the influence of Richard Wagner and Claude Debussy, as well as the Second Viennese School, the works of Schoenberg, Alexander Zemlinsky, Alois Hába, Béla Bartók, Igor Stravinsky, and perhaps also Paul Hindemith. Some of his music might be seen as a bridge between this later one and Bohuslav Martinů. He was inclined to assimilate and expand in his own manner all of these disparate elements while avoiding dodecaphonic compositional techniques.

As a result, he would follow his own stylistic instincts which were noted for their polyrhythmic characteristics. He was an acknowledged master of interweaving and condensing parallel rhythmic structures into a single acoustical sound-idea and effect. His ability to keep to motivic and thematic principals in the development of thematic-melodic ideas should also be noted in addition to his rhythmic and musical vitality. Nevertheless, one can find also a powerful pathos and deep emotional content in many of his slow movements, like it's the case in the Suites (for example in the Piano Suite 1927 or 1945), something remembering a bit similar features in Alban Berg's music. Polytonality in harmony is another side of his stylistic language.

Winterberg largely composed in expanded chromatic tonalities while avoiding both 12 tone and microtonal techniques. He referred to his first symphony 'Sinfonia dramatica' as a premonition of the catastrophe of the Second World War when it was first broadcast by Bavarian Radio in a performance conducted Karl List and the Bavarian Philharmonic.

Towards the end of 1954, and to great acclaim, the pianist Magda Rusy would perform a number of piano works by Winterberg in recitals in various countries including Austria and Yugoslavia.

Important premieres were his concerto for piano and orchestra performed by the pianist Agi Brand-Setterl on 13 November 1950 and three further premieres, his Sinfonia dramatica 17 January./18. 1949 in Mannheim, his suite for String Orchestra on 12 February 1952 and his Symphonic Epilogue on 13 June 1956 with the Munich Philharmonic, conducted by Fritz Rieger. The Winterberg music estate is housed at the Sudeten German Music Archive in Regensburg, though due to contractual conditions laid out upon handover of the estate to the Archive, it remains barred to scholars or musicians until 1 January 2031. This contract was deleted on 17 July 2015.

In November 2018, the first recording of chamber music by Hans Winterberg was issued by Toccata Classics in London.

=== List of works ===
==== Orchestral music ====
- Symphonische Tänze für Orchester: Stimmen der Nacht. Walzer (1935)
- Symphonische Suite für Orchester (1938)
- I. Symphonie (Sinfonia dramatica) (1936)
- II. Symphonie für Orchester (1946/49)
- I. Konzert für Klavier und Orchester (1948)
- II. Konzert für Klavier und Orchester (1950)
- III. Konzert für Klavier und Orchester (1968)
- IV. Konzert für Klavier und Orchester (1972)
- Suite für Streichorchester (1950)
- Symphonischer Epilog für großes Orchester (1952)
- Symphonische Reiseballade für großes Orchester (1958)
- Rhythmophonie 1966/67 für Orchester (1967)
- Symphonisches Rondo für Orchester (1970)
- Stationen 1974/75 (1975)
- Suite für Orchester (unvollendet) (1976)
- Arena – 20. Jahrhundert für Orchester (1979/80)

==== Ballet ====
- Bärenabenteuer – Ballettsuite 1962
- Ballade um Pandora – Ballettmusik für Orchester
- Moor-Mythos – Ballettmusik für Orchester

==== Chamber music ====
- Streichquartett 1936
- Streichquartett 1942
- Streichquartett 1957 / Neufassung 1970
- Streichquartett 1961
- Quartett für 2 Violinen, Viola, Violoncello, Klarinette B 1981
- Trio 1950 für Klarinette in B (Violine), Violoncello, Klavier
- Trio 1960 für Violine, Bratsche und Violoncello
- Suite für Violine und Klavier 1942
- Suite für Klarinette in B und Klavier 1944
- I. Suite für Trompete und Klavier 1945
- II. Suite für Trompete und Klavier 1952
- Suite für Flöte, Oboe, Klarinette, Fagott und Cembalo 1959
- Sudeten-Suite 1964 für Violine, Violoncello und Klavier
- Suite für Bläser 1972
- Rhapsodie für Posaune und Klavier 1951
- Suite für Viola und Klavier 1948
- Sonate für Violine und Klavier 1936
- Sonate für Violoncello und Klavier 1951
- Quintett für Flöte, Oboe, Klarinette, Fagott und Horn 1957
- Quintett für Trompete, Horn, Posaune, Pauke und Klavier 1951

==== Piano ====
- Klaviersonate I 1936
- Klaviersonate II 1941
- Klaviersonate III 1947
- Klaviersonate IV 1948
- Klaviersonate V 1950
- Suite für Klavier 1928
- Suite für Klavier "Theresienstadt 1945"
- Suite für Klavier 1950
- Suite für Klavier 1955
- Suite für Klavier 1956
- Suite für Klavier 1958
- Erinnerungen an Böhmen – Suite für Klavier
- Impressionistische Klaviersuite
- 7 neoimpressionistische Stücke im Zwölfton für Klavier
- Vier Intermezzi für Klavier 1929
- Toccata für Klavier 1926
- 12 Kinderstücke für Klavier zu zwei und vier Händen 1932
- Bärenabenteuer – Burleske für Klavier 1962
- Drei Klavierstücke 1984/85

==== Vocal ====
- Julian der Gastfreie nach Gustave Flaubert
- Dort und hier – 4 Lieder nach Franz Werfel für Sopran und Klavier
- Sieben Lieder nach Gedichten von Franz Werfel für Sopran und Klavier
- Zwei Lieder nach eigenen Texten für Sopran und Klavier
- Vier Lieder nach Gedichten von Luise.M.Pfeifer-Winterberg für Sopran und Klavier
- Vier Lieder nach Gedichten von Roderich Menzel für Bariton und Klavier
- Kleines Mädchen träumt – 7 Frauenchöre a cappella nach Emanuel Lesehrad (ins Deutsche übertragen von Hans Winterberg)
- Reminiszenzen – Lieder für Gesang und Orchester nach eigenen Texten 1932
- Mondlied eines Mädchens – nach Franz Werfel für Gesang u. Orchester 1933

==== Radio play ====
- Zu "Violetts Träume" von Heinz Kohlhaas
- und "Robinson soll nicht sterben" von F. Forster

==== Works of light entertainment ====
with pseudonym Jan Iweer

- Nymphenburger Fontänen für Orchester
- Russische Rhapsodie für Orchester
- Arietta 1963 für Klavier und Gesang
- Trepak für Klavier
- Erinnerung an Prag für Bariton und Orchester Text: L.M.Pfeifer-Winterberg

==== Teaching material ====
- Musiktheorie

==== Radio broadcast of Bavarian Radio: 1950–1981 ====
- Arena 20. Jahrhundert für Sinfonieorchester

Symphonieorchester Graunke (1981), Leitung: Kurt Graunke

- Ballade um Pandora. Eine choreographische Vision

Münchner Philharmoniker (1959), Conductor: Rudolf Alberth

- Konzert für Klavier und Orchester

Agi Brand-Setterl (Klavier), Münchner Philharmoniker (1950), Dirigent: Fritz Rieger

- Konzert für Klavier und Orchester Nr. 2

Liesel Heidersdorf (Klavier), Münchner Philharmoniker (1952), Dirigent: Fritz Rieger

- Konzert für Klavier und Orchester Nr. 3

Gitti Pirner (Klavier), Münchner Philharmoniker (1970), Dirigent: Jan Koetsier

- Sinfonie Nr. 1

Populartitel: Sinfonia drammatica, Münchner Philharmoniker (1955), Dirigent: Karl List

- Sinfonie Nr. 2 für großes Orchester

Münchner Philharmoniker (1952), Dirigent: Jan Koetsier

- Stationen 1974/1975

Bamberger Symphoniker (1975), Dirigent: Rainer Miedel

- Streichquartett

Koeckert Quartett (1951), Rudolf Koeckert (Violine), Willi Buchner (Violine), Oskar Riedl (Viola), Josef Merz (Violoncello)

- Streichquartett 1957 (Neufassung 1970)

Sonnleitner-Quartett (1971), Fritz Sonnleitner (Violine), Ludwig Baier (Violine), Siegfried Meinecke (Viola), Fritz Kiskalt (Viloncello)

- Sudetensuite für Violine, Violoncello und Klavier (1966)

Gerhard Seitz (Violine), Walter Nothas (Violoncello), Günter Louegk (Klavier)

- Symphonische Reiseballade

Bamberger Symphoniker (1963), Dirigent: Joseph Strobl

- Symphonischer Epilog

Münchner Philharmoniker (1956), Dirigent: Fritz Rieger

- Trio für Violine, Viola und Violoncello

Streichtrio (1962), Angelika Rümann (Violine), Franz Schessl (Viola), Wilhelm Schneller (Violoncello)

- 4 Lieder für Sopran und Klavier (1973)

Textdichterin: Luise Pfeifer-Winterberg, Ich ging heute abend, Leise murmelt der Regen, Jede Stunde ohne dich, Wie tobte der Sturm, Edith Urbanczyk (Sopran), Hortense Wieser (Klavier)

- Leise murmelt der Regen für Sopran und Klavier (1981)

Textdichterin: Luise Pfeifer-Winterberg, Irmgard Lampart (Sopran), Ernst Mauss (Klavier)

- Hörspiel: Robinson soll nicht sterben (1961)
- Hörspiel: Frau Violetts Träume (1960)

== Awards ==
- 1963 Sudetendeutscher Kulturpreis
- 1964 Anerkennungspreis zum Johann-Wenzel-Stamitz-Preis

== Sources ==
- Die Sudeten-Deutschen, Fritz Peter Habel, Volume 1 – p. 271, Advanced Edition 2002
- Music archive Künstlergilde e.V. Bonn, 29f., Heinrich Simbriger, Letter to Sir Cecil Parott 5 January 1975
- Catalogue of works of contemporary composers from the German eastern territories, Heinrich Simbriger 1955 Supplements
- Klaus Peter Koch. Winterberg, Hans. Sudetendeutsches Musikinstitut (Editor). Lexikon zur Deutschen Musikkultur. Böhmen – Mähren – Sudetenschlesien. Munich 2000. Column 2981–2983.
- Sudetendeutsche Zeitung 14 June 1991
- Sudetendeutscher Kulturalmanach, Editor Josef Heinrich, Delp´sche Verlagsbuchhandlung Munich, Heinrich Simbriger: Composer Hans Winterberg – Recognition Award for music (Composition) 1963
- Historical archive of the Bayerischer Rundfunk (Bavarian Broadcasting Corporation, Munich, Germany)
- 100 Years Munich Philharmonic Orchestra – Gabriele E. Meyer 1994

== Accompanying literature ==
- musica reanimata-Mitteilungen Nr.81 Oktober 2013 – Peter Kreitmeir: Mein Großvater, der Komponist Hans Winterberg
- Biographia Judaica Bohemiae – Rudolf M. Wlaschek 1995
- Juden in Böhmen – Rudolf M. Wlaschek 1990
- Juden im Sudetenland – Ackermann-Gemeinde 2000, S. 236 Rabbiner Löwy Winterberg
