= Alexei Stanchinsky =

Russian composer

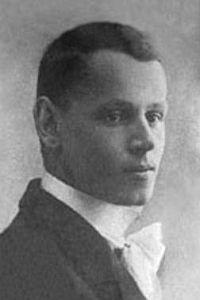
Alexei Vladimirovich Stanchinsky

Alexei Vladimirovich Stanchinsky (Russian: Алексей Владимирович Станчинский; 9 March (OS) / 21 March 1888 – 25 September (OS) / 6 October 1914) was a composer from the Russian Empire.

From a young age, Stanchinsky was a gifted musician, composing and performing his first works at the age of six years. At the age of 16, he continued to develop his skills by taking lessons from music educators such as Josef Lhévinne and Konstantin Eiges for piano, and Nikolai Zhilyayev and Alexander Gretchaninov for counterpoint, harmony, and composition. At the age of 19, Stanchinsky entered the Moscow Conservatory to continue his musical studies with Taneyev and Igumnov to assist his musical growth.

Stanchinsky had always shown great promise as a musician even at a young age, but was often viewed as “unstable” and a victim of his own nerves. This became very prominent when his father died in 1910, as Alexei became quite delusional and suffered from this state for many years. After a brief hiatus from music, Stanchinsky returned to his roots by gathering folk tunes for a personal collection and eventually returned to the conservatory life-style by studying with his colleagues again. However, his life would never again be what it was.

In October 1914, he was found dead next to a stream near Logachyovo after wandering the countryside. His death is still a mystery, as details were never revealed about his last days.

== Biography ==
=== Early life ===
Alexei Stanchinsky was born on 9 March 1888, in Obolsunovo, Vladimir, Russia. His brother was the ecologist Vladimir Stanchinsky. At the age of six, it was apparent that Alexei was an unusually talented musician as he was already performing piano works of the masters. Stanchinsky and his parents moved to Logachyovo (now Kositcheno) when he was 11, as a source of inspiration for his musical gift. Logachyovo was the village made famous by Mikhail Glinka, as he spent many years there gathering folk songs. Due to his health, Stanchinsky could not live in the city comfortably, so he often commuted to Moscow for studying purposes. Due to his illness and inability to travel at times, his lessons with Sergei Taneyev were often done by correspondence. This is one of the first recorded accounts of musical work being performed by correspondence rather than face to face. During 1904-1907 that Stanchinsky's talents continued to grow, and he was fully accepted into the Moscow Conservatory in 1907.

=== Later years ===
During Stanchinsky's time at the Moscow Conservatory he excelled in all facets of his studies. However, after one major event all his work would come crashing down before him. Stanchinsky was diagnosed with the disease Dementia praecox, apparent from a wide variety of symptoms including hallucinations and fits of rage. He spent most of 1908 in a medical clinic where, despite periods of lucidity, he was eventually described as incurable and discharged. In 1910 his father died, which was the ultimate derailment for Alexei. He eventually re-entered the Moscow Conservatory, and during this time it seemed that he was back to his normal self, as he was composing, playing, and working with his colleagues once more. He spent the next few years further developing his skills and his own unique sound. During the years before his death he had moved on from traditional styles of composition and began to discover his own creative musical voice, rather than mimicking those of past composers.

After much of his work was finished and he seemed to have returned to a sense of normalcy, he was asked by his teacher Taneyev to partake in a recital along with fellow composers of his time. This, the only recital that Stanchinsky ever took part in, was held in Moscow Conservatory on 2 March 1914. His works were well received, and it briefly looked like he had established himself as a member of the Russian music community. According to musicologist Barrie Martyn, in April he gave Nikolai Medtner the pieces that were performed at the concert, and in May he was hoping to stay with him during the summer holiday for further discussions, though this did not happen. His revelation to the world was short lived, as a few months later he was found dead near a stream near Logachyovo, close to a family friend's estate. He was only 26 years old when he died. He was buried in Smolensk.

=== Early death ===
Stanchinsky drowned outside Logachyovo, Russia, but it is not known if he intentionally took his own life. As a child, he was often sickly and had to forgo trips to Moscow and other major cities. According to Elena Bai's story, Alexey was supposed to come to her on September 22, 1914. Stanchinsky's mother was against this meeting, and did not let Alexei go. According to Vera Glinka (the daughter of Mikhail Glinka's cousin, with whom Alexei was associated with friendly and creative interests), who was visiting, Stanchinsky did not obey and went into the night. As his sister Lydia Stanchinskaya wrote, Alexei was found the next day "... dead on the bank of the river 15 miles from Logachev, in wet clothes. According to the mother, the paramedic who arrived at the scene determined death from heart paralysis." Apparently, Stanchinsky had to wade the river, September was cold, and his body could not stand it (Stanchinsky had a weak heart).

== Inspirations ==
Alexei Stanchinsky is often viewed as a revolutionary Russian composer, but there are many aspects of his work that can be seen as a sort of tribute to those musicians that he admired. His first piano sonatas have a sort of texture that resembles the works of Scriabin and Grieg, and in many other works there is a simplicity to them gathered from folksongs that heavily resemble those of Mussorgsky. After his years at the conservatory he began to wander away from the composers of the past and push forward to new ideas that were still being hinted at by 19th century composers.

In his second Piano Sonata he began exploring asymmetrical time signatures such as 11/8, and he fully explores the tonality of his works, while relying on harmonic and melodic tension derived from the complete use of octatonic, whole-tone, as well as diatonic and modal collections. He reciprocated these concepts by featuring Russian folk songs as the melodies in his music, quite similar to the works of Stravinsky during the same time frame. Near his last years, his music had reached a peak of its own, combining what he had learned and creating music that was very polyphonic at its base form. It is acclaimed that Russian music had suffered a great blow following his death.

== List of known works ==
- Two Mazurkas for piano (1905-7)
1. Allegro in D♭ major
2. Allegretto in G♯ minor
- Three Sketches for piano (1905–07)

[Originally composed as part of Twelve Sketches Op. 1]

1. Allegro marcato in C major
2. Allegretto in A minor
3. Presto tempestoso in C major
- Sonata in E♭ minor for piano (1906)
- Nocturne for piano (1907)
- Etude in G minor for piano (1907)

Allegro patetico

- Etude in A♭ major for piano (1907)

Animato assai

- Three Preludes for piano (1907)
1. Lento in C♯ minor
2. Con moto in D major
3. Adagio in E♭ minor
- Canon in B minor for piano (1908)
- Prelude in E major for piano (1908)
- Prelude in Lydian mode for piano (1908)
- Prelude and Fugue in G minor for piano (1909)
- Trio for piano, violin and cello (1907–10)
- Three Preludes for piano (1907–10)
1. in G minor
2. in F minor
3. in B major
- Ten Scottish Songs to poems by Robert Burns (1907–10)
- Twelve Sketches Op. 1 for piano (1911)
1. Moderato in C minor
2. Presto in G minor
3. Vivace in D major
4. Lento cantabile in A minor
5. Allegro in A♭ major
6. Andante epico in Dorian mode
7. Adagio teneramente in C♭ major
8. Molto vivace in G♯ minor
9. Largamente in D minor
10. Con moto in A major
11. Allegro con spirito in F♯ minor
12. Presto assai in C major
- Variations in A minor for piano (1911)
- Five Preludes for piano (1907–12)
1. Andante in C minor
2. Lento espressivo in F minor
3. Presto in B♭ minor
4. Animato in B minor
5. Largo in C minor
- Piano Sonata No. 1 in F major (1911–12)
- Allegro Op. 2 for piano (1912)
- Piano Sonata No. 2 in G major (1912)
- Four Canon-Preludes for piano (1913)
1. Allegro risoluto in C major
2. Vivace in G major
3. Andante sostenuto in E mixolydian
4. Veloce in E♭ minor/G♭ major “Canon a 2 voci per l’aumentazione”

There are other works that are credited yet were left unfinished or destroyed by Stanchinsky due to his brash nature in his composition lessons, and his later desire to create his own musical voice. Much of what has survived was credited to his colleagues and more importantly Zhilyayev and Taneyev for preventing the mass burning of his works during their lessons with Stanchinsky.
