= John Ogdon =

English pianist and composer (1937–1989)

- Ogdon, in the 1970s
- Born: 27 January 1937; Mansfield Woodhouse, Nottinghamshire, England
- Died: 1 August 1989 (aged 52); London, England
- Education: Royal Northern College of Music
- Occupations: Pianist; Composer
- Organizations: New Music Manchester

John Andrew Howard Ogdon (27 January 1937 – 1 August 1989) was an English pianist and composer.

== Biography ==
=== Career ===
Ogdon was born on 27 January 1937 in Mansfield Woodhouse, Nottinghamshire; his family moved to Manchester when he was eight. He attended the Manchester Grammar School, before studying at the Royal Northern College of Music (formerly The Royal Manchester College of Music) between 1953 and 1957, where his fellow students under Richard Hall included Harrison Birtwistle, Alexander Goehr, Elgar Howarth and Peter Maxwell Davies. Together they formed New Music Manchester, a group dedicated to the performances of serial and other modern works. His tutor there was Claud Biggs. As a boy he had studied with Iso Elinson and after leaving college, he further studied with Gordon Green, Denis Matthews, Dame Myra Hess, and Egon Petri—the last in Basel, Switzerland.

He won first prize at the London Liszt Competition in 1961 and consolidated his growing international reputation by winning another first prize at the International Tchaikovsky Competition in Moscow in 1962, jointly with Vladimir Ashkenazy.

Ogdon was able to play most pieces at sight and had committed a huge range of pieces to memory. He intended to record the complete piano works of Sergei Rachmaninoff, a feat which would constitute about six full-length albums, but only recorded about half of them. The recordings were released in 2001. He recorded all ten Scriabin sonatas in 1971. Ogdon was also a formidable exponent of the works of Alkan and Busoni. In more familiar repertoire, he revealed deep musical sensibilities, always buttressed by a colossal technique. He also recorded a number of duo-piano works with his wife Brenda Lucas, also known as Brenda Lucas Ogdon.

On 2 February 1969, on British television, he gave the first modern performance of Edward Elgar's Concert Allegro, Op. 46. The piece was never published and the manuscript had long been believed lost, but it came to light in 1968. Ogdon and Diana McVeigh developed a performing version of the piece from Elgar's manuscript, which was full of corrections, deletions and additions. Between 1976 and 1980 Ogdon was Professor of Music (Piano) at Indiana University. He completed four comprehensive tours of Southern Africa to enthusiastic acclaim between 1968 and 1976 and dedicated a composition to his tour organizer Hans Adler.

His own compositions number more than 200, and include four operas, two large works for orchestra, three cantatas, songs, chamber music, a substantial amount of music for solo piano, and two piano concertos, the first of which he recorded. The majority of his music was composed for the piano. These include 50 transcriptions of works by composers as diverse as Stravinsky, Palestrina, Mozart, Satie and Wagner. He also made piano arrangements of songs by Cole Porter, Jerome Kern and George Gershwin and he wrote unaccompanied sonatas for violin, flute and cello. A planned symphony based on the works of Herman Melville, and a comic opera were left unfinished. The original manuscripts of many of Ogdon's compositions are deposited in the Royal Northern College of Music Library.

=== Mental breakdown ===
Ogdon's health was good, and his physical constitution was strong, as his wife often recalled in her biography. Regarded as a "gentle giant", known and loved for his kindness and generosity, he had tremendous energy. In 1973, he experienced a sudden severe mental breakdown. His illness was initially diagnosed as schizophrenia, but later changed to manic depression (now referred to as bipolar disorder). Either condition may have been inherited from his father, who suffered several psychotic episodes. Ogdon spent some time in the Maudsley Hospital in London, and in general needed more nursing than it was possible to provide while touring. Nevertheless, he was reported to maintain three hours' practice a day on the hospital's piano.

In 1983, after emerging from hospital, he played at the opening of the Royal Concert Hall in Nottingham. In 1988 he released a five-disc recording of Sorabji's Opus clavicembalisticum. He died in London on 1 August 1989 of pneumonia, brought on by undiagnosed diabetes.

=== Legacy ===
His wife Brenda, along with writer Michael Kerr, wrote a biography of her life with him in 1981, and released a second edition in 1989, shortly before his death. Another biography by Charles Beauclerk, 15th Duke of St Albans, Piano Man, was published in March 2014. One of John Ogdon's doctoral students at Indiana University, Edna Chun, describes her experiences in studying with John Ogdon in Transformational Music Teaching (2023).

In the BBC film about his life, Virtuoso, based on the biography, Ogdon was played by Alfred Molina, who won a Best Actor award from the Royal Television Society for the performance. The production interpreted Ogdon's illness as manic depression rather than schizophrenia, since he had responded much better to treatment for the former condition. Brenda Ogdon also recalled being informed that his obsessive musical work could have been interpreted as a symptom of manic depression.

In June 2014 John Ogdon: Living with Genius, directed by Zoe Dobson, was broadcast on BBC Four. The programme was followed by John Ogdon: A Musical Tribute featuring piano performances by Peter Donohoe, including Ogdon's own Theme and Variations.

In 1990, Gordon Rumson, another devoted advocate for Sorabji's music, composed the piano piece Threnody for John Ogdon. Organist Kevin Bowyer commissioned and premiered Alistair Hinton's organ work Pansophiae for John Ogdon (Hinton is the curator of the Sorabji Archive and worked with Ogdon on the recording of Sorabji's Opus clavicembalisticum).

Ogdon is survived by his daughter and son, Annabel and Richard Ogdon.

== Discography ==
A reasonably comprehensive discography can be found on the website of the John Ogdon Foundation reproduced from The Gramophone Spring 1998 edition as compiled by Michael Glover. However, a small number of other recordings have since come to light:

- Ludwig van Beethoven
  - Piano Sonata No. 32 in C minor, Op. 111
    - Recorded in the BBC studios, London, 5 November 1963
  - Concerto for Piano and Orchestra No. 5 in E♭ major, Op. 73
    - Recorded with the BBC Northern Symphony Orchestra and Jascha Horenstein
  - 32 Variations on an original theme in C minor, WoO 80
- Sir Arthur Bliss
  - Piano Concerto in B-flat, BBC Symphony Orchestra under the composer, 2 August 1966, Bliss birthday concert
- Johannes Brahms
  - Concerto for Piano and Orchestra No. 2 in B♭ major, Op. 83
    - Recorded in the BBC Studios, Manchester, 16 September 1966 with the Hallé Orchestra and John Barbirolli
- Percy Grainger
  - Transcription of Lullaby from Tribute to Foster
    - Recorded at the 1966 Aldeburgh Festival
  - Shepherd's Hey
    - Recorded at the 1966 Aldeburgh Festival
  - Zanzibar Boat Song
    - Recorded at the 1966 Aldeburgh Festival with Benjamin Britten and Viola Tunnard
- Alun Hoddinott
  - Sonata No. 3, Op. 40
    - Recorded at the 23rd Cheltenham Festival
- Franz Liszt
  - Concerto for Piano and Orchestra No. 1 in E♭ major, S.124
    - Recorded in the Colston Hall, Bristol, 20 September 1967
  - Mephisto Waltz No. 1 (Der Tanz in der Dorfschenke), S.514
    - Recorded in the Queen Elizabeth Hall, London, 24 April 1969
  - Grande Fantaisie de bravoure sur La Clochette (La campanella) de Paganini, S.420
    - Recorded in the BBC studios, London, 20 January 1970
  - Grande Etude S.137, No.11 (1837 version of Etude d'exécution transcendente S.139, No. 11 Harmonies du soir)
    - Recorded in the BBC studios, London, 20 January 1970
- Tilo Medek
  - "Battaglia alla Turca" for two pianos, from Mozart's Rondo alla Turca
    - Recorded live in London in 1974 with John Lill
- Nikolai Medtner
  - Piano Sonata in C minor, Op. 25, No.1 (Fairy Tale)
    - Recorded in 1971 for the BBC
  - Piano Sonata in E minor, Op. 25, No.2 (Night Wind)
    - Recorded in 1972?
- Franz Schubert
  - Piano Sonata in C minor, D.958
    - Recorded in 1972 for the BBC
- Dmitri Shostakovich
  - Piano Sonata No. 2 in B minor, Op. 61
    - Recorded in 1971 for the BBC
- Igor Stravinsky
  - Sonata for two pianos (1943/1944)
    - Recorded at the 23rd Cheltenham Festival with Brenda Lucas
  - Concerto for two solo pianos (1935)
    - Recorded at the 23rd Cheltenham Festival with Brenda Lucas

== Recordings ==
- Piano Music of Carl Nielsen (RCA Red Seal LSC-3002) 1968
- Rachmaninoff: Piano Sonatas (RCA Red Seal LSC-3024) 1968
- Beethoven: Hammerklavier Sonata (RCA Red Seal LSC-3123) 1969
- Mennin: Piano Concerto; Yardumian, Passacaglia, Recitative and Fugue - Royal Philharmonic Orchestra, Igor Buketoff (RCA Red Seal LSC-3243) 1971
- Alkan: Concerto for Solo Piano (RCA Red Seal LSC-3192) 1972
- Liszt: Hungarian Rhapsody No.2, others (RCA Red Seal SX-2037) 1972
- Ferruccio Busoni: Fantasia contrappuntistica, Fantasia nach J. S. Bach, and Toccata. Altarus AIR-CD-9074
- Ferruccio Busoni: Piano Concerto (with the Royal Philharmonic Orchestra; Daniell Revenaugh, conductor). EMI Classics 94637246726
- Kaikhosru Sorabji: Opus clavicembalisticum. Altarus AIR-CD9075
