= Koeckert Quartet =

German string quartet

The Koeckert Quartet was a German string quartet.

== Origin and activity ==
It was founded in 1939 under the name of the "Sudeten German Quartet", later renamed the "Prague String Quartet". It consisted of members of the German Philharmonic Orchestra in Prague (1939–1945), which had been founded by order of Joseph Goebbels. In 1947 it took the name Koeckert Quartet, after its first violinist Rudolf Koeckert. (1913–2005). Since 1949 the quartet resided in Munich, and the members were soloists of the Bavarian Radio Symphony Orchestra. In the 1950s and 1960s, it shaped the musical life of the city of Munich alongside other ensembles, from where it started concert tours to North America, South Africa and all major European cities. It was thus one of the leading German string quartets of international standing. The quartet existed under the name "Koeckert Quartet" until 1982, when it was succeeded by the "Joachim Koeckert Quartet"; its first violinist, Rudolf-Joachim Koeckert, is the son of Rudolf Koeckert; the position of second violin was taken over by Antonio Spiller. Since 1982 this ensemble has premiered most of Karl Höller's important chamber music works, as well as works by Günter Bialas, Alberto Ginastera, Paul Hindemith, Ernst Krenek and Winfried Zillig. The Joachim Koeckert Quartet existed until 1992).

== Lineup ==
Members of the quartet were:

- Rudolf Koeckert (1st violin) (until 1982)
- Willi Buchner (14 October 1910 Schwarzau / Lower Austria) (until 1965), Rudolf-Joachim Koeckert (10 April 1941 Prague) (2nd violin)
- Oskar Riedl (4 July 1912 Graslitz / Bohemia) (until 1975), Franz Schessl (viola)
- Josef Merz (20 August 1911 Gumplitz / Bohemia) (until 1976), Helmar Stiehler (cello)

== Discography (by Deutsche Grammophon) ==
- Anton Bruckner, String quintet F major (with Georg Schmid, viola), mono (DGG 18.042)
- Robert Schumann, String Quartet, Op. 41, No. 2, and Bedřich Smetana, String Quartet No. 1 (1959)
- Felix Mendelssohn, String Quartet Op. 12 (1960)
- Franz Schubert, String Quartet No 14 (Death and the Maiden) (Rudolf Koeckert, Willi Buchner, Oskar Riedl, Josef Merz) Decca DL 9567, (1953)
- Franz Schubert, Trout Quintet D 667, with Christoph Eschenbach, piano (1964)
- Joseph Haydn, String Quartet Hob. III:72 (1969)
- Carl Orff, Catulli Carmina, with choir and orchestra of the Deutsche Oper Berlin, conductor: Eugen Jochum (1970)
- Robert Schumann, String Quartet Op. 41, Nos. 1 and 3 (1985)
- Edvard Grieg, String Quartet (1990 and 1992)
