= Brenda Lucas Ogdon =

English concert pianist (1935–2025)

Brenda Lucas Ogdon (23 November 1935 – 14 December 2025) was an English concert pianist. She was known for her solo work and for her long-standing duet partnership with her husband, the pianist John Ogdon. Brenda Lucas Ogdon died on 14 December 2025, at the age of 90.
