= Geoffrey Douglas Madge =

Australian classical pianist and composer

Geoffrey Douglas Madge (born 3 October 1941) is an Australian classical pianist and composer.

== Biography ==
Madge was born in Adelaide and took his first piano lessons at the age of eight. He later won the 1963 ABC Concerto and Vocal Competition. After winning this competition he left for Europe in 1963 and settled in the Netherlands. He was appointed professor of piano at the Royal Conservatory in The Hague.

Madge is known for performing long and arduous works. He was the first to record Leopold Godowsky's Studies on Chopin's Études, once described as "the most impossibly difficult things ever written for the piano". He has given six complete performances of Sorabji's Opus clavicembalisticum, one of the longest and most difficult works ever written for the piano. In 1982, 52 years after Sorabji premiered the work, Madge gave the work its second public performance. Two of Madge's performances of the work have been released commercially.

In 1979, he gave the first complete performance of Nikos Skalkottas's 32 Piano Pieces.
