= Egon Kornauth =

Austrian composer and music teacher (1891–1959)

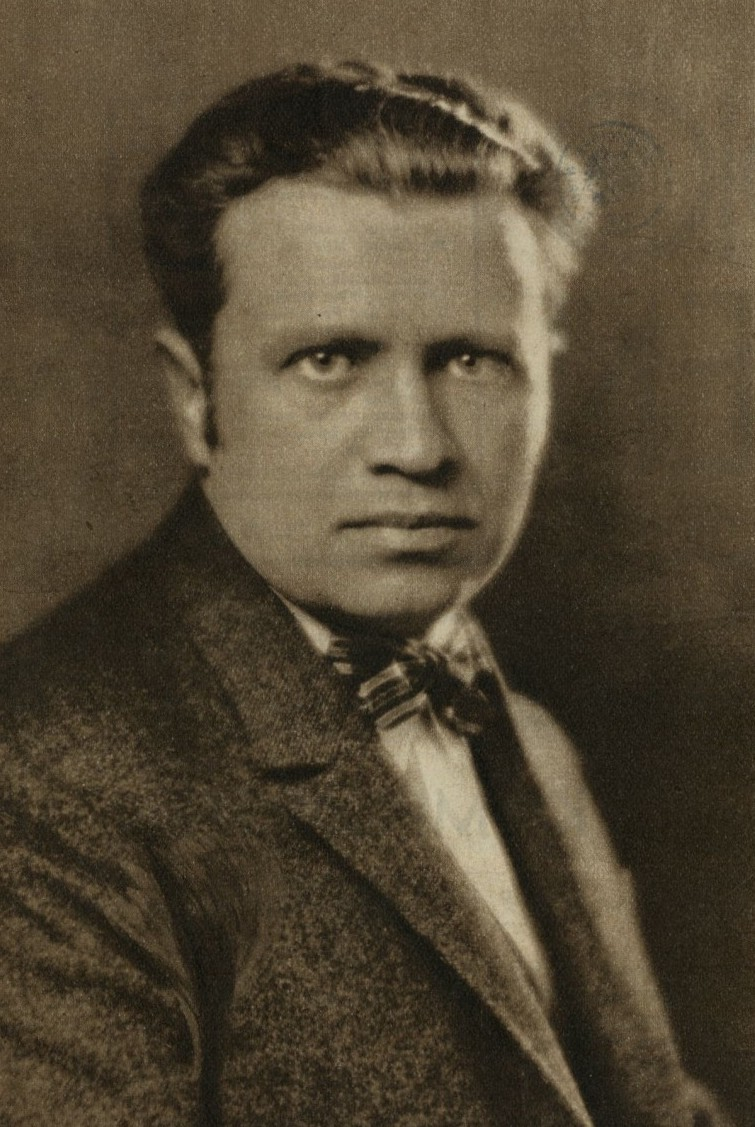
- Kornauth in 1933
- Born: 14 May 1891; Olmütz, Moravia, Austria
- Died: 28 October 1959 (aged 68)
- Occupations: Composer and music teacher

Egon Kornauth (14 May 1891 – 28 October 1959) was an Austrian composer and music teacher. Kornauth was among the most important 20th-century composers active in Salzburg.

== Life ==
Kornauth was born in Olmütz, Moravia. A cellist and pianist from his youth, he went in 1909 to Vienna, where he studied with Robert Fuchs, Guido Adler, Franz Schreker (with whom he quarrelled) and Franz Schmidt.

After teaching music theory at Vienna University from 1919, Kornauth embarked on an international career as pianist, accompanist and conductor that took him to Indonesia (1926-9) and to South America (1934-5). In 1940 he resumed a teaching career in war-time Vienna and Salzburg. He joined the Nazi-sponsored Reichsmusikkammer, but continued to support his teacher Adler, who was held under house arrest as a Jew, until the latter's death in 1941. In post-war Austria, Kornauth became director of the Salzburg Mozarteum (1946-1947), and was elected to the Austrian Arts Senate in 1954. He died in Vienna in 1959.

Kornauth composed extensively and won a number of prizes including the Austrian State Prize (1913) (for his Viola Sonata op.3), the Gustav Mahler Foundation prize (1919), and the Austrian Würdigungspreis (1951). His style was however conventional; when the English composer Humphrey Searle visited Vienna in the 1930s he was displeased to find that the only modern music played by the main orchestras was that of Schmidt "or lesser composers like ... Kornauth." Kornauth himself recognised in his 1958 autobiography that "epigonism was inherent in my personality." Most of Kornauth's output consists of lieder, chamber music and piano pieces, but there are also five orchestral suites amongst other larger scale pieces. The musicologist Cliff Eisen described Kornauth as among the most important 20th-century composers active in Salzburg.

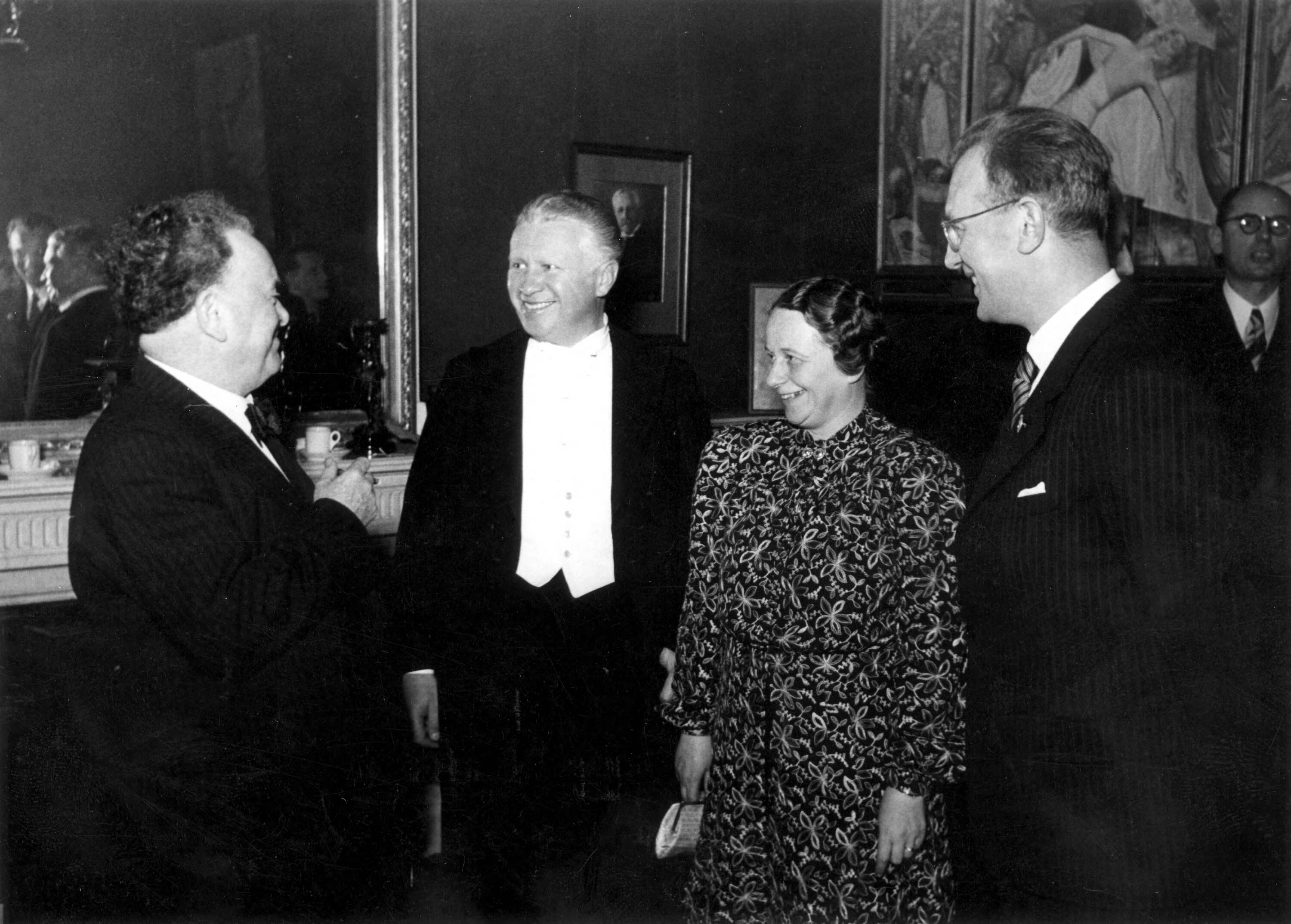
Willem Mengelberg, Kornauth and Arthur Seyss-Inquart, c. 1940

A recording of some of Kornauth's piano works by Jonathan Powell was released by Toccata Classics in 2013.

== Selected works ==
Orchestral

- Orchestral Suite No. 1 (Sinfonische Suite Nr. 1) Aus der Jugendzeit, Op. 7 (1913; revised 1928)
- Elegie auf den Tod eines Freundes (Elegy on the Death of a Friend) (1916); published 1932
- Sinfonische Ouvertüre (Symphonic Overture), Op. 13
- Orchestral Suite No. 2, Op. 20 (published 1925)
- Musik for string orchestra, Op. 25a (1920); after the String Sextet
- Orchestral Suite No. 3 (Sinfonische Suite Nr. 2), Op. 35 (1931; revised 1937); also for Piano Quintet, Op. 35a
- Orchestral Suite No. 5 Romantische Suite, Op. 40 (1936)
- Orchestral Suite No. 4 (Sinfonische Suite Nr. 4), Op. 42 (1938)
- Irish Tune from County Derry for string orchestra (or string quintet)

Concertante

- Notturno (Andante) for viola and chamber orchestra, Op. 3b (1912); movement II from the Viola Sonata
- Ballade for cello and orchestra, Op. 17 (1917)
- Konzertstück (Concert Piece) for violin and chamber orchestra (or piano), Op. 19 (1917)

Chamber music

- Sonata in C♯ minor for viola and piano, Op. 3 (1912); also for clarinet and piano (1914); movement II, Notturno, also for viola and chamber orchestra
- Sonata for clarinet and piano, Op. 5
- 2 Vortragsstücke: Scherzo und Andante (2 Concert Pieces) for violin and piano, Op. 5b (published 1932)
- Sonata in E minor for violin and piano, Op. 9 (1914)
- Burleske in E minor for flute and piano (or orchestra), Op. 11 (1916)
- Kleine Abendmusik for 2 violins, viola and cello, Op. 14 (1915)
- Sonata (Sonatina) in D major for violin and piano, Op. 15 (1916)
- Piano Quartet in C minor, Op. 18 (1917)
- String Sextet in A minor for 2 violins, 2 violas and 2 cellos, Op. 25 (1918–1919); also for string orchestra
- String Quartet in G minor, Op. 26 (1920)
- Piano Trio in B minor, Op. 27 (1921)
- Sonata for cello and piano, Op. 28 (published 1924)
- String Quintet for 2 violins, 2 violas and cello, Op. 30 (1923)
- Kammermusik (Chamber Music), Nonet for flute, oboe, clarinet, horn, 2 violins, viola, cello and double bass, Op. 31 (1924); for wind quintet and string quartet, Op. 31a (1924); Dectet for wind and string quintets, Op. 31b
- Klarinettenquintett (Clarinet Quintet) in F♯ minor for clarinet, 2 violins, viola and cello, Op. 33 (1930)
- Piano Quintet in F♯ minor, Op. 35a (1931); after the Orchestral Suite No. 3
- Kleine Hausmusik (Little Chamber Music; Petite composition facile) for 2 violins, viola and cello, Op. 41a (1939); also for piano, Op. 41b
- Trio-Suite for violin, cello (or viola) and piano, Op. 45 (1948)

1. Rhapsodie
2. Valse triste
3. Canon I
4. Canon II
5. Canzonetta

- Valse triste for viola and piano (1948); from Trio-Suite, Op. 45
- Sonatina for violin (or flute, or viola) and piano, Op. 46 (1952)
- 3 Stücke (3 Pieces) for cello (or viola) and piano, Op. 47 (1954)

1. Elegie
2. Romanze
3. Dumka

- Irish Tune from County Derry for string quintet (or string orchestra)

Piano

- 5 Klavierstücke (5 Piano Pieces), Op. 2 (1912)
- Sonata in A♭ major, Op. 4 (1912)
- Fantasie (Phantasie), Op. 10 (1915)
- 3 Klavierstücke (3 Piano Pieces), Op. 23 (1920); also for piano 4-hands, Op. 23a

1. Präludium
2. Improvisation
3. Walzer

- Kleine Suite (Little Suite), Op. 29 (1923)

1. Präludium
2. Intermezzo
3. Barcarole
4. Ländler
5. Notturno
6. Walzer
7. Finale

- 4 Klavierstücke (4 Piano Pieces), Op. 32 (1926); also for piano 4-hands, Op. 32a

1. In Memoriam
2. Capriccio
3. Notturno
4. Rondo-Burleske

- Präludium und Passacaglia (Prelude and Passacaglia), Op. 43 (1939)
- 5 Klavierstücke (5 Piano Pieces), Op. 44 (1940)

1. Präludium
2. Intermezzo
3. Capriccio
4. Mährische Ballade
5. Walzer

- 3 Canons (published 1951)

Vocal

- 6 Lieder (6 Songs) for voice and piano, Op. 1 (1911); Nos. 1, 4 and 6 also for voice and chamber orchestra

1. Ganz im Geheimen; words by Franz von Königsbrun-Schaup
2. Landsknechtlied; words by Heinrich von Reder
3. Leid; words by Maria Stona
4. Frühlingsruhe; words by Ludwig Uhland
5. Mein und Dein; words by J. G. Fischer
6. In der Kirschenblüth'; words by J. G. Fischer

- Erntelied von anno 1914 for medium voice and piano (1914); words by Richard Smekal
- 4 Gesänge (4 Songs) for high voice and piano, Op. 8 (1914); also for voice and chamber orchestra

1. Zu spät; words by Friedrich Theodor Vischer
2. Traumleben; words by Julius Hart
3. O gib mir nicht den Mund!; words by Ernst Goll
4. Der stille Tag; words by Robert Hohlbaum

- 8 Gesänge nach Richard Smekal (8 Songs after Richard Smekal) for high or medium voice and piano, Op. 12 (1916); words by Richard Smekal; Nos. 2, 3, 4, 6, 7 and 8 also for voice and chamber orchestra

1. Nächtliche Fahrt
2. Schnitterspruch
3. Versunkenheit
4. Brief am Abend
5. Ringelreihen im Frühling
6. Liebeselegie
7. Abendlied in der großen Stadt
8. Maiwanderung

- 6 Lieder (6 Songs) for medium voice and piano, Op. 21 (1918); also for voice and chamber orchestra

1. Schließe mir die Augen beide; words by Theodor Storm
2. Lied in die Ferne; words by Richard Smekal
3. Du; words by Ricarda Huch
4. Aus den Frühen Gedichten von Rainer Maria Rilke I: Bange Erwartung; words by Rainer Maria Rilke
5. Aus den Frühen Gedichten von Rainer Maria Rilke II: Nachtwind; words by Rainer Maria Rilke
6. Abendlied; words by Albrecht Schaeffer

- 6 Lieder nach Hermann Hesse (6 Songs after Hermann Hesse) for medium voice and piano, Op. 22 (1918); words by Hermann Hesse; Nos. 1~5 also for voice and chamber orchestra; No. 5 also with string orchestra

1. Im Grase hingestreckt
2. Böse Zeit
3. Oktober
4. Im Nebel
5. Drüben
6. Die leise Wolke

- Welt der Zyklamen for voice and piano, Op. 24 No. 3
- 4 Lieder nach Brentano (4 Songs after Brentano) for high voice and piano, Op. 34 (1931); words by Clemens Brentano; No. 1 also for high voice, solo flute and string orchestra; Nos. 2 and 3 also for voice and chamber orchestra

1. Abendständchen
2. Der Spinnerin Lied
3. Wiegenlied
4. Säusle, liebe Myrthe

- Schwanenlied for high voice and piano, Op. 34b; words by Clemens Brentano
- 8 Lieder nach Eichendorff (8 Songs after Eichendorff) for low voice and piano, Op. 36 (1932); words by Joseph Freiherr von Eichendorff; No. 1 also for voice and chamber orchestra

1. Der Einsiedler
2. Nachts I
3. Erinnerung
4. Der Abend
5. Nachts II
6. Sterbeglocken
7. Herbstweh
8. Abschied

- 6 Lieder nach Eichendorff (6 Songs after Eichendorff) for high voice and piano, Op. 37 (1932); words by Joseph Freiherr von Eichendorff

1. Lockung
2. Treue
3. Nachklänge I
4. Waldeinsamkeit
5. Die Nachtigallen
6. Herbst

- 8 Lieder nach Eichendorff (8 Songs after Eichendorff) for medium-high voice and piano, Op. 38 (1933); words by Joseph Freiherr von Eichendorff; Nos. 4 and 8 also for voice and chamber orchestra

1. Im Alter
2. Die Nacht
3. Am Strom
4. Winternacht
5. Nachtwanderer
6. Seliges Vergeßen
7. Nachklänge II
8. Valet

Choral

- Gesang der späten Linden for female chorus and chamber orchestra (or piano quintet), Op. 16 (revised 1933); words by Richard Smekal
- Der Abend for female chorus, flute, clarinet and string quartet, Op. 34a (1931); words by Clemens Brentano
- [2 Choruses], Op. 39 (1933); words by Friedrich Hölderlin

1. Lied der Freundschaft for male chorus a cappella
2. Lied der Liebe for mixed chorus a cappella

== Sources ==
- Eisen, Cliff (2001). "Salzburg". Grove Music Online (8th ed.). Oxford University Press. doi:10.1093/gmo/9781561592630.article.24437. ISBN 978-1-56159-263-0. (subscription, Wikilibrary access, or UK public library membership required) (subscription, Wikilibrary access, or UK public library membership required)
- Gruber, Gerold W. (n.d.). "Kornauth, Egon" in Oxford Music Online (subscription required), accessed 4 April 2014.
- Powell, Jonathan (2013). "Egon Kornauth Piano Works, Volume One." Essay in booklet accompanying CD of the same title, Toccata Classics, TOCC 0159.
