= Alvin Curran =

American musician and composer

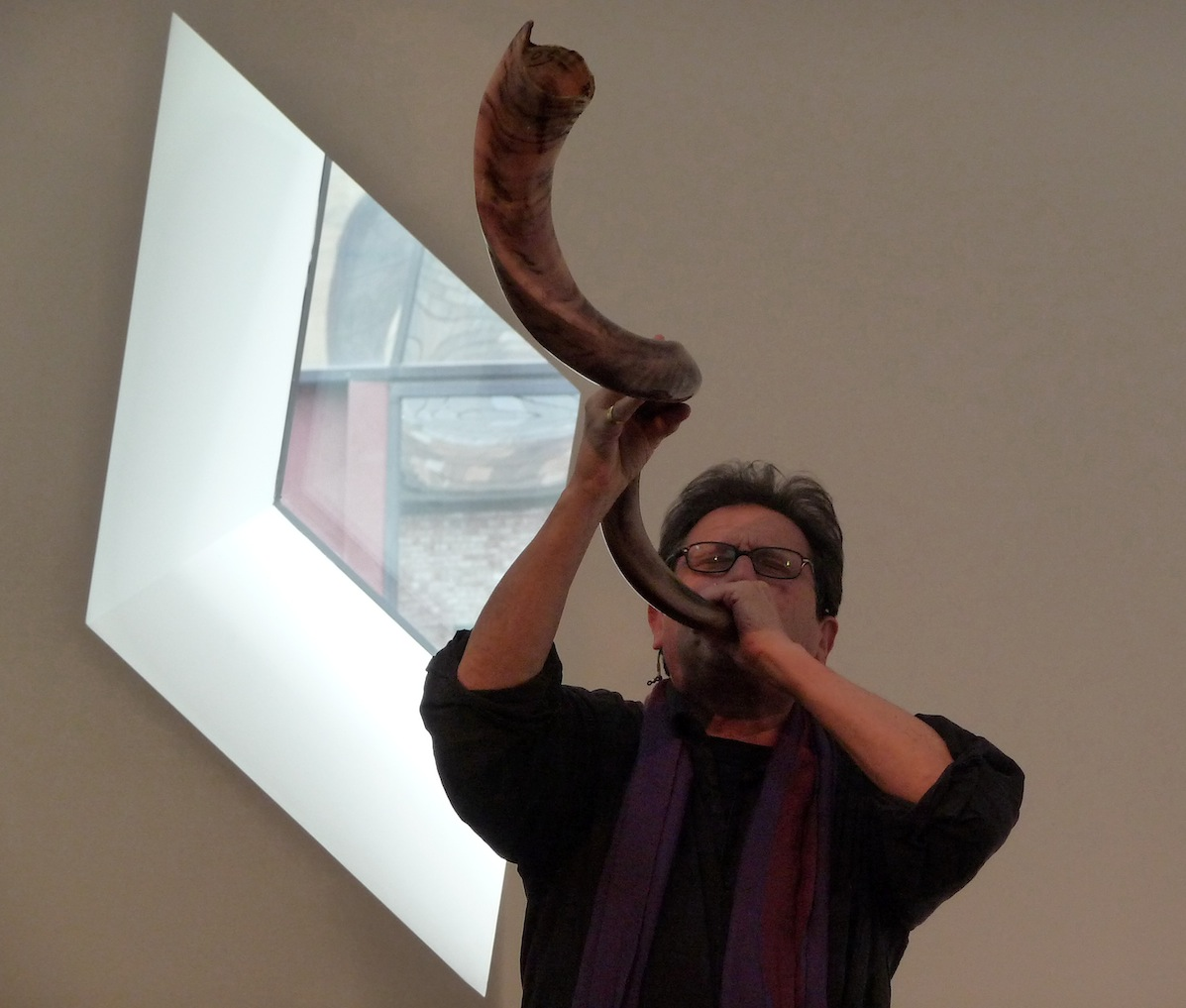
Alvin Curran playing the shofar in 2009

Alvin Curran (born December 13, 1938) is an American composer, performer, improviser, sound artist, and writer. He was born in Providence, Rhode Island, and lives and works in Rome, Italy. He is the co-founder, with Frederic Rzewski and Richard Teitelbaum, of Musica Elettronica Viva, and a former student of Elliott Carter. Curran's music often makes use of electronics and environmental found sounds. He was a professor of music at Mills College in California until 2006 and now teaches privately in Rome and sporadically at various institutions. He is an artistic advisor at the American Academy in Rome.

His works include solo performance pieces such as Endangered Species, TransDadaExpress, and Shofar; radio works such as Crystal Psalms, Un Altro Ferragosto, I Dreamt John Cage Yodeling at the Zurich Hauptbahnhof, and Living Room Music; large-scale musical choreographic works such as Oh Brass on the Grass Alas, for 300 amateur brass-band musicians, and the Maritime Rites series of performances on and near water; sound installation works such as Magic Carpet, Floor Plan, The Twentieth Century, and Gardening with John; chamber music such as For Cornelius for piano, the trio Schtyx, the string quartet VSTO, the saxophone quartet Electric Rags II, the percussion quartet THEME PARK, a series of works for chorus SATB, and the work for chamber orchestra and video Circus Maximus; The Book of Beginnings for orchestra, youth orchestra, self-playing pianos, and cellphone app; and many collaborative dance and theater works.

Since 1993, Curran has worked on Inner Cities, a growing series of solo piano pieces that together form one of the longest non-repetitive piano pieces ever written. Daniela Tortora has edited a book about his work, Alvin Curran Live in Roma (Die Schachtel 2010). In 2015 he published The Alvin Curran Fakebook, an atypical autobiography that includes photos, writings, and sketches alongside more than 200 scores and fragments ranging from raw sonic materials to conceptual musics and completed compositions. His articles have been published in The New York Times, Leonardo, The Contemporary Music Review, and Musiktexte, among others.

== Selected discography ==
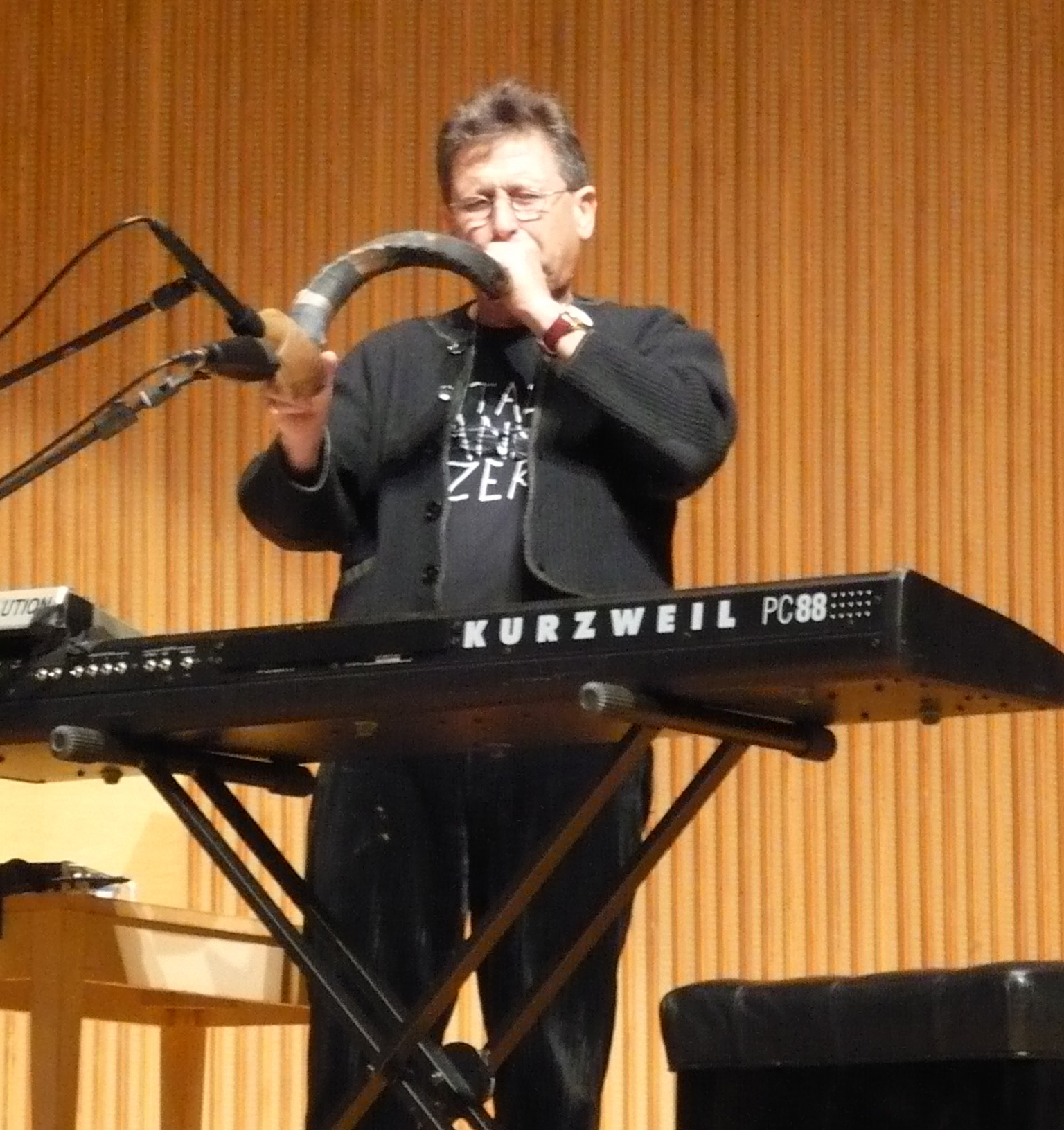
Alvin Curran

- Songs and Views of the Magnetic Garden (1974 Ananda, reissue 1993) Catalyst Records
- Fiori Chiari Fiori Oscuri (1975) Ananda No. 4
- In Real Time (Ictus, 1978), with Evan Parker and Andrea Centazzo
- The Works (1978) Fore
- Canti Illuminati (1980 Fore, reissue 2004) Fringes Recordings
- Natural History (1982) Editions Gianozzo
- Maritime Rites, ten environmental concerts produced for National Public Radio (1984, reissue 2004) New World Records
- Field It and Lenz (1985) Radio Art Foundation
- For Cornelius and Era Ora (1986), Ursula Oppens, Frederic Rzewski pianos, New Albion
- Electric Rags II (1989) New Albion Records, with Rova Saxophone Quartet
- Hyper Beatles (1990) Aki Takahashi piano, Toshiba-EMI/Angel
- Il Clarinetto (1992) David Keberle clarinet/Curran electronics, BMG Ariola
- Schtyx (1994) Abel Steinberg Winant Trio, with VSTO (string quartet) David Abel, Sharon Wood, Meg Tichener, Dina Weinschelbaum, CRI.
- Animal Behaviour (1995) Tzadik.
- Yvar Mikhashoff plays Alvin Curran: Piano Works (1995) Mode Records
- Theme Park (1998) Tzadik.
- Crystal Psalms (1999) New World Records
- riverrun: voicings/soundscapes (1999) Klaus Schöning, editor, WERGO
- The Things In Between (1999) Eve Egoyan, piano, Artifact
- Time Tracks (1999) Jeanne Golan, piano, Albany Records
- Apollo and Marsyas, Het Apollohuis 1980–1997: An anthology of new music concerts (2002) ACD
- Inner Cities (2003), Bruce Brubaker, piano, Arabesque Recordings
- Lost Marbles (2004) Tzadik.
- Our Ur (2004), with Domenico Sciajno, Rossbin Production
- ABO: Un Ritratto Sonoro (2004) Companion to the book, Lezione di boxe by Achille Bonita Oliva, Luca Sossella
- Vindobona Blues (2005) Kunstradio OR
- Toto Angelica (2005) I Dischi di Angelica.
- Hesitation-Tango (2005) Aki Takahashi, piano, Camerata
- Inner Cities (2005) Daan Vandewalle, piano, Long Distance Records
- The Art of the Fluke (2007), with Cenk Ergün, TEAR Records
- Hope Street Tunnel Blues (2007) Bruce Brubaker, piano, Arabesque Recordings
- For Cornelius, Kees Wieringa, Do Records
- The Stroke That Kills (2008) Seth Josel, guitar, New World Records
- The Magic Carpet (2008), reissue of 1971 LP on SOURCE, music of the avant garde: Source Records 1–6, 1968–1971, Pogus Productions
- Endangered Species (2010), ATOPOS Records
- Under the Fig Tree/The Magic Carpet (2010), Die Schachtel
- Alvin Curran: Solo Works – the '70s (2010), 3-CD set, New World Records
- MMM Quartet – Live At The Metz' Arsenal (2012), with Joelle Leandre, Fred Frith, Urs Leimgruber, Leo Records
- Shofar Rags (2013) Tzadik
- Inner Cities 8, Eve Egoyan, (2014) Other Minds Records
- On Hearing the Brooklyn Bridge Sing in Yiddish (2016), SWR Digital
- Natural History (2017), Black Truffle
- The Irrawaddy Blues (2017), Documenta 14
- From The Alvin Curran Fakebook: The Biella Sessions (2017), Dodicilune
- Endangered Species, 2-CD set. New World Records 80804, 2018.
- Dead Beats, performed by Reinier Van Houdt. 2-CD set, Moving Furniture Records, 2019.
- Café Grand Abyss by Jon Rose & Alvin Curran - ReR Megacorp, JRAC, 2019 (CD/DL).
- Community Garden, with Walter Prati, CD Da Vinci Classics C00405 and digital album, 2021
- Achim Freyer Trifft Don Giovanni am Checkpoint Charlie (Achim Freyer Meets Don Giovanni at Checkpoint Charlie), a radio work for Deutschlandradio, 2022
- Drumming Up Trouble, BLACKTRUFFLE094, LP and digital download, 2022

=== Discography with Musica Elettronica Viva ===
- Friday (2008) reissue of 1969 Polydor LP by Alga Marghen
- Spacecraft/Unified Patchwork Theory (2001) Alga Marghen
- apogee – MEV/AMM (2005) Matchless Recordings
- MEV40 (2008) 4-CD set with 40 years of music, New World Records
- AMM/MEV: Live Electronic Music Improvised (2009) reissue of 1968 Mainstream LP by WERGO
- Symphony No 106, Les Disques Victo, 2016 VICTO CD 129, 2016, and digital album
- Symphony No. 105, a Café Oto download available as 320k MP3 or 24bit FLAC, 2016
- Symphony No 108, Live at Brno Philharmonic, Hermes' Ear - HE CD 015 / aSB 03, 2017
- Spacecraft Alga Marghen CD 2001, Our Swimmer LP, welle 104LP, 2021
- Symphony No. 107 - The Bard, Black Truffle 104, June 2023

== See also ==
- Joseph H. Bearns Prize

== Sources ==
https://www.nytimes.com/2016/05/15/opinion/sunday/the-trombone-comes-home.html?_r=0
