= Alistair Hinton =

Scottish composer

Alistair Richard Hinton (born 6 October 1950) is a Scottish composer and musicologist with a focus on the works of his friend Kaikhosru Shapurji Sorabji. He is the curator of the Sorabji Archive.

== Career and works ==
Hinton, a native of Dunfermline, Fife, began studying music at the age of eleven; following the advice of Benjamin Britten, he studied at the Royal College of Music, where Humphrey Searle and Stephen Savage were among his teachers. Although he began composing at an early age, he later destroyed most of his pre-1985 output.

His Op. 1 was a piano sonata (1962); although part of it was lost soon after it was written, the composer responded to a private request in 2020 to reconstruct it. His other compositions include sonatas, variations and other works for piano, a violin concerto (dedicated to Jane Manning), songs (amongst them settings of Rabindranath Tagore, Hinton's Opp. 7 and 9), works for the organ, a string quintet (for two violins, viola, cello, double-bass and soprano, and lasting for 2 hours and 45 minutes in performance), and a Sinfonietta. They include homages to Karol Szymanowski (Szymanowski-Etiud, Op. 32, for 18 wind instruments), Richard Strauss (Passeggiata Straussiana, for euphonium and piano, Op. 39), and Charles-Valentin Alkan in the Piano Sonata no. 5, which has a substantial passage marked "Alkanique". The latter influenced Marc-André Hamelin in composing his own Étude no. 4.

Among those who have performed and recorded Hinton's works are Donna Amato, Jonathan Powell, Yonty Solomon and Kevin Bowyer.

=== Personal life ===
In 2014, Hinton and his wife Terry were responsible for a petition to the British government to remove the statutory immunity it gives to the Financial Conduct Authority (FCA) so it is not liable for damages.

He currently lives with his wife in Hereford.

== Sorabji ==
In 1969, Hinton came across a copy of the four-hour Opus clavicembalisticum of the reclusive composer Kaikhosru Shapurji Sorabji (1892–1988), which greatly impressed him. In 1976, he persuaded the composer to relax the ban he had placed on unauthorised performance of his music in the 1930s. Hinton subsequently founded the Sorabji Archive, which publishes Sorabji's writings and compositions and maintains a collection of his manuscripts and archival materials; he remains its curator. Hinton contributed two chapters to the 1992 book, Sorabji: A Critical Celebration. He was the dedicatee of eight works by Sorabji, and was the sole heir of his oeuvre.

== Sources ==
- Hamelin, Marc-André (2005). Étude No. IV: Étude à mouvement perpétuellement semblable (d'après Alkan). Portland, Oregon: Pelisorius Editions.
- Rapoport, Paul (ed.) (1992). Sorabji: A Critical Celebration, Farnham: Ashgate. ISBN 978-0-85967-923-7.
