= Rudolf Koeckert =

German violinist

Rudolf Josef Koeckert (27 June 1913 – 7 September 2005) was a German violinist.

== Life ==
Koeckert was born in Velké Březno near Aussig, Bohemia. Until 1938, Koeckert studied in the master class of the Prague Conservatory and was concertmaster of the German Philharmonic Orchestra Prague from 1939 to 1945, which moved to Bamberg after the Second World War and took the name Bamberg Symphony. Koeckert was concertmaster there from 1946 to 1947. He then moved to Munich, where he was concertmaster of the Symphonieorchester des Bayerischen Rundfunks for 30 years from 1949. From 1952, he was also professor for violin playing at the Leopold Mozart Conservatory in Augsburg.

In 1939, Koeckert and former fellow students had founded the "Sudetendeutsche String Quartet", which was later renamed the "Prager Deutsches Streichquartett". This ensemble performed in Bamberg (from 1949 based in Munich) under the name Koeckert Quartet from 1947 and made a name for itself in the following years on numerous concert tours at home and abroad, and also through the world premieres of chamber music works by many contemporary composers. In 1950, Rudolf Koeckert discovered a previously unknown string quartet in C minor by Anton Bruckner (1824-1896) and published it in Vienna in 1956. In 1982, he retired from the Koeckert Quartet.
