= Obolsunovo =

Obolsunovo Оболсуново
- Village
- Location within Ivanovo Oblast Location within Russia
- Coordinates: 56°54′N 40°36′E
- Country: Russia
- Region: Ivanovo Oblast
- District: Teykovsky District
- Time zone: UTC+3:00

Obolsunovo (Russian: Оболсуново) is a rural locality (a selo) in Teykovsky District, Ivanovo Oblast, Russia. Population: 283 (2010 census);

== Geography ==
This rural locality is located 7 kilometres (4.3 mi) from Teykovo (the district's administrative centre), 23 kilometres (14 mi) from Ivanovo (capital of Ivanovo Oblast) and 222 kilometres (138 mi) from Moscow. Vantino is the nearest rural locality.
