= Piano Sonata No. 6 (Feinberg) =

The Piano Sonata No. 6, Op. 13, by Samuil Feinberg was composed in 1923. The piece received its premiere on 4 September 1925 at the Festival of Contemporary Music in Venice. Its premiere was attended by famous composers of the time such as Igor Stravinsky and Arnold Schoenberg. Feinberg's composition was well-received, and would remain his only piano sonata to receive a wide publication.

== History ==
The sonata received its premiere on 4 September 1925 at the Festival of Contemporary Music in Venice, with Feinberg himself as the soloist. The piece was well received and even resulted in some publicity when the Dutch journal De Telegraaf pitted Feinberg's composition against the Piano Sonata of Igor Stravinsky, who was also in attendance of the festival.

== Structure and content ==
The 6th sonata encompasses a single movement, usually lasting around 15 minutes.

== Discography ==
- Victor Bunin - Melodiya С 10—13887-88 (1980)
- Victor Bunin - Classical Records (Russia) CR-075 (2006)
- Yuri Favorin - Melodiya CD 10 02459 (2016)
- Marc-André Hamelin - Hyperion CDA68233 (2020)
- Hideyo Harada - DIVOX DIV 25209 (rec. 1991, released 1996)
- Christophe Sirodeau - BIS 1413 (2003)
- Evgeny Starodubtsev - RCR Moscow Conservatory Records (2022)
