= Alain Poirier =

French musicologist

Alain Poirier (born 1 September 1954) is a French musicologist and administrator having studied solfeggio and clarinet at the Conservatoire de Montluçon.

== Life ==
Born in Désertines, Poirier studied writing, musical analysis and music history at the Conservatoire de Paris. From 1989 to 1993, he was professor of analysis at the Conservatoire, then successively in charge of the departments of pedagogy (1992-1995), theoretical disciplines (1993-97) and musicology (1997-2000). During this period, he was also a professor of music history and musicology. Since 1995, he has also been a lecturer at the École Polytechnique.

In September 2000, he was appointed Director of the Conservatoire de Paris, a position he held until 2009.

He was also a member of the editorial board of the magazines Analyse musicale and Musurgia.

== Publications ==
- Arnold Schoenberg (Fayard, 1993)
- L'expressionnisme et la musique (1995), prize of the Académie Charles Cros
- Toru Takemitsu (1996), prix des Muses
- Le Conservatoire de Paris, 1795-1995 : Deux cents ans de pédagogie (1999)
- André Boucourechliev (2002), Prize of the Académie Charles Cros
- Webern et l’art de l’aphorisme (Cité de la musique, 2009)
- Conversation with Alain Poirier in Remy Campos, Le Conservatoire de Paris et son histoire, une institution en questions, Paris, L'Œil d'or publishing house, 2016, ISBN 9782913661790
