= Konstantin Eiges =

Russian composer, teacher and pianist

- Константин Эйгес
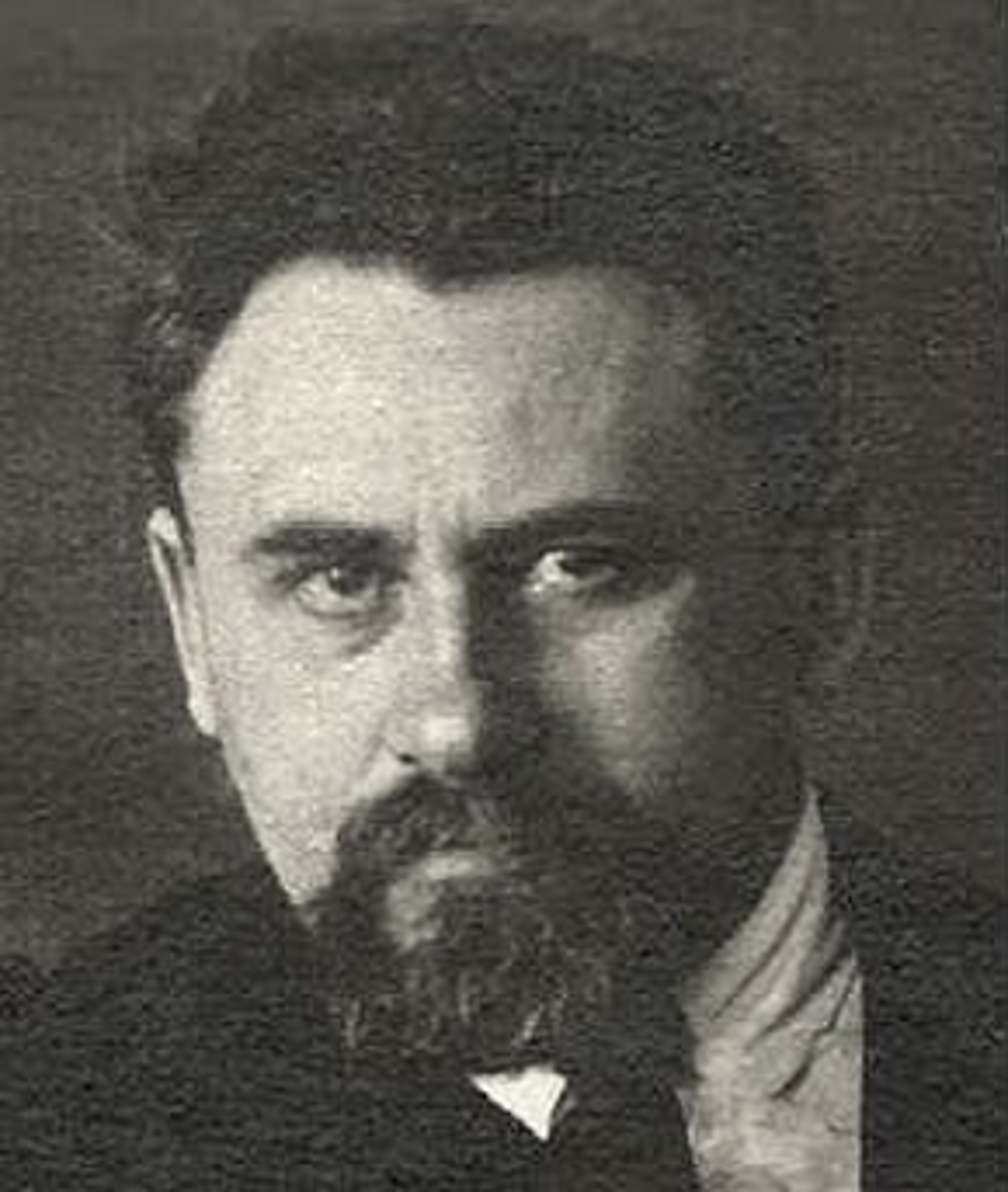
- Konstantin Eiges, in the 1920s
- Born: 24 May 1875; Bogodukhov, Russian Empire
- Died: 2 December 1950 (aged 75)
- Education: Moscow Conservatory
- Occupation: Composer

Konstantin Romanovich Eiges (surname sometimes spelt Eyges; Russian: Константин Романович Эйгес; 5 June [O.S. 24 May] 1875 – 2 December 1950) was a Russian composer, teacher, and pianist.

== Early life ==
Eiges was born in Bogodukhov (now Bohodukhiv in Kharkiv oblast, Ukraine), to Jewish parents, the doctor Ruvim Manasiyevich (also known as Roman Mikhailovich) Eiges (born Vilnius, 1840) and his wife Sofiya (Shifra) Iosifovna, née Eltsin. He was one of ten children, many of whom went on to artistic or academic careers; Vladimir Eiges (1877-1949) was a professor of mathematics, Aleksandr (1880-1943), also a mathematician, was an authority on Anton Chekhov, Veniamin (1888-1956) was an artist, Yekaterina (1890-1958) was a poet and sometime girlfriend of Sergei Esenin.

== Career ==
Eiges attended Moscow Conservatory between 1900 and 1905, where his teachers included Mikhail Ippolitov-Ivanov (composition), Sergei Taneyev (counterpoint) and Adolf Yaroshevsky (piano). He was a colleague of Sergei Rachmaninoff and Nikolai Medtner. His pupils included Alexei Stanchinsky. Most of his compositions are for piano solo, though he also wrote songs and chamber works, a cantata The Song of Oleg the Wise, and a symphonic poem, The Snowstorm. Eiges wrote numerous essays on music and philosophy, including essays on Richard Wagner and Alexander Skriabin.

== Family ==
Eiges was the father of the composer Oleg Eiges (1905-1992) and the artist Sergei Eiges (1910-1944).
