= Samuil Feinberg =

Russian pianist and composer (1890–1962)

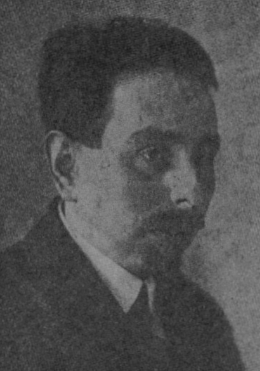
- Born: 26 May 1890; Odessa, Russian Empire
- Died: 22 October 1962 (aged 72); Moscow, Soviet Union
- Education: Moscow Conservatory
- Occupations: Composer; pianist
- Awards: Order of Lenin; Honoured Artist of the RSFSR; Stalin Prize

Samuil Yevgenyevich Feinberg (Russian: Самуи́л Евге́ньевич Фе́йнберг, also Samuel; 26 May 1890 – 22 October 1962) was a Russian and Soviet composer and pianist.

== Biography ==
Born in Odessa, Feinberg lived in Moscow from 1894 and studied with Aleksandr Goldenweiser at the Moscow Conservatory. He also studied composition privately under Nikolai Zhilyayev. He graduated from the Conservatory in 1911, after which he embarked upon a career as a solo pianist, while composing on the side. However, he was soon sent to fight in the First World War for Russia until he became ill and was discharged. In 1922, he joined the faculty at the Moscow Conservatory, relaunching his pianistic career. By 1930, due to the political repressions in Stalin's Russia, Feinberg's concert activities became limited. He made only two foreign trips in the 1930s: Vienna in 1936 and Brussels in 1938; hence he is generally not well known outside Russia. In 1946, he was awarded the Stalin Prize.

Feinberg was the first pianist to perform the complete The Well-Tempered Clavier by Bach in concert in the USSR. He is most remembered today for his complete recording of it, and many other works from the classical and romantic eras. He also composed three piano concertos, a dozen piano sonatas (private recordings exist of him playing his piano Sonatas 1, 2, 9 and 12), as well as fantasias and other works for the instrument. Pianist Tatiana Nikolayeva said that each of his sonatas was a "poem of life". Feinberg has been called "A musical heir to Scriabin", who heard the young pianist play his fourth sonata and praised it highly.

He was a life-long bachelor. He lived with his brother Leonid, who was a poet and painter. He died in 1962, aged 72.

== Honours and awards ==
- Order of Lenin
- Honoured Artist of the RSFSR (1937)
- Stalin Prize (1946)
- Two Orders of the Red Banner of Labour

== Works ==
=== Compositions for solo piano ===
- Op. 1: Piano Sonata No. 1 (1915)
- Op. 2: Piano Sonata No. 2 (1915)
- Op. 3: Piano Sonata No. 3 (1917)
- Op. 5: Fantasia No. 1 (1917)
- Op. 6: Piano Sonata No. 4 (1918)
- Op. 8: Four Preludes (1920)
  1. Allegretto
  2. Misterioso
  3. Tumoltuoso
  4. Con moto
- Op. 9: Fantasia No. 2 (1921)
- Op. 10: Piano Sonata No. 5 (1921)
- Op. 11: Suite No. 1 (1922)
- Op. 13: Piano Sonata No. 6 (1923)
- Op. 15: Three Preludes (1922)
  1. Allegro affanato e molto rubato
  2. Andante con tenerezza
  3. Presto
- Op. 17: Two Cadenzas to Beethoven's Piano Concerto No. 4 (1930-1935)
- Op. 19: Humoresque
- Op. 19a: Berceuse
- Op. 21: Piano Sonata No. 7 (1925)
- Op. 21a: Piano Sonata No. 8 (1928)
- Op. 24a: Two Chuvash Melodies
- Op. 25: Suite No. 2 (1936)
- Op. 27a: Three Melodies (1938)
  1. Georgian Song
  2. Tartar Song
  3. Armenian Song
- Op. 29: Piano Sonata No. 9 (1939)
- Op. 30: Piano Sonata No. 10 (1940–44)
- Op. 31: 3 Transcriptions of symphonies of Tchaikovsky (1942)
  1. 'Andante marziale' from Symphony No. 2, Op. 17
  2. 'Waltz' from Symphony No. 5, Op. 64
  3. 'Allegro molto vivace' from Symphony No. 6, Op. 74
- Op. 33: Two Pieces (1947)
  1. Tale
  2. Procession
- Op. 35: Transcriptions of works of J.S. Bach (1925-1934)
- Op. 37: Transcription of Prelude and Fugue in E Minor, BWV 548 by J.S. Bach (1937-1948?)
- Op. 38: Transcription of Largo from Organ Sonata No.5 in C Major, BWV 529 by J.S. Bach (1935-1938?)
- Op. 40: Piano Sonata No. 11 (1952)
- Op. 41: 4 Cadenzas to Mozart's Piano Concerto, K.467 (1952?)
- Op. 42: Transcription of Nocturne from String Quartet No.2, by A. Borodin (1942-1943?)
- Op. 43: 3 Transcriptions of Tchaikovsky's Songs, Op.54 (1942-1943?)
- Op. 45: Rhapsody on Kabardino-Balkarian Themes (1961)
- Op. 48: Piano Sonata No. 12 (1962)

=== Concertante ===
- Op. 20: Piano Concerto No. 1 in C major (1931)
- Op. 36: Piano Concerto No. 2 in D major (1944)
- Op. 44: Piano Concerto No. 3 in C minor (1947)

=== For piano and voice ===
- Op. 4: Two Romances after Alexander Pushkin and Mikhail Lermontov
  1. Заклинание (Incantation)
  2. Из-под таинственной, холодной полумаски (Behind the Mysterious Cold Half-Mask)
- Op. 7: Three Romances after Alexander Blok
  1. Голоса (снежная ночь) – Voices (Snowy Night)
  2. И я опять затих у ног (снежная ночь) – Once more I'm silent at your feet (Snowy Night)
  3. В бездействии младом (стихи о прекрасной даме) – In Youthful indolence
- Op. 14: Four Romances after Valery Bryusov, Alexander Blok, and Andrei Bely (1917, unpublished)
- Op. 16: Three Romances after Alexander Pushkin (1923)
  1. Анчар – Anchar
  2. Друг мой милый – My Beloved
  3. Напрасно я бегу к Сионским высотам – In vain I hasten onto the heights of Sion
- Op. 18 – 5 National Songs (1932)
  1. Лох-Ломонд (Шотландская)
  2. Хоровод (Английская)
  3. Деревенская девушка (Английская)
  4. Похищение из Тюэри (Ирландская)
  5. Ночная песнь рыбаков (Валлийская)
- Op. 22: Two Songs after Aleksandr Zharov (1932)
- Op. 23: Three Songs (1938)
- Op. 23a: Song after Dmitry Dolgonemov (1934)
- Op. 24: 25 Chuvash Songs after Yuri Stremin (1935-1936)
- Op. 26: Eight Romances after Alexander Pushkin (1936)
  1. Не пой, красавица, при мне... – Do not sing, my beauty, to me
  2. Зимний вечер – Winter Evening
  3. Под небом голубым страны своей родной – Under the blue skies of her native land
  4. Туча – Cloud
  5. Три ключа – Three Springs
  6. Я помню чудное мгновенье – I Remember a Wonderful Moment
  7. Сожженное письмо – The Burned Letter
  8. Няне — Подруга дней моих суровых... – To Nanny – My friend through my travails, woes hardest..
- Op. 27: 12 Songs (1935-1937)
- Op. 28: Seven Romances after Mikhail Lermontov (1940)
  1. Дубовый листок – Oak Leaf
  2. Пленный рыцарь – The Imprisoned Knight
  3. Сон – The Dream
  4. Еврейская мелодия – Hebrew Melody
  5. Русалка – The River Sprite
  6. Нет, не тебя так пылко я люблю – No, it's not you I love so hotly
  7. Выхожу одни я но дорогу – Onto the Highway, on my own, I walk
- Op. 32: 3 Songs after Sergei Severtsev and Sergei Gorodetsky
- Op. 34: 6 Kabardian Songs (1941)
- Op. 39: 4 Songs after Yuri Stremin (1939)
- Op. 47: Maritsa, after Yugoslavian Folk Poetry (1958)
  1. Марица – Maritsa
  2. Первая любовь – The First Love
  3. Девушка и конь – The Horse and The Girl
  4. Разговор со смертью – Conversation with Death
  5. Македонская девушка – Macedonian Girl
  6. Уж как выпал снег... – Ah, How Fell The Snow
  7. Колыбельная – Lullaby
  8. Ожидание – Waiting

=== Violin sonatas ===
- Op. 12: Violin Sonata No. 1 (1912, incomplete)
- Op. 46: Violin Sonata No. 2 (1955–56)
