= Nikolai Zhilyayev (footballer) =

Russian footballer

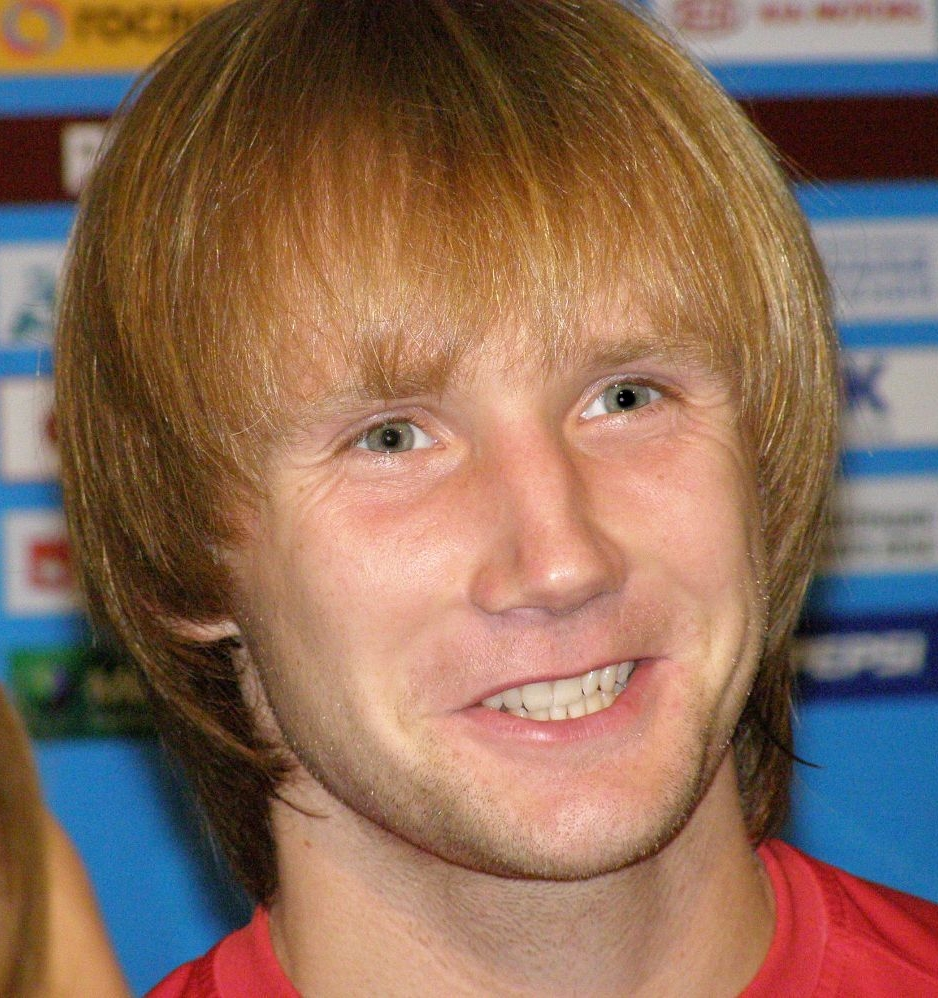

Personal information
- Full name: Nikolai Yuryevich Zhilyayev
- Date of birth: 5 March 1987 (age 39)
- Place of birth: Gorky, Russian SFSR
- Height: 1.78 m (5 ft 10 in)
- Position: Left winger

Youth career
- 2003: FC Titan Moscow
- 2004–2006: FC Lokomotiv Moscow

Senior career*
Years	Team	Apps	(Gls)
2007	FC Lokomotiv Moscow	0	(0)
2007	→ FC Zvezda Irkutsk (loan)	29	(7)
2008–2009	FC Amkar Perm	43	(3)
2010–2013	FC Kuban Krasnodar	35	(3)
2013–2014	FC Ufa	28	(1)
2014–2015	FC Fakel Voronezh	22	(4)
2016	FC Tekstilshchik Ivanovo	3	(0)
2016	FC Olimpiyets Nizhny Novgorod	6	(0)
2017	FC SKA Rostov-on-Don	11	(1)

International career
2008	Russia U-21	1	(0)
- * Club domestic league appearances and goals

Nikolai Yuryevich Zhilyayev (Russian: Николай Юрьевич Жиляев; born 5 March 1987) is a Russian former footballer.
