= Nikolai Zhilyayev (musicologist) =

Nikolay Sergeyevich Zhilyayev
- Никола́й Серге́евич Жиля́ев
- Born: 18 November 1881
- Died: 20 January 1938 (aged 56)
- Education: Moscow Conservatory
- Occupations: Musicologist, pedagogue

Nikolay Sergeyevich Zhilyayev (Russian: Никола́й Серге́евич Жиля́ев, Nikolaj Sergejevič Žiljajev; 18 November (N.S.) 1881 – 20 January 1938), was a musicologist, and the teacher of several 20th-century composers. He was a victim of political repression in the Soviet Union.

He was a pupil of Mikhail Ippolitov-Ivanov and Sergei Taneyev at the Moscow Conservatory in around 1904. He went on to teach there himself. His pupils included the composers Yevgeny Golubev, Aram Khachaturian, Lev Knipper, Alexei Fedorovich Kozlovsky, Alexei Vladimirovich Stanchinsky, Anatoly Nikolayevich Alexandrov and Samuil Evgenyevich Feinberg.

He was a member of the Russian Academy of Art-Sciences and of the State Institute of Musical Science. He wrote many essays.

== Death ==
Zhilyayev was arrested on charges of monarchism, terrorism, and spying. He was executed on 20 January 1938, during Joseph Stalin's state repression known as the Great Terror.

Rehabilitated in April 1961.
