= Opus clavicembalisticum =

Piano piece by Kaikhosru Shapurji Sorabji

- Piano piece by Kaikhosru Shapurji Sorabji
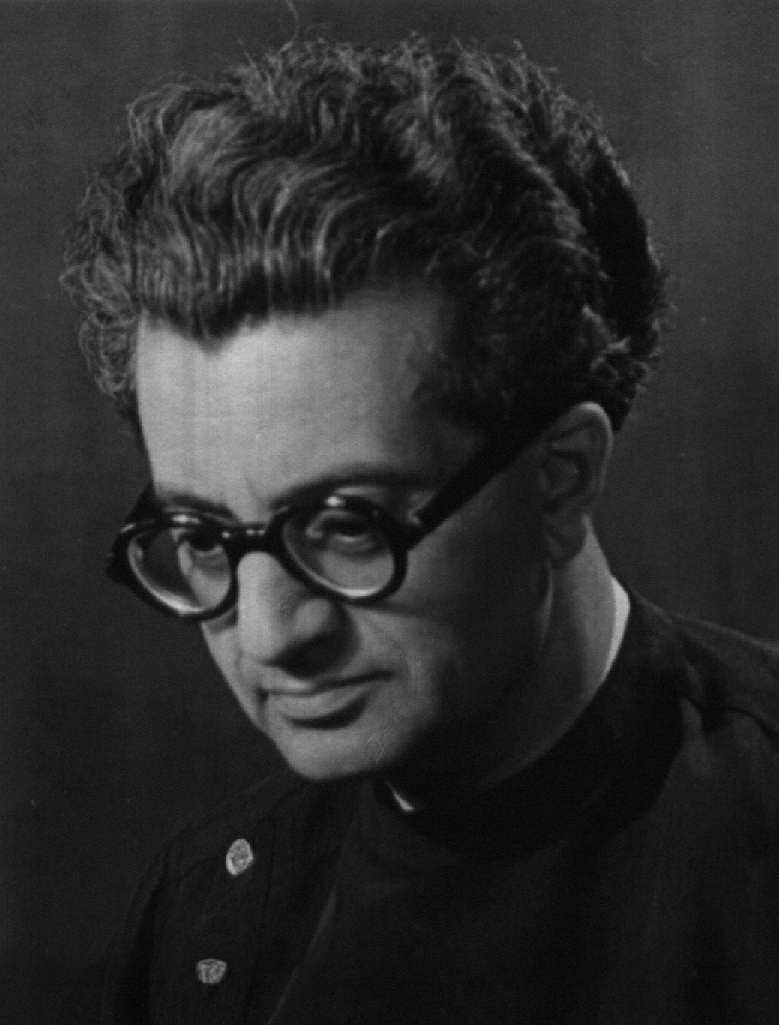
- Sorabji, c. 1950
- English: Piece for Keyboard
- Catalogue: KSS 50
- Form: Piano piece
- Composed: 1929–25 June 1930
- Dedication: Christopher Murray Grieve
- Published: 1931: London
- Publisher: J. Curwen and Sons Ltd.
- Recorded: 1980
- Duration: ca. 4 ¾ hours
- Movements: 12
- Scoring: piano solo

Premiere
- Date: 1 December 1930
- Location: Stevenson Hall, Glasgow
- Performers: Kaikhosru Shapurji Sorabji

Introito
First movement ("Introito"), played by Eric Xi Xin Liang

Opus clavicembalisticum (Latin: "Piece for Keyboard") is a work for piano solo by English composer-pianist Kaikhosru Shapurji Sorabji, written from 1929 to 25 June 1930. Notable for its unprecedented length, rhythmic and harmonic complexity and extreme difficulty, it was premièred in Glasgow by its author in the year of its completion.

By its time of completion, Opus clavicembalisticum was the longest and possibly most technically demanding piano piece in existence, taking around 4–4 1/2 hours to play, depending on tempi. However, various works by New Complexity, modernist and avant-garde composers, along with Sorabji himself, have since surpassed its statures: several of his later works, such as the Symphonic Variations for piano (approximate duration nine hours), exceed its length. It is in these areas that Opus clavicembalisticum is esteemed and primarily receives its reputation.

Sorabji may have partly been inspired to compose the work after hearing Egon Petri perform Ferruccio Busoni's Fantasia contrappuntistica; to an extent, Opus clavicembalisticum is an homage to the Fantasia. Sorabji's earlier Toccata No. 1 (1928) (likewise for piano solo and in multiple movements) exudes similar Busonian influence—in some ways prefiguring Opus clavicembalisticum.

The score, though strewn with errors consequent of the composer's dauntingly illegible manuscript, was published by J. Curwen and Sons in London in 1931.

== Structure ==
Opus clavicembalisticum is triptychal, with each part being longer than its predecessor. Altogether, the work possesses twelve movements of hugely varying dimensions from a three-minute-long cadenza to an hour-long interlude containing a toccata, adagio and passacaglia (with 81 variations). The work's constitution is as follows:

| | Pars Prima |
| I. | Introito |
| II. | Preludio-corale [Nexus] |
| III. | Fuga I. [quatuor vocibus] |
| IV. | Fantasia |
| V. | Fuga II. [duplex] |
| | Pars Altera |
| VI. | Interludium primum [Thema cum XLIX variationibus] |
| VII. | Cadenza I. |
| VIII. | Fuga tertia triplex |
| | Pars Tertia |
| IX. | Interludium alterum [Toccata:Adagio:Passacaglia cum LXXXI variationibus] |
| X. | Cadenza II. |
| XI. | Fuga IV. Quadruplex |
| XII. | CODA. Stretta |

The manuscript and publication both erroneously say that the sixth movement (Interludium primum) has forty-four variations instead of forty-nine.

== Composition and dedication ==
Shortly after completing the work on 25 June 1930, Sorabji wrote a friend of his that:

With a wracking head and literally my whole body shaking as with ague I write this and tell you I have just this afternoon early finished Clavicembalisticum... The closing 4 pages are so cataclysmic and catastrophic as anything I've ever done—the harmony bites like nitric acid—the counterpoint grinds like the mills of God...

[underneath, Sorabji quotes the work's final chord, to which is affixed: "I am the Spirit that denies!" (Note: Ich bin der Geist, der stets verneint. Mephistopheles, in Johann Wolfgang von Goethe's Faust.)]

The dedication on the title page reads:

"TO MY TWO FRIENDS (E DUOBUS UNUM) (Note: "From two, one", i.e. both names refer to the same individual. Hugh MacDiarmid was the pen name of Scottish writer Christopher Murray Grieve.) HUGH M'DIARMID and C.M. GRIEVE

"LIKEWISE TO THE EVERLASTING GLORY OF THOSE FEW MEN BLESSED AND SANCTIFIED IN THE CURSES AND EXECRATIONS OF THOSE MANY WHOSE PRAISE IS ETERNAL DAMNATION."

J. Curwen & Sons of London published the score in 1931; the first edition runs 252 pages.

== Performances ==
There have been over twenty performances of the complete Opus clavicembalisticum. Its première was by Sorabji himself on 1 December 1930 in Glasgow, under the auspices of the "Active Society for the Propagation of Contemporary Music".

Pars prima was performed by John Tobin on 10 March 1936; this performance is noted to have taken approximately twice as long as the score dictates. This performance, and its reception, may have led to Sorabji's 'ban' on public performances of his works; he asserted that "no performance at all is vastly preferable to an obscene travesty". Sorabji maintained this until 1976.

Opus clavicembalisticum was unperformed for the following 46 years until it was played by Geoffrey Douglas Madge in 1982. A recording of the performance was released on a (now out-of-print) set of four LPs. Madge performed it in public in its entirety on six occasions from 1982 to 2002 (the second occasion, in 1983, was at Mandel Hall in Chicago; it was recorded, and released by BIS Records in 1999).

John Ogdon publicly performed the work in London twice, towards the end of his life, and produced a studio recording of the work. Jonathan Powell gave his first performance of the work in London in 2003; he has since played it in New York City (2004), Helsinki and Saint Petersburg (2005) and, in 2017, he embarked on a tour with it to include performances in Brighton, London, Oxford, Karlsruhe, Glasgow, Brno and elsewhere.

The only other verifiable and complete public performances of this work have been given by Daan Vandewalle in Brugge, Madrid and Berlin, although some pianists have performed excerpts, which are usually the first two movements (Introito and Preludio-corale). For example, Jean-Jacques Schmid performed part of the work at the Biennale Bern 03 and Alexander Amatosi performed the first movement at the University of Durham School of Music in 2001.
