= Contemporary classical music =

Post-1945 period in classical music

Contemporary classical music is European art music composed close to the present day. At the beginning of the 21st century, it commonly referred to the post-1945 post-tonal music after the death of Anton Webern, and included serial music, electronic music, experimental music, and minimalist music. Newer forms include spectral music and post-minimalism.

== History ==
=== Background ===
At the beginning of the 20th century, composers of classical music were experimenting with an increasingly dissonant pitch language, which sometimes yielded atonal pieces. Following World War I, as a backlash against what they saw as the increasingly exaggerated gestures and formlessness of late Romanticism, certain composers adopted a neoclassic style, which sought to recapture the balanced forms and clearly perceptible thematic processes of earlier styles (see also New Objectivity and social realism). In the post-war era, modernist composers sought to achieve greater levels of control in their composition process (e.g., through the use of the twelve-tone technique and later total serialism). At the same time, conversely, composers also experimented with means of abdicating control, exploring indeterminacy or aleatoric processes in smaller or larger degrees. Technological advances led to the birth of electronic music. Experimentation with tape loops and repetitive textures contributed to the advent of minimalism. Still other composers started exploring the theatrical potential of the musical performance (performance art, mixed media, fluxus). New works of contemporary classical music continue to be created. Each year, the Boston Conservatory at Berklee presents 700 performances. New works from contemporary classical music program students comprise roughly 150 of these performances.

=== 1945–75 ===
To some extent, European and American traditions diverged after World War II. Among the most influential composers in Europe were Pierre Boulez, Luigi Nono, and Karlheinz Stockhausen. The first and last were both pupils of Olivier Messiaen. An important aesthetic philosophy as well as a group of compositional techniques at this time was serialism (also called "through-ordered music", "'total' music" or "total tone ordering"), which took as its starting point the compositions of Arnold Schoenberg and Anton Webern (and thus was opposed to traditional twelve-tone music), and was also closely related to Le Corbusier's idea of the modulor. However, some more traditionally based composers such as Dmitri Shostakovich and Benjamin Britten maintained a tonal style of composition despite the prominent serialist movement.

In America, composers like Milton Babbitt, John Cage, George Crumb, Elliott Carter, Henry Cowell, Philip Glass, Steve Reich, George Rochberg, and Roger Sessions formed their own ideas. Some of these composers (Cage, Cowell, Glass, Reich) represented a new methodology of experimental music, which began to question fundamental notions of music such as notation, performance, duration, and repetition, while others (Babbitt, Rochberg, Sessions) fashioned their own extensions of the twelve-tone serialism of Schoenberg.

== Movements ==
=== Neoromanticism ===
The vocabulary of extended tonality, which flourished in the late 19th and very early 20th centuries, continues to be used by contemporary composers. It has never been considered shocking or controversial in the larger musical world—as has been demonstrated statistically for the United States, at least, where "most composers continued working in what has remained throughout this century the mainstream of tonal-oriented composition".

=== High modernism ===
Serialism is one of the most important post-war movements among the high modernist schools. Serialism, more specifically named "integral" or "compound" serialism, was led by composers such as Pierre Boulez, Luciano Berio, Bruno Maderna, Luigi Nono, and Karlheinz Stockhausen in Europe, and by Milton Babbitt, Donald Martino, Mario Davidovsky, and Charles Wuorinen in the United States. Some of their compositions use an ordered set or several such sets, which may be the basis for the whole composition, while others use "unordered" sets. The term is also often used for dodecaphony, or twelve-tone technique, which is alternatively regarded as the model for integral serialism.

Despite its decline in the last third of the 20th century, there remained at the end of the century an active core of composers who continued to advance the ideas and forms of high modernism. Those no longer living include Pierre Boulez, Pauline Oliveros, Toru Takemitsu, Jacob Druckman, George Perle, Ralph Shapey, Franco Donatoni, Wolfgang Rihm, Jonathan Harvey, Erkki Salmenhaara, Henrik Otto Donner and Richard Wernick. Those still living in October 2025 include Helmut Lachenmann, Salvatore Sciarrino, Magnus Lindberg, George Benjamin, Brian Ferneyhough, Richard Wilson, and James MacMillan.

==== Electronic music ====
===== Computer music =====
Between 1975 and 1990, a shift in the paradigm of computer technology had taken place, making electronic music systems affordable and widely accessible. The personal computer had become an essential component of the electronic musician's equipment, superseding analog synthesizers and fulfilling the traditional functions of composition and scoring, synthesis and sound processing, sampling of audio input, and control over external equipment.

==== Polystylism (eclecticism) ====
Some authors equate polystylism with eclecticism, while others make a sharp distinction.

=== Post-modernism ===
==== Historicism ====
Musical historicism—the use of historical materials, structures, styles, techniques, media, conceptual content, etc., whether by a single composer or those associated with a particular school, movement, or period—is evident to varying degrees in minimalism, post-minimalism, world-music, and other genres in which tonal traditions have been sustained or have undergone a significant revival in recent decades. Some post-minimalist works employ medieval and other genres associated with early music, such as the "Oi me lasso" and other laude of Gavin Bryars.

The historicist movement is closely related to the emergence of musicology and the early music revival. A number of historicist composers have been influenced by their intimate familiarity with the instrumental practices of earlier periods (Hendrik Bouman, Grant Colburn, Michael Talbot, Paulo Galvão, Roman Turovsky-Savchuk). The musical historicism movement has also been stimulated by the formation of such international organizations as the Delian Society and Vox Saeculorum.

==== Art rock influence ====
Some composers have emerged since the 1980s who are influenced by art rock, for example, Rhys Chatham.

==== New Complexity ====
New Complexity is a current within today's European contemporary avant-garde music scene, named in reaction to the New Simplicity. Amongst the candidates suggested for having coined the term are the composer Nigel Osborne, the Belgian musicologist Harry Halbreich, and the British/Australian musicologist Richard Toop, who gave currency to the concept of a movement with his article "Four Facets of the New Complexity".

Though often atonal, highly abstract, and dissonant in sound, the "New Complexity" is most readily characterized by the use of techniques which require complex musical notation. This includes extended techniques, microtonality, odd tunings, highly disjunct melodic contour, innovative timbres, complex polyrhythms, unconventional instrumentations, abrupt changes in loudness and intensity, and so on. The diverse group of composers writing in this style includes Richard Barrett, Brian Ferneyhough, Claus-Steffen Mahnkopf, James Dillon, Michael Finnissy, James Erber, and Roger Redgate.

==== Ambient music and its crossovers ====
Modern ambient music blends classical, electronic, and minimalism, driven by artists like Jon Hopkins, Erland Cooper, Max Richter, Richard D. James, Ludovico Einaudi, Nils Frahm, Ólafur Arnalds, Lambert, Joep Beving, and Hania Rani. Influenced by Brian Eno and Steve Reich, this genre, sometimes called "neo-classical" or "indie classical", merges cinematic orchestration with electronic textures, appealing to a broader audience.

Labels like Erased Tapes Records, New Amsterdam Records, and 130701 have played a key role in this movement, while BBC Radio 3 and BBC Radio 6 Music have promoted its popularity. Programs by Ólafur Arnalds and Mary Anne Hobbs highlight the fusion of ambient, classical, and experimental soundscapes.

== Developments by medium ==
=== Opera ===
Notable composers of operas since 1975 include:

- Michel van der Aa
- Mark Adamo
- John Adams
- Thomas Adès
- Miguel del Águila
- Bruce Adolphe
- Robert Ashley
- Lera Auerbach
- Gerald Barry
- George Benjamin
- Tim Benjamin
- Luciano Berio
- Michael Berkeley
- Oscar Bianchi
- Harrison Birtwistle
- Antonio Braga
- Rudolf Brucci
- John Cage
- Roberto Carnevale
- Elliott Carter
- Daniel Catán
- Tom Cipullo
- Azio Corghi
- John Corigliano
- Michael Daugherty
- Peter Maxwell Davies
- Julius Eastman
- John Eaton
- Oscar Edelstein
- Marios Joannou Elia
- Péter Eötvös
- Mohammed Fairouz
- Brian Ferneyhough
- Lorenzo Ferrero
- Luca Francesconi
- Philip Glass
- Elliot Goldenthal
- Ricky Ian Gordon
- Airat Ichmouratov
- Dae-Ho Eom
- Daron Hagen
- Jake Heggie
- Hans Werner Henze
- Bern Herbolsheimer
- York Höller
- Giselher Klebe
- Helmut Lachenmann
- Lori Laitman
- André Laporte
- György Ligeti
- Liza Lim
- David T. Little
- Luca Lombardi
- Missy Mazzoli
- Richard Meale
- Olivier Messiaen
- Robert Moran
- Nico Muhly
- Olga Neuwirth
- Luigi Nono
- Per Nørgård
- Michael Nyman
- Michael Obst
- Jocy de Oliveira
- Marcus Paus
- Henri Pousseur
- Kevin Puts
- Einojuhani Rautavaara
- Kaija Saariaho
- Aulis Sallinen
- Carol Sams
- David Sawer
- Howard Shore
- Louis Siciliano
- Karlheinz Stockhausen
- Somtow Sucharitkul
- Josef Tal
- Stefano Vagnini
- Claude Vivier
- Judith Weir
- Jörg Widmann
- Mikel Rouse

=== Cinema and television ===
Notable composers of post-1945 classical film and television scores include:

- Michael Abels
- Masamichi Amano
- Craig Armstrong
- John Barry
- Elmer Bernstein
- Howard Blake
- Bruce Broughton
- Tyler Bates
- Christophe Beck
- Lorne Balfe
- David Buckley
- Aaron Copland
- Patrick Doyle
- John Debney
- Mychael Danna
- Alexandre Desplat
- Jeff Danna
- Ramin Djawadi
- Richard Einhorn
- Danny Elfman
- Ludovico Einaudi
- Ilan Eshkeri
- Brad Fiedel
- Robert Folk
- Benjamin Frankel
- Takeshi Furukawa
- Harry Gregson-Williams
- Rupert Gregson-Williams
- Michael Giacchino
- Mick Giacchino
- Ernest Gold
- Elliot Goldenthal
- Jerry Goldsmith
- Joel Goldsmith
- Ludwig Göransson
- Bernard Herrmann
- Yoshihisa Hirano
- Joe Hisaishi
- James Horner
- Akira Ifukube
- Shin'ichirō Ikebe
- Henry Jackman
- Steve Jablonsky
- Maurice Jarre
- Michael Kamen
- Aram Khachaturian
- Wojciech Kilar
- Alan Menken
- Mark Mothersbaugh
- Mark Mancina
- Trevor Morris
- Bear McCreary
- Ennio Morricone
- Randy Newman
- James Newton Howard
- David Newman
- Thomas Newman
- Alex North
- John Powell
- Riopy
- Leonard Rosenman
- Nino Rota
- Miklós Rózsa
- Alfred Schnittke
- Howard Shore
- Dmitri Shostakovich
- Alan Silvestri
- Lalo Schifrin
- Tōru Takemitsu
- Dimitri Tiomkin
- Brian Tyler
- Pinar Toprak
- Joseph Trapanese
- Ralph Vaughan Williams
- William Walton
- Franz Waxman
- John Williams
- Benjamin Wallfisch
- Junkie XL
- Hans Zimmer

Contemporary classical music originally written for the concert hall can also be heard on the music track of some films, such as Stanley Kubrick's 2001: A Space Odyssey (1968) and Eyes Wide Shut (1999), both of which used concert music by György Ligeti, and also in Kubrick's The Shining (1980) which used music by both Ligeti and Krzysztof Penderecki. Jean-Luc Godard, in La Chinoise (1967), Nicolas Roeg in Walkabout (1971), and the Brothers Quay in In Absentia (2000) used music by Karlheinz Stockhausen.

=== Chamber ===
Some notable works for chamber orchestra:

- Composition for Twelve Instruments (1948, rev. 1954) – Milton Babbitt
- Concerto for seven wind instruments, timpani, percussion, and string orchestra (1949) – Frank Martin
- Drei Lieder (1950) – Karlheinz Stockhausen
- Nummer 2 (1951) – Karel Goeyvaerts
- Oiseaux exotiques (1956) – Olivier Messiaen
- Requiem for strings (1957) – Tōru Takemitsu
- Threnody to the Victims of Hiroshima (1960) – Krzysztof Penderecki
- Double Concerto for harpsichord and piano with two chamber orchestras (1961) – Elliott Carter
- Stop (1965) – Karlheinz Stockhausen
- Fantasia for Strings (1966) – Hans Werner Henze
- Ojikawa (1968) – Claude Vivier
- Concerto for clarinet and vibraphone with six instrumental formations (1968) – Jean Barraqué
- Ramifications (1968–69) – György Ligeti
- Black Angels (1970) – George Crumb
- Compases para preguntas ensimismadas (1970) – Hans Werner

Henze

- Recital I (for Cathy) (1972) – Luciano Berio
- Trois airs pour un opéra imaginaire (1982) – Claude Vivier
- Guitar Concerto No. 2 for guitar and strings (1985) – Alan Hovhaness
- Invocation for Oboe and Guitar (1993) – Apostolos Paraskevas
- Kol-Od (1996) – Luciano Berio
- Asko Concerto (2000) – Elliott Carter
- Dialogues for piano and chamber orchestra (2003) – Elliott Carter
- Fünf Sternzeichen (2004) – Karlheinz Stockhausen
- Fünf weitere Sternzeichen (2007) – Karlheinz Stockhausen
- Diário das Narrativas Fantásticas (2019) – Caio Facó

=== Concert bands (wind ensembles) ===
In recent years, many composers have composed for concert bands (also called wind ensembles). Notable composers include:

- James Barnes
- Leslie Bassett
- David Bedford
- Richard Rodney Bennett
- Warren Benson
- Steven Bryant
- Daniel Bukvich
- Mark Camphouse
- Michael Colgrass
- John Corigliano
- Michael Daugherty
- David Del Tredici
- Thomas C. Duffy
- Eric Ewazen
- Aldo Rafael Forte
- Michael Gandolfi
- David Gillingham
- Julie Giroux
- Peter Graham
- Donald Grantham
- Edward Gregson
- John Harbison
- Samuel Hazo
- Kenneth Hesketh
- Karel Husa
- Yasuhide Ito
- Scott Lindroth
- Scott McAllister
- W. Francis McBeth
- James MacMillan
- Cindy McTee
- David Maslanka
- Nicholas Maw
- John Mackey
- Johan de Meij
- Olivier Messiaen
- Lior Navok
- Ron Nelson
- Carter Pann
- Vincent Persichetti
- Marco Pütz
- Alfred Reed
- Steven Reineke
- Rolf Rudin
- Richard L. Saucedo
- Gunther Schuller
- Joseph Schwantner
- Robert W. Smith
- Philip Sparke
- Jack Stamp
- James M. Stephenson
- Karlheinz Stockhausen
- Steven Stucky
- Frank Ticheli
- Michael Tippett
- Jan Van der Roost
- Dan Welcher
- Eric Whitacre
- Dana Wilson
- Guy Woolfenden
- Charles Rochester Young

== Festivals ==
The following is an incomplete list of contemporary-music festivals:

- Ars Musica, Brussels, Belgium
- Bang on a Can Marathon
- Big Ears Festival
- Cabrillo Festival of Contemporary Music in Santa Cruz, California
- Darmstädter Ferienkurse
- Donaueschingen Festival
- Festival Atempo in Caracas, Venezuela
- Gaudeamus Foundation Music Week in Amsterdam
- George Enescu Festival in Romania
- Huddersfield Contemporary Music Festival
- Lucerne Festival in Switzerland
- MATA Festival in New York
- Music Biennale Zagreb
- Musica (French music festival)
- New Music Gathering
- November Music in 's Hertogenbosch (the Netherlands)
- Other Minds in San Francisco
- Peninsula Arts Contemporary Music Festival, Plymouth
- Warsaw Autumn in Poland
- Wittener Tage für neue Kammermusik

== See also ==
- List of contemporary classical ensembles
- Neue Musik

== Notes ==
=== Sources ===
- Anderson, Martin (June 1992). "A Conversation with Kalevi Aho". Tempo. new series (181 (Scandinavian Issue)): 16–18. doi:10.1017/S0040298200015138.
- Bandur, Markus (2001). Aesthetics of Total Serialism: Contemporary Research from Music to Architecture. Basel, Boston, Berlin: Birkhäuser. ISBN 3-7643-6449-1.
- Botstein, Leon (2001). "Modernism". In Stanley Sadie; John Tyrrell (eds.). The New Grove Dictionary of Music and Musicians (second ed.). London: Macmillan.
- Chatham, Rhys. 1994. "Composer's Notebook 1990: Toward a Musical Agenda for the Nineties", with "Postscript, Summer 1994". Rhys Chatham website. (Accessed 20 January 2010)
- Colburn, Grant (Summer 2007). "A New Baroque Revival". Early Music America. 13 (2): 36–45, 54–55.
- Holmes, Thomas B. (2008). Electronic and Experimental Music: Pioneers in Technology and Composition (3rd ed.). London and New York: Routledge. ISBN 978-0-415-95781-6.
- Johnson, Stephen (2001). "MacMillan, James (Loy)". In Stanley Sadie; John Tyrrell (eds.). The New Grove Dictionary of Music and Musicians (second ed.). London: Macmillan.
- Manning, Peter (2004). Electronic and Computer Music (revised and expanded ed.). Oxford and New York: Oxford University Press. ISBN 0-19-514484-8.
- Schwartz, Elliott; Godfrey, Daniel (1993). Music Since 1945: Issues, Materials, and Literature. New York; Toronto: Schirmer; Maxwell Macmillan Canada. ISBN 0-02-873040-2.
- Schwartz, Elliott (Summer 1994). "European Journal, 1993". Perspectives of New Music. 32 (2): 292–299. doi:10.2307/833614. JSTOR 833614.
- Straus, Joseph. N. (Autumn 1999). "The Myth of Serial 'Tyranny' in the 1950s and 1960s". The Musical Quarterly. 83 (3): 301–343. doi:10.1093/mq/83.3.301.
- Toop, Richard (March 1988). "Four Facets of the 'New Complexity'". Contact: A Journal for Contemporary Music (32): 4–8. doi:10.25602/GOLD.cj.v0i32.1284.
- Watkins, Glenn (1994). Pyramids at the Louvre: Music, Culture, and Collage from Stravinsky to the Postmodernists. Cambridge, Massachusetts: Belknap Press of Harvard University Press. ISBN 0-674-74083-1.
- Whittall, Arnold (2001). "Neo-Classicism". Grove Music Online. doi:10.1093/gmo/9781561592630.article.19723. (Subscription access)
