= Ian Pace =

British pianist

Ian Geoffrey Pace (born 1968 in Hartlepool) is a British pianist and musicologist, who is Professor of Music, Culture and Society at City University, London. Pace studied at Chetham's School of Music, The Queen's College, Oxford and the Juilliard School in New York. His main teacher was the Hungarian pianist György Sándor.

== Repertoire ==
Pace is particularly well known for playing music of the 20th and 21st centuries, especially contemporary British, French, German and Italian music. Premieres he has given include works by Richard Barrett, Luc Brewaeys, Aaron Cassidy, James Clarke, Raymond Deane, James Dillon, Gordon Downie, Pascal Dusapin, Richard Emsley, James Erber, Brian Ferneyhough, Michael Finnissy, Christopher Fox, Volker Heyn, Wieland Hoban, Evan Johnson, Hilda Paredes, Horațiu Rădulescu, Frederic Rzewski, Howard Skempton, Gerhard Stäbler, Serge Verstockt, Jay Alan Yim and Walter Zimmermann.

His huge repertoire also includes more established works by Pierre Boulez, Karlheinz Stockhausen, Jean Barraqué, Iannis Xenakis, György Ligeti, Luigi Nono, Mauricio Kagel and John Cage, among others, as well as most of the standard repertoire from Ludwig van Beethoven through to Béla Bartók. In 1996 he gave a large-scale six-concert series of the complete piano works of Michael Finnissy, and in 2001 he premiered the same composer's five-and-a-half-hour The History of Photography in Sound, which he later recorded. He regularly performs together with the Arditti Quartet, and is also artistic director of the ensemble Topologies.

== Recordings ==
He has played in 20 countries, including at most major European festivals, and has recorded numerous CDs for the Black Box, Hat Art, Métier, Mode, Naïve, NMC and Stradivarius labels, including discs of Dusapin, Finnissy, Fox, Zimmermann and the new complexity disc Tracts. From 2003 to 2006 he was AHRC Creative and Performing Arts Research Fellow at the University of Southampton. From 2007 to 2010 he was lecturer in Musicology at Dartington College of Arts and in 2010 took up a lecturership at City University, London, where he is currently Professor of Music, Culture and Society. He has written widely on music, co-editing and contributing large chapters to Uncommon Ground: The Music of Michael Finnissy (Aldershot: Ashgate, 1998), as well as publishing articles on Barrett, Cage, Pascal Dusapin, Fox, Kagel, Helmut Lachenmann, Franz Liszt, Salvatore Sciarrino, Howard Skempton and Xenakis.

== Music theory ==
As a musicologist, his areas of speciality are 19th-century performance practice, music and society, the work of Theodor Adorno, and post-1945 modernism.
