= ELISION Ensemble =

- Origin: Australia
- Genres: Contemporary classical music chamber ensemble
- Years active: 1986–present
- Members: Daryl Buckley (artistic director)
- Website: elision.org.au

The ELISION Ensemble (often referred to as simply ELISION) is a chamber ensemble specialising in contemporary classical music, concentrating on the creation and presentation of new works. The ensemble comprises a core of around 20 virtuoso musicians from Australia and around the world.

Since 1986 it has maintained an active schedule of concerts, recordings, broadcasts, and music-theatre/opera, installation art and new media art performances, principally in Australia and Europe. During 2008 the ensemble presented 36 individual works, including 11 world premieres, in 18 concerts or events in Melbourne, Sydney, Brisbane, Berlin and London. Its 18th compact disc was released in 2009 (see § Discography).

ELISION combines its Australian perspective with a long-term exploration of complex musical aesthetics, and in so doing has developed an international reputation for Australian new music and performance practice. Paul Griffiths, in Modern Music and After, writes of ELISION, "whose splendiferous range of colours ... has produced a kind of sensuous complexity that may be uniquely Australian".

In 2018, the ensemble toured internationally to Germany and Mexico as well as performing in Australia in Melbourne, Brisbane, and Sydney.

== Aesthetics ==
ELISION's musical aesthetic is at the complex and virtuosic end of the contemporary classical compositional spectrum. A strong element of this music is the sheer difficulty of its performance; multiple compositional layers, complex and heavily detailed musical notation pose significant interpretative challenges. Interplay between the resultant unpredictabilities and performative decisions required by complex multi-layered and paradoxical strands of information embedded in notational practice can lead to a frustration for the player, or to a fascination born of engagement in the act of "what it is to make music". The latter is a key aspect for the members of ELISION; a further is the physicality of performance, the intimate connection between the musician and the instrument.

"The ELISION ensemble ... celebrated its 10th birthday with a characteristic sequence of salto mortale items, proving yet again that 'impossible' is a relative word. Its repertoire, once relatively eclectic, has now become sharply focused: both technically and aesthically, it specialises in 'tough cookies'. Typically, though not exclusively, these tend to be rhythmically highly complex, with dense webs of wide-flung micro-tonal melodies, and the same horror of rests that one finds in Fauré's later chamber works. In such a context, even a new cello solo by Stockhausen (Violoncello aus Orchester—Finalisten) sounded meek and mild."

The ensemble has commissioned and premiered new works from Richard Barrett, Chris Dench, Brian Ferneyhough, James Dillon, Michael Finnissy, Aaron Cassidy, Evan Johnson, Timothy McCormack, Jeroen Speak, and others associated with the so-called New Complexity movement. A very long-term collaborator is Australian composer Liza Lim who has written three operas and over twenty smaller works for ELISION and its members. Other composers who have written for the ensemble include Franco Donatoni, Aldo Clementi, Karlheinz Essl, Volker Heyn, Richard Rijnvos and Australians John Rodgers, Timothy O'Dwyer, Dominik Karski, David Young, Brendan Colbert, Michael Barkl and Michael Smetanin.

== Cross-artform events ==
Beyond its traditional concert-giving activity, a distinguishing aspect of ELISION's work had been the creation of new cross-artform events, combining musical performance with the visual and sonic arts, including new media, but particularly installation art. Examples include Opening of the Mouth (composer Richard Barrett, installation artist Richard Crow; Perth, Western Australia, 1997), Sonorous Bodies (composer Liza Lim, video artist Judith Wright; Brisbane 1999 and Berlin 2001), or Dark Matter (Barrett and Norwegian installation artist Per Inge Bjørlo; Brisbane 2002 and Berlin 2003). These works stem from close collaboration between composer, visual artist, sound artist and musicians, and frequently occur in musically unusual locations (disused power stations, old railway workshops, backstage, galleries), and create a "total art work" aiming to envelop the audience visually as well as sonically.

"ELISION constructs itself not so much as a concert-performing ensemble but as a vehicle for the creation of unique and thought–provoking artistic statements ... ELISION projects are ones with which one mentally carries on an argument long after the event. ELISION is a mouth."

"The Welsh composer Richard Barrett entreated an excursion into the black holes of the universe. On stools and benches welded from steel tubes in the Norwegian Per Inge Bjørlo's environment, you had the impression of being in a forest of grabbing arms. Conducted from a spaceship's cockpit, one hears the musicians of the Australian ELISION Ensemble partly shielded behind steel cages."

ELISION's activity in music theatre/opera production, most recently The Navigator (composer Liza Lim, director Barrie Kosky; Brisbane and Melbourne 2008, Moscow and Paris 2009), can be viewed as a continuation of an artistic relationship which began in 1993 with performances of The Oresteia(Melbourne 1993).

Beyond notated music, ELISION has also maintained a strong thread of structured improvisation performance, often within cross-artform events, such as the seven-night long Bar-do'i-thos-grol (The Tibetan Book of the Dead) (composer Liza Lim, installation artist Domenico de Clario; Lismore 1994 and Perth 1995) (described as "one of the most astonishing creations in recent Australian music performance"). The use of improvisation as a creative laboratory to generate sonic understandings, subsequently informing more formal processes, has occurred with composers Richard Barrett and John Rodgers, and recently in What Remains (composer/performers John Butcher and Timothy O'Dwyer; Brisbane 2007).

== History ==
ELISION was established in Melbourne, Australia in 1986 by its current Artistic Director Daryl Buckley and other musicians from the Victorian College of the Arts; several founding members remain in the ensemble. While resident in Melbourne it built an international reputation, making its first European appearance in 1991. In 1996 it relocated its administrative base to the University of Queensland, Brisbane, and was a resident company at the Judith Wright Centre of Contemporary Arts in Brisbane from its opening in 2001 until 2008.

ELISION has received government funding from arts councils including the Australia Council, Arts Victoria and Arts Queensland. The ensemble has also secured funding from government and private sources in Europe, particularly to commission new work. ELISION is operated by a not-for-profit incorporated association, whose membership is dominated by musicians in the ensemble.

== Current membership ==
Deborah Kayser (soprano), Genevieve Lacey (recorder), Paula Rae (flute), Peter Veale (oboe), Richard Haynes (clarinet), Carl Rosman (clarinet), Timothy O'Dwyer (saxophone), Ysolt Clark (horn), Tristram Williams (trumpet), Benjamin Marks (trombone), Peter Neville (percussion), Richard Barrett (electronics), Daryl Buckley (electric guitar), Marilyn Nonken (piano), Marshall McGuire (harp), Satsuki Odamura (koto), Graeme Jennings (violinist) (violin), Erkki Veltheim (viola), Séverine Ballon (cello), Joan Wright (double bass).

== Critical acclaim ==
"an uncompromisingly radical attitude to the presentation of the music, treating each piece as a score for a total art work, involving installation artists to design the sets for their performances and taking their audiences on a journey, not only through the music but through the performance space itself."

"ELISION has gone the distance and established itself not only as one of Australia's finest contemporary music ensembles but as an ensemble of international standing"

"Elision is a unique venture with a wonderful record of explorations of cross-cultural and intermedia composition and performance, engagements with architecture, medicine and science, and enjoys a capacity to develop unique and successful international collaborations. It has changed the face of Australian music, not only in its support for talented composers and musicians, but in ways of presenting music for new audiences. Elision has also cleverly developed an international market for its work by commissioning composers from other countries and by partnering overseas ensembles in productions. It has achieved a remarkable touring record."

"Conventional people may choose to stay at home."

"Chris Dench (b. 1953) has become a part of the musical life of Australia, as has Richard Barrett (b. 1959) in works written for the Elision ensemble, whose splendiferous range of colours (with a prominent tuned percussion centre, including angklung, mandolin and guitar, as well as full stretches of winds and strings) has produced a kind of sensuous complexity that may be uniquely Australian."

"What we need is the regular chance to see the other greats of new music—Frankfurt's Ensemble Modern, Paris's Ensemble intercontemporain, Klangforum Wien, Amsterdam's Ives Ensemble, Australia's ELISION Ensemble—to experience other ways of interpreting the greats of the 20th and 21st centuries, and to hear their unique performance practices at the cutting edge."

"From time to time one still comes across the idea that modernist music, by its very nature, is ugly and inexpressive, and that the newly tuneful composers of the last couple of decades have saved the art from going down some blind alley. If evidence were needed to counter that notion, a recent CD of solo works by Brian Ferneyhough (Etcetera KTC 1206), played by the extraordinary musicians of the Australian group Elision, would do the trick."

== Discography ==
Compact discs released by ELISION:

- Elision Ensemble (1992), RCA BMG/Ariola CCD 3011
  Music of Giulio Castagnoli, Chris Dench, Michael Whitticker, Brendan Colbert
- Driftglass (1992), ONE-M-ONE Records 1M1CP 1018
  Music of Chris Dench, Liza Lim, Richard Barrett and Alastair MacDonald
- Garden of Earthly Desire (1992), Dischi Ricordi CRMCD 1020
  Music of Liza Lim, Sandro Gorli, Franco Donatoni, Mauro Cardi and Gerard Brophy
- Richard Barrett/Elision Ensemble (1993), Etcetera KTC 1167
  Music of Richard Barrett including the cycle negatives
- The Oresteia (1994), Dischi Ricordi CRMCD 1030
  Memory theatre (opera) by Liza Lim
- Skinless Kiss of Angels (1995), ABC Classics/Under Capricorn 446 625.2
  Music of Michael Smetanin
- After the Fire (1996), Vox Australis VAST 019-2
  Solo music by Richard Hames, Michael Whitticker, Liza Lim, Chris Dench, Allesandro Melchiorre, Timothy O'Dwyer
- the intertwining—the chasm (1998), Institute of Modern Art, ISBN 1-875792-27-9
  Booklet documenting installation-performance works by Domenico De Clario and Liza Lim 1994–1996, with CD of improvisations by ELISION
- Brian Ferneyhough Solo Works (1998), Etcetera KTC 1206
  Music of Brian Ferneyhough
- The Heart's Ear (1999), ABC Classics/Under Capricorn 456 687.2
  Music of Liza Lim
- Opening of the Mouth (2000), ABC Classics/Under Capricorn 465 268.2
  Music of Richard Barrett
- ik(s)land[s] (2005), NMC D089
  Music of Chris Dench
- Transmission (2006), NMC D117
  Music of Richard Barrett
- Aldo Clementi: Works for Guitar (2007), Mode Records 182
  Featuring guitarist Geoffrey Morris
- Negatives (2009), NMC D143
  Music of Richard Barrett. Re-issue of 1993 Etcetera KTC 1167 but including codex I (2001)

Compilation compact discs featuring tracks performed by ELISION:

- Terra Incognita (1994) Dischi Ricordi CRMCD 1027
  Music of Alessandro Melchiorre
- Works by Akira Nishimura (1998), Fontec FOCD 2560
- Shu Hai practices javelin (2002), Mode Records 117
  Music of Chaya Czernowin

== Name ==
The ensemble takes its name from an archaic English usage of the word elision, meaning "a cutting of the air ... as the cause of sound".
