= Omar Ebrahim =

English singer

Omar Ebrahim (born 6 September 1956 in Greasbrough, Rotherham, South Yorkshire) is an English baritone vocalist. He specializes in the performance of contemporary classical music.

He studied voice at the Guildhall School of Music and Drama, then spent a performing apprenticeship at the Royal Shakespeare Company and in the Glyndebourne chorus, performing the role of Schaunard in La bohème for the Glyndebourne Touring Opera in 1980.

He has sung in performances of contemporary operas and other works by Nigel Osborne, Michael Tippett, Harrison Birtwistle, Luciano Berio, Philip Glass, Peter Lieberson, Frank Zappa, György Ligeti, Peter Eötvös, and Michael Nyman. In 1992 he sang the title role in the BBC miniseries The Vampyr: A Soap Opera, an updated version of Heinrich Marschner's opera Der Vampyr. In 2008, he created the role of "The Fool" in Liza Lim's opera The Navigator at the Brisbane Festival. He has also participated in performances of operas by Giacomo Puccini, Giuseppe Verdi, Kurt Weill, Georges Bizet, and Gilbert and Sullivan.

Ebrahim teaches voice at Trinity College of Music in Greenwich, London.
