= Volker Ignaz Schmidt =

Volker Ignaz Schmidt (born 1971 in Leonberg, Germany) is a composer of contemporary music.

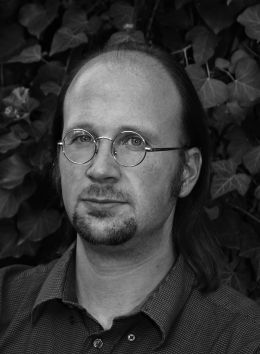
Volker Ignaz Schmidt

Volker Ignaz Schmidt started composing in 1986 and has been a member of different rock and jazz bands playing piano, keyboards, trumpet as well as song writing. He has been studying harmony, counterpoint, form and orchestration since 1993. Since 1995 he has studied composition privately with Franklin Cox (University of Maryland, USA), Bernd Asmus (Freiburg, Germany), Jan Kopp (Stuttgart, Germany) and John Palmer (composer) (University of Hertfordshire, England).

In 2001 he started composing his own music. Volker Ignaz Schmidt has composed solo works, chamber music, vocal pieces, orchestral music and conceptual music. He has written piano textbooks and he worked in school projects on contemporary music.

Schmidt has written music for the <belcanto> Solisten, the New York Miniaturist Ensemble, Franklin Cox, the Art Ensemble Berlin, the Trio Mondala, the duo Christine Simolka/René Wohlhauser and the Frankfurter Tonkünstlerbund. Some of his pieces have been published by the Simon Verlag Berlin and the Bellmann Verlag Halle. His works have been performed in Germany, Belgium, Switzerland, Austria, France, UK, Mexico, Russia and the USA.

== Selected works ==
=== Solo pieces ===
- Ikaros (2004) for cello (commissioned by Franklin Cox)
- Tales from the topographic inside (2007) for piano
- Ma (2011) for prepared harpsichord
- Crossing Paths (2013) for 10string guitar

=== Chamber music ===
- Traumbilder (2007) for flute, guitar & viola (commissioned by the Trio Mondala)
- Adoration (2008) for bassflute & 10string guitar
- String Quartet 2017

=== Orchestra ===
- Aura (2009/2010) 2d2,0,2+es+bass,2+1 - 4,1,3,1, timp, perc, cel, pno, str:12,12,8,8,6
- Sternenstaub (2011) timp, perc, mar, str:11,4,4,3
- EISZEIT (2016) 1d1,1,1+bass,1+bass - 1,2d1(cor),1,1+bass - timp, perc(3), hp, pno - str:4,3,2,2,1

=== Vocal music ===
- Dürrson Lieder (2005) for baritone and piano
- Goya I (2008) for 3 female voices, flute/piccolo & clarinet (commissioned by the Frankfurter Tonkünstlerbund)
- Die Tränen der Eos (2011) for soprano and cello
- Drei Grotesken (2016) for speaker, tenor and percussion

=== Electronic music ===
- Scrunch (2008) for tape
- EISSCHMELZE-soundscape #2 (2016) for trumpet with electronics
- FLEISCH-soundscape #3 (2016) for speaker, e-guitar, e-bass and drum-set with electronics

=== Conceptual music ===
- Traumtagebuch (2015) for any solo instrument
- KlangLandschaft (2015) for any instruments (without conductor)

== Publications ==
- Rezitationen for double-bass Simon Publishers Berlin (2012)
- Klanggemälde and other etudes for piano Bellmann Publishers Halle (2013)
- Poem 2|4|13 for guitar Bellmann Publishers Halle (2014)
- Dürrson Lieder in the edition "Aus der Tiefe der Gesang" Simon Publishers Berlin (2015)
- SPIELE - New piano music for the advanced student Simon Publishers Berlin (2018)
