= Aaron Cassidy =

American composer (born 1976)

Aaron Cassidy (born July 1, 1976) is an American composer.

== Education ==
Cassidy was born in Illinois. He received a Bachelor of Music degree, with distinction, from the Northwestern University Bienen School of Music in Evanston, Illinois, where his main instructors in composition were Jay Alan Yim, Alan Stout, and Michael Pisaro. He went on to study composition with David Felder and Jeffery Stadelman at the State University of New York at Buffalo where he received a Ph.D. in composition in 2003. He also participated in masterclass and lessons with composers including Richard Barrett, Chaya Czernowin, Brian Ferneyhough, Jonathan Harvey, Alvin Lucier, and Tristan Murail, among others.

== Style ==
Cassidy's music exhibits a radical approach to parametric organisation in composition, especially in his solo works, in a manner that he describes as to do with "decoupling". In works such as the ten monophonic miniatures for pianist, he treats the sound of the pianist's fingers on the keys as a separate parameter in the music, and in this and other pieces he incorporates and integrates a wide range of extended instrumental techniques. He is concerned to explore the possibilities of fracturing between different musical parameters, and to defamiliarise aspects of traditional performance practice. Intellectual influences upon his music include the work of Roman Jakobson and that of Gilles Deleuze and Félix Guattari. His work is sometimes associated with the New Complexity.

Cassidy's work has been performed by a wide range of leading contemporary music specialists, including ELISION Ensemble, Ensemble SurPlus, the Ictus Ensemble, the JACK Quartet, the Kairos Quartet, Quatuor Diotima, ensemble recherche, Mieko Kanno, Garth Knox, Ian Pace, Christopher Redgate, Carl Rosman, and Peter Veale, at many venues and festivals including the Gaudeamus International Music Week (where he was a Jurors Prize nominee, in 2002 and 2004), the Huddersfield Contemporary Music Festival, the Bludenzer Tage zeitgemäßer Musik, the Bienal Internacional de Musica y Tecnología (Mexico City), the Samtida Musik Stockholm, the festival June In Buffalo, and the ISCM World Music Days (Zagreb 2005), as well as being broadcast by radio stations in Britain, France, Germany and Austria.

== Writings ==
Cassidy has also written articles for New Music and Aesthetics in the 21st Century and is currently preparing an article on the compositional pedagogy of Michael Finnissy. He also works as a conductor and organist, and acts as conductor and pianist for Augenmusik, a Buffalo-based ensemble specializing in the performance of graphic scores and works in open form, frequently for unusual instrumentations. He has also worked recently as a CD producer, particularly for EXAUDI Vocal Ensemble in their discs of the music of Michael Finnissy, Christopher Fox, and Howard Skempton, which were released on the NMC label.

In 2005, Cassidy was appointed to the composition faculty of the Bienen School of Music at Northwestern University, where he taught and was also responsible for organizing the New Music Northwestern concert series. He was formerly a visiting assistant professor of music at Buffalo State College.

He joined the faculty of the University of Huddersfield in 2007 as senior lecturer in composition.
