= James Clarke (composer) =

English composer (born 1957)

James Clarke (born October 1957) is an English composer sometimes associated with the New Complexity school and the piece 'Relaxed Scene.' According to fellow English composer and music scholar Christopher Fox, in The New Grove Dictionary of Music and Musicians, "After studying at Southampton University and City University, London, [Clarke] was awarded a Finnish Government Scholarship to study composition with Usko Meriläinen in Helsinki." In 1979, with his colleague Richard Emsley, Clarke co-founded the new music ensemble, Suoraan, "a small band of outstanding specialist performers" based in London "which dedicatedly promoted the music of, centrally, Iannis Xenakis but also younger British and European composers such as Michael Finnissy and James Dillon." Yet, as Christopher Fox points out, "for much of his career [Clarke's] work has attracted most attention beyond the British Isles, including significant performances at the International Gaudeamus Music Week and the ISCM World Music Days."

Fox relates further:

From 1994 to 1997[,] he was Composer-in-Residence at Queen's University, Belfast, where, as artistic director of the Sonorities Festival of new music, his programmes were notable for their advocacy of recent music from the rest of Europe. Clarke's own aesthetic is far closer to this music than to prevailing fashions in metropolitan English new music. He argues that "it is not the role of new art gently to massage the ears" and his work is indeed often aurally abrasive, pushing instruments to timbral extremes. Dualities abound: ensembles split apart to form opposing factions; forms often divide, the second part sometimes – as in "La violenza delle idee" (1991) – a fractured attempt to recreate the first, sometimes – as in "Independence" (1988) – a distillation of the first. Early works evolve from silence by a process of accretion in which the music assembles its history before our ears; in "Broken" (1988) and subsequent works the fundamental metaphor is that of decomposition, the creative process leaving its trace on a body of possible material like acid biting into an etching plate.

According to his official biography, Clarke has been "a visiting professor at universities in various countries, including Azerbaijan, where he was appointed an honorary Professor of Music at the Baku Music Academy; Russia, at the Moscow Conservatoire[;] and Sweden, at the University of Malmö." In addition, he "has led composition courses at the Time of Music Festival in Viitasaari, Finland, where he was featured composer in 2000, and at the Festival junger Künstler Bayreuth." He was also "a featured composer at the 2004 Ars Musica festival in Brussels, where ten works were performed in the largest survey of Clarke’s music to date [2007]."

== Works ==
"Over one hundred works for symphony orchestra, ensembles, voices or solo musicians", including

- "String Quartet" (2003), written for the Arditti Quartet, commissioned jointly by the Huddersfield Festival and Ars Musica, Brussels
- "Final Dance" (2003), written for Klangforum Wien, commissioned by Southwest German Radio for the Donaueschinger Musiktage;
- "Landschaft mit Glockenturm II" (2003), for seventeen European and Chinese instruments, commissioned by the Viennese organisation Asian Culture Link.

Collaboration with Harold Pinter commissioned by the BBC

- Voices (2005), "a large-scale work for nine actors, solo musicians and orchestra, with a text specially written by Harold Pinter," first broadcast on BBC Radio 3, in honor of Pinter's 75th birthday, on 10 October 2005.

Other commissions from, among others

- French Ministry of Culture
- Beethovenfest
- Gaudeamus Foundation
- Dresdner Zentrum für zeitgenössische Musik
- Musik i Skåne
- University of Cambridge

Portrait concerts given by

- MusikFabrik NRW
- Apartment House
- Ensemble SurPlus
- Prometheus Ensemble

Recent works, all untitled, including

- "Untitled No.1", a work for eighteen instruments written for Klangforum Wien and premiered in Vienna in early 2007;
- "Untitled No.3" for solo piano, written for Nicolas Hodges and premiered at the Huddersfield Festival in 2006;
- "Untitled No.4" for the Hilliard Ensemble and the Arditti Quartet, commissioned by the Beethovenfest Bonn, in 2007;
- "2006-K" for 21 instruments, also written for Klangforum Wien and premiered at the Venice Biennale in 2006;
- "2007-R" for two percussionists, premiered at the Transit Festival in Leuven, Belgium, in 2007.

== Recordings ==
- James Clarke (CD) from Zeitklang.
- Trio Fibonacci – Independence Quadrilles (CD and downloadable MP3) from NMC Recordings (UK). NMC D107.

== Critical reception ==
Describing his "String Quartet" commissioned for the Arditti Quartet, The Globe and Mail states: "James Clarke's 'String Quartet' was obsessive chiefly in its manner, which was that of someone determined to break through to a new sound, a new feeling, a new zone in the psyche. The piece seethed and glittered, bursting from silence with pungent tutti respirations, arraying its speedy surface melodies (whether heard as tune, ornament or symptom) like broken glass. It was rock music by other means...."

Concerning the same work, The Toronto Star observes: "The music pulsed with fabulous rhythmic and tonal effects that the Ardittis shaped into palpable 3-D soundscapes. Clarke's mastery of dissonance and overtone, aided by the Ardittis' playing, created sound waves that are not usually heard in a quartet program."

== Awards ==
- 1992 – Kranichsteiner Musikpreis for composition at the Darmstädter Ferienkurse für Neue Musik.

== See also ==
- Minimalism
- New Complexity
