= Arthur Kampela =

Brazilian-American composer

Arthur Kampela is a Brazilian-American composer, guitarist, and songwriter.

== Compositions ==
Though Kampela has been associated with the New Complexity movement, his style evolves out of extreme extended-technique improvisational practices which remap the ergonomics of one instrument onto another (percussion onto guitar, or guitar onto viola).

An important aspect of Kampela's music is his development of micro-metric modulation, a formula for precisely controlled transition from any polyrhythm to any other polyrhythm, without either of the tempos of the respective polyrhythms being directly related. (He has also participated in activities that revive the theories and practices of Swiss-Brazilian musician Walter Smetak.) Kampela's rhythmic and timbral techniques are sometimes framed by a reference to Theatre of the Absurd and combined with electronics.

Another aspect of Kampela's music is the fusion of vernacular Brazilian roots (bossa novas and samba) with subversive wordplay lyrics and atonal harmonies, which can be heard in his 1988 LP Epopéia e Graça de uma Raça em Desencanto… (‘Epic and Grace…’) Although the 1988 album is of a more vernacular-popular genre, Kampela's later compositional style grows organically out of his earlier practices as a composer-guitarist-singer as represented on this album. As Alejandro L. Madrid puts it:

"Brazilian Arthur Kampela developed a personal language that reads popular and traditional Brazilian music styles, genres, and techniques through the aesthetics of New Complexity and Elliott Carter’s notion of metric modulation, including his series of Percussion Studies for solo guitar."

Kampela's compositions, particular his Percussion Studies for Guitar, have been performed numerous times around the world (North America, South America, Europe, and Asia), resulting in dozens of renditions on YouTube, at the Tanglewood Contemporary Music Festival, the Austrian Cultural Forum New York, and by ensembles such as the New York Philharmonic, Ensemble Linea, Momenta Quartet, Tokyo Gen'On Project, Kammerensemble Neue Musik Berlin, and Ensemble Modern.

== Career ==
Kampela has taught composition at Columbia University, New York University, Bates College, and Escola de Música da UFRJ (Federal University of Rio de Janeiro).

== Awards and Commissions ==
- Guggenheim Fellowship 2014
- DAAD Artists-in-Berlin Program 2012-13
- Fromm Foundation grant
- International Guitar Composition Competition (Caracas, Venezuela) 1995
- Lamarque-Pons Guitar Composition Competition (Montevideo, Uruguay) 1998
- New York Guitar Festival 2008

== Education ==
Kampela attended Conservatório Brasileiro de Música, Centro Universitário, then Manhattan School of Music where he studied with Ursula Mamlok. He continued his studies at Columbia University, principally with Mario Davidovsky and Fred Lerdahl, and earned a DMA (1998) degree. (He also studied privately with Brian Ferneyhough in 1993.)

== Selected works ==
- Percussion Studies for Guitar, Nos. 1, 2, and 3
- A Knife all Blade, [uma faca só lâmina - after Joao Cabral] (string quartet)
- Phalanges, for solo harp (1995)
- Macunaíma, for orchestra
- Happy Days, for solo flute and electronics
- Exoskeleton, for solo viola
- Naked Singularity, for solo tuba
- ...tak-tak...tak...
- Antropofagia, for electric guitar and large ensemble
- Between Fingers and Mouth (2022)

== Publications ==
- "Micro-Metric Rhythms and Noises Emanations from the Stochastic Cloud", In Sharon Kanak (ed.) Xenakis Matters, New York: Pendragon Press: 341–362
- "The Exile of the Metric in the Dance of Pulsation", 2020, Journal MusMat, 4(1): 63–80
- "A Knife All Blade: Deciding the Side Not To Take", Current Musicology, 67/68: 167–193.

== Listening ==
- Percussion Study 2 for Guitar (1990), Marisa Minder, guitar
- Percussion Study 1 for Guitar (1990), Gian Marco Ciampa, guitar
- Percussion Study 1 for Guitar (1990), Rob MacDonald, guitar
- Percussion Study 1 for Guitar (1990), Rémi Jousselme, guitar
- Between Fingers and Mouth, quintet, (2022) (world premiere)
- Phalanges (1995,) Jacqui Kerod, harp
