= Carl Rosman =

Australian musician and conductor

Carl Rosman is an Australian clarinettist, singer and conductor.

Rosman studied with Phillip Miechel in Melbourne, then with Peter Jenkin at the Sydney Conservatorium of Music. He has performed in Europe, Asia, Australasia and both North and South America as a soloist.

He is closely associated with composers such as Brian Ferneyhough, Michael Finnissy, Richard Barrett, Chris Dench and Liza Lim, as well as frequently performing such composers as Pierre Boulez, Helmut Lachenmann and Vinko Globokar. He is also a conductor and co-director of the ensemble Libra, as well a member of the ELISION Ensemble. He also often performs works involving singing and spoken text; Richard Barrett's work Interference exploits both his vocal and clarinet-playing abilities, and he gave the premiere of Aaron Cassidy's work for solo voice, I, purples, spat blood, laugh of beautiful lips. He has also performed concerts featuring nineteenth-century melodrama works for speaker and piano, notably with pianists Mark Knoop and Ian Pace and sung lieder by Schubert and Schumann. He has recorded for ETCETERA, NMC, and ABC Classics. He has also written on music for periodicals.

He lives in Cologne where he is a member of the ensemble musikFabrik.
