= Richard Emsley =

British composer

Richard Emsley (born December 1951 in Goole, Yorkshire) is a British composer, sometimes associated with the New Complexity school.

Emsley initially studied with Arnold Whittall at University College, Cardiff, after which he moved to London, where he still lives. He attended Peter Maxwell Davies' composition classes at the Dartington Summer School of Music, and co-founded the Cardiff Composers' Ensemble while a student there. In the 1970s he co-founded, with James Clarke, the ensemble Suoraan, which specialised in performances of music by contemporary composers, including Iannis Xenakis, Michael Finnissy and James Dillon.

In 2002, Métier released a CD of Emsley's music, entitled Flowforms.

In addition to composing, Emsley works as a music engraver. He was the first ever user of the notation software Sibelius, having tested it extensively before it was released, and engraved the first score published using Sibelius: Antara by George Benjamin (published by Faber Music).

== List of works ==
- The lunar silences, the silent tide lapping... (1973) for flute, clarinet, percussion (4 players), piano and violin
- Hologenesis (1978) for solo clarinet
- At Once (1979) for flute (doubling alto flute), oboe (doubling oboe d'amore & cor anglais), vibraphone and piano
- Snatches (1979) for flute (doubling piccolo & alto flute), oboe (doubling cor anglais), vibraphone, and piano
- Skhistos (1980) for flute, oboe, vibraphone and piano
- The Juniper Tree (1981) for shadow puppet theatre (or animated film) and ensemble
- Helter-Skelter (1981) for flute, vibraphone and piano
- Cut/Dissolve (1984) for solo percussion
- ...from swerve of shore to bend of bay... (1984–85) for alto flute (doubling piccolo), bass clarinet (doubling e-flat clarinet), percussion, piano, viola and cello
- Flow Form (1986–87) for solo piano
- Tidal Volume I (1989) for solo harpsichord
- finnissys fifty (1996) for solo piano
- Little Sunderings (1996) for solo piano
- for piano 1 (1997) for solo piano
- for piano 2 (1997) for solo piano
- for piano 3 (1997) for solo piano
- for piano 4 (1997) for solo piano
- for piano 5 (1998) for solo piano
- for guitar 1 (1998) for solo guitar
- for piano 6 (1999) for solo piano
- for piano 7 (1999) for solo piano
- for piano 8 (1999) for solo piano
- for piano 9 (1999) for solo piano
- for piano 10 (1999) for solo piano
- for piano 11 (1999) for solo piano
- for piano 12 (1999) for solo piano
- invention 1 on the name james dillon (2001) for two vibraphones
- invention 2 on the name james dillon (2001) for solo vibraphone
- Still/s 1 (2002) for solo cello
- Still/s 22 (2002) for clarinet and piano
- Still/s 14 (2003) for solo violin
- for piano 13 (2000–03) for solo piano
- Still/s 2 (2004) for clarinet and cello
- for piano 14 (2004) for solo piano
- Still/s 10 (2004) for flute and piano
- Still/s 3 (2004) for violin and cello
- Piano with violin (2005) for violin and piano
- for piano 15 (2005) for solo piano

== Recordings ==
- Emsley: Flowforms Mikel Toms, Topologies Ensemble Metier CD MTI 92044
