= Abiya =

Abiya may refer to:

- Abiya, a form of the first name Abijah
- Abiya, 1994 piano work by James Erber
- Abiya, producer of hexamethylenetetramine in Mexico
- ABiYA, collective name of Four Worlds, the spiritual realms in Kabbalah
