= Historicism (disambiguation) =

Historicism is an approach to explaining social and cultural phenomena by studying their history. It may also refer to:

- Historicism (art), a school of art and architecture
- Historicism (Christianity), a method of interpreting the Book of Revelation
- Musical historicism
