= Roger Redgate =

British conductor and composer

Roger Redgate (born 1958) is a British composer, conductor and improvisor. Born in Bolton, he began his musical training at Chetham's School of Music in Manchester, then attended the Royal College of Music where he studied with Edwin Roxburgh and Lawrence Casserley. Under a DAAD (German Academic Exchange) scholarship he also studied with Brian Ferneyhough and Klaus Huber in Freiburg. In 1984, with the new complexity composers Richard Barrett and Michael Finnissy, he co-founded Ensemble Exposé.

Redgate has worked in the fields of jazz, improvised music, film and television. His piano works have been recorded by Nicolas Hodges.

In September 1996 Redgate took up the position of Professor in Composition and Director, Contemporary Music Research at Goldsmiths, University of London. His compositions are published by Editions Henry Lemoine, Paris, United Music Publishers, London and the Associated Board of the Royal Schools of Music.

== Sources ==
- Anon. (n.d.). "Ensemble Exposé". www.rogerredgate.com.
- Barrett, Richard. 1995. "Critical/Convulsive: The Music of Roger Redgate". Contemporary Music Review 13:133–46.
- Fox, Christopher. 2001. "Redgate, Roger (John)". The New Grove Dictionary of Music and Musicians, second edition, edited by Stanley Sadie and John Tyrrell. London: Macmillan Publishers.
