= Shadowtime (opera) =

Opera by Brian Ferneyhough

- Opera by Brian Ferneyhough
- Librettist: Charles Bernstein
- Language: English
- Based on: life of Walter Benjamin
- Premiere: 25 May 2004; Prinzregententheater, Munich Biennale

Shadowtime is the first opera by Brian Ferneyhough, written to an English libretto by Charles Bernstein. The City of Munich commissioned the work in 1999 for the Munich Biennale. In seven scenes, the work deals with life and death of the philosopher Walter Benjamin. It was written from 1999 to 2004 and was premiered on 25 May 2004 at the Prinzregententheater in Munich.

== History ==
Brian Ferneyhough was commissioned in 1999 to compose an opera for the Munich Biennale. He wrote Shadowtime to an English libretto by Charles Bernstein that deals with life and death of the German philosopher Walter Benjamin.:

The opera was premiered on 25 May 2004 at the Prinzregententheater in Munich in the final performance of the Biennale, after individual scenes had already been performed in concert version. It was played in the UK at the English National Opera and recorded there by BBC, aired in 2005.

== Composition ==
Instead of telling a story among characters, the opera is a sequence of seven scenes, in a form similar to early intermedi; they have been described as dreamlike:

1. New Angels/Transient Failure
2. Les Froissements d'ailes de Gabriel
3. Doctrine of Similarity
4. Opus contra naturam: A Shadow Play for Speaking Pianist
5. Pools of Darkness
6. Seven Tableaux Vivants Representing the Angel of History as Melancholia
7. Stelae for Failed Time

The first scene is about Benjamin's suicide. The libretto includes elements from his philosophy "on time, history and representation", from the point of view of his descent into the underworld.

The composer regards Opus contra naturam, a scene set to the composer's own text and played by a Liberace-like figure, as the centre-piece of the opera. In the premiere, Nicolas Hodges performed speaking and playing while his grand piano was moved across the stage.
