= Michael Talbot (musicologist) =

British musicologist and composer

Michael Owen Talbot, FBA (born 4 January 1943 in Luton) is a British musicologist and composer.

Talbot is a former Professor of Music at the University of Liverpool. An expert in Italian baroque music, Talbot has authored monographs on Antonio Vivaldi and Tommaso Albinoni, and is an editor of the scholarly journal "Studi Vivaldiani". He is also active as a historicist composer, and a member of the "Vox Saeculorum" society.

Talbot's expertise has been called upon in instances where the authenticity and/or provenance of works has been questioned, including the discovery of the possible Vivaldi work Andromeda Liberata.

== Works ==
- Antonio Vivaldi: The Manchester Violin Sonatas (A-R Editions 1976) ISBN 0-89579-072-6
- Vivaldi's 'Manchester' Sonatas (Cambridge University Press 1977)
- Vivaldi (London 1978, revised 1984, 1993); German: Antonio Vivaldi: Der Venezianer und das barocke Europa. Leben und Werk (Stuttgart 1985, Frankfurt am Main 1998)
- Vivaldi (London 1979)
- Albinoni. Leben und Werk (Adliswil/CH 1980)
- Antonio Vivaldi: A Guide to Research (New York 1988)
- Tomaso Albinoni: The Venetian Composer and His World (Oxford 1990, revised 1994)
- Benedetto Vinaccesi: A Musician in Brescia and Venice in the Age of Corelli (Oxford 1994)
- The Sacred Vocal Music of Antonio Vivaldi (Florence 1995)
- Venetian Music in the Age of Vivaldi (Aldershot 1999)
- The Musical Work: Reality or Invention? (Liverpool University Press 2000)
- The Finale in Western Instrumental Music (Oxford 2001)
- The Chamber Cantatas of Antonio Vivaldi (Woodbridge 2006)
- Vivaldi and Fugue (Florence 2009)
- The Vivaldi Compendium (Woodbridge 2011)
