= Études transcendantales =

Set of études by Brian Ferneyhough

Études transcendantales is a song cycle in nine movements for mezzo-soprano and chamber ensemble composed by Brian Ferneyhough between 1982 and 1985.

== Background ==
The creative basis for the Études transcendantales was Ferneyhough's mild mid-life crisis. He thought about death and what makes music more than just music of the moment, and thus the songs deal with such themes. As part of this, he wanted the ensemble to sound rather harsh. Starting from the standard modernist Pierrot ensemble, he replaced the clarinet exchanged for an oboe, the piano for a harpsichord, and removed the violin altogether. Including the voice, now all the parts are very different from each other and have strongly contrasting timbres, e.g., the pointillistic harpsichord with the smoother mezzo-soprano.

Originally, Ferneyhough intended all the songs to be set to poems by the German poet Ernst Meister. However, he could not find enough suitable poems on death and permanence, and instead commissioned a poet friend, Alrun Moll, to write texts for the remaining songs.

== Music ==
Like many other works by Ferneyhough and other New Complexity composers, Études transcendantales is considered very difficult to perform and is extremely complicated. Pitch-wise, the notes are freely sampled from all 12 tones and the quarter tones in between. Rhythmically, it includes nested irregular tuplets. Almost each individual note also has its own unique dynamics and articulation, including extended techniques such as multiphonics on the oboe, glottal stops for the voice, and key-clicking for the flute.

Throughout the nine songs, the process of composition transitions from a serialist-type systematic approach in the first song to an intuitive and free approach by the last song. While Ferneyhough thought this system was important, the practical effects are not discernible to the listener, as his intuitive composition produces music like that produced by his automation methods.

First measure of movement 1 of Études transcendantales, oboe part

For example, for the oboe part in the first song, the rhythm is almost totally determined by a strict system, with five stages of complexity, each determined by another cycle of numbers:

1. dividing each measure into a number of notes
2. subdividing chunks of those notes into another layer
3. adding dots so that 4 notes fit where 3 did previously
4. tie some notes with each other and replace others with rests
5. replace two consecutive notes with a triplet in which one beat is a rest

Each subsequent song has its own unique system (or intuitive development) for the creation of all aspects of the composition.

Alternatively, if only to prove that the score is self-consistent, the rhythm can be deconstructed. The very first measure can be broken down in increasing complexity (note that the actual meter is in 2/10, but is really equivalent to a 2/8 measure at 5/4 the speed):
