= Single affect principle =

Musicological term

The single affect principle is a musicological term describing the idea that contrasting affects (moods or sentiments) cannot belong in the one and the same musical movement, the harmonic structure of which would thus be limited by enharmonic modulations. It was one of the defining characteristics of pre-Classical period music (Renaissance music, Baroque music, etc.), and gradually became obsolete ca. 1800. There has been a resurgence of its use in contemporary historicist and minimalist music.
