= Franklin Cox =

American musician

Franklin Cox (born Charleston, Illinois, 1961) is an American composer, scholar, and cellist.

== Life ==
Cox studied with Brian Ferneyhough at the University of California, San Diego, and at the Darmstädter Ferienkurse. He is currently (2020) associate professor of theory, composition, and cello at Wright State University. His ongoing concert series, The New Cello, features his work in addition to other composers that explore new possibilities on the instrument through extended techniques and microtonality.) Cox has also been co-editor of Search: Journal for New Music and Culture since its founding in 2007. 3

== Music ==
Franklin Cox's work advances a range of features and concepts associated with "New Complexity; his performances range widely between new music to classical and common-practice chamber works. Works with considerable recognition include Chronopolis, for solo flute (1988–89), Di-remption, for solo percussionist (1993), If on a Winter's Night ..., for solo clarinet (1988) and a landmark series of solo string compositions: the Clairvoyance set for violin solo, with a version for cello (1989), and Recoil, for cello solo (1994), along with a range of cello etudes. Cox's cycle Spiegelgeschichte, for 24 Voices, was a commission from Südwestrunfunk (SWR), Germany (2009–2011). Its first performance was by SWR Chorus in Eclat 2011 festival, Stuttgart, Germany.

== Scholarship ==
Cox has an international reputation as a scholar and as an editor of scholarship, with particular attention to the European tradition of new music and associated practices in the Americas. In that vein his foci have tended toward conceptual approaches to musical form, history, aesthetics (and its cultural/ideological implications); his is prolific reviewer of others' music and scholarship, particularly on Elliott Carter. His analyses of, and scholarship about, Klaus Hübler, with James Avery, is the definitive lens on that subject. His analyses of his own music have also achieved significant circulation and academic attention. There exists also a considerable body of scholarship on Cox's own work. His scholarship has been translated into German and Italian.

== Recordings of Cox's music ==
- "This Isle is Full of Noises" Lisa Cella, flute, Centaur Records 3091 (2010). Includes "Chronopolis", for solo Flute
- The New Cello, Vol 1 – American Composers. Centaur Records 2994 (2010), Franklin Cox, cello. Includes "Clairvoyance" and "Recoil" for solo cello
- New Music Series Volume 4. Neuma Records 450-102 (2002). Includes Shift, for five cellos, performed by Frank Cox.
- Surplus Live auf Solitude. Stuttgart: Edition Solitude, ACD 6024-3. Includes R, performed by singers from the Stuttgarter Musikhochschule, dir. James Avery.
- Pierre-Yves Artaud, flauto. Milan: Rusty Classica, RUS 555019.2. Includes Chronopolis, performed by Pierre-Yves Artaud.

== Selected cello recordings by Cox ==
- The New Cello, Vol 2 – European Composers. Centaur Records 3390 (2014). Works by Klaus K. Hübler, Mahnkopf, Redgate, Barrett, Erber, Nunes, and Finnissy.
- La vision d'ange nouveau for solo cello from Angelus Novus Cycle by Claus-Steffen Mahnkopf (NEOS 1121112, 2013).
- "The Courier's Tragedy" from "Pynchon Cycle" by Claus-Steffen Mahnkopf (Neos 269220, 2011). Cello part written for Dr. Cox
- The New Cello, Vol 1 – American Composers. Centaur Records 2994 (2010), Franklin Cox, cello. Works by Carter, Ben Johnston, and Stuart Saunders Smith
- "See Under Love" (Mode Records 169, 2006). Recording of opera by Chaya Czernowin premiered at Munich Biennale, 2000. Solo cello part written for Franklin Cox.

== Reviews of Work by Franklin Cox ==
- Covell, Grant Chu. 2018. La Folia review of Franklin Cox, The New Cello, Vol. 1: American Composers, http://www.lafolia.com/string-theory-26-some-duos-duets/
- Rutherford-Johnson, Tim. 2017. Music after the Fall: Modern Composition and Culture since 1989 (University of California Press).
- Covell, Grant Chu. 2016. La Folia 2016 review of Franklin Cox, The New Cello, Vol. 2: European Composers, https://www.lafolia.com/string-theory-19-mostly-cello/
- Orning, Tanya. 2015. "The ethics of performance practice in complex music after 1945," in Erling E. Guldbransen and Julian Johnson, Transformations of Musical Modernism, 299-318 (Cambridge University Press, 2015).
- Cook, Nicholas. 2013. 'Beyond the Score (Oxford University Press): article by Cox is central focus of Chapter 8 and cited elsewhere throughout book.
- Clarke, Colin. 2012. Review of Claus-Steffen Mahnkopf CD including Dr. Cox's recording of his The Courier's Tragedy, Tempo, Vol. 66, No. 261 (July 2012), pp. 77.
- Asmus, Bernd. 2011. Review of Franklin Cox, The New Cello, vol. 1: American Composers, Musik & Ästhetik (Winter, 2011).
- Hadjileontiadis, Leontios J. 2010. "Aesthetic Shifts from the Avant-garde towards the ‘Second Modernity’: The Swaddling of a New Compositional Thinking," Proceedings of the International Conference Beyond the Centres: Musical Avant-Gardes Since 1950, Thessaloniki, Greece, July 1–3, 2010.
- Antoniadis, Pavlos. 2010. "Learning complex piano music: Environmentalist applications," Proceedings of the International Conference Beyond the Centres: Musical Avant-Gardes Since 1950 Thessaloniki, Greece, July 1–3, 2010.
- Gann, Kyle. 2010. "The Mount Everest of String Quartets," PostClassic: Kyle Gann on Music after the Fact (Short review of 2010 American Innovators festival organized by Dr. Cox.)(http://www.artsjournal.com/postclassic/2010/03/the_mount_everest_of_string_qu.html), March 2010.
- Stefanou, Danae and Antoniadis, Pavlos. 2009. "Inter-Structures: Rethinking Continuity in Post-1945 Piano Repertoire," Journal of Interdisciplinary Music Studies, Spring/Fall 2009, Volume 3, Issue 1&2, pp. 77–93.
- Mahkopf, Claus-Steffen. 2000. "Das Generationsproblem der Neuen Musik," in Frankfurter Allgemeine Zeitung, 7 April 2001.
- Haltern, Ulrich R. 2000. "Musik (und Recht) heute." in Festschrift für Knut Ipsen (München, C. H. Beck, 2000).
