= René Wohlhauser =

Swiss composer

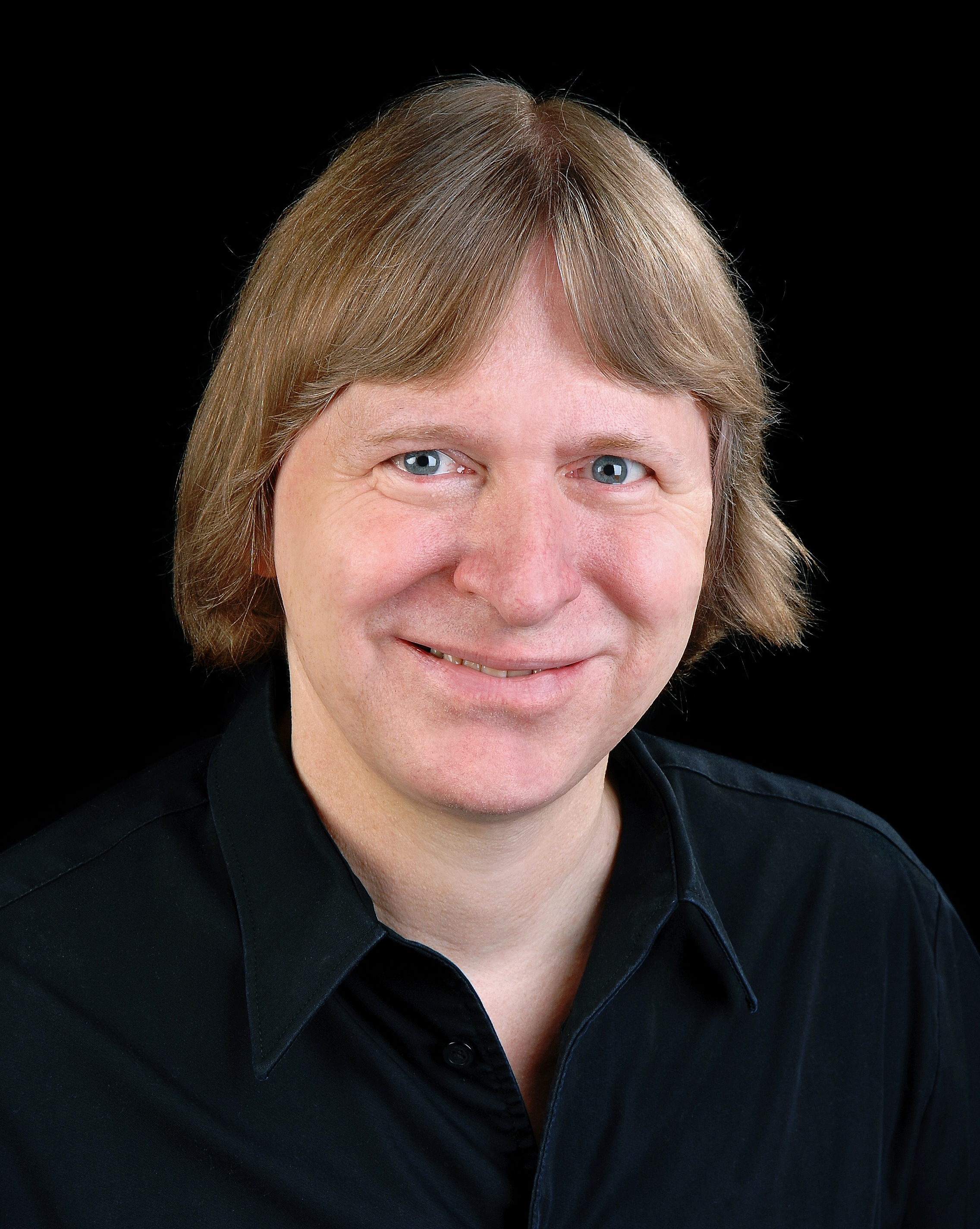
René Wohlhauser (2009)

René Wohlhauser (born 24 March 1954) is a Swiss composer, pianist, singer, improviser, conductor and music teacher.

== Life ==
Wohlhauser was born in Zurich. From 1975 to 1979 he studied counterpoint, harmony, music analysis, score reading, orchestration and composition with Thomas Kessler, Robert Suter, Jacques Wildberger and Jürg Wyttenbach at the City of Basel Music Academy, earning a diploma in music theory. He went on to study composition with Kazimierz Serocki, Mauricio Kagel, Herbert Brün and Heinz Holliger, and for several years studied with Klaus Huber and Brian Ferneyhough. The latter had a decisive influence on Wohlhauser's work. Wohlhauser currently teaches composition, improvisation and music theory at the Basel Music Academy. As a performer of contemporary music, he is heard all over Europe, recently mostly with his ensemble «Ensemble Polysono», as well as with soprano Christine Simolka. Wohlhauser has published several writings on music.

== Music ==
Wohlhauser's prolific output covers many musical genres. His compositions include solo, chamber, orchestral, organ and stage works. In his early works, Wohlhauser also made use of electro-acoustic techniques. In his works, extra-musical impulses are often the starting point for a composition. References to philosophical, linguistic and scientific themes are particularly prominent. Wohlhauser is a composer who is tirelessly looking for new compositional strategies and puts established compositional systems into question. The consistent way in which he works out his compositional concepts often results in a dense and complex musical language that challenges performers as well as audiences.

=== Compositions ===
- Lemuria for 2 flutes and tape (1977)
- Nesut for piano solo (1977)
- cemaltorz for soprano (also mezzo-soprano) and piano (1977)
- Souvenirs de l’Occitanie for clarinet solo (1978)
- Modulaltica für alto flute and synthesizer (1978). Also: Modulaltica-Variationen for alto flute solo (1978)
- Fragmente for orchestra (1979)
- flautando for 2 flutes (1980/81, rev. 1987)
- Musica Assoluta e Determinata for voice and chamber orchestra (1981)
- Largo elettrificato for voice and chamber orchestra with electronic sound modulation (1981)
- Klavierquartett for string trio (Violin, viola, cello) and piano (1979/83-84, rev. 1987)
- Schlagzeugtrio (1984/85). Additional version Sarktirko (2008) for percussion solo
- CI-IC for flute and viola (1985)
- Duometrie for flute and bass clarinet (1985/86)
- Orgelstück for organ (1986)
- Drei Stücke for piano (1986/87)
- Klarinettentrio «Metamusik» for 3 clarinets in B flat (1986/87)
- Adagio assai for string quartet (1982/83/85/87/88)
- Atemlinie for horn solo (and tam-tam, same player) (1988)
- Lumière(s) for organ (1989)
- in statu mutandi for orchestra (1991–93)
- vocis imago for flute, clarinet, percussion, piano, violin and cello (1993–95). 62 additional versions from solo to quintet.
- Gedankenflucht for cello and piano (1995)
- Quantenströmung for flute, viola and harp (harp trio) (1996)
- Quantenströmung – version for flute, cello and piano (1996–97)
- Entropía for solo cello (1997/98)
- carpe diem in beschleunigter Zeit for string quartet (1998/99)
- Die Auflösung der Zeit in Raum for saxophone, percussion and piano (2000–01). Additional version: Saró (2008) for solo saxophone
- Meditation über die Zeit für die linke Hand am Klavier for piano (2001)
- Klänge in der Zeit for piano (2000)
- Manía for piano (2001/02)
- Musik für Flöte solo for solo flute (2002)
- Gantenbein, Musiktheater für 4 Solisten und Orchester (2002–2004), text after Max Frisch
- Rachearie from the opera Gantenbein, transcription for soprano and piano (2004)
- Sulawedische Lieder, songs and vocal pieces, a cycle on onomatopoetic texts by the composer for soprano (also mezzo-soprano), baritone, 1 to 2 voices and piano (2 to 5 players) (2005/06/08)
- Drei andere Stücke for piano (2005/06)
- mira schinak, trio for soprano, flute and piano. Based on an onomatopoetic text by the composer (2006)
- mikka resna for tenor and guitar. Based on an onomatopoetic text by the composer (2006)
- Studie über Zustände und Zeitprozesse for flute and piano (2007)
- ‘Srang for soprano, flute, clarinet and cello. Based on an onomatopoetic text by the composer (2007)
- Streichtrio for string trio (2007)
- Sarktirko (2008) for solo percussion
- Saró (2008) for solo saxophone
- Ly-Gue-Tin, eine augenzwinkernd-klingende, halbszenische Werkmonographie für Stimme(n) und Klavierklänge auf eigene lautpoetische Texte for voice(s) and piano (1988)
- Sokrak for soprano, flute, clarinet, cello and piano. Based on an onomatopoetic text by the composer (2008)
- Iguur – Blay – Luup, triptych for solo soprano, duet soprano-baritone, soprano and chamber ensemble. Based on an onomatopoetic text by the composer (2009). Several additional versions.
- Masona for 16-voice mixed chorus. Based on onomatopoetic texts by the composer (2009–10)

== Awards ==
- 1978 Valentino Bucchi composition prize, Rome
- 1981 Association of German music schools, Bonn: composition prize
- 1983 Association of Zurich music schools, Switzerland: composition prize
- 1984 City and canton of Fribourg, Switzerland: composition prize
- 1987 Salzburg chapter: composition prize
- 1988 Darmstadt International Summer Courses for New Music: Kranichstein grant
- 1990 Foundation for Music and Theatre, St Gallen, Switzerland: Composition prize
- 1991 Culture award, canton of Lucerne, Switzerland
- 1992 Complimentary award, Schweizer Gesellschaft für musikpädagogische Forschung, Zurich
- 1996 «Selection» award, Swiss Radio International
- 1998 Culture award, canton of Basel-Landschaft, Switzerland

== Discography ==
- René Wohlhauser in statu mutandi (Creative Works Records CW 1026, © 1996)
- René Wohlhauser, composer's portrait (Grammont Portrait CTS-M 117, © 2009)
- Ensemble polysono plays compositions by René Wohlhauser and Ursula Seiler Kombaratov, Vol. 1 (Polysono Records 2008-1, © 2008)
- Ensemble polysono plays compositions by René Wohlhauser and Ursula Seiler Kombaratov, Vol. 2 (Polysono Records 2009-1, © 2009)

== Sources ==
This article is a translation from René Wohlhauser on the German Wikipedia, where the following sources were given:

- Hanns-Werner Heister and Walter Wolfgang Sparrer, "Komponisten der Gegenwart" Munich, Text+Kritik, no. 24, 2002.
- Ulrich Mosch, article "René Wohlhauser", in Ludwig Finscher, Die Musik in Geschichte und Gegenwart. Bärenreiter, Kassel 1994, supplement, p. 1146.
- Helga de la Motte-Haber, Geschichte der Musik im 20. Jahrhundert: 1975–2000. Laaber-Verlag, Laaber 2000, p. 337 (Handbuch der Musik im 20. Jahrhundert, 4).
- Jean-Noël von der Weid, Die Musik des 20. Jahrhunderts. Insel, Frankfurt 2001, p. 167.
- René Wohlhauser, "Über kompositorische, ästhetische und philosophische Aspekte eigener Werke", in: Komposition und Ästhetik. Schott, Mainz 1994, pp. 98–107 (Darmstädter Beiträge zur Neuen Musik, 20).
- René Wohlhauser, "in statu mutandi – a work analysis", in: Claus-Steffen Mahnkopf, Frank Cox, Wolfram Schurig, Polyphony & Complexity Wolke Verlag, Hofheim 2002, pp. 314–324 (New Music and Aesthetics in the 21st Century, vol. 1).
- René Wohlhauser, "Ein Psychodrama der Seelenspiegelungen. Über die Oper Gantenbein'', in: Dissonanz, no. 87 (9/2004), Zürich 2004.
- René Wohlhauser, "Der notwendige Anachronismus der Kunst". Essay for the composer's portrait CD Grammont-CD 2009.
- Schweizer Komponisten unserer Zeit. Amadeus, Winterthur 1993, p. 447.
- Anne-Lise Delacrétaz, Schriftstellerinnen und Schriftsteller der Gegenwart. Sauerländer, Aarau 2002, p. 433.
- Au carrefour des mondes: Komponieren in der Schweiz – ein Kompendium in Essays, Analysen, Portraits und Gesprächen. Pfau, Saarbrücken 2008, pp. 562–569.
