= The Navigator (opera) =

The Navigator is an opera by Liza Lim to a libretto by Patricia Sykes. The work had its world premiere at the Judith Wright Arts Centre as part of the Brisbane Festival 2008 on 30 July 2008. It lasts for about 100 minutes without an interval.

The work was developed during Lim's stay in 2007/2008 in Berlin; on 9 March 2008, excerpts were performed with the ELISION ensemble conducted by Simon Hewett at the MaerzMusik Festival, part of the Berliner Festspiele.

== Theme ==
The Navigator evokes stories from the great Indian epic Mahabharata and the romance of Tristan und Isolde, in its telling of how people risk everything in journeying towards unity and/or transformation, questioning the contingency of living only one life in one world.

— from the program notes:

== Roles ==
Roles, voice types, premiere cast and creatives
Role	Voice type	Premiere cast, 30 July 2008 Conductor: Manuel Nawri
The Beloved	soprano	Talise Trevigne
The Navigator	countertenor	Andrew Watts
The Fool	baritone	Omar Ebrahim
Angel of History	soprano	Deborah Kayser
The Crone	bass-baritone	Philip Larson
Recorder soloist		Genevieve Lacey
Orchestra		ELISION Ensemble
Director		Barrie Kosky
Set design		Barrie Kosky and Alice Babidge
Costume design		Alice Babidge
Lighting design		Damien Cooper
Sound design		Michael Hewes
