= Nigel Osborne =

British composer, teacher and aid worker

Nigel Osborne MBE
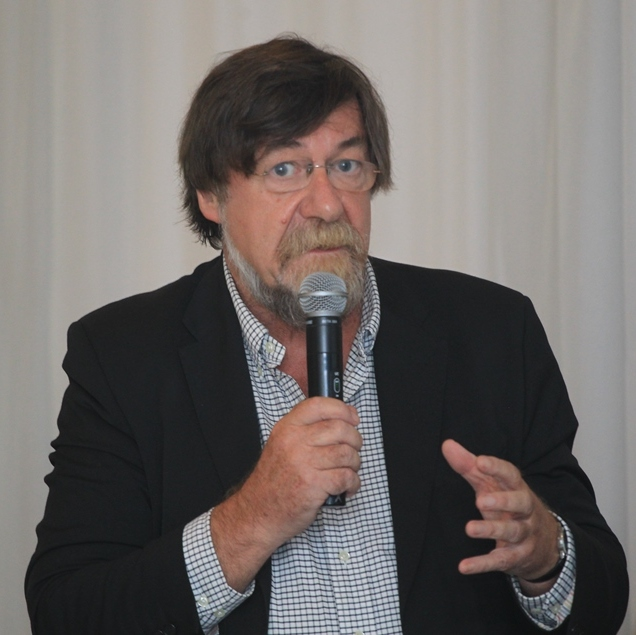
- Osborne at Rhodes Forum 2014
- Born: 23 June 1948 (age 78); Manchester, England
- Occupation: Composer

Nigel Osborne MBE (born 23 June 1948) is a British composer, teacher and aid worker. He served as Reid Professor of Music at the University of Edinburgh and has also taught at the Hochschule für Musik, Theater und Medien Hannover. Known for his extensive charity work supporting war traumatised children using music therapy techniques, especially in the Balkans during the Bosnian War, and in the Syrian conflict. He speaks eight languages.

Osborne was born in Manchester, England, to a Scottish family. He studied composition with Kenneth Leighton, Egon Wellesz, and Witold Rudziński. His compositions include the opera The Electrification of the Soviet Union, Concerto for Flute and Chamber Orchestra commissioned by the City of London Sinfonia, I am Goya, Remembering Esenin, and Birth of the Beatles Symphony.

Osborne retired from his Edinburgh University position in 2012, and is now working internationally as freelance composer, arranger and aid worker. Currently working with war-traumatised children from the Russian invasion of Ukraine.

== Career ==
Osborne studied composition with Egon Wellesz, first pupil of Arnold Schoenberg (1968–69), also with Kenneth Leighton (his predecessor as Reid Professor of Music at the University of Edinburgh) at Oxford University (1969–70), and later in Warsaw with Witold Rudziński (1970–71) where he also he worked in the Polish Radio Experimental Studio. From 1983 until 1985, while at the IRCAM in Paris, Osborne co-founded Contemporary Music Review with Tod Machover. He held a special professorship at the University of Nottingham from 1978 to 1987, the Reid Chair and Dean of the Faculty of Music at Edinburgh University from 1989 to 2012, a senior professorship (C4) at the University of Hannover from 1996 to 1998 and head of faculty for the Vienna–Prague–Budapest Summer Academy (ISA) from 2007 to 2014. Currently professor emeritus at Edinburgh University, visiting professor in the drama faculty of Rijeka University and consultant to the Chinese Music Institute, Peking University. He has worked as visiting lecturer and examiner also at Harvard, UCLA, CalArts, Gedai and Toho Gakuen School of Music, Oxford, the Sorbonne and Bologna.

Osborne's works have been performed internationally by Vienna Symphony, Moscow Symphony Orchestra, Leningrad Philharmonic, the Philharmonia of London, Los Angeles Philharmonic, Berlin Symphony, Glyndebourne, Opera Circus, Opera Factory, Scottish Opera and the Royal Opera House. He has received, among numerous awards, a Netherlands Gaudeamus prize, the Opera Prize of the Radio Sussie Romande and Ville de Geneve, and the Koussevitzky Award of the Library of Congress Washington.

In the 1980s, Osborne composed a series of classic works for choreographer Richard Alston and Ballet Rambert. Master of Music at the Shakespeare's Globe (1999–2000), and since 2000 has been house composer for Ulysses Theatre, Istria. Osborne has collaborated with directors Lenka Udovicki, Peter Sellars, David Pountney, Michael McCarthy and David Freeman, and with writers Samuel Beckett, Craig Raine, Eve Ensler, Jo Shapcott, Howard Barker, Ariel Dorfman, Tena Štivičić and Goran Simić, with notable actors Vanessa Redgrave, Annette Bening, Lynn Redgrave, Amanda Plummer, Rade Šerbedžija, Simon Callow, Ian McDiarmid and Janet Henfrey, also with artists and designers John Hoyland, Dick Smith, George Tsypin, David Roger, Bjanka Adzic Ursulov and Peter Mumford. Singers and soloists with whom Osborne has collaborated include pioneers of contemporary music, such as Jane Manning, Linda Hirst, Liz Lawrence and Omar Ebrahim, alongside long-standing collaborations with artists Florian Kitt, Ernst Kovacic and the Hebrides Ensemble. Osborne's film documentary credits include BAFTA-winning and -nominated collaborations with director Samir Mehanović, an EMMY-winning collaboration with the BBC, and the film Dans un océan d'images with Helen Doyle and InformAction, Montreal. He has a special interest in Arabic, Indian and Chinese music.

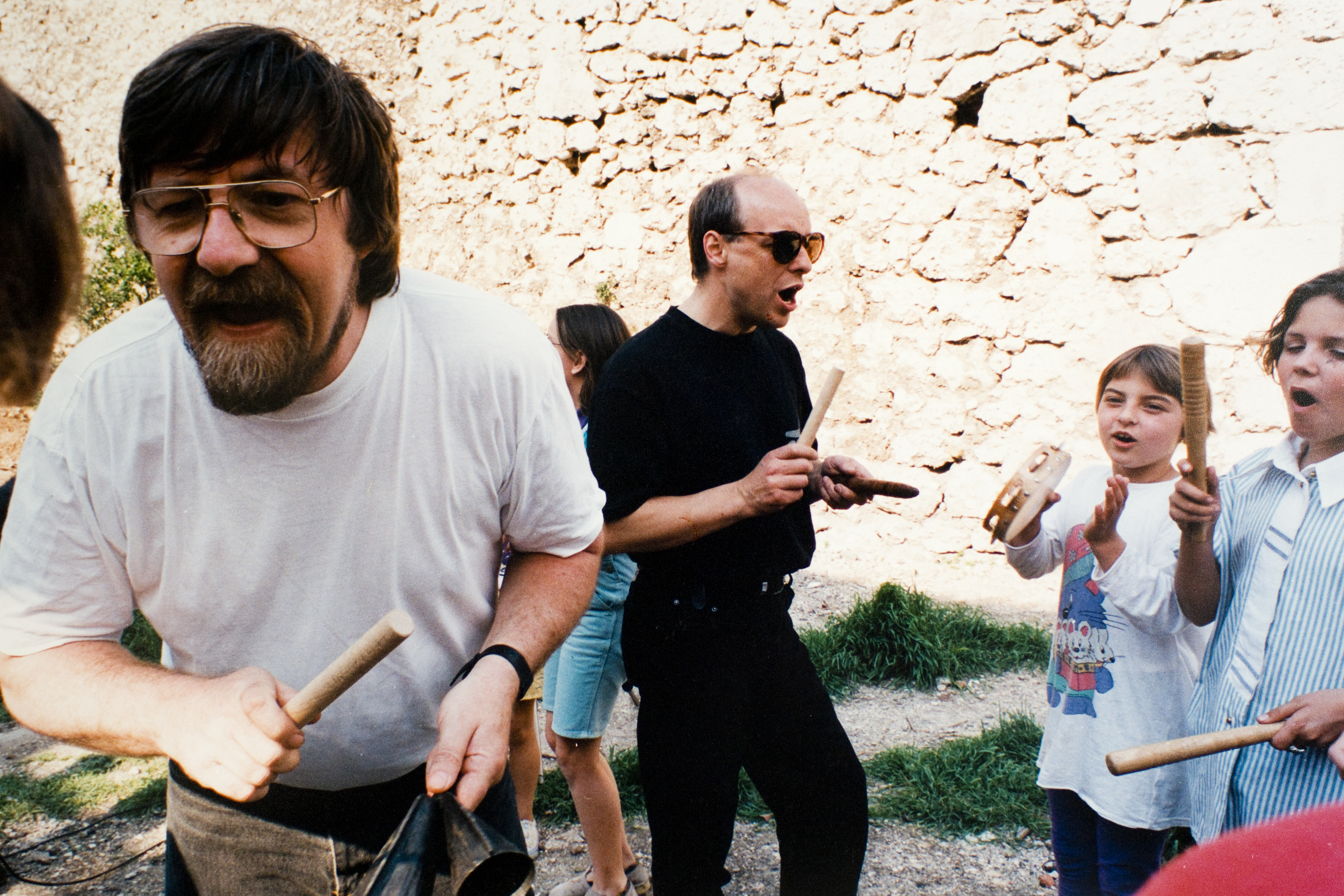
Osborne and Brian Eno leading music workshops, Pavarotti Centre, Bosnia 1995.

Osborne has pioneered methods of using music and the creative arts to support children who are victims of conflict. This approach was developed during the war in Bosnia-Herzegovina (1992–95), and since then this work has been implemented widely in the Balkan region, the Caucasus, the Middle East, East Africa, South East Asia and India. He was also awarded the Freedom Prize of the Peace Institute, Sarajevo, for his work for Bosnian children during the siege of the city. Osborne has worked actively in human rights initiatives, Workers' Defence Committee in Poland (1970–89), Citizens' Forum and the Jazz Section with Václav Havel in former Czechoslovakia (1987–1989), for Syrian refugee support organisations. During the genocide Osborne worked directly for the Government of Bosnia-Herzegovina. From 2012 until 2014, Osborne served as co-chair of the Global Agenda Committee for Arts in Society for the World Economic Forum.

In 2004 Osborne began an artistic relationship with 'Opera Circus', a chamber opera and music theatre company based in West Dorset UK during which the Bosnian sevdah opera Differences in Demolitions was produced, with Bosnian poet Goran Simić and Scottish conductor William Conway. Opera Circus toured through BiH in 2017.

Osborne has been active in supporting the development of new music technologies, for example the Skoog, and is co-inventor with Paul Robertson of X-System, an 'informatic modelling of the musical brain'. In December 2017 he received the British Academy of Songwriters, Composers, and Authors' (BASCA) Award for Inspiration. Osborne was awarded both the Queen's Prize and Music Industry Prize for innovation in education, and was recently made honorary fellow of the Educational Institute of Scotland. He is a director of the Scottish educational development company, Tapestry Partnership.

In 2017, Osborne was commissioned by the Royal Liverpool Philharmonic Orchestra to arrange Sgt. Pepper's Lonely Hearts Club Band for the ‘It Was Fifty Years Ago Today’ concerts with the Bootleg Beatles performed to capacity crowds at the Royal Albert Hall and Echo Arena Liverpool.

== Publications ==
=== Scientific and scholarly publications ===
- Osborne, Nigel. (23 February 2017). Handbook of Musical Identities - "The Identities of Sevda: from Graeco-Arabic medicine to music therapy". Editors: MacDonald, Hargreaves and Miell. ISBN 9780199679485. Oxford University Press. (Oxford, UK and New York).
- Osborne, Nigel. (21 February 2017) Love, Rhythm and Chronobiology in Rhythms of Relating in Children's Therapies – 'Connecting Creatively with Vulnerable Children'. Editors: Daniel and Trevarthen. ISBN 9781784502843. Jessica Kingsley Publishers. (London, UK and Philadelphia, USA).
- Osborne, Nigel. (2014). "The Plenum Brain in Unbribable Bosnia and Herzegovina". p. 174. Editor: D. Arsenijević South East European integration perspectives. ISBN print: ISBN 978-3-8487-1634-0, ISBN online: ISBN 978-3-8452-5674-0. Nomos Verlag. (Baden-Baden, Germany).
- Trevarthen, Colwyn; Gratier, Maya; Osborne, Nigel (2014). "The human nature of culture and education". Cognitive Science. 5 (2). Hoboken, New Jersey: 173–192. doi:10.1002/wcs.1276. ISSN 1939-5078. PMID 26304307.
- Osborne, Nigel. (July 2013). "Resilience and recovery – violence, disasters and the arts, presentation, Global Alliance for Arts and Health". APPG on Agriculture and Food for Development. Library of Congress. (Washington DC, USA).
- Osborne, Nigel. (23 April 2012). "Neuroscience and real world practice: music as a therapeutic resource for children in zones of conflict". New York Academy of Sciences. Neurosciences and Music. (New York, USA).
- Osborne, Nigel. 2009. "Music for children in zones of conflict and postconflict: a psychobiological approach". In Communicative Musicality. Editors: S. Malloch and C. Trevarthen. ISSN 0077-8923. Oxford University Press and New York Academy of Sciences. (Oxford, UK and New York, USA).
- Klempe, Hroar (2009). "How to Understand Communicative Musicality?". Integrative Psychological and Behavioral Science. 43 (3): 260–266. doi:10.1007/s12124-009-9096-9. ISSN 1932-4502. S2CID 144409675.

=== Selected publications ===
==== University of York Music Press ====
- 2013

The Painters in my Garden for three flutes
A Prayer and Two Blessings for SATB choir

- 2011

Botanical Studies for oboe and percussion

- 2010

Concertino for Violin and Orchestra for solo violin and orchestra
Differences in Demolition (A sevdah opera)
I am not here for voice and piano (only available in Songs for the Twenty-First Century)
Journey to the End of the Night for oboe, percussion and electronics
SMTBarBar for soli, clarinet, percussion, violin, viola, cello, accordion and machine sounds Stargazing string quartet

- 2009

The Birth of Naciketas guitar concertante for guitar, Indian violin, tabla, string quartet, double bass and percussion

- 2009

Afro-Scottish for children's choir, SATB choir and jazz orchestra
Angel-Nebulae for TTTB soli
East for symphony orchestra
La Belle Hélène for three flutes (doubling alto flute and piccolo) and cello
Naturtöne / Abschied SATTBarB choir
Queens of Govan for chamber opera for mezzo soprano, recorded voices and 15 instruments
Rock Music for 12 instruments and electronic materials
7 Words, 7 Icons, 7 Cities for SATB choir (with divisi) and string orchestra
Stone Garden for 2 cellos and accordion
Tiree string quartet
Transformations for 2 solo oboe d'amore 2009 Dialogue oboe and harp

- 2008

Concerto for Viola and Orchestra
Roma Diary for cello and piano

- 2007

Balkan Dances and Laments for oboe, piano, violin, viola and cello
Sarajevo for clarinet, piano and cello
Transformations for 1 two violas 2007 Taw-Raw solo violin

- 2006

The Piano Tuner for piano trio
Pulsus for CtTTBar soli and monochord

- 2004

String Quartet No. 1 Medicinal Songs and Dances

- 1999

Concerto for Oboe and Chamber Orchestra

==== Universal Edition ====
- Various

Adagio für Vedran Smailović für Violoncello
After Night | 1977: für Gitarre | 8
Figure/Ground für Klavier solo
For a Moment für Frauenchor, Violoncello und Kandyan Drum (ad lib.) | 15
Remembering esenin für Violoncello und Klavier

- 2013

Espionage | 2013: 3 miniature sonatas, studies in Poussin and happenstance | für Violine solo | 8

- 1993

The Art of Fugue | 1993: für Violoncello und Instrumente | 20 2 2 2 2 – 2 2 0 0 – Schl – Str
Hommage à Panufnik | 1993: für Streichorchester | 8

- 1992
- Terrible Mouth | 1992 Musiktheater | 120
- 1991

Albanian Nights | 1991: für Ensemble | 12 2 2 2 2 – 2 0 0 0
Graffiti after Cy Twombly | 1991: on the musical letters of Alfred Schlee | für Streichquartett
Schleedoyer II | 1991: für Streichquartett | 1 30
The Sun of Venice | 1991: für Orchester | 25 – 30' 3 3 3 3 – 3 3 2 1 – Schl(3) – 2 Hf, Cel, Klav – Str – 2 konzertante Gruppen

- 1990

Canzona – Procession of Boats with Distant, Smoke, Venice | 1990: für Horn, 4 Trompeten, 4 Posaunen und Tuba | 12
Eulogy | 1990: für Kammerensemble | 8 1 1 1 1 – 1 1 1 0 – Schl, Klav, StrQuint
Tracks | 1990: für 2 gemischte Chöre, Orchester und Blasorchester | 30 4 4 5 5 – 6 4 4 1 – Pk, Schl(4), Hf, Klav, Str; 3 4 6 5 – 6 4 6 1 – Schl(6), 6 Kor, 4 Euph
Violin Concerto | 1990: für Violine und Orchester | 22 2 2 2 2 – 3 2 2 0 – Schl(3) – Hf, Klav – Str

- 1988

Esquisse 2 | 1988: für 11 Solostreicher | 10 Vl(6), Va(2), Vc(2), Kb(1)
Stone Garden | 1988: für Kammerensemble | 15 Fl, Ob, Kl, Fg, Hr, Trp, Pos – Schl – Hf – StreichQuint

- 1987

The Electrification of the Soviet Union | 1987: Oper in 2 Akten | 120
Esquisse 1 | 1987: für 11 Solostreicher | 7 Vl(6), Va(2), Vc(2), Kb(1)

- 1985

Hell's Angels | 1985: Kammeroper in 2 Akten | 120 Kaufausgabe
Pornography | 1985 für Mezzosopran und Kammerensemble | 13
Zansa | 1985: für Kammerensemble | 20 1 1 1 1 – 1 1 1 0 – Schl, Klav, "Zansa" – 2 Vl, Va, Vc, Kb

- 1984

Alba | 1984: für Mezzosopran, Kammerorchester und Tonband | 17 1 1 1 0 – 1 1 1 0 – Schl – Hf – 2 Vl, Va, Vc, Kb
Wildlife | 1984: für Kammerensemble | 20 Fl, Kl – Hr, Trp – Schl – Hf – Vl, Va, Vc, elektrischer Kb – Elektronik

- 1983

Fantasia | 1983: für Kammerensemble | 12 1 1 1 1 – 1 0 0 0 – Klav, Vl(1), Va(1), Vc(1), Kb(1)
2. Sinfonia | 1983: für Orchester | 19 4 4 4 5 – 4 4 4 1 – Schl, Vib, Hf, Cel, Klav, T-T, Str Kaufausgabe

- 1982

Cantata piccola | 1982 für Sopran und Streichquartett | 10
1. Sinfonia | 1982: für Orchester | 23 4 3 4 3 – 6 4 4 1 – Schl(2) – Hf – Str(16 12 10 8 6)

- 1981

The Cage | 1981: für Tenor und Kammerensemble | 14 Afl(G), Ob, Kl, Fg, Hr, Trp – Vl, Vl, Vc
Choralis 1-2-3 | 1981-1982: für Sopran, 2 Mezzosoprane, Tenor, Bariton und Bass
Piano Sonata | 1981: für Klavier | 25

- 1980

Concerto | 1980: für Flöte und Kammerorchester | 16 Ob(2), Hr(2), Str: Vl.I(6), Vl.II(4), Va(3), Vc(2), Kb(1)
Mythologies | 1980: für Kammerensemble | 15 Kaufausgabe
Poem without a Hero | 1980: für Sopran, Mezzosopran, Tenor, Bass und Live-Elektronik | 20

- 1979

In Camera | 1979: für Kammerensemble | 19
Madeleine de la Ste. Baume | 1979: für Sopran und Kontrabass
Songs From a Bare Mountain | 1979: für Frauenchor | 6
Under the Eyes | 1979: für Stimme, Schlagzeug, Klavier, Oboe (auch EH) und Flöte (auch Altfl.) | 9

- 1977

Cello Concerto | 1977: für Violoncello und Orchester | 17
I am Goya | 1977: für Bassbariton, Flöte, Oboe, Violine und Violoncello | 12
Orlando Furioso | 1977: für gemischten Chor und Bläserensemble | 35
Vienna – Zurich – Constance | 1977: für Sopran, Violine, Violoncello, 2 Klarinetten und Schlagzeug | 10

- 1976

Passers By | 1976: für Bassblockflöte, Stimme, Violoncello, Elektronik und Bilder

- 1975

Chansonnier | 1975: für gemischten Chor und Kammerensemble | 16
Prelude and Fugue | 1975: für Kammerensemble | 17
The Sickle | 1975: für Sopran und Orchester | 11 2 2 2 2 – 2 2 0 0 – Schl – Hf, Git – Str(6 6 4 4 2)

- 1974

Kinderkreuzzug | 1974: für Kinderchor (Vokalisen) und Instrumentalensemble | 22

- 1971

7 Words | 1971: Kantate | für 2 Tenöre, Bass, gemischten Chor und Orchester | 24 4 3 4 2 – 3 3 3 0 – Schl, Ondes Martenot, Hf, Sax(3), Str(4 4 4 4 2)

=== Reviews ===
Reviews by Nigel Osborne:

- Osborne, Nigel (1989). "Reviewed work: Stockhausen on Music, Robin Maconie; Stockhausen: Eine Biographie, Michael Kurtz; Stockhausen: Samstag aus Licht; Stockhausen: Klavierstücke XII, XIII, XIV, Bernhard Wambach". Tempo (171): 37–39. JSTOR 945245.
- — (1983). "Reviewed work: East-West Encounters – McPhee: Balinese Ceremonial Music; Young: Trajet/Inter/Lignes; Messiaen: Cantéyodjayâ; Crumb: Vox Balaenae. Dreamtiger". Tempo (146): 45–47. JSTOR 944975.
- — (1983). "Reviewed work: Douglas Young: The Hunting of the Snark, Peter Easton, Leicestershire Chorale, Leicestershire Schools Symphony Orchestra, Peter Fletcher". Tempo (145): 38–39. JSTOR 945042.
- — (1983). "Reviewed work: Michael Nyman. Bird Anthem; in Re Don Giovanni; Initial Treat/Secondary Treat; Waltz; Bird List Song: M-Work, Michael Nyman Band". Tempo (144): 40–41. JSTOR 945899.
- — (1983). "Reviewed work: Louis Andriessen: De Tijd (Time), Ensemble of the Royal Conservatory of the Hague, Reinbert de Leeuw; Diderik Wagenaar: Tam Tam. Cornelis de Bondt: Bint, Louis Andriessen". Tempo (144): 38–40. JSTOR 945898.
- — (1979). "Recent Polish Music". Music & Letters. 60 (1): 117–120. doi:10.1093/ml/60.1.117-b. JSTOR 733569.

== Filmography ==
- 2018

Through Our Eyes – composer
A Story of Three Islands – composer
I am Swimming – composer

- 2015

The Fog of Srebrenica – composer

- 2014

Frameworks: Images of a Changing World (Dans un océan d'images) – composer

- 2006

The Way We Played – composer

- 2003

Les messagers – composer

- 1990

View from the Bridge – composer

- 1988

The Electrification of the Soviet Union – composer

- 1987

Wildlife – composer

- 1984

The Sea of Faith (6-part documentary series) – composer

== Education ==
BA, BMus(Oxon), DLitt, FRCM, FEIS, FRSE

== Awards ==
- British Academy of Songwriters, Composers, and Authors Award (BASCA) (2017)
- BH Radio 1 Prize (2016)
- Honorary Fellow of the Educational Institute of Scotland (2015)
- DLitt Queen Margaret University (2013)
- Fellow of the Royal Society of Edinburgh (2011)
- Freedom Prize of the Peace Institute Sarajevo (2007)
- MBE (2003)
- Queen's Anniversary Prize (1996)
- Fellow of the Royal College of Music (1996)
- Thorn EMI Prize for Music Education (1993)
- Koussevitzky Award of the Library of Congress Washington (1985)
- Radcliffe Award (1977)
- Netherlands Gaudeamus Prize (1973)
- International Opera Prize of Radio Suisse Romande and Ville de Geneve (1971)
- Osgood Award University of Oxford (1970)

== Sources ==
- Scottish Arts Council profile article
- The Guardian – "The riddle of the rocks" – on his 2008 trip to Uganda
- The Independent – Right of Reply: "The composer Nigel Osborne defends his opera trilogy, Sarajevo"
