= Musical historicism =

Use of historical content in classical music

Musical historicism signifies the use in classical music of historical materials, structures, styles, techniques, media, conceptual content, etc., whether by a single composer or those associated with a particular school, movement, or period.

Musical historicism also denotes a theory, doctrine, or aesthetic that emphasizes the importance of music history or in which history is seen as a standard of value or determining factor (as in performance practice).

== Definition ==
The term "historicism" has acquired various, sometimes confusing meanings over a wide range of disciplines. The British philosopher Karl Popper, who disliked modern music and strongly preferred the works of Bach, Mozart, and Schubert, spoke of "the failure of the historicist propaganda for the modern in music." He opposed the socioscientific doctrine of historicism that discoverable laws of historical change make it possible to predict future developments. Repudiating the claim that Schoenberg was "an inevitable historical force", Popper dismissed the idea of wishing to do work "ahead of its time" as "nothing but historicist propaganda".

When referring to the arts, however, the term "historicism" generally denotes something distinctly different from the historicism targeted by Popper's critique. It designates "a style (as in architecture) characterized by the use of traditional forms and elements", or a style or movement characterized by "regard for or preoccupation with the styles or values of the past", frequently used pejoratively. Modernism is, on the other hand, "a self-conscious break with the past and a search for new forms of expression". The two concepts come together in what is called "historicist modernism", represented compositionally by Max Reger and Ferruccio Busoni. It is neither nostalgic nor conservative, but rather attempts to bridge perceived historical gaps without denying, collapsing, or attempting to retreat over them to return to the past. In historicist modernism, "musical techniques from the remote past are used prominently and vigorously as a way of achieving a distance from late Romantic styles".

Whereas the historicism of the Ancient Airs and Dances for Lute (1917–31) by Ottorino Respighi is readily apparent to the ear, since the composer drew directly on the works of 16th- and 17th-century composers, the historicism informing the Music of Changes (1951) by John Cage, based on the ancient Chinese I Ching, is deeply embedded in the compositional process.

== History ==
=== 17th century ===
By the second decade of the 17th century, the idea of cultivating the stile antico (as exemplified by the music of Palestrina) had become a conscious effort at historicism on the part of composers of the seconda pratica, or stile moderno. Francesco Soriano revived Palestrina's Missa Papae Marcelli (with "improvements") in 1609, and the next year Claudio Monteverdi, until then a staunch adherent of the stile moderno, composed his Missa in illo tempore, a parody mass based on a motet first published in 1538 by Nicolas Gombert. Monteverdi published his mass together with his Vespro della Beata Vergine, a sharply contrasting work of the seconda pratica.

=== 18th, 19th, and 20th centuries ===
Johann Sebastian Bach and his contemporaries incorporated traditional chorale melodies into numerous of their major works in such genres as the cantata, chorale prelude, chorale fantasia, chorale fugue, chorale motet, chorale variations, oratorio, and Passion music. Like composers before them, Johannes Brahms and Max Reger composed variations on themes taken from earlier composers (e.g., Brahms's Variations and Fugue on a Theme by Handel, Op. 24, and Variations on a Theme by Haydn, Op. 56a; and Reger's Variations and Fugue on a Theme by Bach, Op. 81, and Variations and Fugue on a Theme by Mozart, Op. 132). Stravinsky derived much of the musical material for his Pulcinella from the work of various 18th-century composers.

Creating new music that closely follows the style of an earlier composer or period has provided a creative outlet for both major and minor masters. Mozart, whose music was richly informed by his contact with the antiquarian music circle of Baron Gottfried van Swieten, exhibited a particular gift for the baroque style in such works as his Suite in C major (sometimes subtitled "in the style of Handel"), K. 399 (385i), which includes an overture, allemande, and courante. (A fragmentary sarabande and Kleine Gigue in G, K. 574, also document his skill as an historicist composer.) In a letter to his father of 7 February 1778, he proudly states, "As you know, I can more or less adopt or imitate any kind and any style of composition."

A more eclectic approach to historicism in which multiple historical style influences are evident was adopted by Louis Spohr in his Symphony No. 6 in G major, Op. 116 ("Historical") "in the Style and Taste of Four Different Periods": 1. Bach-Handel'sche Periode, 1720, Largo – Grave; 2. Haydn-Mozart'sche Periode, 1780, Larghetto; 3. Beethoven'sche Periode, 1810, Scherzo; and 4. Allerneueste Periode ["very latest Period"], 1840, Allegro vivace. Though not characteristic of his later style, Sergei Prokofiev paid tribute not only to the "classicism" of Haydn but also to the baroque gavotte in his Symphony No. 1 in D major, Op. 25 ("Classical").

The Cecilian Movement, beginning formally with the founding of the Allgemeiner Deutscher Cäcilienverein in 1868 but conceptually reaching back to the Council of Trent (1545–63), had as its goal the restoration of traditional religious feeling and the authority of the Catholic Church. Emerging from the early stages of industrialization and the Romanticism of the late-18th and early 19th centuries, the Cecilian Movement grew out of a longing for simplicity and unworldliness, but also on an historicizing desire to return compositionally to models from the past, in particular the Renaissance masters of the 15th and 16th centuries. Palestrina was taken as the chief representative of this contrapuntal music of the stile antico, sung with little or no instrumental accompaniment, which was regarded as more suitable to church music than the more emotional style that had emerged during the 18th century.

The fusion of historical and emergent styles, forms, techniques, and content in a given work is encountered with great frequency in the music of most periods. The fugue, for example, whose origins can be traced to the imitative counterpoint of the late Middle Ages and which reached full maturity in the works of Johann Sebastian Bach, figures prominently in the musical styles of a number of important composers in the 19th century and beyond, including Beethoven, Mendelssohn (whose early works were modelled on symphonies of C. P. E. Bach), Reger (whose works for solo cello, viola or violin closely imitate Bachian forms), Shostakovich, and Hindemith.

A closely related instrumental genre that first appeared in the late Renaissance, the toccata achieved particular prominence in the keyboard works of Buxtehude and J. S. Bach and has since been revived by such composers as Schumann, Debussy, and Prokofiev.

Other romantic and early 20th-century composers among the many who demonstrated either explicit or implicit historicist affinities are Barber, Bartók, Britten, Bruckner, Marius Casadesus, Chávez, Ferdinand David, Falla, Fauré, François-Joseph Fétis, Grieg, d'Indy, Ives, Kreisler, Liszt, Martinů, Paderewski, Pfitzner, Manuel Ponce, Poulenc, Respighi, Satie, Schoenberg, Sibelius, Richard Strauss, Stravinsky, Vaughan Williams, Villa-Lobos, and Wagner.

In the 20th century Carl Orff attempted a revival of ancient Greek practices of musical theater (he also regularly contributed his own texts in Latin and Ancient Greek to his own musical works).

=== Contemporary music ===
In contemporary art music, the entire gamut of historical style periods has served as a creative resource.

Interest in musical historicism has been spurred by the emergence of such international organizations as the Delian Society, dedicated to the revitalization of tonal art music, and Vox Saeculorum, whose composer members have a specialized interest in baroque idioms.

Some contemporary historicist composers, similar to the 18th-century literary figures Thomas Chatterton, James MacPherson (the Ossian poems), and Horace Walpole (The Castle of Otranto), have written under a pseudepigraphic ascription, attributing their work to other composers, either real or imaginary. These include Winfried Michel, author of the "Haydn Forgeries";) and Roman Turovsky-Savchuk, whose original lute and viola da gamba compositions in the baroque style were sufficiently convincing to be mistaken for works by composers of the 17th or 18th century, and led to accusations of "trivializing musicology". Other historicist neobaroque composers include Elam Rotem, Federico Maria Sardelli, Joseph Dillon Ford, and Grant Colburn.

== See also ==
- Single affect principle
