= Ulrich Mosch =

German musicologist

Ulrich Mosch (born 1955) is a German musicologist.

== Career ==
Born in Stuttgart, Mosch first studied school music at the Hochschule für Musik, Theater und Medien Hannover as well as German Studies and musicology at the University of Hannover and at Technische Universität Berlin with Carl Dahlhaus and Helga de la Motte-Haber. He received his doctorate with a thesis on the musical listening of serial music.

From 1986 to 1988 he was assistant to the scientific director of the Funkkolleg "Musikgeschichte". 1989 to 1990 he worked as an assistant at the State Institute for Music Research in Berlin.

Together with Gianmario Borio, Mosch taught music aesthetics at the Darmstädter Ferienkurse for new music in 1990, 1992 and 1994.

From 1990 to 2014 Mosch was research assistant of the Paul-Sacher-Stiftung in Basel. There he was responsible for more than twenty-four estates and collections of music manuscripts and other documents of composers, including the collections of Igor Stravinsky, Luciano Berio, Hans Werner Henze, Helmut Lachenmann and Wolfgang Rihm as well as the collection of documentary films by Barrie Gavin. Mosch is a member of the advisory board of the magazine Positionen (Positionen. Texte zur aktuellen Musik).

In 2004 he habilitated at the University of Salzburg. In the winter semester 2014/15 he followed a call to the Université de Genève, where he heads the Department of Musicology. Since 2017 he has been a member of the board of trustees of the Ernst von Siemens Music Foundation.

== Publications ==
Mosch is, among other things, the editor of the writings of Wolfgang Rihm and wrote numerous texts on music, music history and music aesthetics, mainly of the 20th and 21st centuries.
