= Cantéyodjayâ =

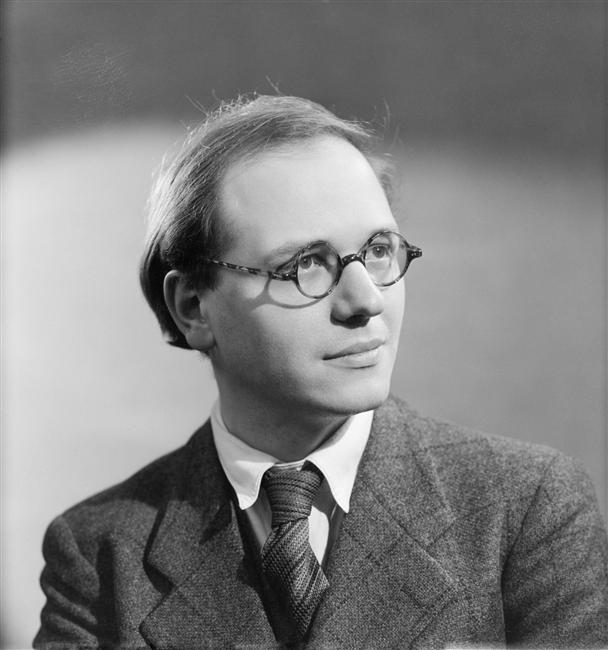
Olivier Messiaen in 1937

Cantéyodjayâ is a work for piano by the French composer Olivier Messiaen, written in 1949. The form of the work's single movement exhibits aspects of sonata-form and rondo, but progresses by superimposition and repetition rather than conventional development.

The work's compositional bases are the Hindu rhythms often found in Messiaen's work. The composer's research into Hindu rhythms was based partly on the 120 rhythms listed in the thirteenth-century Sangita Ratnakara of Śārṅgadeva. The score includes names that are taken from this work, and also from Carnatic musical theory.

The opening element of the work is named "Cantéyodjayâ" (a Carnatic name) in the score. This opening figuration recurs often, interspersed with other material.
