= James Erber =

British composer

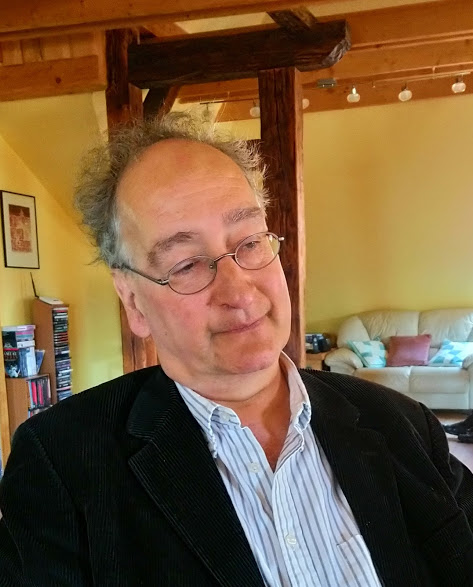
James Erber

James Erber (born 1951) is a British composer of the New Complexity school.

Born in London, Erber studied music at the universities of Sussex and Nottingham, and worked in music publishing from 1976 to 1979. His first work, Seguente for oboe and piano, appeared in 1976. In the early 1980s, he undertook serious studies in composition, first with Jonathan Harvey at Sussex, and then with Brian Ferneyhough at the Hochschule für Musik Freiburg.

Erber's works include Music for 25 Solo Strings (1981–84), Abiya (1994) for piano, the string quartet An Allegory of Exile (1992–95), the Traces cycle (1991–2006) for flute, and Am Grabe Memphis Minnies (1997) for guitar.

In addition to composing, Erber lectured for three years at Goldsmiths College, London (1991–94), and has written articles and given guest lectures.
