= New Complexity =

Music genre

New Complexity is a composition school in 20th-century classical music where composers seek a "complex, multi-layered interplay of evolutionary processes occurring simultaneously within every dimension of the musical material".

== Origins ==
Though often atonal, highly abstract, and dissonant in sound, New Complexity music is most readily characterized by the use of techniques which require complex musical notation. This includes extended techniques, complex and often unstable textures, microtonality, highly disjunct melodic contour, complex layered rhythms, abrupt changes in texture, and so on. It is also characterized, in contrast to the music of the immediate post–World War II serialists, by the frequent reliance of its composers on poetic conceptions, very often implied in the titles of individual works and work-cycles.

The origin of the name New Complexity is uncertain; amongst the candidates suggested for having coined it are the composer Nigel Osborne, the Belgian musicologist Harry Halbreich, and the British-Australian musicologist Richard Toop, who gave currency to the concept of a movement with his article "Four Facets of the New Complexity"; Toop's article emphasizes the individuality of four composers (Richard Barrett, Chris Dench, James Dillon, and Michael Finnissy), both in terms of their working methods and the sound of their compositions, and demonstrates that they did not constitute a unified "school of thought".

In the UK, particularly at the instigation of ensembles Suoraan and later Ensemble Exposé, works by "New Complexity" composers were for some time frequently programmed together with then unfashionable non-UK composers including Xenakis and Feldman, but also such diverse figures as Clarence Barlow, Hans-Joachim Hespos, and Heinz Holliger.

Although the British influence, via the teaching efforts of Brian Ferneyhough and Michael Finnissy, was decisive in the origins of this movement, initial support came not from British institutions but rather from performers and promoters of new music in continental Europe, particularly at the Darmstädter Ferienkurse where Ferneyhough coordinated the composition courses from 1984 to 1992.

Ferneyhough's Etudes Transcendantales, a song cycle for soprano and chamber ensemble, demonstrates many traits found in New Complexity music. In addition to being generally difficult to learn and perform, the pitch vocabulary makes heavy use of microtones—in this case, equal-tempered quarter tones. It also contains many tuplets of unusual ratios which are nested in multiple layers. Rapid changes, sometimes from note to note, happen in dynamics, articulation, and playing technique, including techniques such as multiphonics on the oboe, glottal stops for the voice, and key-clicking for the flute. According to Richard Toop, the rhythm for the oboe part in the first song is almost totally determined by a strict system with five stages of complexity, each governed by its own cycle of numbers.

== International spread ==
By 1997, the composers associated with the New Complexity had become an international and geographically disjunctive movement, spread across North America, Europe, and Australia, many of them with little connection to the Darmstadt courses, and with considerable divergence amongst themselves in styles and techniques. This can be seen in the range of nationalities of composers interested in this aesthetic direction, the international interest of ensembles in this music, and the impact of teachers such as James Dillon, Claus-Steffen Mahnkopf, and Brian Ferneyhough in both Germany and the United States.

One example of the international spread of the movement can be found in the Bludenzer Tage zeitgemäßer Musik during the leadership of the composer Wolfram Schurig from 1995 to 2006. Although numerous other compositional directions were represented as well, this festival was prominent during this decade for its support of composers associated with the New Complexity, in many respects replacing the Darmstadter Ferienkurse in leadership in this compositional direction. The international nature of its programming is clear from a large number of composers invited from North America; these included Ignacio Baca-Lobera from Mexico and Aaron Cassidy, Franklin Cox, Chris Mercer, Steven Takasugi, and Mark Osborn from the United States.

There are various individual performers who have become to varying degrees closely associated with the movement, among them flautists Nancy Ruffer and Lisa Cella, oboists Christopher Redgate and Peter Veale, clarinettists Carl Rosman, Andrew Sparling and Michael Norsworthy, pianists Augustus Arnone, James Clapperton, Nicolas Hodges, Mark Knoop, Marilyn Nonken, Mark Gasser, Ermis Theodorakis, and Ian Pace, violinists Mieko Kanno and Mark Menzies, cellists Franklin Cox, Arne Deforce and Friedrich Gauwerky. A number of ensembles are also known for performing New Complexity works, such as the Arditti Quartet, JACK Quartet, Ensemble Exposé, Thallein Ensemble, Ensemble 21, Ensemble SurPlus, and ELISION Ensemble. Works by Ferneyhough and Dillon, in particular, have been taken on by a wider range of European ensembles, including ensemble recherche, Ensemble Accroche-Note, the Nieuw Ensemble, and Ensemble Contrechamps.

== Other notable composers ==
- Mark Andre (France)
- Joël-François Durand (France)
- Jason Eckardt (US)
- James Erber (UK)
- Arthur Kampela (Brazil/US)
- Matthias Pintscher (Germany)
- Saman Samadi (Iran/US)
- René Wohlhauser (Switzerland)

== See also ==
- Avant-garde music
- Experimental music
- Minimal music
  - Holy minimalism
- Neue Musik
- New Simplicity
