= Vox Saeculorum =

Vox Sæculorum is an international society of contemporary composers writing in the Baroque style established in 2006. Vox Sæculorum was the primary focus of a feature-length article on period baroque composition written by Grant Colburn and published in the Summer issue of Early Music America Magazine.

Its founding members are:

- Mark Moya
- Giorgio Pacchioni
- Michael Starke
- Roman Turovsky

Other members include: Miguel Robaina, David Jansson, Glen Shannon, Roberto Bancalari, Hendrik Bouman, Matthias Maute, Fernando De Luca, J. Lee Graham, Gianluca Bersanetti, and Timothy Ariel Walden, Michael Talbot.
