= Joseph Dillon Ford =

American composer and writer (1952–2017)

Joseph Dillon Ford, 20 November 2003

Joseph Dillon Ford (February 6, 1952 – March 8, 2017) was an American composer and author.

== Life and career ==
Ford was born in Americus, Georgia. He held undergraduate degrees in music and graduate degrees in both musicology and landscape architecture. Although he focused on keyboard performance during his college years, Ford completed his training at Harvard as a Variell Scholar specializing in historical musicology. He studied twentieth-century composers and compositional techniques with Ivan Tcherepnin, the works of Bach and Handel with Christoph Wolff, Dowland and the English lutenists with John Ward, and the music of medieval Aquitaine with David Hughes.

His major works include three symphonies, a piano concerto, several harpsichord concertos and sonatas, choral music, and a large quantity of chamber and solo works for the piano and other instruments. Although most of his oeuvre is tonal—often very traditionally so, he also produced non-tonal work using both acoustic and electronic media, and developed synthetic chromatic dialects amenable to both idioms.

Keenly interested in emergent music and telecommunications technologies and the rich potential they offer for international creative collaborations, he also conceived and brought to fruition numerous large-scale projects in which his interdisciplinary artistic background proved to be an especially useful asset. These include the world's largest sound sculpture, an ongoing Web-based work that commemorates the monumental "Standing Buddhas of Bamiyan" demolished by the Taliban in 2001; the "Westron Wynde" Project (begun in 2004), for which composers in the US, Canada, and the UK each contributed music for James J. Pellerite (former principal flutist of the Philadelphia Orchestra); the Delian Suites Nos. 1 through 5 (2005–09), each exploring various tonal idioms (No. 4 in cooperation with the Colloque Fou de Basson, Conservatoire Gabriel Fauré, Angoulême); Nu Mu [sic!] Unlimited (2006–09), the world's first virtual new music festival; and Ye New Music Fayre (2008–09), a seminal event featuring new music composed in traditional tonal and modal styles.

Ford was the founder of the Delian Society, whose efforts to reinvigorate tonal music attracted many composers and performers on six continents and drew attention to the accomplishments of other outstanding artists.

Ford resided in Gainesville, Florida until his death, on March 8, 2017, at the age of 65.

== Major musical works ==
- Symphony No. 1 in G Minor ("The Muse in the Attic")
- Symphony No. 2 in C Minor (In Memory of John Fitch 1743-1798 - "The Fitch")
- Symphony in F (In Memoriam of Johann Wolfgang von Goethe)
- Piano Concerto No. 1 in C Major
- Sonata in A Major for Piano
- Sonata in C Minor for Piano
- Sonata in F Major for Piano
- Suite in G Minor for Two Violins
- Sinfonia No. 1
- Sinfonia No. 2
- Thanatopsis

== Published works ==
Joseph Dillon Ford published online Orpheus in the Twenty-first Century: Historicism and the Art-Music Renascence (2003), a multimedia e-book on music aesthetics; Chromatic One: A New Technique for Instrumental Speech (2003), a monograph detailing an innovative art form fusing music and spoken language; he also published numerous articles, poems, and short works of fiction including Selected Poems (1990) and Collected Musical Works (1992).
