= Liza Lim =

Australian composer (born 1966)

Liza Lim AM (born 30 August 1966) is an Australian composer. Lim writes concert music (chamber and orchestral works) as well as music theatre and has collaborated with artists on installation and video projects. Her work reflects her interests in Chinese culture and the aesthetics of Aboriginal art and shows the influence of non-Western music performance practice.

== Early life and education ==
Liza Lim (林瑞玲) was born on 30 August 1966 in Perth, Western Australia, to Chinese parents. They were doctors who during her early years spent time working and studying in Brunei, and she was sent to boarding school. At the age of 11, she was encouraged by her teachers at Presbyterian Ladies' College, Melbourne to turn from piano and violin to composition. Lim earned her PhD from the University of Queensland, her Master of Music from the University of Melbourne (1996), and her Bachelor of Arts from the Victorian College of the Arts (1986). She studied composition in Melbourne with Richard David Hames and Riccardo Formosa and in Amsterdam with Ton de Leeuw.

== Career ==
Lim has been a guest lecturer at the Darmstadt Summer School, the University of California, San Diego, Cornell University, Getty Research Institute, and the IRCAM Agora Festival. She was a lecturer of composition at Melbourne University in 1991. Lim was the guest curator for the twilight concert series of the 2006 Adelaide Festival of Arts.

Lim has been commissioned by performers including the Los Angeles Philharmonic (for whom she wrote Ecstatic Architecture for the inaugural season of the Walt Disney Concert Hall), Ensemble InterContemporain, Ensemble Modern, BBC Symphony Orchestra, Arditti String Quartet, and Cikada Ensemble. Her work has featured at the Festival d'automne à Paris, MaerzMusik, Venice Biennale, Huddersfield Contemporary Music Festival, and several Australian festivals.

Since 1986, Lim has worked with members of the ELISION Ensemble; she is married to Daryl Buckley, its artistic director. In 2005, Lim was appointed the composer-in-residence with the Sydney Symphony Orchestra for two years. Among other works, the orchestra commissioned—jointly with the radio station Bayerischer Rundfunk—her work The Compass; in its premiere performance on 23 August 2006 at the Sydney Opera House it was conducted by Alexander Briger and William Barton played the didgeridoo.

Sponsored by the German Academic Exchange Service, she spent one year in 2007/2008 as artist-in-residence in Berlin where she developed her third opera, The Navigator, inspired by Tristan und Isolde to a libretto by Patricia Sykes. She was appointed professor in composition at the University of Huddersfield in March 2008.

In February 2017, she was appointed to the composition unit at the Sydney Conservatorium of Music, where she is the Sculthorpe Chair of Australian Music.

== Selected works ==
=== Stage works ===
- 1991–93 The Oresteia. A Memory Theatre, opera
- 1994–95 Bar-do'i-thos-grol, 7-night installation performance based on The Tibetan Book of the Dead, artist Domenico de Clario
- 1991–99 Yuè Lìng Jié (Moon Spirit Feasting), A Chinese ritual street opera, libretto by Beth Yahp
- 2005 Glass House Mountains, installation work with artist Judy Watson
- 2008 The Navigator, opera for 5 singers, 16 instruments and electronics, libretto by Patricia Sykes

=== Orchestra works ===
- 1994–95 Sri-Vidya, Utterances of Adoration for choir and orchestra
- 1996 The Alchemical Wedding for orchestra (22 instruments)
- 2001–02 Ecstatic Architecture, commissioned for the inaugural season at the Walt Disney Concert Hall
- 2004 Immer Fliessender (Ever Flowing), a companion-piece for Gustav Mahler's Ninth Symphony
- 2005 Flying Banner, "Fanfare" for orchestra, after Wang To
- 2005–06 The Compass for orchestra with flute and didgeridoo soloists
- 2010 Pearl, Ochre, Hair String for orchestra
- 2010 The Guest for orchestra with recorder soloist
- 2024 A Sutured World for orchestra and cello soloist, for Nicolas Altstaedt; co-commissioned by Bavarian Radio Symphony Orchestra, Melbourne Symphony Orchestra, Amsterdam Cello Biennale, Casa da Música Porto
- 2026 Tongue of the Land for carnyx and orchestra, Lucerne Festival

=== Ensemble works ===
- 1988–89 Garden of Earthly Desire for flute, oboe, clarinet, electric guitar, mandolin, harp, violin, viola, violoncello, contrabass, percussion
- 1989 Voodoo Child for soprano solo, flute/piccolo, clarinet, violin, violoncello, trombone, piano, percussion
- 1990 Diabolical Birds for piccolo, bass clarinet, piano, violin, violoncello, vibraphone
- 1993 Li Shang Yin for coloratura soprano, 15 instruments
- 1995 Street of Crocodiles for flute, oboe, alto saxophone, alto trombone, cimbalom/cymbal, violin, viola, violoncello, baroque violoncello
- 1999 Veil for flute/bass flute, bass clarinet, trumpet in C, percussion, piano, violin, violoncello
- 2001 Machine for Contacting the Dead for twenty-seven instruments
- 2005 Songs Found in Dream for oboe, bass clarinet, alto sax, trumpet, 2 percussion, viola, cello
- 2005 Mother Tongue for soprano and 15 instruments, poems by Patricia Sykes
- 2006 Shimmer Songs for string quartet, harp, 3 percussion
- 2006 City of Falling Angels for 12 percussion
- 2007 Sensorium for soprano, C-tenor recorders, baroque harp, viola d'amore
- 2010–11 Tongue of the Invisible, a work for improvising pianist, baritone and 16 musicians
- 2014 Winding Bodies: 3 Knots for alto flute, bass clarinet, piano, percussion, violin, viola, violoncello and double bass

=== Chamber music ===
- 1996 Inguz (Fertility) for clarinet in A, violoncello
- 1997 The Heart's Ear for flute/piccolo, clarinet, violin I, violin II, viola, violoncello
- 1999 Sonorous Bodies for koto and voice solo, in collaboration with video artist Judith Wright
- 2004 In the Shadow's Light for string quartet, commissioned by Festival d'automne à Paris for the Kairos Quartett
- 2004–05 The Quickening for soprano and qin, commissioned by the Festival d'Automne à Paris
- 2008 Ochred String for oboe, viola, cello, double bass
- 2013–14 The Weaver's Knot for string quartet

=== Solo works ===
- 1992 Amulet for viola solo
- 1997 Philtre for Hardanger fiddle solo or retuned violin
- 2007 Wild Winged–one for solo trumpet
- 2007 Weaver–of–Fictions for alto Ganassi recorder
- 2007 The Long Forgetting for tenor Ganassi recorder
- 2008 Well of Dreams for solo alto trombone
- 2008 Sonorous Body for solo B♭ clarinet
- 2011 Love Letter for solo instrument

== Awards and nominations ==
In 2007, Lim's Sydney Symphony Composer Residency was nominated for an APRA Classical Music Award for Outstanding Contribution by an Individual, her piece Mother Tongue was nominated for Best Composition by an Australian Composer, and her piece Flying Banner (After Wang To) won the Orchestral Work of the Year Award.

In 2018, Lim won the Don Banks Music Award, which honours a senior artist of high distinction who has made an outstanding and sustained contribution to music in Australia.

The 2026 Grawemeyer Award for Music Composition ($100,000) was awarded to Lim for her cello concerto A Sutured World.

=== Other awards ===
- 1996 Australia Council fellowship
- 1996 Young Australian Creative Fellowship
- 2002 APRA Classical Music Award for Best Composition
- 2004 Paul Lowin Award for Ecstatic Architecture
- 2023 Member of the Order of Australia in the King's Birthday Honours
- 2024 Australian Laureate Fellowship
- 2026 13th Roche Commission
- 2026 Mauricio Kagel Music Prize
