= James Dillon (composer) =

Scottish composer (born 1950)

James Dillon (born 29 October 1950) is a Scottish composer who is often regarded as belonging to the New Complexity school. Dillon studied art and design, linguistics, piano, acoustics, Indian rhythm, mathematics and computer music, but is self-taught in composition.

Dillon was born in Glasgow, Scotland. Honours include first prize in the Huddersfield Contemporary Music Festival in 1978, the Kranichsteiner music prize at Darmstadt in 1982, and an unprecedented five Royal Philharmonic Society composition awards, most recently for his chamber piece Tanz/Haus: triptych 2017. The recording of his chamber opera, Philomela, won the Grand Prix de l’Académie du Disque Lyrique 2010. Dillon taught at Darmstadt from 1982 to 1992, and has been a guest lecturer and composer at various institutions around the world. He taught at the University of Minnesota School of Music in Minneapolis, Minnesota, from 2007 to 2014.

== Selected works ==
His major works include choral and vocal music, including the cycle L'évolution du vol (1993) and the opera Philomela (2004), the orchestral works helle Nacht (1987), ignis noster (1992), Via Sacra (2000), and La navette (2001), as well as a violin concerto for Thomas Zehetmair (2000) and the piano concerto Andromeda (2006) for his partner, Noriko Kawai, all showing an ease of writing for large forces. From 1982–2000, Dillon worked on the Nine Rivers cycle, a 3-hour work for voices, strings, percussion, live electronics and computer-generated tape. The epic work was first performed in full in Glasgow, November 2010. Andrew Clements of The Guardian awarded it a full five stars, describing the last movement ("Oceanos") as having a "Wagnerian grandeur" and stating, "The cumulative power of [Nine Rivers] is massive, the range of musical experience vast."

His considerable body of chamber music, often written expressly for a performer's individual abilities, includes solos for clarinet, drumkit, cello, flute, piccolo, guitar, violin, viola, and accordion, alongside nine string quartets (1983, 1991, 1998, 2004, 2008, 2010, 2013, 2017, 2018), the five-part Book of Elements for piano (1997–2002) and the soadie waste for piano and string quartet (2002/3). In 2013, Tom Service referred to the Book of Elements as "the most significant contribution to the pianist's repertoire since György Ligeti's Études". His fourth string quartet received the 2005 Royal Philharmonic Society Music Award for Chamber-Scale Composition. He won the same award in 1997 (for Traumwerk, Book 1), 2002 (for The Book of Elements 5), and 2017 (for Tanz/Haus: triptych 2017).

His music has been published by Edition Peters since 1982.

== List of compositions ==
=== Orchestral ===
- Windows and Canopies, small orchestra (20 players), 1985
- Überschreiten, small orchestra (16 players), 1986
- Helle Nacht, large orchestra (90 players), 1986–87
- Introitus – Nine Rivers 8, 11/12 strings, fixed media, live electronics, 1989–90
- ignis noster, large orchestra (100 players), 1991–92
- Blitzschlag, flute, large orchestra (66 players), 1988–96
- Via Sacra, large orchestra (80 players), 1999
- Concerto, violin, large orchestra (79 players), 2000
- La Navette, large orchestra, 2000–01
- Physis I & II, large orchestra, 2004–05
- Andromeda, piano, large orchestra (80 players), 2005–06
- torii, small orchestra (17 players), 2009–10
- White Numbers, large orchestra (77 players), 2011
- The Gates, string quartet, large orchestra, 2016
- Circe (Pharmakeia : 3), small orchestra (16 players), 2017
- Pharmakeia, small orchestra (16 players), 2020
- Polyptych: Mnemosyne... Acts of Memory and Mourning, large ensemble (30 players), 2022-23

=== Chamber music ===
- Crossing Over, clarinet, 1978
- Ti.re-Ti.ke-Dha, drum kit, 1979
- ...Once upon a Time, alto flute (+ piccolo), oboe (+ English horn), clarinet, bassoon, French horn, trumpet, trombone, double bass, 1980
- Parjanya-Vata, cello, 1981
- East 11th St. NY 10003 – Nine Rivers 1, 6 percussion, 1982
- String Quartet No. 1, 1983
- Zone (...de azul), clarinet, French horn, trumpet, trombone, violin, viola, cello, piano, 1983
- Le Rivage, flute (+ piccolo, alto flute), oboe, clarinet (+ bass clarinet), French horn, bassoon, 1984
- Sgothan, flute, 1984
- Diffraction, piccolo, 1984
- Shrouded Mirrors, guitar, 1988
- Del Cuarto Elemento, violin, 1988
- L'Écran parfum – Nine Rivers 2, 6 violins, 3 percussion, 1988
- La Femme invisible – Nine Rivers 4, flute (+ piccolo), alto flute (+ bass flute), oboe, English horn (+ oboe), clarinet, bass clarinet, 2 soprano saxophones (2nd + alto saxophone), piano, 3 percussion, 1989
- L'Œuvre au noir – Nine Rivers 6, bass flute (+ alto flute, piccolo, triangle), bassoon (+ contrabassoon, crotales), tenor-bass trombone, bass trombone, harp (+ sleigh bells), 2 cellos (1st + rainstick, 2nd + crotales), double bass (+ sleigh bells), 2 percussion, live electronics, 1990
- éileadh sguaibe – Nine Rivers 7, 2 French horns, 2 trumpets, tenor-bass trombone, bass trombone, tuba, 2 percussion, live electronics, 1990
- String Trio, violin, viola, cello, 1990–91
- nuée, bass clarinet, 2 percussion ad libitum, 1991 (section of L'Évolution du vol; may be performed separately)
- String Quartet No. 2, 1991
- Siorram, viola, 1992
- Lumen naturæ, violin, viola, cello, 1992
- Vernal Showers, violin, ensemble (flute [+ piccolo, alto flute], oboe, harp, guitar, mandolin, viola, cello, double bass, harpsichord, percussion), 1992
- L'Ascension, 2 percussion, 1993 (section of L'Évolution du vol; may be performed separately)
- Le Vent, l'arbre et le temps, double bass, 1993 (section of L'Évolution du vol; may be performed separately)
- Redemption, clarinet, violin, piano, 1995
- Traumwerk, Book 1, 2 violins, 1995–96
- Todesengel, clarinet, vibraphone, 1996
- String Quartet No. 3, 1998
- Eos, cello, 1999
- La Coupure – Nine Rivers 5, percussion, live electronics, film, 1989–2000
- Two Studies, accordion, 2001
- Traumwerk, Book 2, violin, harpsichord, 2001
- Traumwerk, Book 3, violin, piano, 2001–02
- The Soadie Waste, piano, string quartet, 2002–03
- The Magic Stick, piano, percussion, 2005
- Diogenes, bass clarinet, 2005
- String Quartet No. 4, 2005
- The Hesperides, cello, piano, 2007
- Theatrum: figuræ, oboe (+ English horn), clarinet (+ contrabass clarinet), bass clarinet, trumpet, trombone, 2 percussion, 2007
- String Quartet No. 5, 2003–08
- The Leuven Triptych, flute, oboe, clarinet, bassoon, trombone, harp, guitar, cello, double bass, piano (+ synthesizer), percussion, live electronics, 2008–09
- String Quartet No. 6, 2010
- Oslo/Triptych, flute (+ piccolo, bass flute, shortwave radio), clarinet (+ E-flat clarinet, bass clarinet, contrabass clarinet, shortwave radio), 2 violins, viola, cello, piano (+ harmonium/synthesizer), percussion (+ shortwave radio, voice transformer), 2011
- New York Triptych, flute (+ piccolo, alto flute, bass flute), oboe (+ English horn), clarinet (+ E-flat clarinet, bass clarinet), violin, viola, cello, piano (+ electronic keyboard), percussion, shortwave radio, fixed media, 2011–12
- String Quartet No. 7, 2013
- Darkroom, piccolo, bass clarinet, bassoon and alto saxophone, 2015
- Tanz/Haus: triptych 2017, flute, clarinet, electric guitar, violin, cello, double bass, piano, accordion, percussion, 2017
- String Quartet No. 8, 2017
- String Quartet No. 9, 2018
- The Freiburg Diptych, solo violin, tape and live electronics, 2019
- Prospettiva de’ perdimenti trombone and piano, 2020
- Masque, 8 players, 2021
- EMBLEMATA: Carnival, flute, clarinet, percussion, keyboard, violin and cello, 2021
- The Acrobat, accordion, keyboard and percussion, 2022

=== Choral ===
- Viriditas – Nine Rivers 3, 16 mixed voices, 1993–94
- Oceanos – Nine Rivers 9, 16 mixed voices, orchestra, live electronics, 1985–96
- Hyades, 12 mixed voices, 1998
- residue..., 24 mixed voices, 1998–99
- Vapor (text by Titus Lucretius Carus), 4 mixed voices, string quartet, 1999
- Stabat Mater Dolorosa, 12 mixed voices, 12 players, live electronics, 2014

=== Vocal ===
- Who do you love, female voice, flute (+ piccolo, bass flute), clarinet, violin (+ viola), cello, percussion, 1980–81
- Evening Rain, any voice, 1981
- Come live with me (text from the Song of Solomon), female voice, flute (+ piccolo, alto flute), oboe (+ oboe d'amore, English horn), piano, percussion, 1981–82
- A Roaring Flame (texts by Alexander Carmichael, Clara d'Anduza), female voice, double bass, 1981–82
- Time Lag Zero (text from the Song of Solomon), female voice, viola, 1982
- L'Évolution du vol, female voice (+ hurdy-gurdy), E-flat clarinet (+ bass clarinet, contrabass clarinet), double bass, piano (+ harmonium), 2 percussion, 1991–93 (sections 2–7 of its eight sections may be performed separately: L'Homme et la vérité, female voice, piano; L'Ascension; L'Être-ange, female voice [+ hurdy-gurdy], E-flat clarinet; Nuée; Descente/désir, female voice, bass clarinet, double bass; Le Vent, l'arbre et le temps)
- Temp’est, female voice, flute, piccolo, oboe, bass clarinet, soprano saxophone, bass trombone, percussion (2 players), piano, electric guitar, 2 violins, viola, cello, double bass, 1994
- Philomela (opera in five acts), solo soprano, solo mezzo soprano, solo bass-baritone, chamber ensemble, 2004
- Upon the cloudy night, countertenor, piano, 2009
- Narcissus, voice and piano, 2013
- The Louth Work: Orphic Fragments, soprano, clarinet, viola, cello, piano, percussion, 2016

=== Piano ===
- Dillug-Kefitsah, 1976
- Spleen, 1980
- black/nebulae, 2 pianos, 1995
- The Book of Elements vol. 1, 1997
- The Book of Elements vol. 3, 2000
- The Book of Elements vol. 2, 2001
- The Book of Elements vol. 4, 2002
- The Book of Elements vol. 5, 2002
- Charm, 2009
- Dragonfly, 2009
- Fujin, 2011
- faint light..., 2016
- amethyst, 2018
- Purple Blooms and Scarlet Stains, 2018
- echo the angelus, 2018
- Lament, 2022
- Ae, fareweel, and then forever!, 2022

=== Harpsichord ===
- Birl, 1986
