= Brian Ferneyhough =

British composer (born 1943)

- Born: 16 January 1943 (age 83); Coventry, United Kingdom
- Occupations: Composer; lecturer

Brian John Peter Ferneyhough (/ˈfɜːrnihoʊ/; born 16 January 1943) is an English composer. Ferneyhough is typically considered the central figure of the New Complexity movement. Ferneyhough has taught composition at the Hochschule für Musik Freiburg and the University of California, San Diego; he teaches at Stanford University and is a regular lecturer in the summer courses at Darmstädter Ferienkurse. He has resided in California since 1987.

== Life ==
Ferneyhough was born in Coventry and received formal musical training at the Birmingham School of Music and the Royal Academy of Music from 1966 to 1967, where he studied with Lennox Berkeley. Ferneyhough was awarded the Mendelssohn Scholarship in 1968 and moved to mainland Europe to study with Ton de Leeuw in Amsterdam, and later with Klaus Huber in Basel.

Between 1973 and 1986 he taught composition at the Hochschule für Musik Freiburg, Germany, where his students included Toshio Hosokawa, Joël-François Durand, Roger Redgate, Alessandro Melchiorre, Giulio Castagnoli, Kaija Saariaho, Joël Bons (winner of the 2021 Grawemeyer Award), Hans-Ola Ericsson, and Rodney Sharman.

The Royan Festival of 1974 saw the premiere of Cassandra's Dream Song, the first of several pieces for solo flute, as well as Missa Brevis, written for 12 singers. In 1975, performances of his work for large ensemble Transit and Time and Motion Study III were given; the former piece being awarded a Koussevitzky Prize, the latter performed at the Donaueschingen festival. In many of these events he was paired with fellow British composer, Michael Finnissy, with whom he became friends during his student days. In 1984 he was given the title Chevalier de l'Ordre des Arts et des Lettres.

Between 1987 and 1999 he was Professor of Music at the University of California, San Diego. His graduate students at UCSD included composers Chaya Czernowin and Mark Applebaum, among many others. In 2000, he became William H. Bonsall Professor in Music at Stanford University. For the 2007–08 academic year, he was visiting professor at the Harvard University Department of Music. Between 1978 and 1994 Ferneyhough was a composition lecturer at the Darmstädter Ferienkurse and, since 1990, has directed an annual mastercourse at the Fondation Royaumont in France.

In 2007, Ferneyhough received the Ernst von Siemens Music Prize for lifetime achievement. In 2009 he was appointed foreign member of the Royal Swedish Academy of Music. In 2012 he was awarded an honorary DMus from Goldsmiths, University of London; and in December 2018 he received an honorary degree from the Royal Birmingham Conservatoire for his contribution to contemporary classical music.

== Style and technique ==
Ferneyhough's initial forays into composition were met with little sympathy in England. His submission of Coloratura to the Society for the Promotion of New Music in 1966 was returned, with a suggestion that the oboe part should be scored for clarinet. Whilst Ferneyhough did find it hard, one source of support came from Hans Swarsenski who saw the same thing happen to Cornelius Cardew; Cardew enjoyed a prestigious continental reputation, but a poor one in his homeland. Swarsenski said of Ferneyhough: 'I've taken on an English composer who is I think is enormously talented. If this doesn't work, this is the last time'. Ferneyhough continued to struggle, but the aforementioned Royan festival marked a breakthrough for Ferneyhough's career.

From here, Ferneyhough became closely associated with the so-called New Complexity school of composition (indeed, he is often referred to as the "Father of New Complexity"), characterized by its extension of the modernist tendency towards formalization (particularly as in integral serialism). Ferneyhough's actual compositional approach, however, rejects serialism and other "generative" methods of composing.

He prefers instead to use systems only to create material and formal constraints, while their realisation appears to be more spontaneous. Ferneyhough has said that his meticulous notation counters the "institutionalized deracination" of contemporary music by restoring interpretative depth and theatricality, engaging performers in the work's sound-world through the physical and expressive demands of its realisation rather than mere reproduction of notes.

He has also been interested in challenging listeners' ways of absorbing musical information flow, prompting new kinds of temporal awareness by being presented with musical materials (events, objects, gestures, rhythms, textures) that contain their own sufficient complexity:

The more the internal integrity of a musical event suggests its autonomy, the less the capacity of the "time arrow" to traverse it with impunity; it is "bent" by the contact. By the same token, however, the impact of the time vector "damages" the event-object, thus forcing it to reveal its own generative history, the texturation of its successivity: its perceptual potential has been redefined by the collision. As the piece progresses we are continually stumbling across further stages in this catastrophic obstacle race. The energy accumulation and expenditure across and between these confrontational moments is perceived as a form of internalized metronome, and in fact it is a version of this procedure which most clearly fuels the expressive world of Mnemosyne: the retardational and catastrophic timeline modifiers are employed equally to focus temporal awareness through the lens of material.

His scores make huge technical demands on performers. The compositions have, however, attracted a number of advocates, among them the Arditti Quartet, ELISION Ensemble, the members of the Nieuw Ensemble, Ensemble Contrechamps, Ensemble Exposé, Armand Angster, James Avery, Massimiliano Damerini, Arne DeForce, Mats Scheidegger, Friedrich Gauwerky, Nicolas Hodges, Mark Knoop, Geoffrey Morris, Ian Pace, Carl Rosman, Harry Sparnaay, and EXAUDI Vocal Ensemble.

His opera, Shadowtime, with a libretto by Charles Bernstein, and based on the life of the German philosopher Walter Benjamin, was premiered in Munich on 25 May 2004, and recorded in 2005 for CD release in 2006. As is usual for Ferneyhough's works, the opera received mixed reviews.

== Selected works ==
=== Works for string quartet ===
- First String Quartet (1963)
- Sonatas for String Quartet (1967)
- Second String Quartet (1980)
- Adagissimo (1983)
- Third String Quartet (1987)
- Fourth String Quartet (1989–90)
- Fifth String Quartet (2006)
- Dum transisset I–IV for string quartet (2007)
- Exordium for string quartet (2008)
- Sixth String Quartet (2010)
- Silentium (2014)

=== Selected solo works ===
- Sieben Sterne for organ (1970)
- Cassandra's Dream Song for flute (1970–71)
- Time and Motion Study I for bass clarinet (1971–77)
- Time and Motion Study II for singing cellist and live electronics (1973–76)
- Unity Capsule for solo flute (1976)
- Lemma-Icon-Epigram for piano (1982)
- Kurze Schatten II for guitar (1989) (essay, analysis, analysis, score sample)
- Trittico per G.S. for double bass (1989)
- Bone Alphabet for percussion (1991) (score sample)
- Unsichtbare Farben for violin (1999) (score sample)
- Opus Contra Naturam, for solo piano (2000)
- no time (at all) for two guitars (2004), five pieces
- Sisyphus Redux for alto flute (2009)
- Quirl for solo piano (2011–13), part of Nicolas Hodges' Studies Project

=== For non-orchestral ensemble ===
- Prometheus for wind sextet (1967)
- Transit for solo voices and ensemble (1972–75)
- Time and Motion Study III for sixteen solo voices (3S, Mez, 4A, 4T, 2Bar, 2B), percussion and electronics (1974)
- Carceri d'Invenzione I for fl, ob, 2cl, bn, hn, tpt, trb, euphonium, 1perc, pf, 2vn, va, vc, db [1121, 1111.2111] (1982) (analysis, score sample)
  (inspired by the "Carceri d'Invenzione" by Giambattista Piranesi)
- Etudes Transcendantales for soprano and chamber ensemble (1982–1985)
- Carceri d'Invenzione II for flute and ensemble (1985)
- Carceri d'Invenzione III for fifteen wind instruments and percussion (1986)
- La Chute d’Icare for solo clarinet and chamber ensemble (1988) (program note)
- Terrain for violin and chamber ensemble (1992)
- Allgebrah for oboe and 9 solo strings (1996) (score sample)
- Incipits for solo viola, obbligato percussion and six instruments (1996)
- The Doctrine of Similarity for chorus (SATB), 3 clarinets, violin, piano and percussion (2000) (score sample)
- Chronos-Aion for large ensemble (2007–8)
- Renvoi/Shards for quarter-tone guitar and vibraphone (2008)
- Liber Scintillarum for 6 instruments (2012)

=== For orchestra ===
- Firecycle Beta for two pianos and two orchestras with five conductors (1969-1971)
- La Terre est un Homme for orchestra (1979)
- Plötzlichkeit for large orchestra (2006)

=== Opera ===
- Shadowtime (1999–2004), libretto by Charles Bernstein, premiered at the Munich Biennale

== Reception ==
Ferneyhough has been called "the most controversial composer of his generation". "In the same year [1974], the performance of several of his works at the Royan Festival established Ferneyhough as one of the most brilliant and controversial figures of a new generation of composers". "Brian Ferneyhough may well be one of the most important composers to emerge from the latter half of this century. Simultaneously famous and infamous, he is a controversial figure of world renown, bent on making the most out of music." The Guardian's Tom Service called La Terre est un Homme "one of the most significant achievements in late 20th-century orchestral writing", and also recommended the Carceri d'Invenzione pieces, Lemma-Icon-Epigram, Terrain, and the string quartets.

== Bibliography ==
- Ferneyhough, Brian. Brian Ferneyhough by Brian Ferneyhough. Paris: L'Age d'homme OCLC 21274317 (French)
