= List of people from Heilbronn =

This is a list of people who have lived in Heilbronn, Germany.

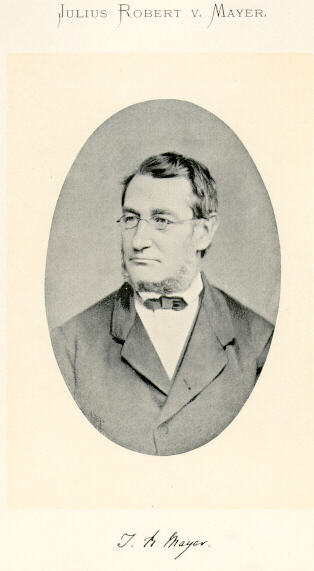
Julius Robert Mayer

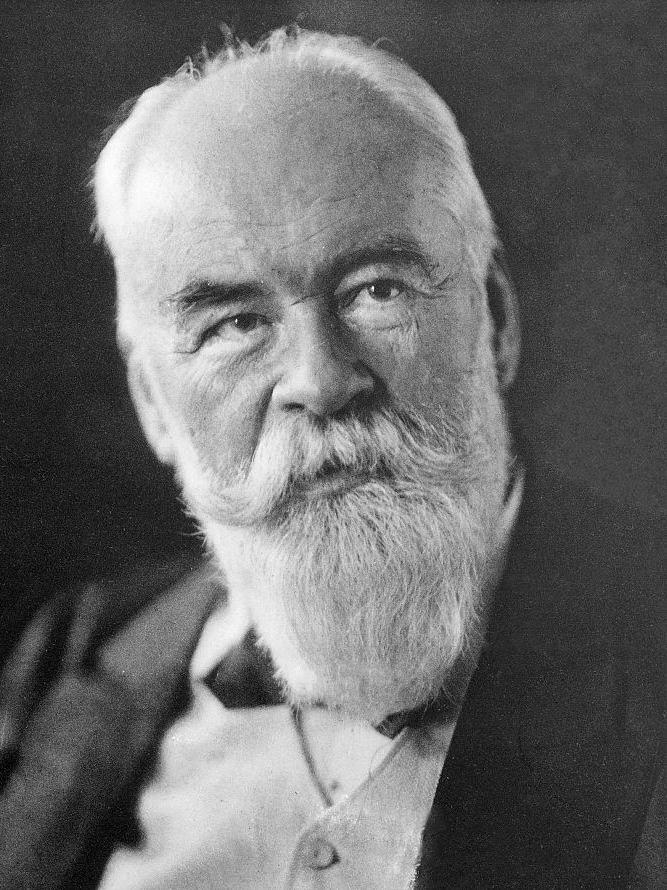
Gustav von Schmoller by Rudolf Dührkoop 1908

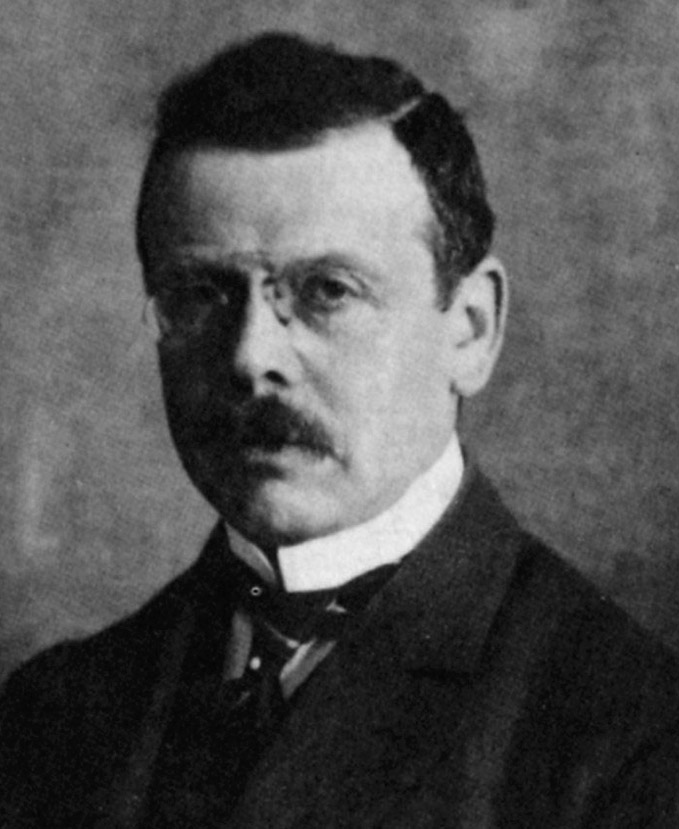
Siegfried Gumbel

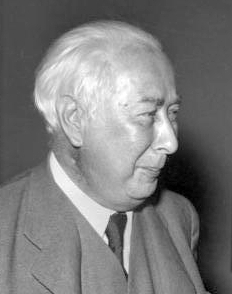
Theodor Heuss 1953

- Gustav Schübler (1787–1834), scientist (meteorology)
- Heinrich Friedrich Füger (1751–1818), painter
- Wilhelm Waiblinger (1804–1830), poet and author
- Julius Robert von Mayer (1814–1878), physician and physicist, formulated the principle of mechanical equivalence
- Ludwig Pfau (1821–1894), poet and revolutionary
- Adolf Cluss (1825–1905), architect, builder of numerous public buildings in Washington D.C.
- Gustav von Schmoller (1838–1917), economist
- Wilhelm Maybach (1846–1929), engineer and motor vehicle pioneer, developed the first fast-running gasoline engine together with Gottlieb Daimler
- Friedrich Stolz (1860–1936), chemist, invented in 1897 a predecessor of aspirin
- Siegfried Gumbel (1874–1942), lawyer, alderman (DDP), since 1933 head of the Israelite High Councillor for Württemberg in Stuttgart, died in Dachau concentration camp
- Theodor Heuss (1884–1963), politician, first President of the Federal Republic of Germany (1949 to 1959)
- Hellmuth Hirth (1886–1938), aviation pioneer, aircraft and airship builder
- Richard Drauz (1894–1946) in Landsberg Lech (executed as a war criminal), headed up the NSDAP in the Heilbronn district
- Walter Kreiser (1898–1958), aircraft designer and journalist
- Walter Vielhauer (1909–1986), politician (KPD)
- Joseph Asher (1921–1990), German-American rabbi
- Rolf Wütherich (1927–1981), passenger of the fatal car accident of James Dean
- Heinz A. Richter (born 1939), historian to the specialty Greece and Cyprus
- Dieter Schwarz (born 1939), entrepreneur and owner of the Schwarz-Gruppe. (Kaufland, Lidl)
- Rosemarie Haag Bletter (born 1939), German-American architectural historian
- Klaus Zwickel (born 1939), German trade union leader
- Andrzej Seweryn (born 1946), Polish actor
- Jürgen Schreiber (born 1947), journalist
- Heide Rühle (born 1948), politician (Greens) MEP, Federal President of the Greens 1990–1991
- Thomas Roth (born 1951), journalist, retired TV-presenter Tagesthemen
- Freddy Sahin-Scholl (born 1953 as Freddy Scholl), singer and composer
- Michael Wittmann (born 1956), musicologist
- Falk Struckmann (born 1958), opera singer (baritone)
- Joachim Schlör (born 1960), professor, author of Jewish history
- Thomas Strobl (born 1960), politician (CDU) Member of Bundestag
- Michael Georg Link (born 1963), politician (FDP) Member of Bundestag
- Michael Wenczel (born 1977), football player
- Sibel Kekilli (born 1980), German actress
- Michael Hackert (born 1981), professional ice hockey player
- Isabell Huber (born 1987), politician
- Dennis Klecker (born 1990), politician
- Corey Mapes (born 1992), hockey player
- Daniel Fischbuch (born 1993), hockey player

== Other notable residents ==
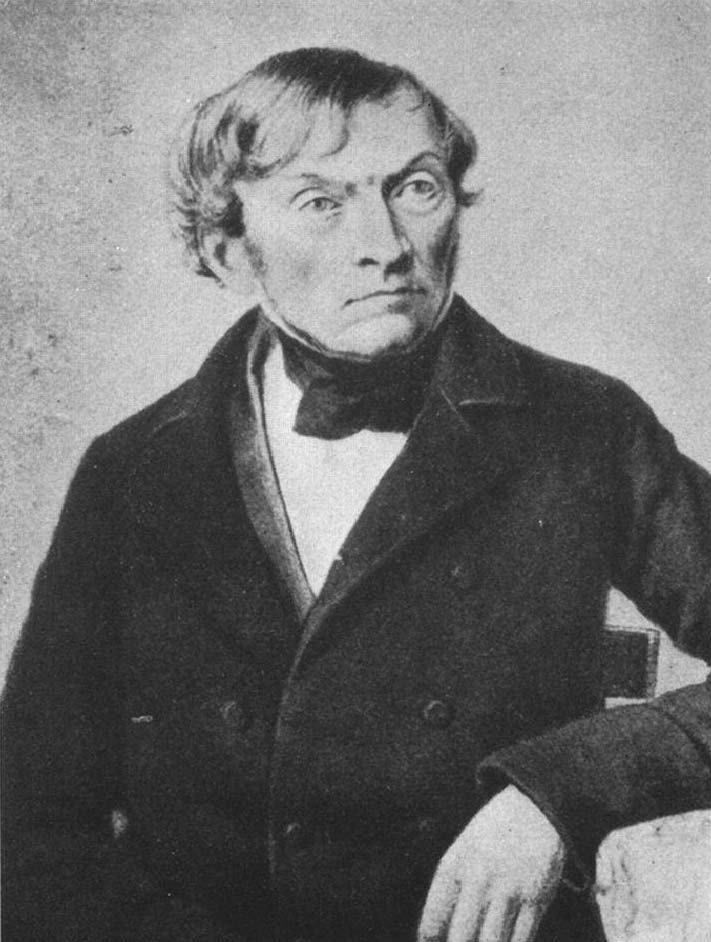
Karl Mayer

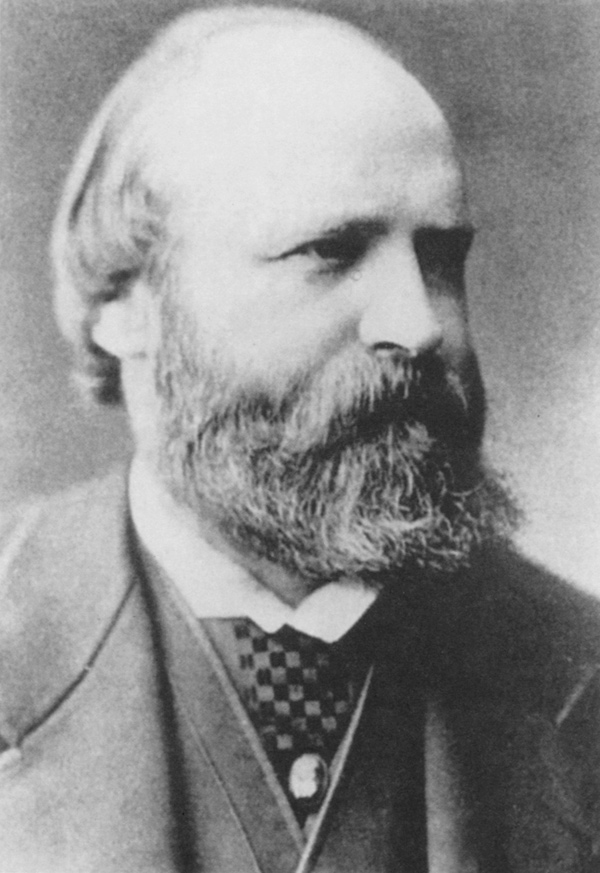
Kilian Steiner

- Martinus von Biberach (d. 1498), theologian, writer of famous epitaph
- Christian Friedrich Duttenhofer (1742–1814), theologian, pastor and prelate in Heilbronn
- Karl Mayer (1786–1870), poet, lived for a time in Heilbronn
- Louis Mayer (1791–1843), landscape painter lived for a time in Heilbronn
- Carl Heinrich Theodor Knorr (1800–1875), founder of the food business Knorr
- Alexander Bruckmann (1806–1852), historical and portrait painter, lived for a time in Heilbronn
- Gustav Rümelin (1815–1889), politician, lived and worked temporarily in Heilbronn
- Kilian von Steiner (1833–1903), banker, was lawyer in Heilbronn
- Max Eyth (1836–1906), writer, studied in Heilbronn
- Karl Nicolai (1839–1892) German magistrate and politician, from 1881 onwards Official notary in Heilbronn
- Max Cramer (1859–1933), teacher and genealogist in Heilbronn
- Theophil Wurm (1868–1953), prelate of Heilbronn 1927–29
- Ernst August Wagner (1874–1938), mass murderer, convicted and temporarily detained in Heilbronn
- Ernst Jaeckh (1875–1959), 1902–1912 editor of Neckar-Zeitung
- Oskar Dirlewanger (1895–1945), deputy director since 1933 of the Heilbronner labor office, later Waffen-SS officer and war criminal
- Emanuel H. Bronner (1908–1997), maker of Dr. Bronner's castile soap
- Walter Vielhauer (1909–1986), politician, mayor
- Marla Glen (born 1960), singer, living in Heilbronn since 1998
