= Matthias Brzoska =

German university teacher

Matthias Brzoska (born 24 June 1955) is a German musicologist. He researched and taught at the Folkwang University of the Arts in Essen.

== Career ==
Brzoska studied musicology in Marburg and Berlin with Reinhold Brinkmann, Sieghart Döhring and Carl Dahlhaus and French philology with Hermann Hofer.

From 1981 to 1986 he was an assistant lecturer at the Berlin University of the Arts, and received his doctorate in 1986 at Technische Universität Berlin with a dissertation on Franz Schreker. From 1987 to 1990 he worked in Paris on a research project financed by the Deutsche Forschungsgemeinschaft. In 1992 he habilitated at the University of Bayreuth with a study on the idea of a Gesamtkunstwerk.

He then became professor of musicology at the Folkwang University of the Arts in Essen. He has been Emeritus since 2022. His research focuses on opera, music and intertextual relations between music and other arts. He undertook various research projects together with his wife, musicologist Elisabeth Schmierer.

== Publications ==
- Schrekers Der Schatzgräber (Archiv für Musikwissenschaft. issue 27), Stuttgart 1988
- Idee des Gesamtkunstwerks in der Musiknovellistik der Julimonarchie (Thurnauer Schriften zum Musiktheater. Volume 14). Laaber, Laaber 1995.

As publisher

- with Elisabeth Schmierer, Susanne Fontaine, Werner Grünzweig: Töne, Farben, Formen. Über Musik und die bildenden Künste. Festschrift Elmar Budde zum 60. Geburtstag. Laaber, Laaber 1995. 2nd revised edition 1998.
- Hector Berlioz. Literarische Werke in 10 Bänden. Reprint of the edition Leipzig 1903 ff., with an introduction by the editor. Laaber, Laaber 2004.
- with Michael Heinemann: Die Geschichte der Musik. 3 volumes. Laaber, Laaber 2004.
- with Hermann Hofer, Nicole Strohmann: Hector Berlioz. Ein Franzose in Deutschland. Laaber, Laaber 2005.
- Die Geschichte der musikalischen Gattungen. Laaber, Laaber 2006.
- with Andreas Jacob, Nicole Strohmann: Giacomo Meyerbeer: Le prophète. Edition – Konzeption – Rezeption. Bericht über den Internationalen wissenschaftlichen Kongress (Musikwissenschaftliche Publikationen. Volume 33). Olms, Hildesheim 2009.
