= Michael Wittmann (musicologist) =

German musicologist, university teacher and writer

Michael Wittmann (born 1956) is a German musicologist.

== Life ==
Born in Heilbronn, Wittmann studied musicology from 1975 to 1980 (with Hans Heinrich Eggebrecht), philosophy and history at the Albert-Ludwigs-Universität in Freiburg im Breisgau. From 1980 to 1983 and 1987 he was a scholarship holder of the German Historical Institute in Rome. In 1986 he received his doctorate in Freiburg. From 1987 to 1990 he was a scholarship holder of the Deutsche Forschungsgemeinschaft. A research stay in Italy followed.

Since 1991 Wittmann has been a research assistant at the Musicological Institute of the Free University of Berlin. He has published works on the history of music theory in the Middle Ages, on the history of opera in the 19th and 20th centuries and on Berlin's music history. Wittmann strives for a close connection between music research and musical practice. As scientific advisor to the Berolina-Ensemble he has initiated the revival of forgotten composers such as Iwan Müller, Ernst Rudorff, Waldemar von Baußnern, Conrad Ansorge; in the same capacity Wittmann has initiated the rediscovery of operas by Saverio Mercadante, Michele Carafa and Francesco Morlacchi for the Rossini-Festival in Bad Wildbad. His editions of Otto Nicolai's previously lost operas Il templario and Die Heimkehr des Verbannten have led to a reassessment of this composer. (These and other editions have been published by the music publishing house he runs). Since 2012 he has been the publisher of the posthumous works of Emil Nikolaus von Reznicek, which are issued in the Editio Reznicek (Wedemark).

== Publications ==
- Michael Wittmann: Vox atque sonus. Studien zur Rezeption der Aristotelischen Schrift De anima und ihre Bedeutung für die Musiktheorie, Pfaffenweiler: Centaurus-Verlags-Gesellschaft (Musikwissenschaftliche Studien; 4), (Ph. D. dissertation, Freiburg University, 1986). ISBN 3-89085-188-6
- Riflessioni per una rivalutazione delle composizioni operistiche di Saverio Mercadante. In Gian Luca Petrucci, Giacinto Moramarco (edd.): Saggi su Saverio Mercadante. Cassano delle Murge, Messagi 1992, pp. 15–29.
- Meyerbeer e Mercadante? The reception of Meyerbeer in Italia. In: Cambridge Opera Journal 5/2 (1993), pp. 115–132.
- Das Bild der Italienischen Oper im Spiegel der Kritik der „Leipziger Allgemeinen Musikalischen Zeitung“. In Maria Teresa Muraro (ed.): Le Parole della Musica. Studi in onore di Gianfranco Folena, Firenze 1995, S. II, 195–226.
- Giovanni Simone Mayr's opera Medea in Corinto im Kontext der Medea-Vertonungen des 19. Jahrhunderts. In Franz Hauk, Iris Winkler (edd.): Werk und Leben Johann Simon Mayrs im Spiegel der Zeit, München-Salzburg, 1998, pp. 105–119.
- Article Saverio Mercadante. In Stanley Sadie (ed.): The New Grove Dictionary of Music and Musicians, 7th. Edition, London 2001, Vol. 16, pp. 438–448.
- Articles Saverio Mercadante; Elisa e Claudio; Donna Caritea; Il giuramento; La vestale; Il reggente; Orazi e Curiazi; Pelagio; Luigi Ricci; Crispino e la Comare; Giovanni Pacini; L'ultimo giorno di Pompei; Il corsaro; Saffo; Amilcare Ponchielli; I promessi sposi; La Gioconda. In Elisabeth Schmierer (ed.): Lexikon der Oper, 2 voll., Laaber 2002.
- Liberalismus im antiken Gewande. Mercadantes Metastasio-Vertonungen für Lissabon (1828) im politischen Kontext ihrer Zeit. In Peter Csobàdi et al. (edd.): Politische Mythen und nationale Identitäten im (Musik-)Theater. Vorträge und Gespräche des Salzburger Symposions 2001, Wort und Musik 54, Anif-Salzburg 2003, volume II, pp. 461–470.
- Franz Xaver Scharwenka – Komponist aus Posen. In Tomi Mäkelä / Tobias Robert Klein (edd.): Mehrsprachigkeit und regionale Bindung in Musik und Literatur, Interdisziplinäre Studien zur Musik, vol. 1, Frankfurt 2004.
- Article Saverio Mercadante. In Ludwig Finscher (ed.): Die Musik in Geschichte und Gegenwart, Personalteil 12, Kassel^{2} 2004, p. 116.
- Der ferne Klang des Jazz – Anmerkungen zu Ernst Kreneks Zeitoper „Jonny spielt auf“. In Markus Engelhardt (ed.): Festschrift Wolfgang Witzenmann, Analecta musicologica 36, Laaber 2005, pp. 567–581.
- Das verkannte Hauptwerk? Zur Entstehung von Otto Nicolais Oper Il proscritto/ Der Verbannte (Milan 1841/ Berlin 1849). In Thomas Betzwieser et al. (edd.): Bühnenklänge. Festschrift für Sieghart Döhring zum 65. Geburtstag, Munich 2005.
- Michele Carafa, I due Figaro (Milan 1820), Programmheft Bad Wildbad 2006.
- Saverio Mercadante, Don Chisciotte alle nozze di Gamaccio, Programmheft Bad Wildbad 2007.
- Ist Martinů ein tschechischer Komponist? Notwendige Anmerkungen zu einem heiklen Thema.
- Otto Nicolai. Il Templario (Torino 1840). Anmerkungen einer Wiederentdeckung. Programmheft Städtisches Theater Chemnitz März 2008.
- Emil Nikolaus von Reznicek, Benzin, Programmheft Chemnitz November 2010.
- Saverio Mercadante, I due Figaro, Programmheft Salzburger Festspiele, Pfingsten 2011.
- Otto Nicolai, Die Heimkehr des Verbannten, Donizetti Society, Newsletter 113 [2011], pp. 20–29.
- Saverio Mercadante, I briganti, Programmheft Bad Wildbad 2012.
- Notes on the world premiere of Saverio Mercadante's opera Francesca da Rimini (Madrid 1830), Newsletter of the Friends of the Music of Gaetano Donizetti No. 01/2012 (reprinted in Festschrift Becker).
- Francesco Morlacchi – Ein Revisionsfall für die Musikgeschichte. In Weberiana 25, (ed. Frank Ziegler), Berlin 2015, pp. 59–88.
- Emil Nikolaus von Reznicek und der Ständige Rat für internationale Zusammenarbeit der Komponisten. (Reznicek Studien 1), Wedemark 2015.
- Emil Nikolaus von Reznicek. Ein Forschungsbericht, Reznicek-Studien 2, Musikverlag H. M. Fehrmann, Wedemark 2015.
- Emil Nikolaus von Reznicek. Bausteine zu seiner Biographie, Reznicek-Studien 3, Musikverlag H. M. Fehrmann, Wedemark 2018.
- Anmerkungen zur modernen Erstaufführung von Saverio Mercadantes Oper Didone abbandonata, Donizetti Society Newsletter 135, London 2018, pp. 12–18.

Editions

- Klavierkonzert op 19 (1924) by Conrad Ansorge
- Omaggio al immortale Rossini by Saverio Mercadante
- Zwei Potpourris für Oboe und kleines Orchester by Saverio Mercadante
- Sinfonie A Rossini by Saverio Mercadante
- Il templario. Three-act opera by Otto Nicolai
- Il proscritto / Die Heimkehr des Verbannten. Three-act opera by Otto Nicolai
- Allegro alla Polacca für Streichquartett by Emil Nikolaus von Reznicek
- Das goldene Kalb Ballett in vier Bildern (1935) by Viggo Cavling. Music Emil Nikolaus von Reznicek
- Der rote Sarafan for military orchestra by Emil Nikolaus von Reznicek
- Ernster Walzer für Orchester by Emil Nikolaus von Reznicek
- Festouvertüre Dem befreiten Köln by Emil Nikolaus von Reznicek
- Frieden – eine Vision for mixed choir, organ and orchestra by Emil Nikolaus von Reznicek
- Gebet aus der Oper Emerich Fortunat by Emil Nikolaus von Reznicek arranged for military orchestra
- Grünne-March for military orchestra by Emil Nikolaus von Reznicek
- In memoriam – Supplementum (1928/36) by Emil Nikolaus von Reznicek
- Kantate Vom ewigen Frieden by Emil Nikolaus von Reznicek
- Konzertstück für Violine and Orchester by Emil Nikolaus von Reznicek
- Mea culpa – Vorspiel zu Das Opfer by Emil Nikolaus von Reznicek
- March (1915) for piano/military orchestra by Emil Nikolaus von Reznicek
- Praeludium und Fuge für Orchester cis-Moll (1st version) by Emil Nikolaus von Reznicek
- Praeludium und Fuge für Orchester cis-Moll (2nd version) by Emil Nikolaus von Reznicek
- Praeludium und Ganztonfuge c-Moll by Emil Nikolaus von Reznicek
- Potpourri from Die wunderlichen Geschichten des Kapellmeister Kreisler for salon orchestra by Emil Nikolaus von Reznicek
- Ouvertüre & Zwischenaktmusik from Die verlorene Braut by Emil Nikolaus von Reznicek
- Raskolnikoff-Ouvertüre Nr. 1 (1925) by Emil Nikolaus von Reznicek
- Ruhm und Ewigkeit - Four Monologues [after Friedrich Nietzsche] for alto/baritone and orchestra by Emil Nikolaus von Reznicek
- Streichquartett No. 2 C sharp minor by Emil Nikolaus von Reznicek
- Streichquartett No. 5 e-Minor by Emil Nikolaus von Reznicek
- Suite aus Die beste Polizei for string orchestra by Emil Nikolaus von Reznicek
- Valse pathétique for orchestra/salon orchestra/piano by Emil Nikolaus von Reznicek
- Vier Bet- und Bußgesänge for alto/baritone and orchestra by Emil Nikolaus von Reznicek
- Walzer-Serenade for piano trio by Emil Nikolaus von Reznicek
- Wie Till Eulenspiegel lebte by Emil Nikolaus von Reznicek
- Zwei Balladen aus fredericianischer Zeit für Bass und Orchester von Emil Nikolaus von Reznicek
- Hymnus für Verfassungsfeiern (1928) by Waldemar von Baußnern
