= Claudia Rosiny =

German academic

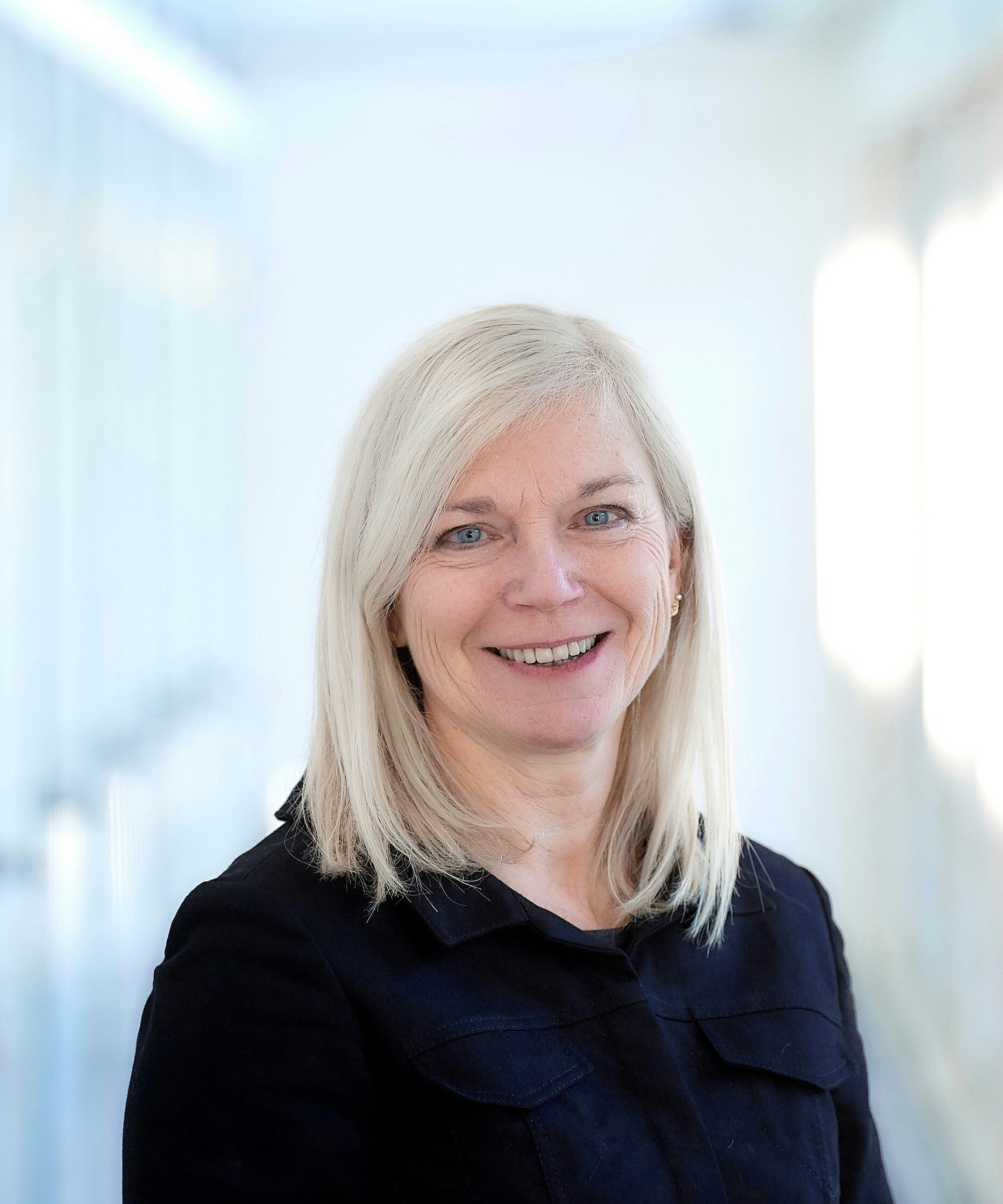
Claudia Rosiny (2021)

Claudia Rosiny (born 15 February 1960 in Bad Godesberg) is a German-Swiss academic in Dance and Media studies, a festival director and cultural manager. She became internationally known as an expert on video dance. Having served as a co-director of the Berne Dance Days for many years, she was in charge of the Performing Arts at the Federal Office of Culture Berne until February 2025 and until 2022 taught at the Lucerne University of Applied Sciences and Arts. She became a partner at Frieda KulturBeratung in 2025 and has volunteered as president of the Kinemathek Lichtspiel cinema in Bern since September 2024.

== Biography ==
Claudia Rosiny grew up the eldest of six siblings in the Herler Mühle, an old water mill in Cologne-Buchheim. Her father, Nikolaus Rosiny (born 19 July 1926 in Mülheim an der Ruhr, Germany; died 16 March 2011 in Cologne) was an architect, her mother Johanna Rosiny née Riedel (born 4 June 1936 in Prague), a psychotherapist for children and adolescents. After completing her training as a gymnastics teacher, Rosiny studied Theatre, Film and Television, German and Education at the University of Cologne (1983–1989). For three semesters, she also attended the Play-Music-Dance (Spiel-Musik-Tanz) course as a guest student at the German Sport University Cologne (Deutsche Sporthochschule Köln). In 1987/88 she did one semester of Theatre Studies at the University of Amsterdam. In 1997, she did a PhD with her dissertation being on Video Dance at the Institute of Theatre Studies at the University of Berne.

Since her studies Claudia Rosiny has devoted herself to her specialist fields of Video Dance and Intermediality in Dance: "Inter- and transdisciplinary cultural studies are needed in an art context of convergence, in which the disciplines come together, connect and enable new experiences of perception.(...) If time travel was possible, I would like to talk to the pioneers of film and dance, like Georges Méliès or Loïe Fuller, and ask them what, back then, fascinated them most in the interplay of movement of dance and film."

She is married to Reto Clavadetscher (born 1961). They have a daughter and live in Bern.

== Awards ==
- 2005 Cultural Prize Canton of Berne (Berne Dance Days) [Kulturpreis Kanton Bern (Berner Tanztage)]
- 1992 Cultural Prize Municipality of Berne (Berne Dance Days) [Kulturpreis Burgergemeinde Bern (Berner Tanztage)]

== Berne Dance Days ==
This festival of contemporary dance was established in 1987 by Reto Clavadetscher and co-directed by Claudia Rosiny from 1991 to 2007. Highlights of the Berne Dance Days include the themed festivals Danseimage (1996, re. dance and film) and Kunststückkörper (1997, re. dance and diverse body forms, including disabilities), and guest performances by renowned dance artists such as Maguy Marin, Wim Vandekeybus, Sasha Waltz, Meg Stuart and many others. The Berne Dance Days are documented on several media platforms:

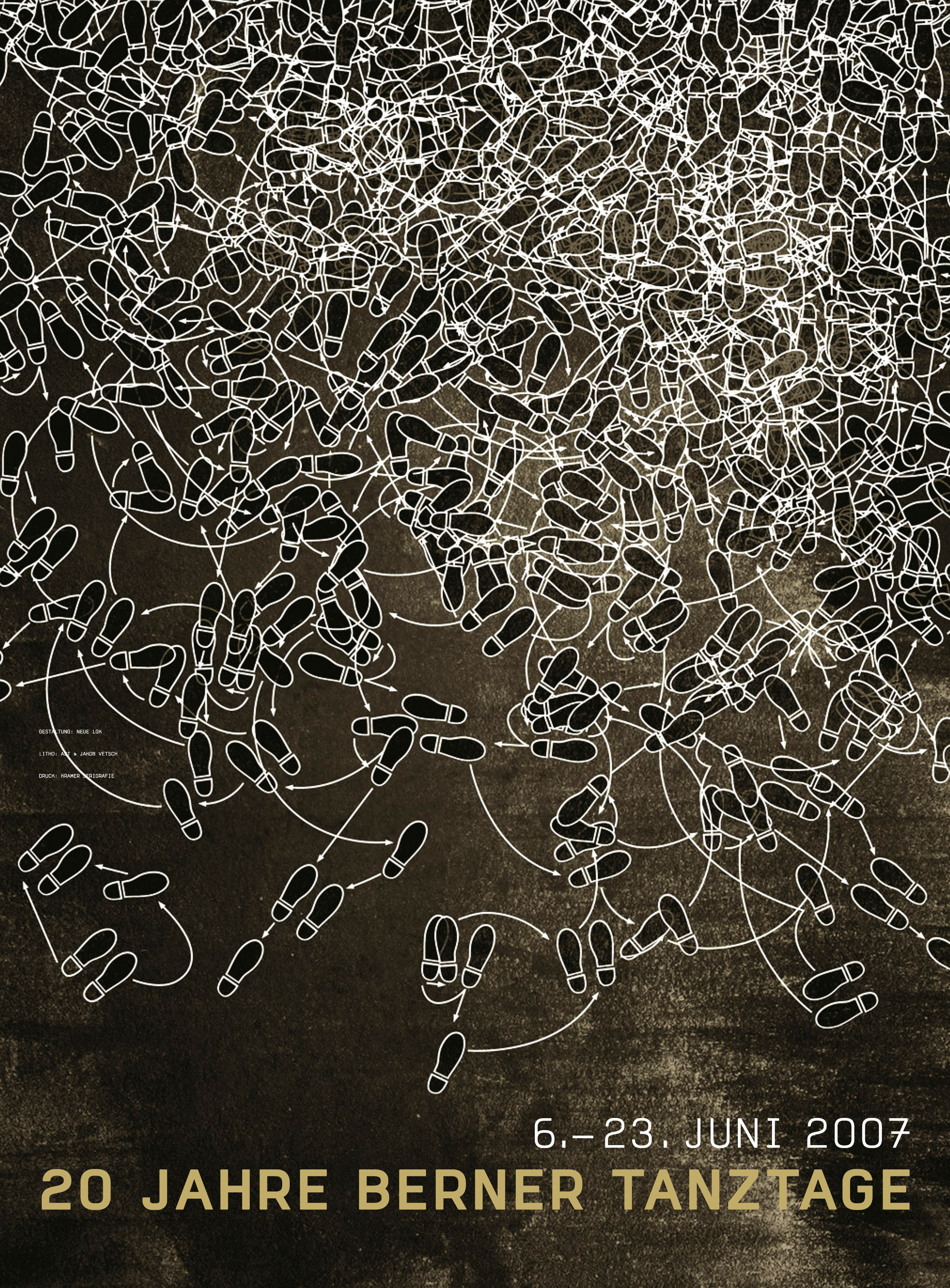
Poster 20 Years Berne Dance Days

- Around 250 video recordings of performances and projects from the years 1988 to 2007 were digitised and handed over to the Swiss Dance Archive (Schweizer Tanzarchiv/Collection Suisse de la Danse, today SAPA Swiss Archive of the Performing Arts) at the Zurich branch. Thus these recordings of historic significance were preserved and made available to interested members of the public.
- An extensive collection of documents on the companies that performed at the Berne Dance Days, a complete set of posters and programmes as well as other relevant documents were handed over to the Swiss Dance Archive (Schweizer Tanzarchiv/Collection Suisse de la Danse, today SAPA Swiss Archive of the Performing Arts) at the Lausanne branch for research purposes.
- In 2007, Rosiny, together with Reto Clavadetscher, published Contemporary Dance. Bodies, Concepts, Cultures – a Survey (Zeitgenössischer Tanz. Körper, Konzepte, Kulturen – eine Bestandsaufnahme). The book was published on the occasion of the 20th anniversary and final staging of the Berne Dance Days, in the meantime can be downloaded for free on the publisher’s website and is the first to be dedicated to contemporary dance in the German-speaking world.

== Kornhausforum Bern ==
Since its foundation in 1998, the Kornhausforumhas been a venue for design and social politics. The concept for its occupancy, demonstrating a pronounced bias towards culture, was determined via a referendum of the Bernese people. Over ten years (1998–2007) – first as a co-director (with Peter Eichenberger), then, from 2006 onwards, solely in charge – Claudia Rosiny steered its development as a cultural centre focusing on architecture, design, photography, video, new media and socio-political issues. In addition to around 300 events per year, more than 100 exhibitions were held during this time, including:

- Playfulness & Clarity. Swiss Architecture, Graphic Arts and Design 1950–2006 (Spielwitz & Klarheit. Schweizer Architektur, Grafik und Design 1950–2006), 2006
- Sex Work. An Exhibition on Prostitution (Sexarbeit. Eine Ausstellung zum Thema Prostitution), 2007

== Swiss Dance Archive ==
From 2009 to 2012, Rosiny worked as a specialist consultant on modern dance for the Swiss Dance Archive in Zurich, where she co-ordinated lecture programmes, acquired, amongst others, the Nachlass (estate) of Sigurd Leeder in 2011, oversaw a video project on early contemporary dance in Western Switzerland and, until the end of 2010, project-managed the fusion of the Archives suisses de la danse in Lausanne with the mediathektanz.ch in Zurich into the Swiss Dance Archive (Schweizer Tanzarchiv/Collection suisse de la danse) with branches in Zürich and Lausanne. It has existed in this new form since 1 January 2011. In 2018, it was merged with the Swiss Theatre Collection to form the SAPA – Swiss Archive of the Performing Arts.

== Teaching in higher education ==
As a lecturer, Rosiny is strongly committed to integrating dance practice, dance studies and film. From 1994 to 2005, she led seminars on Video Dance and Contemporary Dance at the Institute for Theatre Studies at the University of Berne, and from 2006 to 2011 proseminars on intermediality, postmodernism, dance, theatre and performance at the Institute for Media Studies at the University of Basel. From 2002 to 2015, she was a member of the programme management team and a lecturer on the continuing education course TanzKultur (designed for students in employment) at the University of Bern. From 2016 to 2018, she held the same position there for the newly designed Master of Advanced Studies in Dance/Performing Arts at the Institute of Theatre Studies and taught from 2012 to 2022 at the Lucerne University of Applied Sciences and Arts in the MAS Cultural Management programme.

== Dance film programming ==
Rosiny curated, academically contextualised and evaluated numerous dance film programmes:

- 1990 Dance films for the 34th International Summer Academy of Dance Cologne (34. Internationale Sommerakademie des Tanzes Köln)
- 1993–1997 Dance films Kellerkino Bern
- 1993 Video programming, Gulbenkian Foundation Lisbon
- 1994 Dance Screen Club Dada at the Styrian Autumn Graz
- 2000 Selection panel member, Dance for the Camera 6 for the BBC and Arts Council London
- 2003 Moving Dance Images, Dance Film Festival Kino Xenix MGB Zurich
- 2012 Women in Dance for the Migros Co-operative Federation
- Zurich as part of the Steps Dance Festival

== Jury and board memberships ==
Rosiny was on the jury panel of the Hans-Reinhart-Ring of the Swiss Society for Theatre Culture (Schweizerische Gesellschaft für Theaterkultur SGTK) from 2001 to 2006, of the German Video Dance Prize 2003–2004, the Swiss Dance and Choreography Prize 2002–2010 and the Dance Screen competition in Cologne (1999)and at the 20th anniversary edition of the festival Cinedans (2024) in Amsterdam. She also participated in the pre-selection for the 37th Dance on Camera Festival New York City (2008/9) and VIPER '01, the International Film & Videofestival Basel (2001).

From 1995 to 2005, she advised the Migros Cooperative Aare on dance funding and promotion, from 1993 to 2010 she was a board member of the Archives suisses de la danse, Lausanne, and from 1997 to 2003 President of the Commission for Theater and Dance, Canton of Berne. Since 2009, she has been a board member of Teatro San Materno, Ascona and, from 2025, an advisory board member of the Accademia Teatro Dimitri in Verscio/Ticino.

== Federal Office of Culture Berne ==
Since 2012, Claudia Rosiny has been in charge of Dance and Theatre, since 2021 until February 2025 for the Performing Arts at the Federal Office of Culture Berne in the Department for Cultural Creation and has been developing the new national awards policy of the federal government for these areas, with the aim of recognising the quality of professional artistic dance and theatre practice in all its diversity and strengthening it on a national level.

=== Swiss Dance Awards ===
The Federal Office of Culture has been awarding the Swiss Grand Award for Dance (CHF 40,000) from 2013 until 2019 every two years, as well as a Special Dance Award (CHF 40,000), two awards in the category Outstanding Female Dancer/Outstanding Male Dancer (CHF 25,000 each) and four Swiss Dance Awards (25,000 Francs each). In addition, the June Johnson Dance Prize in partnership with the Stanley Thomas Johnson Foundation (CHF 25,000). The Grand Award for Dance is awarded to honour a recipient's artistic career on the recommendation of the Swiss Federal Dance Jury.

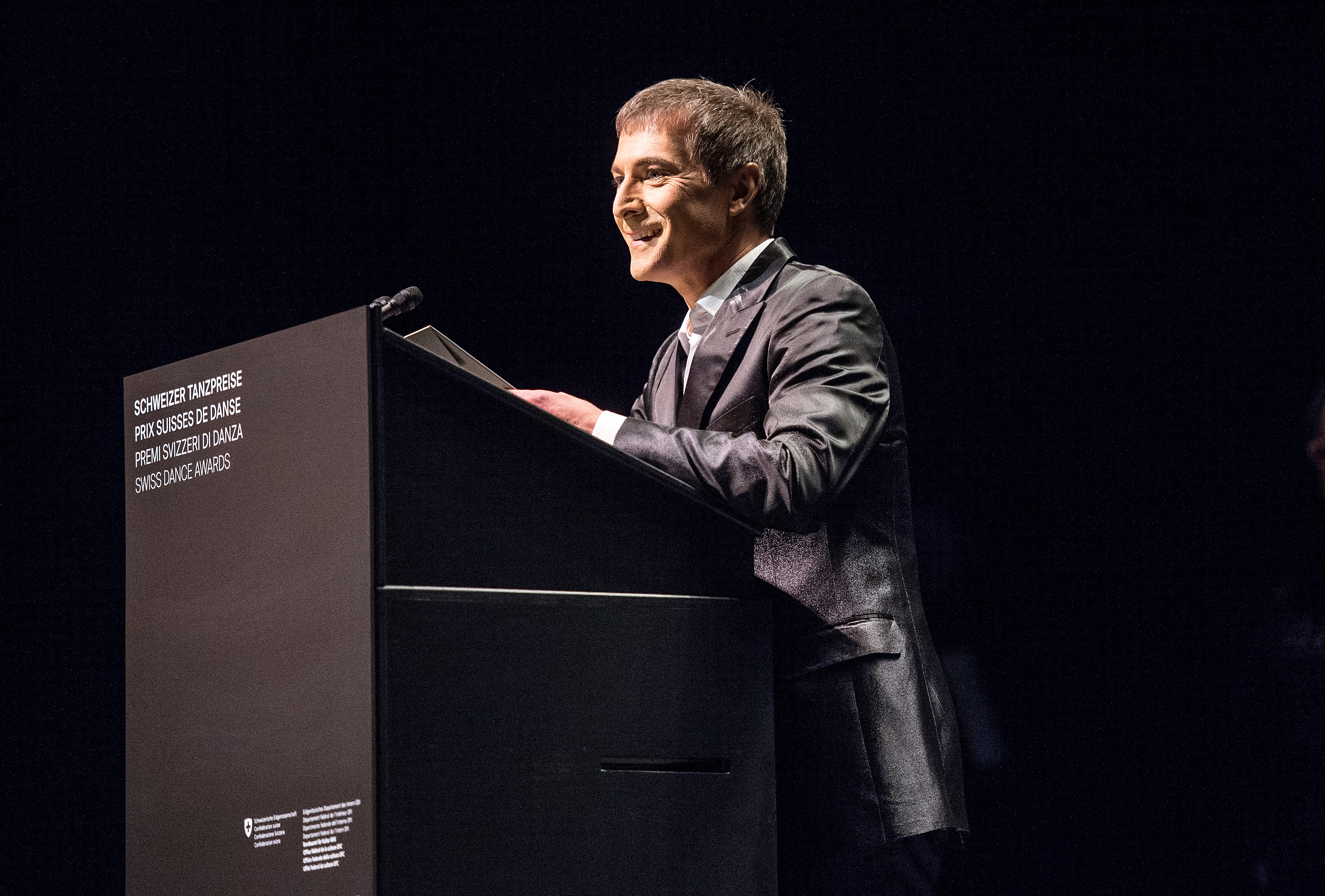
“Swiss Grand Award for Dance 2013“ for Martin Schläpfer

The first person to win this award was in 2013 the Swiss choreographer Martin Schläpfer, former artistic director of the Ballet am Rhein of the Deutsche Oper am Rhein Düsseldorf Duisburg. In 2015, the award went to the Geneva choreographer Gilles Jobin, in 2017 to Noemi Lapzeson, Geneva choreographer and founder of Vertical Danse, and 2019 to La Ribot, spanish-swiss choreographer and dancer.

=== Swiss Theater Awards ===
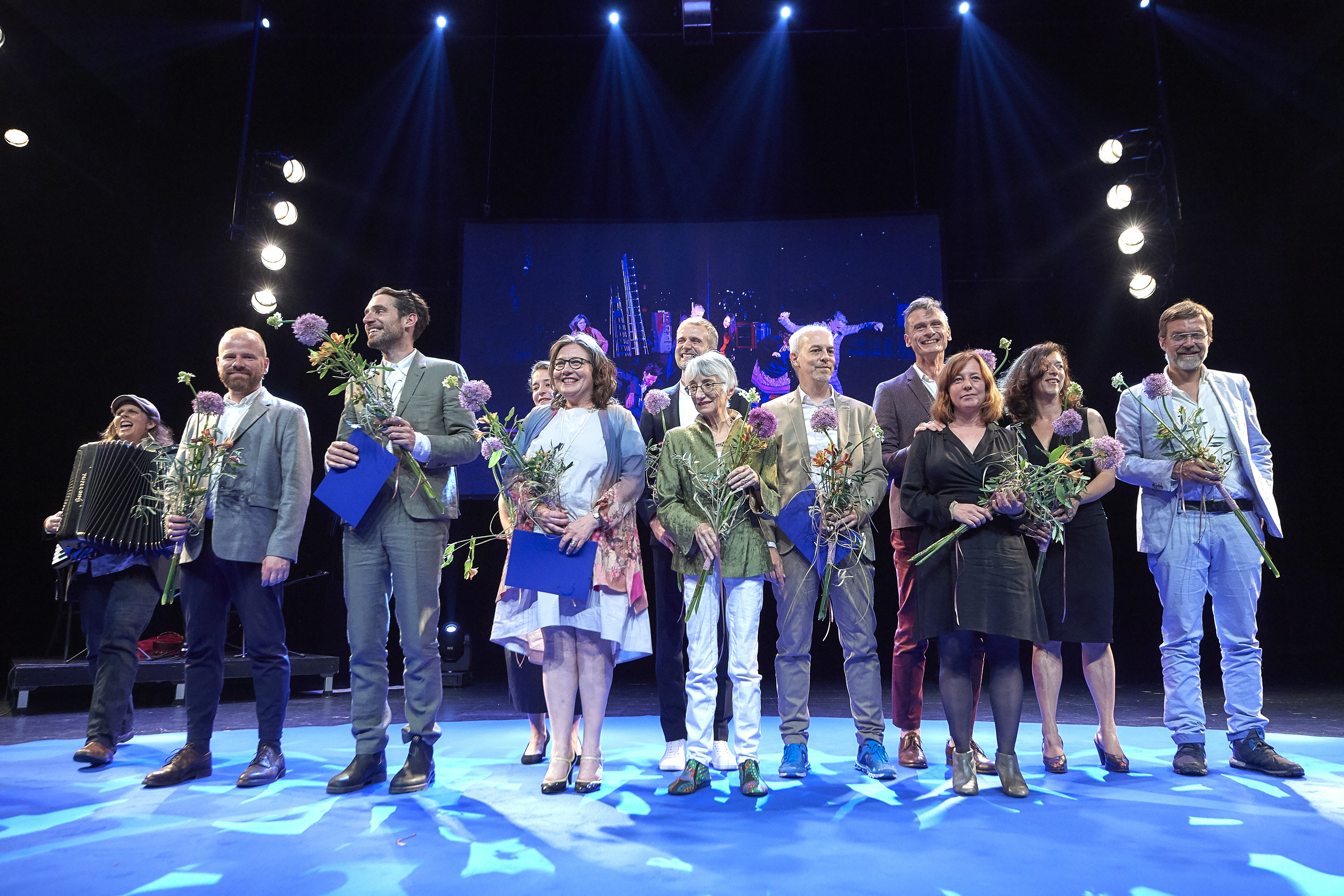
“Swiss Theater Awards 2019“

In the field of theatre, the Federal Office of Culture awarded the annual Swiss Grand Award for Theatre/Hans-Reinhart-Ring (CHF 100,000), a Swiss Cabaret (Kleinkunst) Prize and five Swiss Theatre Awards (CHF 40,000 each). In 2014, Omar Porras was the first recipient of the Swiss Grand Award Theatre, followed by Stefan Kaegi – Rimini Protokoll in 2015, the Zurich-based Theater HORA in 2016, Ursina Lardi in 2017, Theater Sgaramusch in 2018, Yan Duyvendak in 2019 and Jossi Wieler in 2020.

=== Swiss Performing Arts Awards ===
In 2021, the Swiss Dance Awards and Swiss Theatre Awards were merged under the umbrella of the Performing Arts. The aim of this change is to bring the disciplines of dance, theatre, the various forms that make up other facets of the performing arts such as performance, comedy, contemporary circus, puppet theatre and street arts closer together, and increase the visibility of the performing arts. It will also allow the Hans Reinhart Ring to be presented once again in all areas of the performing arts, notably dance. All awards are listed and archived on the Swiss Cultural Awards.

== Selected publications ==
=== Monographs ===
- Claudia Rosiny: Video Dance: Panorama of an Intermediate Art Form. ("Videotanz. Panorama einer intermedialen Kunstform"). Theatrum helveticum, ed. V. ITW Bern, vol. 5, Chronos, Zurich 1999, ISBN 978-3-905313-23-9
- Margrit Bischof, Claudia Feest, Claudia Rosiny (eds.): e_motion, Series: Dance Research Almanach (Jahrbuch Tanzforschung), Vol. 16, Lit, Münster 2006, ISBN 3-8258-9621-8, out of stock
- Claudia Rosiny and Reto Clavadetscher (Eds.): Contemporary Dance. Bodies, Concepts, Cultures – A Survey, (Zeitgenössischer Tanz. Körper, Konzepte, Kulturen – eine Bestandsaufnahme), Transcript, Bielefeld 2007, ISBN 3-89942-765-3
- Margrit Bischof, Claudia Rosiny (Eds.): Concepts of Dance Culture: Knowledge and Methods of Dance Research (Konzepte der Tanzkultur. Wissen und Wege der Tanzforschung), Transcript, Bielefeld 2010, ISBN 978-3-8376-1440-4
- Hedy Graber, Dominik Landwehr, Veronika Sellier (eds.), Peter Haber and Claudia Rosiny (co-editors): Digital Culture. Terms, Backgrounds, Examples (Kultur digital. Begriffe, Hintergründe, Beispiele), Merian, Basel 2011, ISBN 978-3-85616-530-7
- Claudia Rosiny: Dance Film. Intermedial Relations between Media History and Modern Dance Aesthetics (Tanz Film. Intermediale Beziehungen zwischen Mediengeschichte und moderner Tanzästhetik), Transcript, Bielefeld 2013, ISBN 978-3-8376-2329-1

=== Articles in encyclopediae ===
- Video Dance (Videotanz), In: Manfred Brauneck, Gérard Schneilin: Encyclopedia of Theatre (Theaterlexikon), 3rd New Edition, Reinbek 1992, pp. 1085–1086
- Encyclopedia articles on: Jean Deroc, Ricardo Duse, Susana Janssen. In: Historical Encyclopaedia of Switzerland (Historisches Lexikon der Schweiz (HLS)): Schwabe Basel, published 2002 onwards in 13 volumes.
- Articles on Dance: Deroc, Dietrich, Flamencos en route, Fritsche, Kreissig, Malfer, Mattis, Swiss Chamber Ballet (Schweizer Kammerballett), Steps, Susana, Video Dance (Videotanz), Zöllig. In: Andreas Kotte (Ed.): Encyclopedia of Theatre Switzerland (Theaterlexikon Schweiz), Chronos Zurich, 2005
- Change in Perception – From Dance Video to Video Dance (Wandel in der Wahrnehmung – Vom Tanzvideo zum Videotanz). In: Frieder Reininghaus & Katja Schneider (Eds.): Experimental Music and Dance Theatre. Compendium of Music in the 20th Century (Experimentelles Musik- und Tanztheater. Handbuch der Musik im 20. Jahrhundert), Volume 7, Laaber-Verlag Laaber, 2004, pp. 356–359. New edition Change in Perception – From Dance Video to Video Dance (Wandel in der Wahrnehmung – Vom Tanzvideo zum Videotanz). In: Siegfried Mauser, Elisabeth Schmierer (Eds.): Handbook of Musical Genres (Handbuch der musikalischen Gattungen), Volume 17,1: Community Music, Wind Music, Movement Music (Gesellschaftsmusik, Bläsermusik, Bewegungsmusik), Laaber-Verlag Laaber, 2009, pp. 299–301
- Lemmata Tanzfilm (Lemmata Tanzfilm), Video Dance (Videotanz), Motion Capturing, Amélia, Roseland, Lloyd Newson. In: Monika Woitas and Annette Hartmann (Eds.): Encyclopedia of Dance (Lexikon des Tanzes), Laaber-Verlag Laaber, 2013
- List of Publications Claudia Rosiny (1997–2016)
