= Die Heimkehr des Verbannten =

1844 opera by Otto Nicolai

Die Heimkehr des Verbannten Il proscritto
- Opera by Otto Nicolai
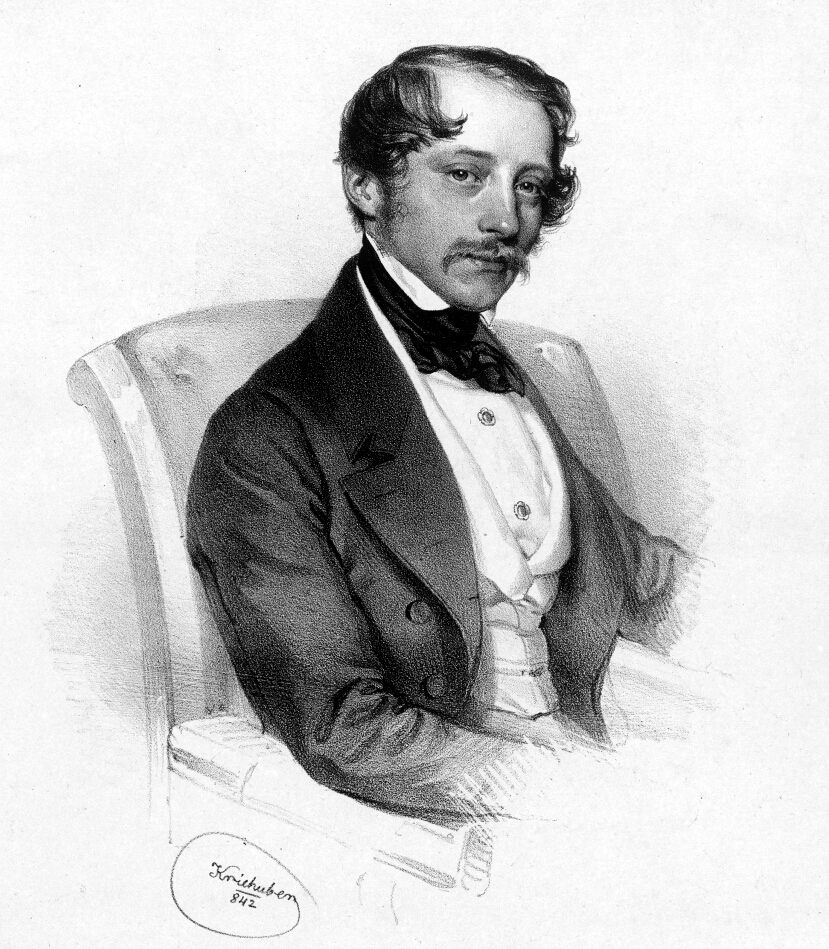
- Nicolai in 1842
- Librettist: Siegfried Kapper/Gaetano Rossi
- Language: German (first in Italian)
- Based on: Le proscrit by Frédéric Soulié
- Premiere: 3 February 1844; Vienna, Theater am Kärntnertor

Die Heimkehr des Verbannten (The Return of the Banished, 1844), (originally Il proscritto, 1841), is an opera by Otto Nicolai.

The libretto by Gaetano Rossi for Il proscritto, based on the play Le proscrit by Frédéric Soulié, had been given to Nicolai after being rejected by Verdi, this after Nicolai had rejected and given to Verdi Temistocle Solera's libretto for Nabucco. Whereas Verdi's opera was a triumph, Nicolai's, premiered 13 March 1841 at La Scala in Milan was a failure. On his return to Vienna Nicolai had Siegfried Kapper rework Rossi's libretto to produce Die Heimkehr des Verbannten, which premiered successfully on 3 February 1844 at the Theater am Kärntnertor in Vienna.

== Recordings ==
Year	Cast	Conductor, opera house, orchestra	Label
2011	Hans Christoph Begemann, Bernard Berchtold, Julia Bauer, Kouta Räsänen, Uwe Stickert, Tiina Penttinen, André Riemer	Frank Beermann, choir of Opera Chemnitz, Robert Schumann Philharmonic, January/February 2011, re-released 2016	Classic Produktion Osnabrück Cat: cpo4963367 (DDD)
