= Vielhauer =

Vielhauer is a surname. Notable people with the surname include:

- Philipp Vielhauer (1914–1977), German Lutheran pastor
- Walter Vielhauer (1909–1986), German communist
