= Ludomusicology =

Field of research on video game music

Ludomusicology (also called video game music studies or video game music research) is a field of academic research and analysis on video game music, which is the music found in video games and related contexts. It is closely related to the fields of musicology and interactive and game audio research, and game music and audio are sometimes studied as a united phenomenon. Ludomusicology is also related to the field of game studies, as music is just one element of video games as interdisciplinary mediums, and some theories relating to video game functions involve their music.

Ludomusicology has been mainly driven by musicologists. It not only examines the music in games and music-based games, but also the ways in which games and their music have become subjects of playful engagement themselves. The number of anthologies and monographs dealing with the specific subject of game music and music in game culture is steadily increasing. The ludomusicological community now organizes conferences, runs subgroups within the musicological societies, and engages in discourse with scholarly colleagues in a wide range of related fields.

== History ==
Academic research on video game music began in the late 1990s, and developed through the mid 2000s. Early research on the topic often involved historical studies of game music, or comparative studies of video game music and film music (see, for instance, Zach Whalen's article "Play Along – An Approach to Videogame Music" which includes both). The study of video game music is also known by some as "ludomusicology" – a portmanteau of "ludology" (the study of games and gameplay) and "musicology" (the study and analysis of music) – a term coined independently by Guillaume Laroche and Roger Moseley.

A prominent figure in early video game music and audio research is Karen Collins, who is associate professor at the University of Waterloo and Canada Research Chair in Interactive Audio at the University of Waterloo Games Institute. Her monograph Game Sound: An Introduction to the History, Theory and Practice of Video Game Music and Sound Design (MIT Press 2008) is considered a seminal work in the field, and was influential in the subsequent development of video game music studies.

In 2012, the Ludomusicology Research Group held its inaugural conference at the University of Oxford. This was the first conference in the world to be focused specifically on video game music. In 2014 the inaugural North American Conference on Video Game Music was held at Youngstown State University. Both conferences have since been held annually, at varying locations in Europe and North America respectively.

In late 2016, the Society for the Study of Sound and Music in Games (SSSMG) was launched by the Ludomusicology Research Group in conjunction with the organisers of the North American Conference on Video Game Music and the Audio Mostly conference. The SSSMG is the first international society dedicated to the study of video game music. In September 2017, the SSSMG announced the planned launch of a new journal dedicated to video game music and sound research, the Journal of Sound and Music in Games.

== Areas of enquiry ==
Ludomusicology examines any and all aspects of video game music and audio, some of which are described in brief here.

=== Interactivity ===
Interactivity is one of the major differentiating qualities of video game music, distinguishing it from other screen media music through the incorporation of player actions. In interactive gameplay, the sound and music played by the game can respond to the actions of the player within the game. Furthermore, as video games frequently feature non-linear or multi-linear timelines, their music can be similarly multi-threaded in both its form and its experience. Because each player takes an independently-chosen path through the game, any player's experience of a game's music will be different (considered as a whole) to any other player's experience from the same game, even though constructed from the same basic elements. Therefore, the intent and output of the composer and the music's effect on the player (which similarly varies from player to player) must both be considered during analysis.

A related concept to that of interactivity is that of immersion, which considers the ability of a video game to draw the player into a deep engagement with the game's diegetic space. Isabella van Elferen has developed a model of video game music immersion called "the ALI model", which understands player immersion to be a confluence of "musical affect, musical literacy and musical interaction":

- Affect: "personal investment in a given situation through memory, emotion and identification"
- Literacy: "fluency in hearing and interpreting... music through the fact of our frequent exposure to [it]", which builds on such literacy from other musical media
- Interaction: the player's reactions to music, and vice versa.

=== Technology ===
Historical studies of video game music usually incorporate examinations of game music technology. Technological limitations of audio chips in early consoles and computer systems were, in many ways, instrumental in shaping the development of both the functions and aesthetics of game music. For example, Karen Collins describes how the Television Interface Adaptor in the Atari 2600 created tones that could be out of tune by up to half a semitone; this led to minimal music in games for this platform, and substantial modifications to the music of ported games. Similarly, Melanie Fritsch observes the relative freedoms afforded to game composers by CD audio (higher quality, though limited to 79.8 minutes) and later MP3 (similar quality to CD audio but with compression minimising length restrictions), while also noting the challenges presented by writing increasingly detailed music to accompany hundreds of hours of gameplay. Another technology that has attracted significant academic attention is iMUSE, a MIDI-based system developed by LucasArts that allowed dynamic and smooth musical transitions, which were triggered by game conditions but which would occur at musically expedient (pre-designated) positions in the soundtrack.

Ludomusicology also investigates muso-technological practices in fields surrounding video games. For example, scholarly attention is turning to chiptune, which is the creation of music using old video game or sound chip hardware (a definition which is sometimes broadened to include the imitation of the resulting aesthetic).

=== Composition ===
Ludomusicology examines the composition of video game music, both in relation to and as distinct from other forms of music composition. Studies of game music compositional processes are often contributed by active composers and industry practitioners (for example, Winifred Phillips's book A Composer's Guide to Game Music, and Stephen Baysted's chapter "Palimpsest, Pragmatism and the Aesthetics of Genre Transformation: Composing the Hybrid Score to Electronic Arts' Need for Speed Shift 2: Unleashed"). A significant distinction of video game music composition is the need to incorporate the player's interactivity into the compositional process, and particularly as part of the negotiation of engagement and immersion. Composition is also at the nexus of creative potential and technological possibility, and throughout the development of game music (and particularly in its early phases) this has had significant effects on both compositional processes and game music aesthetics.

=== Music video games ===
Music video games, which use music as part of a dominant gameplay mechanism, are a focus of many ludomusicological studies. The clear relationship between music and gameplay in games like the Guitar Hero and Rock Band series facilitates the study of performance and performativity within gameplay, and provokes questions of musical ideology, performance practice and multimedia pedagogy. Kiri Miller writes that music video games feature a smaller disparity between the actions of player and avatar than is usually present in video games, and that this can encourage heightened levels of physical and musical engagement. David Roesner, Anna Paisley, and Gianna Cassidy have examined these phenomena within the classroom context, observing that music video games can inspire not only musical creativity, but the positive self-perception of musicality in students; they suggest that such effects can be used to encourage student engagement and development within both musical and non-musical curricula.

=== Relationship to music in other screen media ===
Because video games are (usually) screen-based media, there are strong links between the study of game music and the study of music in other screen-based media (like film and television). Concepts such as diegesis and acousmatics, which originate in film and film audio studies, are broadly applicable to video game music analyses, often with minimal adjustment. Furthermore, there are similarities between video game and film music techniques as varying stages throughout video game music history. For example, Neil Lerner notes a relationship between music in early/silent cinema and game music aesthetics from the 1970s onwards, on the basis of "largely nonverbal communication system[s]" and "continuous musical accompaniment". Similarly, Gregor Herzfeld compares the use of high energy music in Gran Turismo to the use of rock music in action films like The Fast and the Furious, due to associations with risky and/or exciting behavior.

However, it is also well noted within ludomusicological discourse that video games are very different media to film and television due to the player's interaction. Consequently, the application of concepts like diegesis does require a nuanced approach that takes the peculiarities of the video game medium into account. For example, Collins observes that linear approaches to musical analysis (such as the observation of synchronicity between musical and visual cues) fail to address the non-linear timescales that are typical of video games. This forms a basis of Collins's reiteration of a warning by video game theorists against "theoretical imperialism".

=== Research methods ===
Several academics have written about the research methods involved in ludomusicology. One of the more comprehensive of these studies is found in Tim Summers's book Understanding Video Game Music, in which Summers describes the process of "analytical play", wherein the analyst is "deliberately subverting the game's expectations of the player's actions.... At moments when game rules are tested, the architecture is often clearest. By playing experimentally (or using 'analytical play') to investigate the musical system in the game and comparing multiple play sessions, the musical mechanics of the game programming can be divined". Summers places this analytical method alongside more conventional sources of research data, both from inside the game (e.g., programmatic and musical information, the latter of which frequently involves the application of conventional musicology and music theory to the video game music text) and from texts and communities surrounding the game.

In her monograph Performing Bytes. Musikperformances der Computerspielkultur, Melanie Fritsch proposes an overarching ludomusicological theoretical framework, building on a subject-specific concept of performance that emphasizes the relationship between the two dimensions of performance ("ausführen" and "aufführen"). This concept is used as the initial step for developing an extended vocabulary on games and computer games, rooted in the relevant discourse of Game Studies. On that basis, a game performance theory is developed that allows to analyze gameplaying as a form of performance. In the next section an introduction to the theorization about "Music as Performance", as conducted by researchers such as Nicholas Cook, Carolyn Abbate, Philip Auslander and Christopher Small, is provided. Building on an understanding of music as a performative and playful process a terminological framework is developed that allows to analyze both games and music as playful performative practices, including questions of embodiment and socio-cultural aspects. The theoretical model is applied in six case studies to demonstrate how music as a design element in games, music games, and participatory musical practices in computer game culture can be fruitfully analyzed with this terminology.

== Research groups and conferences ==
=== Ludomusicology Research Group ===
The Ludomusicology Research Group is an inter-university research organisation focusing on the study of music in games, music games and music in video game culture, composed of five researchers: Melanie Fritsch, Andra Ivănescu, Michiel Kamp, Tim Summers, and Mark Sweeney. Together they organise an annual international conference held in the UK or mainland Europe. The Ludo2018 held in Leipzig, Germany, in April 2018, was the biggest Ludo-conference so far, attracting more than 80 participants from all over the world. The group was originally founded by Kamp, Summers and Sweeney in August 2011, who have also edited a collection of essays based around the study of game sound entitled Ludomusicology: Approaches to Video Game Music, published in July 2016. They also edited a double special issue of The Soundtrack and initiated a new book series called Studies in Game Sound and Music in 2017. In September 2016, Tim Summers' book Understanding Video Game Music was published by Cambridge University Press. Fritsch officially joined the group in 2016. She had edited the 2nd issue of the online journal ACT - Zeitschrift für Musik und Performance, published in July 2011 that included ludomusicological contributions written by Tim Summers, Steven Reale and Jason Brame. She had been a regular at the conferences since 2012 and published several book chapters on the topic. Ivănescu joined the group in 2021. Her monograph Popular Music and the Nostalgia Video Game was published by Palgrave Macmillan in 2019. Whereas Ivănescu, Kamp, Summers, and Sweeney have a background in Musicology, Fritsch has her background in Performance Studies.

=== North American Conference on Video Game Music (NACVGM) ===
The North American Conference on Video Game Music (NACVGM) is an international conference on video game music held annually in North America since 2014. The first conference was organised by Neil Lerner, Steven Reale, and William Gibbons.

=== Society for the Study of Sound and Music in Games (SSSMG) ===
In late 2016 the Society for the Study of Sound and Music in Games (SSSMG) was launched by the Ludomusicology Research Group in conjunction with the organisers of the North American Conference on Video Game Music and the Audio Mostly conference. The SSSMG has the aim of bringing together both practitioners and researchers from across the globe in order to develop the field's understanding of sound and video game music and audio. Its initial focus is the use of its website as a "hub" for communication and resource centralisation, including a video game music research bibliography (a project initially begun by the Ludomusicology Research Group).

In 2018, the Journal of Sound and Music in Games was launched in collaboration with University of California Press. JSMG is a specialist journal for scholars and industry practitioners of video game music and sound. While the core audience is game music scholars, the interdisciplinary nature of the field means that the journal encourages submissions from authors who identify primarily with other fields (such as game studies, computer science, educational science, performance studies etc.), as well as practitioners (game music composers, sound designers etc.). While JSMG primarily focuses on video games, studies of music and/or sound in any form of game (for example, sports, historical games predating video games, and so on) are explicitly welcome. JSMG's principal focus is original research articles, supplemented from time-to-time by a range of other content including review articles surveying important subjects, reviews of pertinent books and games, communications with responses, and interviews. The first issue is scheduled in early 2020.

=== AMS Ludomusicology Study Group ===
The Ludomusicology Study Group of the American Musicological Society was founded in 2015 and "is dedicated to facilitating academic research on music interactive media", including holding a panel on video game music as part of the annual meetings of the Society.

=== Ludomusicology Society of Australia (LSA) ===
The Ludomusicology Society of Australia was launched in April 2017, during the Ludo2017 conference in Bath, UK; it aims to "offer a centralised and local professional body nurturing game music studies for academics, people in industry and game music fans alike in the Australasian region."

== See also ==
- Adaptive music
- Video game music
- Musicology
