= Elmar Budde =

German musicologist (1935–2025)

Elmar Budde (13 June 1935 – 21 September 2025) was a German musicologist. He taught at the Berlin University of the Arts.

== Training and career ==
Born in Bochum, Budde studied piano and school music at the Hochschule für Musik Freiburg where he passed his state examination in 1961. After subsequent studies in musicology and Germanistic at the Albert-Ludwigs-Universität Freiburg, he received his doctorate in 1967 with a thesis on the early Anton Webern.

In 1972 he was appointed Professor of musicology at the State University of Music and Performing Arts in Berlin (today: Berlin University of the Arts).

His areas of research included the history of musical composition from the Middle Ages to the present; the music of the 19th and 20th centuries, the history of performance practice and interpretation and questions and problems of the interdisciplinary (music - painting - architecture) and finally the music of Franz Schubert.

Budde died on 21 September 2025, at the age of 90.

== Honour ==
- Elisabeth Schmierer, Susanne Fontaine, Werner Grünzweig and Matthias Brzoska (editors): Töne – Farben – Formen. Über Musik und die Bildenden Künste, Festschrift für Elmar Budde zum 60. Geburtstag, Laaber 1995, 2nd edition 1998

== Bibliography ==
- Anton Webern's Lieder op. 3.
- Schubert's Liederzyklen: ein musikalischer Werkführer.
