= Christoph von Blumröder =

German musicologist

Christoph von Blumröder (born 18 July 1951) is a German musicologist.

== Career ==
Born in Northeim, Blumröder studied musicology at the Albert-Ludwigs-Universität Freiburg in Breisgau with Hans Heinrich Eggebrecht, philosophy and history of the New German literature.

After his doctorate in 1979, Blumröder was a research assistant at the Handwörterbuch der musikalischen Terminologie (1972–2006). From 1980 Blumröder also taught at the university there, where he received his habilitation in 1990.

After assistant professorships at the University of Bonn in the winter semester of 1991/92 and at the Saarland University in the summer semester of 1995, he accepted an appointment as professor for contemporary music at the Musicological Institute of the University of Cologne in the winter semester of 1996/97. There he founded the cycles of events Composition and Musicology in Dialogue (1997) and Space Music (1998) as well as the publication series Signale aus Köln. Beiträge zur Musik der Zeit and was elected chairman of the association Signale aus Köln in 1999.

Furthermore, Blumröder is a member of the Centre for Modern Research at the University of Cologne and was involved in the Cultural Studies Research College Media and Cultural Communication from 2002 to 2007.

== Publications ==
- Der Begriff Neue Musik im 20. Jahrhundert (Freiburger Schriften zur Musikwissenschaft. XII). Munich/Salzburg 1981.
- Die Grundlegung der Musik Karlheinz Stockhausen's (Archiv für Musikwissenschaft, issue 32). Stuttgart 1993.
- (Editor): Karlheinz Stockhausen: Texte zur Musik 1970–1977. Volume 4: Werk-Einführungen, Elektronische Musik, Weltmusik, Vorschläge und Standpunkte, Zum Werk Anderer. Cologne 1978. – Texte zur Musik 1977–1984. Volume 5: Composition. Volume 6: Interpretation. Cologne 1989. – Texte zur Musik 1984–1991. Volume 7: Neues zu Werken vor Licht, Zu Licht bis Montag, Montag aus Licht. Volume 8: Dienstag aus Licht, Elektronische Musik. Volume 9: Über Licht, Komponist und Interpret, Zeitwende. Volume 10: Astronische Musik, Echos von Echos. Kürten 1998.
- with Wolfram Steinbeck: Die Symphonie im 19. und 20. Jahrhundert. Part 2: Stationen der Symphonik seit 1900 (Handbuch der musikalischen Gattungen. III, 2). Laaber 2002.
- François Bayle's Acousmatic music. In Chr. von Blumröder (edit.): Kompositorische Stationen des 20. Jahrhunderts (Signale aus Köln. Beiträge zur Musik der Zeit. Volume 7), Münster 2004, pp. 186–213.
- Neue Musik im Spannungsfeld von Krieg und Diktatur (Signale aus Köln. Beiträge zur Musik der Zeit. Volume 13). Vienna 2009.
- Musique concrète – Elektronische Musik – Acousmatic music. Konzeptionen der electroacoustic music. In T. Hünermann, Chr. von Blumröder (edit.): Topographien der Kompositionsgeschichte seit 1950 Pousseur, Berio, Evangelisti, Kagel, Xenakis, Cage, Rihm, Smalley, Brümmer, Tutschku (Signale aus Köln. Beiträge zur Musik der Zeit. Volume 16). Vienna 2011, pp. 196–206.
- Die elektroakustische Musik. Eine kompositorische Revolution und ihre Folgen (Signale aus Köln. Beiträge zur Musik der Zeit. Volume 22). Vienna 2017, ISBN 978-3-85450-422-1.
