= Hans Heinrich Eggebrecht =

German lexicographer, musicologist and music theorist

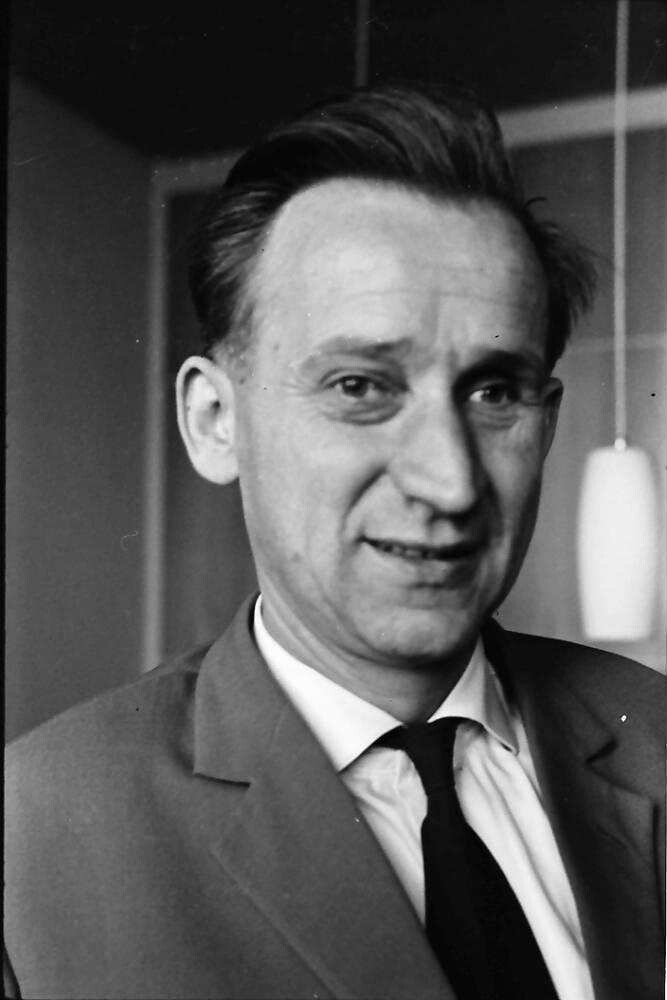
Image of Freiburg Universität

Hans Heinrich Eggebrecht (5 January 1919 – 30 August 1999) was a German musicologist and professor of historical musicology at the Albert-Ludwigs-Universität in Freiburg.

== Life ==
Eggebrecht was born in Dresden. His father Siegfried Eggebrecht was a Protestant minister and since 1929 superintendent in Prussian Schleusingen and early on sympathized with political right-wing movements. In 1933 he joined the German Christians.

At the beginning of his studies in 1937/38 at the Hochschule für Lehrerbildung in Hirschberg Eggebrecht was a member of the National Socialist German Students' League (NSDStB) and was temporarily active as a music consultant for Hitler Youth. With the beginning of the war he interrupted his music studies. After the military basic training he was transferred in February 1940 to the Feldgendarmerie. According to Claudia Zenck, who evaluated the estate in the Freiburg University Archive, he was only fit for service to a limited extent, also used every opportunity to make music during his training and afterwards, and was trained as a driver. His letters show that he did not like being a soldier. He took part in the Western Front and was stationed there in Besançon, busy with prisoner transports, patrolling and reporting journeys. From the end of September he was deployed in Krakow. In November 1940 he received leave to study for one semester at the Humboldt-Universität zu Berlin for a teaching post. After his examination he had to report to the troops in April 1941 and was stationed in Zagreb and at the Romanian border.

In 1941, shortly after the beginning of the German Attack on the Soviet Union, the Feldgendarmerie Department 683, 2nd Company, 3rd Platoon, to which Eggebrecht belonged, was deployed as part of the 11th Army in the conquest of the Crimea. He served mainly as a messenger rider on a motorcycle. On 14 November 1941 the unit reached Simferopol. In cooperation with the SS-Einsatzgruppe D under Otto Ohlendorf, which was too understaffed to operate alone, parts of the field police force took also part in a SD massacre of "at least 5,000 people from Simferopol" from 9 to 13 December 1941. Whether and to what extent Eggebrecht was involved in the events is controversial. According to researcher Claudia Maurer Zenck, he was released from duty in those days until Christmas in order to prepare for the NCO examination and was also promoted to NCO one day before Christmas; his involvement was not yet proven by any source, not even indirectly. According to music historian Boris von Haken Eggebrecht stood in the so-called trellis for at least one day, through which the victims were driven immediately before their murder; this assertion was meanwhile rejected as unprovable and even unlikely. On the state of Hakens' research in the middle of 2013 Die Zeit published an article. Haken refers to seven field post letters from Eggebrecht to members of the fellowship Johann Sebastian Bach of the NSD-Studentenbund in Berlin in particular from 1942/43, which he discovered and which according to Haken show a National Socialist attitude.

Two days after the fall of Sevastopol, Eggebrecht appeared on the radio as a pianist and played Mozart and Beethoven (6 July). In the period before that, he was also involved in guarding POWs, a large number of whom were involved in the conquest of the Kerch Peninsula. In 1942 Eggebrecht was transferred to the fighting troops of Panzerjägerabteilung 28, with which he was on the Leningrad front. In July 1944 he was seriously wounded. He received the East Medal (Medal Winter Battle in the East 1941/42, August 1942), the Iron Cross 1st and 2nd Class. B. v. Haken expresses himself inaccurately, in any case no "knight's cross": (as knight's cross bearer/oak-leaf bearer not listed see Walther-Peer Fellgiebel: The bearers of the knight's cross of the Iron Cross 1939–1945. 1996, ISBN 3-7909-0284-5) and was severely wounded at the end of the war in 1945. Eggebrecht consistently concealed his activities in the field police from 1945 and claimed that he had been with the tank fighters throughout the war and then with the infantry.

Eggebrecht studied from autumn 1945 with Richard Münnich, Hans Joachim Moser and Max Schneider in Weimar, Berlin, Munich and Jena, where he promoviert as Dr. phil. In 1949, without having to face a denazification trial, he received an assistant position with Walther Vetter at the Institute of Musicology of the Humboldt University of Berlin. In 1951 Wilibald Gurlitt, who had been dismissed as Jüdisch versippt in 1937, brought him to the University of Freiburg. habilitierte in 1955, Eggebrecht obtained his doctorate from Gurlitt. He then took up a position as a private lecturer at the University of Erlangen-Nuremberg, which he temporarily interrupted in 1956/57 for a substitute professorship at the Ruprecht-Karls-Universität Heidelberg. From 1961 until his Emeritus in 1987, Eggebrecht succeeded Gurlitt as professor and director of the Department of Musicology at the University of Freiburg.

== Work ==
Already in 1955 Eggebrecht presented the Academy of Sciences and Literature in Mainz with a report entitled Studien zur musikalischen Terminologie. However, it was to take until 1972 before this project could be implemented in Freiburg im Breisgau and the first deliveries of the Handwörterbuch der musikalischen Terminologie appeared. Eggebrecht remained the main editor of this exemplary terminological lexicon until 1999.

Eggebrecht's main research interests were the music of Heinrich Schütz, Johann Sebastian Bach and Protestant church music in general, the music of the First Viennese School, Gustav Mahler and the music of the 20th century. He regarded his editions of medieval music treatises merely as proof of aptitude vis-à-vis the " Guild", but together with the editions of his pupils they set standards for research into medieval music theory. He wrote some of his writings together with the musicologist Carl Dahlhaus. Among his students were Peter Andraschke, Christoph von Blumröder, Werner Breig, Reinhold Brinkmann, Elmar Budde, Fritz Reckow, Albrecht Riethmüller, Wolfram Steinbeck and Michael Wittmann.

His aesthetics of music approach was committed to the thought of Roman Ingarden. The reception of works of art thus runs through several layers of perception, a perception with different qualities each.

Eggebrecht's book Zur Geschichte der Beethoven-Rezeption in 1972 was criticized for continuing the cliché of the titan and fighter. From 1933 to 1945 remained omitted in it. In 1991 his work Musik im Abendland was published. Processes and Stations from the Middle Ages to the Present, an overall presentation of his reading of European music history, which he enriched with methodical reflections on the writing of music history.

Unlike many musicologists, Eggebrecht sought dialogue with a number of contemporary composers (for example with Wolfgang Rihm, who studied with him in Freiburg, Karlheinz Stockhausen and Mathias Spahlinger).

Eggebrecht was an honorary doctor of the University of Bologna and the Masaryk University. Contrary to Volker Hagedorn's assertion, "Unlike Dahlhaus, Eggebrecht remained almost untranslated, a German phenomenon," Eggebrecht's book on Bach's The Art of the Fugue was translated into English in 1993 and published under the title J. S. Bach's the Art of Fugue. The Work and Its Interpretation; in 2009 Ashgate Publishers issued an English translation of the book Understanding Music. Translated into Italian and Czech: The Music of Gustav Mahler and Music in the Occident. Christoph Keller's rhetorical question from 1997, "whether a Mahler critique like his can be written after Auschwitz and whether it can be written by someone who belonged to Hitler's Wehrmacht", can be criticized with good reasons.

Egggebrecht died in Freiburg im Breisgau at age 80.

== Publications ==
- with Willibald Gurlitt: Riemanns Musiklexikon, in 3 volumes. Verlag Schott & Söhne, 1959, 1961, 1967.
- Die Orgelbewegung. Musikwissenschaftliche Verlagsgesellschaft, 1967.
- Zur Geschichte der Beethoven-Rezeption. 1972.
- Handwörterbuch der musikalischen Terminologie. 1972.
- Zur Terminologie der Musik des 20.Jahrhunderts. Zweites Kolloquium der Walcker-Stiftung März 1972. Musicological Publishing Societies, 1972.
- Musik im Abendland: Prozesse und Stationen vom Mittelalter bis zur Gegenwart. Piper Verlag, 1991.
- Die Musik Gustav Mahlers. Piper Verlag, 1991.
- Bach – Wer ist das? Zum Verständnis der Musik Johann Sebastian Bachs. Verlag Piper/Schott, 1994.
- Bachs Kunst der Fuge. Erscheinung und Deutung (Taschenbücher zur Musikwissenschaft. Volume 127). 4th edition. Verlag Florian Noetzel, Wilhelmshaven 1998, ISBN 3-7959-0725-X.
- Geschichte der Musik als Gegenwart. Hans Heinrich Eggebrecht und Mathias Spahlinger im Gespräch. Verlag Edition text & Kritik, 2000.
