= Elisabeth Schmierer =

German musicologist university teacher

Elisabeth Schmierer (born in 1955) is a German musicologist. She researches and teaches at the Folkwang University of the Arts in Essen.

== Career ==
Born in Tübingen, Schmierer graduated from high school in Freudenstadt and initially studied school music at the State University of Music and Performing Arts Stuttgart. This was followed by studies in musicology, history and art history at the University of Kiel, where she also received her doctorate in 1989. Her habilitation was completed at the Technische Universität Berlin. She has been teaching at Essen since 2000. She is married to Matthias Brzoska.

== Publications ==
- Die Orchesterlieder Gustav Mahlers. Kassel: Bärenreiter 1991 (Dissertation).
- Die Tragédies lyriques Niccolò Piccinnis. Zur Synthese französischer und italienischer Oper im späten 18. Jahrhundert. Laaber: Laaber-Verlag 1999 (Habilitationsschrift).
- Kleine Geschichte der Oper. Stuttgart: Reclam 2001.
- Komponisten-Porträts. Stuttgart: Reclam 2003, 2010
- Geschichte des Liedes. Laaber: Laaber-Verl. 2007. 2nd continuous edition 2016. ISBN 978-3-89007-673-7
- Geschichte des Konzerts. Laaber: Laaber-Verlag 2015. ISBN 978-3-89007-843-4

As publisher

- with Matthias Brzoska, Susanne Fontaine, Werner Grünzweig: Töne – Farben – Formen. Über Musik und die Bildenden Künste, Festschrift für Elmar Budde zum 60. Geburtstag. Laaber: Laaber Verlag 1995. 2. Auflage 1998
- Lexikon der Oper. Komponisten – Werke – Interpreten – Sachbegriffe. 2 Vols. Laaber: Laaber Verlag 2002.
- Lexikon der Musik der Renaissance. Laaber: Laaber-Verlag 2015, and Darmstadt: Wiss. Buchgesellschaft (Lizenzausgabe) 2012.
