= Gesine Schröder =

German musicologist and music theorist

Gesine Catharina Magdalene Schröder (born 1957) is a German musicologist and music theorist. She taught music theory at the University of Music and Theatre Leipzig from 1992 and has taught at the University of Music and Performing Arts Vienna since 2012. She has lectured as a guest at universities in Europe, South America and China.

== Career ==
Born in Wilster, Holstein, Schröder took cello and piano lessons at the Hamburg Conservatory. She studied from 1976 at the Hochschule der Künste Berlin, including music pedagogy, cello, music theory, ear training, and improvisation with Christian Möllers and Hartmut Fladt, among others. At the same time, she studied German and musicology at the Free University of Berlin and Technische Universität Berlin. She earned a Ph.D. with a dissertation about Stravinsky's instrumental writing around 1920, which was awarded a Joachim-Tiburtius-Anerkennungspreis.

Schröder was a lecturer at the Hochschule der Künste from 1985 to 1991 and at the Hochschule für Musik "Hanns Eisler" in Berlin from 1991 to 1992. She has taught at the University of Music and Theatre Leipzig from 1992, in the Department of Composition and Electroacoustics (ELAK) of the Universität für Musik und darstellende Kunst Wien in Vienna since 2012, and as a part-time lecturer at the Shanghai Conservatory of Music from 2017 to 2020.

As a guest, Schröder lectured in Paris in 2002, Oslo in 2007, Poznań in 2008 and 2014, Wrocław in 2010, and at the Universidad de Chile in Santiago in 2012. She lectured in China in Beijing in 2009, 2014 and 2016, at the Chinese University of Hong Kong in 2015, and the University of Guangzhou in 2017. From 2012 to 2016 she was president of the Association of German-speaking Music Theory (gmth).

== Publications ==
- Cadenza und Concerto: Studien zu Igor Strawinskijs Instrumentalismus um 1920. Studio, Köln 1996.

As editor

- With Werner Grünzweig, Martin Supper: Schnebel 60. Wolke, Hofheim 1990.
- Tempus musicæ – tempus mundi: Untersuchungen zu Seth Calvisius. Olms, Hildesheim 2008.
- Rhythmik und Metrik (Grundlagen der Musik, vol. 6.) Laaber, Laaber 2016.
- Johann Nepomuk David. Linien und Unterbrüche (Schriften – Hochschule für Musik und Theater "Felix Mendelssohn Bartholdy" Leipzig. vol. 11.) Olms, Hildesheim 2016.
- "Wanderwege. Musiktheorien und Kompositionslehren in und aus China. ZAEB Sonderedition 2017. Bericht über drei Symposien zu dem Projekt 'The Cultural Transfer of Central European Music Theory to China'" in: Zeitschrift ästhetische Bildung. 9/2017.
- With Annegret Huber, Doris Ingrisch, Therese Kaufmann, Johannes Kretz and Tasos Zembylas: Knowing in Performing. Artistic Research in Music and the Performing Arts. transcript, Bielefeld 2021.
- With Frank Heidlberger, Christoph Wünsch, in collaboration with Stefan Beyer: Lexikon des Orchesters. Laaber, Lilienthal 2021.
