= Gregor Herzfeld =

German musicologist

Gregor Herzfeld (born in 1975) is a German musicologist.

== Life and career ==
Herzfeld studied musicology and philosophy at the Ruprecht-Karls-Universität Heidelberg and at the Scuola di Paleografia musicale from 1996 to 2001. In 2001 he obtained the Magister Artium with a thesis on the US-American composers Elliott Carter and Morton Feldman. From 2002 to 2005 he was research fellow at the Musicology Department of the University of Heidelberg. From 2005 to 2006 he worked as a research assistant at Yale University in New Haven, Connecticut, with funding from the German Academic Exchange Service. In 2006 he was awarded a doctorate at the Heidelberg University with a thesis on experimental American music. Afterwards he was visiting lecturer at the State University of Music and Performing Arts Stuttgart and received scholarships from the Paul-Sacher Foundation in Basel and the Fritz Thyssen Foundation.

From 2007 to 2015 Herzfeld was a research assistant at the Department of musicology of the Freie Universität Berlin with Albrecht Riethmüller and contributing editor of the journal Archiv für Musikwissenschaft. In 2012 Herzfeld gained his habilitation with a thesis on Edgar Allan Poe in music. In the winter semester 2012/2013 he represented the chair of historical musicology of Wolfgang Rathert at the Ludwig-Maximilians-Universität München. 2017 he habilitated at the University of Basel. From 2018 to 2022 he has been academic professor of historical musicology at the University of Vienna. Since 2022 he has been professor of musicology at the University of Regensburg.

From 2015 to 2018 Herzfeld was dramaturge of the Freiburger Barockorchester and also responsible for press and public relations.

Herzfeld publishes technical essays and book contributions on American music, especially of the 20th century, on music and philosophy, on aesthetics of music and on musical analysis of the 19th and 20th centuries. He lectured at universities and cultural institutions in Germany, Austria, Belgium, France, the Czech Republic, Switzerland and the United States.

== Publications ==
- (Editor): Johann Philipp Kirnberger: Die Kunst des reinen Satzes in der Musik. Bärenreiter, Kassel 2004, ISBN 3-7618-1725-8.
- Zeit als Prozess und Epiphanie in der experimentellen amerikanischen Musik. Charles Ives bis La Monte Young. Dissertation Heidelberg University 2006. Steiner, Stuttgart 2007, ISBN 978-3-515-09033-9.
- Poe in der Musik. Eine versatile Allianz Habilitationsschrift. Freie Universität Berlin 2012. Waxmann, Münster 2013, ISBN 978-3-8309-2923-9. Elektronische Ressource: ISBN 978-3-8309-7923-4.
- Zur Romantikrezeption in "The Black Rider" by William Burroughs, Robert Wilson und Tom Waits. In Jürgen Kühnel u. a. (edit.): Die Schaubühne in der Epoche des Freischütz. Theater und Musiktheater der Romantik, Vorträge des Salzburger Symposions 2007. Müller-Speiser, Anif/Salzburg 2009, ISBN 978-3-902537-14-0, pp. 330–343.
- with Wolfgang Jansen: Bernstein: West Side Story. Seemann Henschel, Leipzig 2015, ISBN 978-3-89487-906-8.
- with Frédéric Döhl (edit.): In Search of the "Great American Opera". Tendenzen des amerikanischen Musiktheaters. Waxmann, Münster 2016, ISBN 978-3-8309-3124-9.
