= Wolfram Steinbeck =

German musicologist

Wolfram Steinbeck (born 5 October 1945) is a German musicologist.

== Life ==
Steinbeck was born in Hagen. He studied musicology, philosophy and modern German literature at the Rheinische Friedrich-Wilhelms-Universität Bonn and the Albert-Ludwigs-Universität Freiburg. He received his doctorate in 1972 from Hans Heinrich Eggebrecht with a dissertation on The Minuet in the Instrumental Music of Joseph Haydn. In 1972, he became assistant at the musicological institute of the Christian-Albrechts-Universität zu Kiel, where he habilitated in 1979 with the work Struktur und Ähnlichkeit. Methoden automatisierter Melodienanalyse (in English: Structure and Similarity. Methods of Automated Melody Analysis). In 1988, he became Professor of Musicology at the Rheinische Friedrich-Wilhelms-Universität Bonn. From 2001 to 2011, he held the chair of Historical Musicology at the University of Cologne. He was a lecturer at the Studienstiftung des deutschen Volkes (1990–2000) and deputy chairman of the Deutsche Forschungsgemeinschaft in Bonn (1996–2004). He is corresponding member of the Akademie der Wissenschaften und der Literatur in Mainz, chairman of the Joseph Haydn-Institut in Cologne, member of the board of trustees of the Max-Reger-Institute in Karlsruhe, and co-editor of the journal Archiv für Musikwissenschaft. He wrote numerous books and articles about European musical history of composition of the 17th to the early 20th century.

== Publications ==
- Das Menuett in der Instrumentalmusik Joseph Haydns (Freiburger Schriften zur Musikwissenschaft 4), Munich 1973.
- Struktur und Ähnlichkeit. Methoden automatisierter Melodienanalyse (Kieler Schriften zur Musikwissenschaft 25), Kassel 1982.
- Anton Bruckner. Neunte Sinfonie (Meisterwerke der Musik 60), Munich 1993.
- "'Und über das Ganze eine Romantik ausgegossen'. Die Sinfonien [von Franz Schubert]", in Schubert-Handbuch, ed. Walther Dürr and Andreas Krause, Kassel and Stuttgart 1997, pp. 550–669.
- Die Symphonie im 19. und 20. Jahrhunderts, 2 parts, together with Christoph von Blumröder (Handbuch der musikalischen Gattungen 3), Laaber 2002.
