= Simon Sechter =

Austrian music teacher and composer (1788–1867)

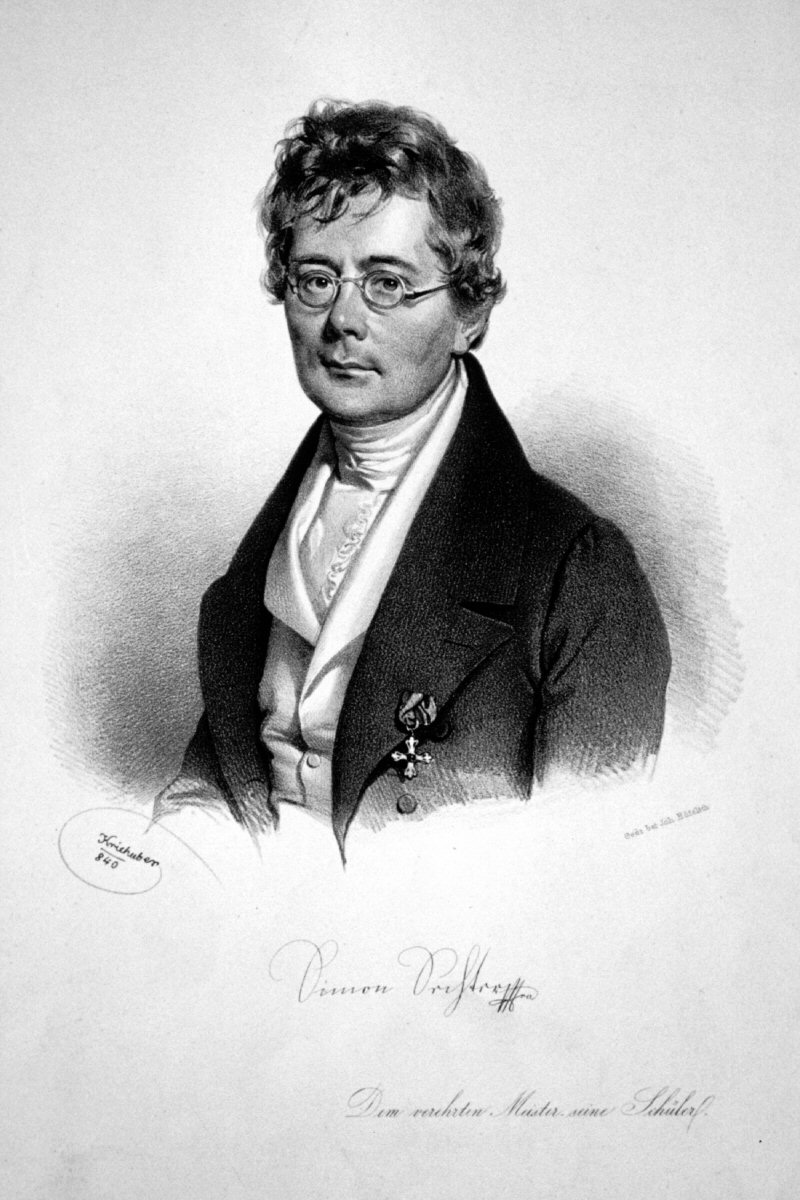
Lithograph of Sechter by Josef Kriehuber, 1840

Simon Sechter (11 October 1788 – 10 September 1867) was an Austrian music theorist, composer, conductor, and organist. He is best known as a strict music teacher, whose many students included Anton Bruckner, Sigismond Thalberg, and Henri Vieuxtemps. In 1851, he was professor of composition at the Vienna Conservatory; after Sechter's death, his student Bruckner would succeed him and continue teaching his approach to harmony and counterpoint.

A highly prolific composer, his total output numbers more than 8,000 compositions, particularly since he sought to write a fugue every day. However, Sechter's best known works are his later (post-1825) masses and oratorios. Carl Christian Müller (1831–1914) compiled and adapted Sechter's Die richtige Folge der Grundharmonien as The Correct Order of Fundamental Harmonies: A Treatise on Fundamental Basses, and their Inversions and Substitutes (Wm. A. Pond, 1871; G. Schirmer, 1898).

== Biography ==
Sechter was born on 11 October 1788 in Frymburk (Friedberg) in the Kingdom of Bohemia and moved to Vienna in 1804, succeeding Jan Václav Voříšek as court organist there in 1824. In 1810 he began teaching piano and voice at an academy for blind students. In 1828 the ailing Franz Schubert had one counterpoint lesson with him. In 1851 Sechter was appointed professor of composition at the Vienna Conservatory. His final years were spent in poverty due to his involvement in a son-in-law's bankruptcy. He was succeeded at the Conservatory by Anton Bruckner, a former student whose teaching methods were based on Sechter's.

== Teaching methods ==
Others whom Sechter taught include Henri Vieuxtemps, Franz Lachner, Eduard Marxsen (who taught Johannes Brahms piano and counterpoint), Johann Nepomuk Fuchs, Gustav Nottebohm, Anton Door, Karl Umlauf, Béla Kéler, Nina Stollewerk, Sigismond Thalberg, Adolf von Henselt, Anton de Kontski, Kornelije Stanković and Theodor Döhler.

Sechter had strict teaching methods. For instance, he forbade Bruckner to write any original compositions while studying counterpoint with him. The scholar Robert Simpson believes that "Sechter unknowingly brought about Bruckner's originality by insisting that it be suppressed until it could no longer be contained." Sechter taught Bruckner by mail from 1855 to 1861 and considered Bruckner his most dedicated pupil. Upon Bruckner's graduation, Sechter wrote a fugue dedicated to his student.

In the three-volume treatise on the principles of composition, Die Grundsätze der musikalischen Komposition, Sechter wrote a seminal work that influenced many later theorists. Sechter's ideas are derived from Jean-Philippe Rameau's theories of the fundamental bass, always diatonic even when the surface is highly chromatic; music theory historians strongly associate Sechter with the Viennese conception of fundamental bass theory. Sechter was an advocate of just intonation over well-tempered tuning.

== As composer ==
Sechter was also a composer, and in that capacity he is mostly remembered for writing about 5,000 fugues (he tried to write at least one fugue every day), but he also wrote masses and oratorios. In addition he wrote five operas: Das Testament des Magiers (1842), Ezzeline, die unglückliche Gegangene aus Deli-Katesse (1843), Ali Hitsch-Hatsch (1844), Melusine (1851), and Des Müllers Ring (?). In 1823–24, he was one of the 51 composers who composed a variation on a waltz by Anton Diabelli for Vaterländischer Künstlerverein.
