= Theodor Döhler =

German composer and pianist (1814 - 1856)

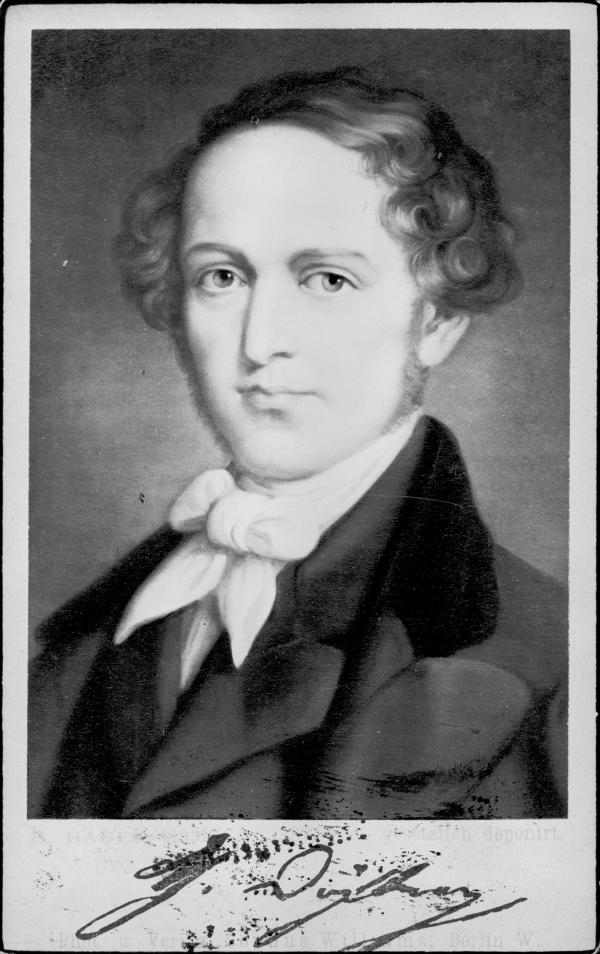
- Theodor Döhler's photo by Sophus Williams.

Background information
- Genre: Classical music
- Occupation: Pianist
- Instrument: Piano

Baron Theodor Döhler (20 April 1814 – 21 February 1856) was a German composer and a notable piano virtuoso of the Romantic period. He studied under Julius Benedict, Carl Czerny, and Simon Sechter.

== Biography ==
=== Life ===
Döhler was born in Naples, where his father (d. 1843 in Lucca) lived and worked as Kapellmeister. Recognised early on as a child prodigy, he received his first musical education in Naples from the conductor Julius Benedict, and went on to achieve widespread but brief renown across Europe as a travelling virtuoso of the Romantic period. He began performing in public concerts there at the age of 13.

In 1827, he moved to Lucca when his father received a new appointment there. From 1829 to 1834 Döhler lived in Vienna, where he studied piano under Carl Czerny. At the same time, he studied composition with Simon Sechter. He appeared on the scene in 1838, when Liszt in Vienna and Thalberg were again in Paris. In 1846, Döhler's patron, the Duke of Lucca, elevated Döhler to the rank of Baron. Now a member of the nobility, Döhler was able to marry a Russian Princess, Countess Elise Sheremeteff in that year.

Following this, Döhler gave up public performance and settled for a while in Moscow. In 1848 he moved back to Naples where he composed piano pieces and one opera, Tancreda, which was first produced in 1880, 24 years after his death, which occurred in Florence in 1856.

=== Career ===
In 1832, he was taken under the musical patronage of the Duke of Lucca. From 1834 until 1845 he toured Europe as a concert pianist, performing in Italy, France, the Netherlands, Denmark, Poland, and Russia. He was considered a very successful and fashionable piano virtuoso.

== Selected compositions ==
- Piano Concerto in A, Op. 7
- Nocturne, Op. 24
- Nocturne No. 1 in C major, Op. 25
- Tarantella, Op. 39
- Andante for piano left hand No. 33, Op. 42
- Romance sans paroles (Romance Without Words)
- Concerto pour piano et orchestre

== Discography ==
- The Romantic Piano Concerto, Vol. 61: Döhler & Dreyschock – Howard Shelley (piano/conductor), Tasmanian Symphony Orchestra. Includes: Piano Concerto in A major, Op. 7.
- Crossing Roads – Lucrezia Liberati (piano). Includes select solo piano works by Theodor Döhler.
