= Nina Stollewerk =

Austrian singer, pianist and composer

Nina Stollewerk Rosthorn (18 July 1825 - 26 January 1914) was an Austrian composer, conductor, and singer who was one of the most widely-reviewed female composers of her time, and one of the few 19th-century women to conduct an orchestra.

Stollewerk was born in Vienna, where she studied music with Simon Sechter. She married Hugo von Rosthorn, the head of the Emperor Ferdinand's Northern Railway, but published most of her music under the name Nina Stollewerk.

Stollewerk composed her first lieder in 1841, when she was 16 years old. Her music was performed by the well-known singer Jenny Lind. In 1849, she announced her plans to create a music school for girls in Vienna.

Stollewerk was mentioned in at least 14 articles or reviews in the Allgemeine Wiener, frequently by critic Ferdinand Peter Graf von Laurencin d’Armond (also known by the pseudonym “Philokales”). Unusually for a woman at that time, Stollewerk conducted a performance of her orchestral works at the Odeon concert hall in Munich in 1851. Her works were also performed in Vienna’s Musikverein.

Stollewerk’s music was published by Anton Diabelli, Glöggl, and Witzendorf.

== Compositions ==
=== Chamber ===
- Romanesca (bass viol)

=== Orchestra ===
- Mary Stuart Overture
- Mass
- Offertory
- Two symphonies

=== Vocal ===
- “Elisa’s Erstes Begegnen” (text by Ferdinand Sauter)
- “Grablied” (text by Johann Nepomuk Johann Vogl)
- Gute Nacht (male chorus and TTBB solo quartet)
- “Liebchen wo Bist Du?” (text by Joseph David)
- “Linde Durch die Linde”
- “Matrosenlied,” opus 6 no. 1 (text by Wilhelm Christoph Leonhard Gerhard)
- Psalm (for six voices)
- “Uberall mit Dir”
- “Wunsch und Gruss,” opus 6
- “Zwei Gedichte,” opus 5 (text by Siegfried Kapper)

== See also ==
- Hear Matrosenlied by Nina Stollewerk.
