= Otto Nicolai =

19th-century German composer and conductor

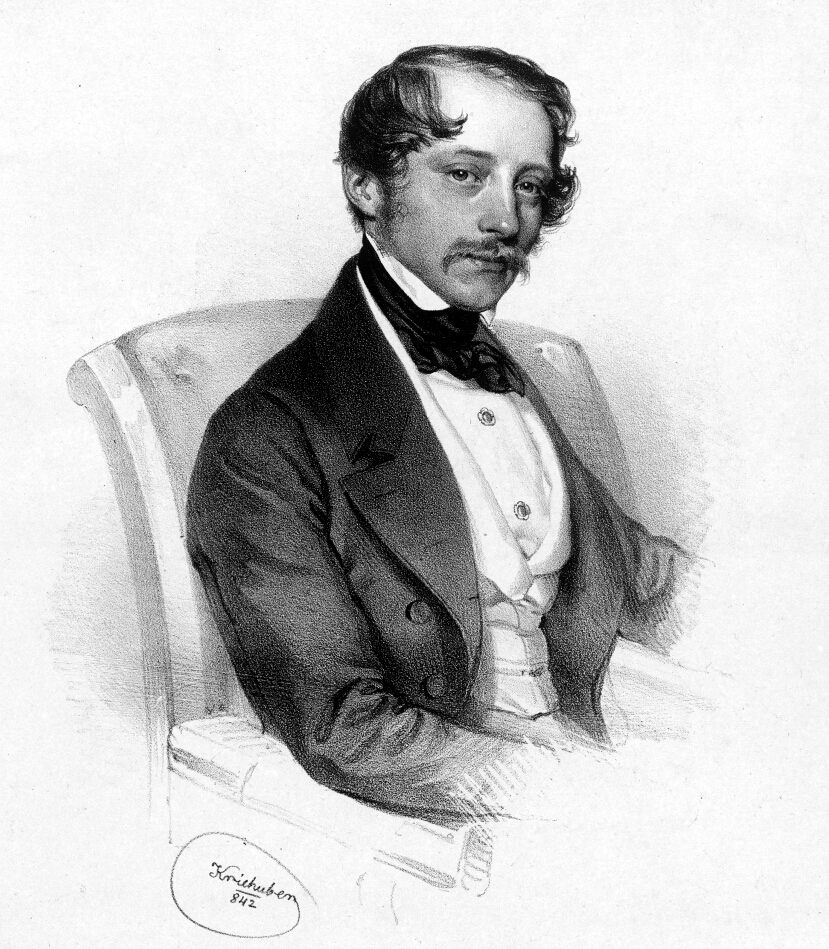
Otto Nicolai in 1842

Carl Otto Ehrenfried Nicolai (9 June 1810 – 11 May 1849) was a German composer, conductor, and one of the founders of the Vienna Philharmonic. Nicolai is best known for his operatic version of Shakespeare's comedy The Merry Wives of Windsor as Die lustigen Weiber von Windsor. In addition to five operas, Nicolai composed lieder, works for orchestra, chorus, ensemble, and solo instruments.

== Biography ==
Nicolai, a child prodigy, was born in Königsberg, Prussia. He received his first musical education from his father, Carl Ernst Daniel Nicolai, who was also a composer and musical director. During his childhood his parents divorced, and while still a youth, early in June 1826, Nicolai ran away from his parents' "loveless" home, taking refuge in Stargard with a senior legal official called August Adler who treated the musical prodigy like a son and, when Nicolai was seventeen, sent him to Berlin to study with Carl Friedrich Zelter.

After initial successes in Germany, including his first symphony (1831) and public concerts, he became musician to the Prussian embassy in Rome. When Verdi declined the libretto of Il proscritto by the proprietors of La Scala in Milan, it was offered instead to Nicolai. Later, Nicolai refused a libretto by the same author, and it went to Verdi, whose Nabucco was his first early success. All of Nicolai's operas were originally written in Italian, the sole exception being his last and best known opera, The Merry Wives of Windsor, written in German. At one time he was even more popular in Italy than Verdi.

During the early 1840s, Nicolai established himself as a major figure in the concert life of Vienna. In 1844 he was offered the position, vacated by Felix Mendelssohn, of Kapellmeister at the Berlin Cathedral; but he did not reestablish himself in Berlin until the last year of his life.

On 11 May 1849, two months after the premiere of The Merry Wives of Windsor, and only two days after his appointment as Hofkapellmeister at the Berlin Staatsoper, he collapsed and died from a stroke. On the same day of his death, he was elected a member of the Royal Prussian Academy of Arts.

Nicolai was portrayed by Hans Nielsen in the 1940 film Falstaff in Vienna.

== Works ==
=== Operas ===
Title	Genre	Subdivisions	Libretto	Composition	Première date	Place, theatre
La figlia abbandonata				1837	unfinished	
Rosmonda d'Inghilterra (given at the first performance as: Enrico II)	melodramma serio	2 acts	Felice Romani	1837–1838	26 November 1839	Trieste, Teatro Grande
Il templario	melodramma	3 acts	Girolamo Maria Marini, after Walter Scott	1839–1840	11 February 1840	Turin, Teatro Regio
Gildippe ed Odoardo	melodramma	3 acts	Temistocle Solera	1840	26 December 1840	Genoa
Il proscritto		3 acts	Gaetano Rossi	1841	13 March 1841	Milan, La Scala
Die Heimkehr des Verbannten (revision of Il proscritto)	tragische Oper	3 acts	Siegfried Kapper	1843	3 February 1844	Vienna, Theater am Kärntnertor
Der Tempelritter (revision of Il templario)		3 acts	Siegfried Kapper	1845	20 December 1845	Vienna, Theater am Kärntnertor
Die lustigen Weiber von Windsor	komisch-phantastische Oper	3 acts	Salomon Hermann Mosenthal, after William Shakespeare, The Merry Wives of Windsor	1845–1846	9 March 1849	Berlin, Hofoper

=== Other ===
- Six four-part unaccompanied lieder, Op. 6
- Variazioni concertanti su motivi favoriti dell'opera La sonnambula di Bellini, Op. 26, for soprano, horn and piano (or cello or clarinet) (republished in 2000 by edition mf)
- Ecclesiastical Festival Overture on the chorale "Ein feste Burg ist unser Gott", Op. 31
- Pater noster, Op. 33, for two mixed choirs (SATB/SATB) a cappella with soloists (SATB/SATB). Published by Schott Music in 1999.
- Der dritte Psalm (Psalm 3) for alto solo. (Manuscript at Library of Congress.)
- Six sonatas for two horns: from the Handel Knot-Farquharson Cousins ms (re(?)published by Edition Kunzelmann in 1977.)
- Mass in D major (1832/1845). (Recorded on the label Koch Schwann in 1981, subsequently reissued on compact disc. Published by Augsburg : A. Böhm in 1986.)
- Te Deum (1832); Psalm 97, "Der Herr ist König"; Psalm 31, "Herr, auf Dich traue ich"; "Ehre sei Gott in der Höhe" (psalm and liturgical settings recorded also on Koch Schwann. Te Deum was also recorded on Deutsche Grammophon Gesellschaft LPM 39,170 in 1966.) Psalms 31 & 97 published by Bote & Bock of Berlin in 1977.
- Symphony No. 1 in C minor (1831)
- Symphony No. 2 in D major (1835, rev. 1845). Entered into the Vienna Gesellschaft der Musikfreunde competition of 1835; gained third prize after Franz Lachner's 5th Symphony in C minor, "Passionata", amid some controversy.
- Weihnachtsouverture (Christmas overture) (1833); for orchestra, organ and mixed choir, based on the choral “Von Himmel hoch, da komm’ ich her”.
- Concertino for Trumpet and Orchestra in Eb major (1835)

=== Songs and duets ===
- Wenn sanft des Abends, Op. 2a
- Der Schäfer im Mai / Männersinn, Op. 3
- Abschied, Op. 13
- Auf ewig dein, Op. 14
- Wie der Tag mir schleicht / Willkommen du Gottes Sonne / Die Schwalbe, Op. 15
- Lebewohl / An die Entfernte / Randino / Das treue Mädchen, Op. 16
- Schlafendes Herzenssöhnchen, Op. 19
- Rastlose Liebe, Op. 23
- Il duolo d'amore / Se tranquillo a te d'accanto / Il desiderio al lido, Op. 24
- Die Träne, Op. 30
- Die Beruhigung / Der getreue Bub / Stürm, stürm, du Winterwind, Op. 34
- Der Kuckuck / Flohjammer / Du bist zu klein, mein Hänselein, Op. 35
- Herbstlied, Op. 37

=== Works for piano ===
- Six danses brillantes
- Rondo capriccioso
- Sonata in D minor, Op. 27
- Mondwalzer
- Etude Adieu à Liszt, Op. 28
- 3 Etudes, Op. 40
