= Albrecht Riethmüller =

German musicologist

Albrecht Riethmüller (born 21 January 1947) is a German musicologist.

== Life ==
Born in 1947 in Stuttgart, Riethmüller studied musicology, philosophy and modern German literature at the Albert-Ludwigs-Universität Freiburg, where he received his doctorate in 1974 from Hans Heinrich Eggebrecht with the dissertation Die Musik als Abbild der Realität, and habilitated in 1984 with his study on Ferruccio Busoni's Poetik. He first took a guest professorship at the University of Illinois at Urbana–Champaign (1983), and held substitute professorships at the universities of Heidelberg, (1984/85) and Frankfurt (1986). Riethmüller held additional teaching positions at the Hochschule für Musik Freiburg (1985–87) and at the Martin Luther University of Halle-Wittenberg (1994).

In 1986 he was appointed Professor of musicology at the Goethe University Frankfurt, succeeding Ludwig Finscher, and in 1992 he was appointed Professor at the Freie Universität Berlin, succeeding Rudolf Stephan. Since 1991 he has been a member of the Akademie der Wissenschaften und der Literatur.

In 1999 he received the John G. Diefenbaker Award from the Canada Council for the Arts in Ottawa, and since 2002 he has been an Affiliated Faculty Member of the Canadian Centre for German and European Studies at York University in Toronto. He participated in the academic self-administration and scientific organization as Dean and Vice Dean of the Department of Classical Philology and Art Studies at the Goethe University Frankfurt (1988-1991), the Department of Classical Studies at the Freie Universität Berlin (1995-1999), the Deutsche Forschungsgemeinschaft in Bonn (1992-2000), the Austrian Science Fund in Vienna (1993-2004), and the Chair of the Senate Commission for Research and Young Academics at the Freie Universität Berlin (1997-1999). He was a lecturer of the Studienstiftung des deutschen Volkes (1990-2004) and has been chairman of the Kommission für Musikwissenschaft der Akademie der Wissenschaften und der Literatur Mainz since 1991, member of the Committee for Musicological Editions of the Union of the German Academies of Sciences and Humanities (since 1991) and of the Scientific Advisory Board of the Beethoven House (since 2001). Since 2004 he represents the Union of German Academies of Sciences at ALLEA (All European Academies) in Amsterdam.

Since 2000 Riethmüller is editor of the journal Archiv für Musikwissenschaft including supplements. He currently heads academy research centers and musicological projects in Collaborative Research Centers of the Deutsche Forschungsgemeinschaft and is a member of the International Research Training Group InterArt and Principal Investigator of the Cluster Languages of Emotion at the Freie Universität Berlin.

== Publications ==
Monographs

- Die Musik als Abbild der Realität. Zur dialektischen Widerspiegelungstheorie in der Ästhetik (Archiv für Musikwissenschaft. 15). Steiner, Wiesbaden 1976, ISBN 3-515-02153-1.
- Ferruccio Busonis Poetik (Neue Studien zur Musikwissenschaft. 4). Schott, Mainz amoing others 1988, ISBN 3-7957-1723-X (Zugleich: Freiburg (Breisgau), Universität, Habilitations-Schrift, 1984).
- Die Walhalla und ihre Musiker. Laaber-Verlag, Laaber 1993, ISBN 3-89007-297-6.
- Gedichte über Musik. Quellen ästhetischer Einsicht (Spektrum der Musik. 4). Laaber-Verlag, Laaber 1996, ISBN 3-89007-200-3.
- Annäherung an Musik. Studien und Essays. Steiner, Stuttgart 2007, ISBN 978-3-515-08957-9.

Editorships

- with Frieder Zaminer: Die Musik des Altertums (Neues Handbuch der Musikwissenschaft. Bd. 1). Laaber-Verlag, Laaber 1989, ISBN 3-89007-031-0.
- with Ludwig Finscher: Johann Strauß. Zwischen Kunstanspruch und Volksvergnügen. Wissenschaftliche Buchgesellschaft, Darmstadt 1995, ISBN 3-534-12660-2.
- with Carl Dahlhaus and Alexander L. Ringer: Beethoven. Interpretationen seiner Werke. 2 volumes. Laaber-Verlag, Laaber 1994, ISBN 3-89007-259-3 (several editions).
- Sprache und Musik. Perspektiven einer Beziehung (Spektrum der Musik. 5). Laaber-Verlag, Laaber 1999, ISBN 3-89007-320-4.
- Bruckner-Probleme. Internationales Kolloquium 7.–9. Oktober 1996 in Berlin (Beihefte zum Archiv für Musikwissenschaft. 45). Steiner, Stuttgart 1999, ISBN 3-515-07496-1.
- Brecht und seine Komponisten (Spektrum der Musik. 6). Laaber-Verlag, Laaber 2000, ISBN 3-89007-501-0.
- with Michael Hans Kater: Music and Nazism. Art under Tyranny, 1933–1945. Laaber-Verlag, Laaber 2003, ISBN 3-89007-516-9 (2nd edition, id. 2004).
- with Hyesu Shin: Busoni in Berlin. Facetten eines kosmopolitischen Komponisten. Steiner, Stuttgart 2004, ISBN 3-515-08603-X.
- with Michael Beiche: Musik – Zu Begriff und Konzepten. Berliner Symposium zum Andenken an Hans Heinrich Eggebrecht. Steiner, Stuttgart 2004, ISBN 3-515-08848-2.
- Geschichte der Musik im 20. Jahrhundert. 1925–1945 (Handbuch der Musik im 20. Jahrhundert. vol. 2). Laaber-Verlag, Laaber 2006, ISBN 3-89007-422-7.
- Deutsche Leitkultur Musik? Zur Musikgeschichte nach dem Holocaust. Steiner, Stuttgart 2006, ISBN 3-515-08974-8.
- with Michael Custodis: Georg Kreisler. Grenzgänger. Sieben Beiträge (Rombach Wissenschaften. 169). Rombach, Freiburg (Breisgau) among others 2009 ISBN 978-3-7930-9554-5.
