= Uwe Stickert =

German opera singer (born 1976)

- Born: 1976 (age 48–49); Sonneberg, East Germany
- Occupation: Opera tenor

Uwe Stickert (born in Sonneberg, East Germany) is a German opera singer (tenor). After his education at the Musik-Gymnasium Belvedere and the Hochschule für Musik Franz Liszt, Weimar, he started with lyric tenor repertory such as Tamino in The Magic Flute and Belmont in Die Entführung aus dem Serail at the Theater Heidelberg and the Nationaltheater Weimar.

== Career ==
Since 2008 he has sung many roles by Mozart such as Tito in La clemenza di Tito, Don Ottavio in Don Giovanni and Ferrando in Così fan tutte, but has widened his range to the French grand opera. He was mentioned by Opernwelt as Singer of the Year for his Raoul de Nangis in Meyerbeer's Les Huguenots in 2014. He has appeared as Arnold in Guillaume Tell and as Leopold in La Juive by Halévy. He made his debut at Opéra de Nice as Raoul in Les Huguenots in 2016

== Prizes ==
- 2008: Debut 3rd prize

== Recordings ==
- Anna-Amalia von Sachsen-Weimar, Erwin und Elmire, Deutsche Schallplatten, 2007
- Franz Liszt, Works for Violin, Piano and Voice, Hänssler, 2011
- Böhmische Weihnacht, Werke u.a. von Vejvanowsky mit Ludwig Güttler, Edel Classics, 2014
