= Archiv für Musikwissenschaft =

The Archiv für Musikwissenschaft is a quarterly German-English-speaking trade magazine devoted to music history and historical musicology, which publishes articles by well-known academics and young scholars.

It was founded in 1918 as the successor of the Sammelbände der Internationalen Musikgesellschaft by Max Seiffert, Johannes Wolf and Max Schneider, who were also the first editors. It was under the patronage of the Fürstliches Institut für musikwissenschaftliche Forschung zu Bückeburg. The first two volumes 1918/1919 and 1919/1920 were published by Breitkopf & Härtel, then the volumes 1921 to 1926 by Kistner & Siegel.

With the 8th volume the publication of the journal was stopped in 1927, but resumed in 1952 with the 9th volume. Publisher of the quarterly was Wilibald Gurlitt (in connection with Heinrich Besseler, Walter Gerstenberg and Arnold Schmitz), who assigned the editorship to Hans Heinrich Eggebrecht. With the 19th/20th volume 1962/1963 the Archive for Musicology was taken over by the Franz Steiner Verlag and the publication to Eggebrecht, who kept it together with the editor until the 56th volume (1999). Albrecht Riethmüller has been publishing the journal since 2000, the editors are Frank Hentschel (2000-2006), Gregor Herzfeld (2007-2014) and Andreas Domann (since 2015).

Since 1966 the journal has been supplemented by the book series Supplements to the Archive for Musicology. It contains musicological monographs, in particular dissertations and habilitation thesis. So far (2018) more than 80 volumes have been published.

The journal holds the status of refereed journal.

As of 2018, the editors were:

- Albrecht Riethmüller, Freie Universität Berlin, responsible publisher, in collaboration with:
- Ludwig Finscher, Wolfenbüttel
- Frank Hentschel,
- Hans-Joachim Hinrichsen, University of Zürich
- Birgit Lodes, University of Vienna
- Anne C. Shreffler,
- Wolfram Steinbeck, University of Cologne
