= Siegfried Gumbel =

German Jewish attorney and politician

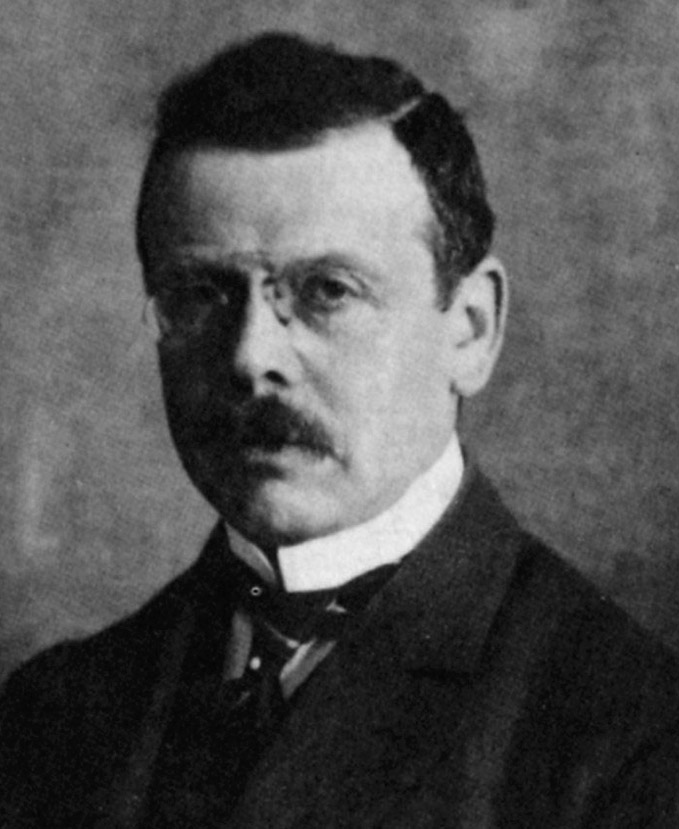
Siegfried Gumbel in 1902

Siegfried Gumbel (September 22, 1874 in Heilbronn – January 27, 1942 in Dachau) was an attorney, politician (DDP), and President of the Jewish Community of Württemberg, Stuttgart since 1933.

== Early life ==
Gumbel was born into a well-to-do Jewish family of bankers. As an adult, he was elected President of the Jewish Community of Württemberg, Stuttgart in 1933. He was also President of the B'nai B'rith of Heilbronn, and as one of the leaders of the Jewish community, he was especially concerned with the problem of anti-semitism in Germany. In the Jewish Community of Württemberg he was working to promote the migration.

== Death ==
He decidedly opposed the antisemitism and became the first victim of the Kristallnacht, when he was taken to the concentration camps of Welzheim and Dachau. He was assassinated on January 27, 1942.

== Memorial street ==
In 1961, 19 years after his assassination, Gumbel's violent death again became the subject of public discussion when a street in Heilbronn was named after him.

== Literature ==
- Hans Franke, Geschichte und Schicksal der Juden in Heilbronn, Heilbronn (Stadtarchiv), 1963, S. 201ff.
- Dr. Wolfram Angerbauer, Katalog - Museum zur Geschichte der Juden in Kreis und Stadt Heilbronn, unter Mitarbeit des Vorstandes des Vereins zur Erhaltung der Synagoge Affaltrach.
- Horst Göppinger: Juristen jüdischer Abstammung im "Dritten Reich", München (Beck) 1990, S. 245
