= Siegfried Kapper =

Bohemian-born Austrian Jewish writer

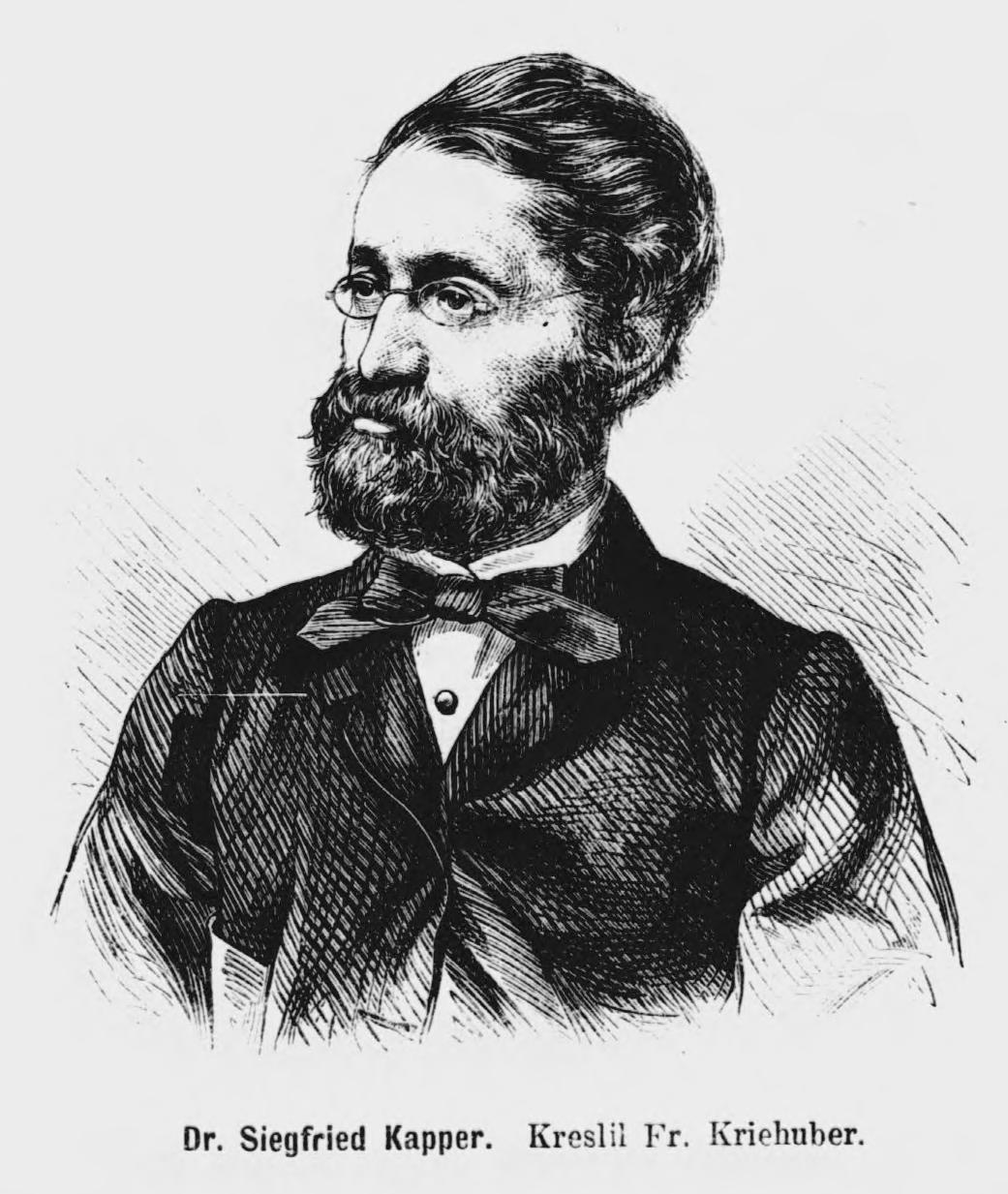
Siegfried Kapper (1870), by Friedrich Kriehuber

Siegfried Kapper was the literary pseudonym of Isaac Salomon Kapper (21 March 1821, Smíchov – 7 June 1879, Prague), a Bohemian-born Austrian writer of Jewish origin. Born in Smichow, Kapper studied medicine at Prague University, later completing a Ph.D. at the University of Vienna. Kapper wrote excellent fairy tales and poems, and was one of the leading figures of Czech-Jewish assimilation. Kapper wrote in both German and Czech. He translated Mácha's Máj into German for the first time (1844). Austrian composer Nina Stollewerk used Kapper's text for her composition "Zwei Gedichte," opus 5.

After his death, the Kapper-Society was founded; its aim was Czech-Jewish assimilation and opposition to Zionism and German-Jewish assimilation.

== Selected works ==
- "Das Böhmerland" (1865)
- "Die Handschriften Altböhmischer Poesien" (1859)
- "Die Böhmischen Bäder" (1857)
- "Fürst Lazar" (1853)
- "Falk" (1853)
- "Südslavische Wanderungen" (1853)
- "Die Gesänge der Serben" (1852 – in two parts)
- "Lazar der Serbenzar" (1851). Kapper had a Serbian predecessor in the person of Joksim Nović-Otočanin who published his book on the same theme at Novi Sad (Neusatz) in 1847.
- "Befreite Lieder dem Jungen Oesterreich" (1848)
- "České Listy" (1846)
- "Slavische Melodien" (1844)

== English edition ==
- Tales of the Prague Ghetto. Prague: Karolinum Press (2022). ISBN 9788024649450. The stories Kapper wrote about the Jews of Prague (collected posthumously as Prager Ghettosagen, 1896).
