= Walter Vielhauer =

German politician (1909–1986)

Walter Vielhauer (German: [ˈvaltɐ ˈfiːlhaʊɐ]; April 1, 1909 in Reutlingen - April 19, 1986 in Heilbronn) was a communist and anti-fascist of Heilbronn who was held captive by Nazi Germany before and during World War II.

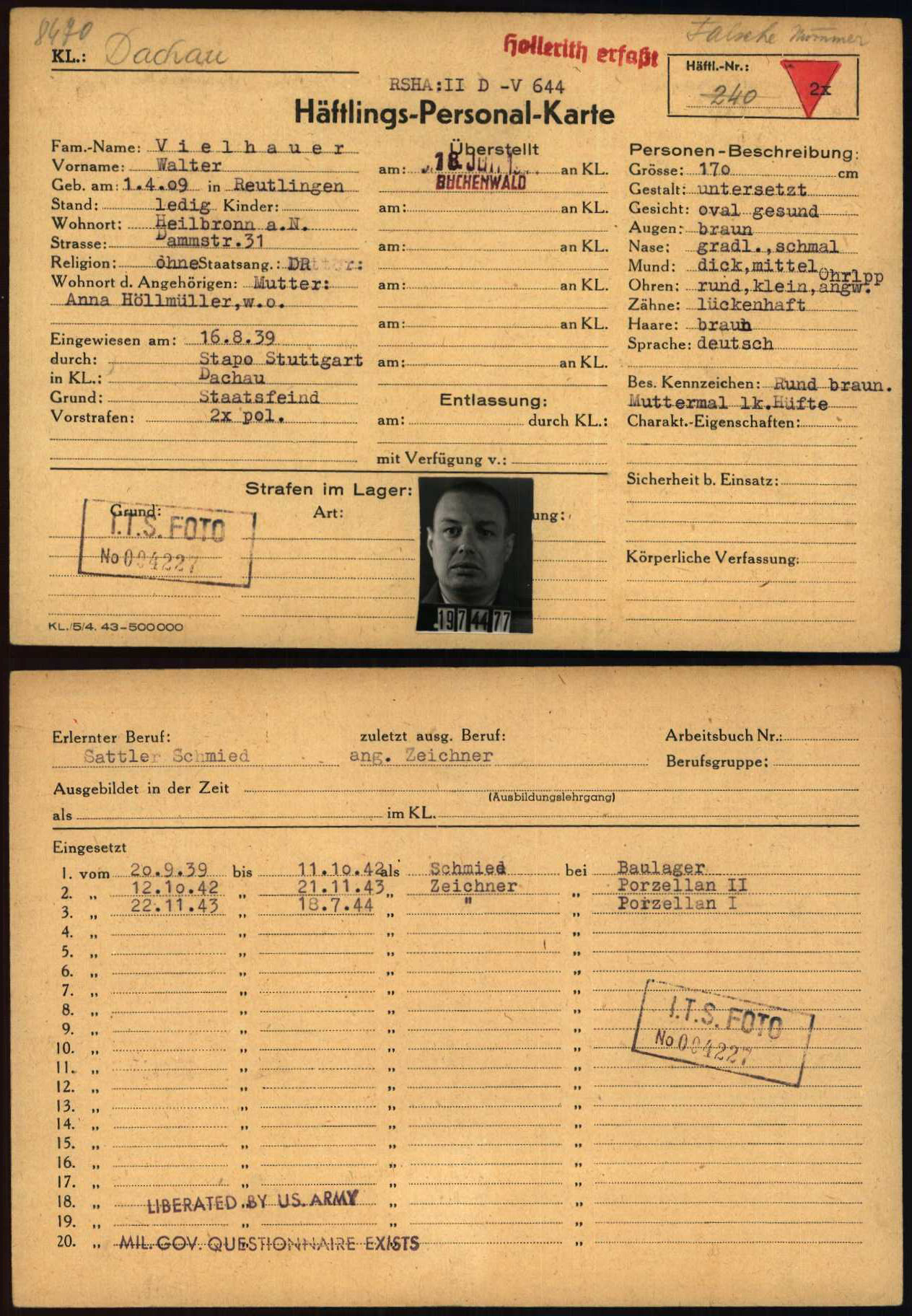
Registration card of Walter Vielhauer as a prisoner at Dachau Nazi Concentration Camp, with later "mugshot" (taken at Buchenwald)

He was first arrested in March 1933 and was held several weeks at the new concentration camp Heuberg. After his release, he continued his struggle against fascism and in autumn of 1933, he was arrested again. He was condemned to five and a half years in penitentiary, which he had to spend in solitary confinement. After serving his sentence, he was sent to various concentration camps, Welzheim, Dachau, Mauthausen and Buchenwald, where he was active with the Resistance activities there.

In June 1945, he was deployed by the United States Army as assistant of the lord mayor and was responsible for social affairs in Heilbronn until 1948.

== Sources ==
- Hitler als Hoffnungsträger. In: Heilbronn im nationalsozialistischen Deutschland 1933–1945 (in German)
- Buchenwald - Ein Konzentrationslager. Bericht der ehemaligen KZ-Häftlinge Emil Carlebach, Paul Grünewald, Helmut Röder, Willy Schmidt, Walter Vielhauer. ISBN 3-87682-786-8 (in German)
- Trau! Schau! Wem? Dokumente zur Geschichte der Arbeiterbewegung im Raum Heilbronn/Neckarsulm 1844–1949. ISBN 3-929348-09-8 (in German)
- Opfer von Terror und Verfolgung: Walter Vielhauer (1909–1986) (in German)
