= Susanne Fontaine =

German musicologist (born 1961)

Susanne Fontaine (born 31 January 1961) is a German musicologist and university teacher.

== Life ==
Born in Merzig/Saarland, Fontaine studied musicology, Germanistic and philosophy from 1980 until 1986 at the Universität des Saarlandes in Saarbrücken, School music at the Universität der Künste Berlin as well as musicology and Germanistic at the Technische Universität Berlin and the Freie Universität Berlin.

From 1992 to 1998 Fontaine was a research assistant at the Hochschule der Künste; in 1999 she received a habilitation scholarship from the Deutsche Forschungsgemeinschaft on the topic The figure of Maria Magdalena in the music of the 17th and 18th century. In 2000 and 2001 she held the professorship for musicology at the State University of Music and Performing Arts Stuttgart. In the winter semester 2002/03 Fontaine was a lecturer at the musicology department of the Ruprecht-Karls-University Heidelberg. In 2003 she was appointed professor at the University of Potsdam and in 2004 she moved to the Berlin University of the Arts.

Fontaine's research focuses on religious music of the 17th century, the early 20th century and interdisciplinary issues.

Fontaine is chairwoman of the Berlin chapter of the German University Association.

== Publications ==
=== Book ===
- Busoni's Doktor Faust und die Ästhetik des Wunderbaren. Kassel 1998 (Dissertation. University of Hamburg, 1997).

=== Essays ===
- Leo Kestenberg as Musikpolitiker. In Wolfgang Rathert, Giselher Schubert (edits.): Musikkultur in der Weimar Republic. Mainz 2001, pp. 82–100.
- „Erziehung zur Menschlichkeit durch Musik“. Ein Brief von Leo Kestenberg an Georg Schünemann. In Diskussion Musikpädagogik. Volume 9, 2001, pp. 90–97.
- L’escalier du temps. Zeitgestaltung im Liedschaffen Messiaen's. In Ariane Jeßulat, Andreas Ickstadt, Martin Ullrich (edits.): Zwischen Komposition und Hermeneutik. Festschrift für Hartmut Fladt. Würzburg 2005, pp. 335–346.
- Liebreiz statt Zerknirschung. Die Figur der Magdalene in Handel's La Resurrezione. In the Händel-Jahrbuch. Volume 52, 2006, pp. 215–223.
- Zwischen Aufführungskritik und ästhetischer Reflexion: Zu den Artikeln über Musik in Heine's Lutezia. In Arnold Pistiak, Julia Rintz (edits.): Zu Heinrich Heines Spätwerk „Lutezia“. Kunstcharakter und europäischer Kontext. Berlin 2007, pp. 165–174.
