= Werner Grünzweig =

Werner Grünzweig (born 1959) is an Austrian musicologist and archivist.

== Life ==
Born in Graz, Grünzweig first studied piano at the University of Music and Performing Arts Graz, and from 1984 musicology and American studies at the Freie Universität Berlin. He graduated with an M.A. in 1989. In 1995 he was awarded the Dr. phil. with the work Ahnung und Wissen, Geist und Form : Alban Berg als Musikschriftsteller und Analytiker der Musik Arnold Schönbergs (published 2000 at the Universal Edition Vienna). From 1994 until 2025 Grünzweig has been head of the music archive of the Academy of Arts, Berlin.

== Selected publications ==
- Werner Grünzweig, Gesine Schröder, Martin Supper (editors): Schnebel 60. Wolke, Hofheim 1990, ISBN 3-923997-36-1.
- Harald Kaufmann: Von innen und außen. Schriften über Musik, Musikleben und Ästhetik. Ed. by Werner Grünzweig and Gottfried Krieger. Wolke, Hofheim 1993. ISBN 3-923997-52-3
- Werner Grünzweig: Ahnung und Wissen, Geist und Form. Alban Berg als Musikschriftsteller und Analytiker der Musik Arnold Schönbergs. Wien, Universal Edition 2000; 320 pages. ISBN 3-7024-0256-X
- Werner Grünzweig, Jörn Peter Hiekel, Anouk Jeschke (eds.): Hans Zender : vielstimmig in sich. Wolke, Hofheim 2008; 118 pages. ISBN 978-3-936000-25-2
