= Peter Förtig =

German composer (1934–2024)

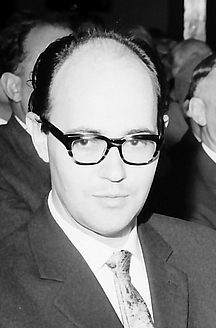
Förtig in 1966

Peter Förtig (15 March 1934 – 12 April 2024) was a German composer and music theorist.

== Life and career ==
Born in Pforzheim, Förtig received his first piano lessons at the age of eight with Hedwig Fuchs and from the age of 11 onwards he received lessons in piano and music theory from Georg Mantel and Heinrich Casimir in Karlsruhe. He made his first public appearances at the age of ten, during which time he wrote his first compositions. 1951 saw the premiere of a composition for the Southwest German Chamber Orchestra Pforzheim; in the same concert he appeared as soloist in Beethoven's first piano concerto in C major.

After graduating from the Reuchlin Gymnasium in Pforzheim, he studied from 1953 to 1955 at the Musikhochschule Karlsruhe, where Josef Schelb was his piano and composition teacher. Afterwards he worked as a freelance pianist for two years. In 1957 he continued his studies at the Freiburg Music Academy, where Carl Seemann (piano) and Wolfgang Fortner (composition) were his teachers.

In 1961 he became a lecturer, later a docent and from 1969 until his retirement professor for music theory at the University of Music in Freiburg. There he largely restructured the teaching of theory.

From 1965 to 1967 he completed supplementary composition studies with Klaus Huber at the Basel Academy of Music. In 1966 Förtig received the Reinhold-Schneider-Preis (Promotion Prize), Culture Prize of the City of Freiburg, in Breisgau.

Förtig also received the composition prize for an organ work in Nuremberg.

His oeuvre, which now comprises 105 works, includes song cycles with piano or ensemble, choral music with and without instrumental accompaniment, as well as large-scale works for orchestra, choir and soloists, including concertos, and organ music.

Förtig died on 12 April 2024, at the age of 90.

== Awards ==
- 1966: Reinhold-Schneider-Preis of the city of Freiburg for Music
- 1969: Prize winner for the composition "Stationes" at the organ composition competition of the Internationale Orgelwoche Nürnberg.

== Compositions ==
- Ave verum Corpus, für sechs- bis achtstimmigen gemischten Chor und acht Blasinstrumente.
- Und Setze meine bogen in die Wolken : Zyklus für Orgel; Nunc dimittis.
- Handbuch Klinische Studien : ein Ratgeber für Ärzte und Studienschwestern (Study nurses); mit 5 Tabellen.
- Musica : scientia et ars : eine Festgabe für Peter Förtig zum 60. Geburtstag.
- List of 11 compositions in the German National Library.
