= Friedhelm Döhl =

German composer and professor (1936–2018)

Friedhelm Döhl (7 July 1936 – 25 September 2018) was a German composer and professor of music.

Döhl studied composition with Wolfgang Fortner and piano with Carl Seemann at the Hochschule für Musik Freiburg, and also musicology, German philology, art history, and philosophy concurrently at the Universities of Freiburg and Göttingen. In 1966 he wrote his doctoral dissertation on Anton Webern.

From 1964 to 1967 he was a lecturer at the Robert Schumann Conservatory in Düsseldorf. There he founded the Studio for New Music. From 1969 to 1974 he was a professor at the Musicology Institute of the Free University of Berlin, where he was a member of New Music Berlin. In 1974 he was appointed director of the Music Academy of Basel, and worked there until 1982. This period saw the founding of the studios there for electronic music, non-European music, music and theater. In the years from 1980 to 1983 he was president of the German section of the International Society for Contemporary Music. During his tenure came the founding of the Ensemble Modern.

Since 1982 he has been professor of composition at the Musikhochschule in Lübeck, and he became its director in 1991. At Lübeck he introduced a new series of events (Forum of Young Composers, New Music Workshop). In 1992, he initiated the Lübeck Brahms Festival. Since 1986 he has been a member of the Free Academy of Arts in Hamburg. He was artistic director for the concert series Musica Viva / Encounters, in Reinbek, from 1986 to 1988, and served in a similar capacity for the 1987 NDR Festival 'The New Factory,' in Lübeck.

He has composed works for solo instruments, chamber groups, voice, orchestra, and live electronics. Paul Sacher performed "Conductus" für vier Schlagzeuger (1980) with Das Basler Schlagzeug-Ensemble im Stadttheater Basel (13. September 1981) (CD Paul Sacher und die Neue Musik, Ars Musici)
