= Hildener Jazztage =

Music festival

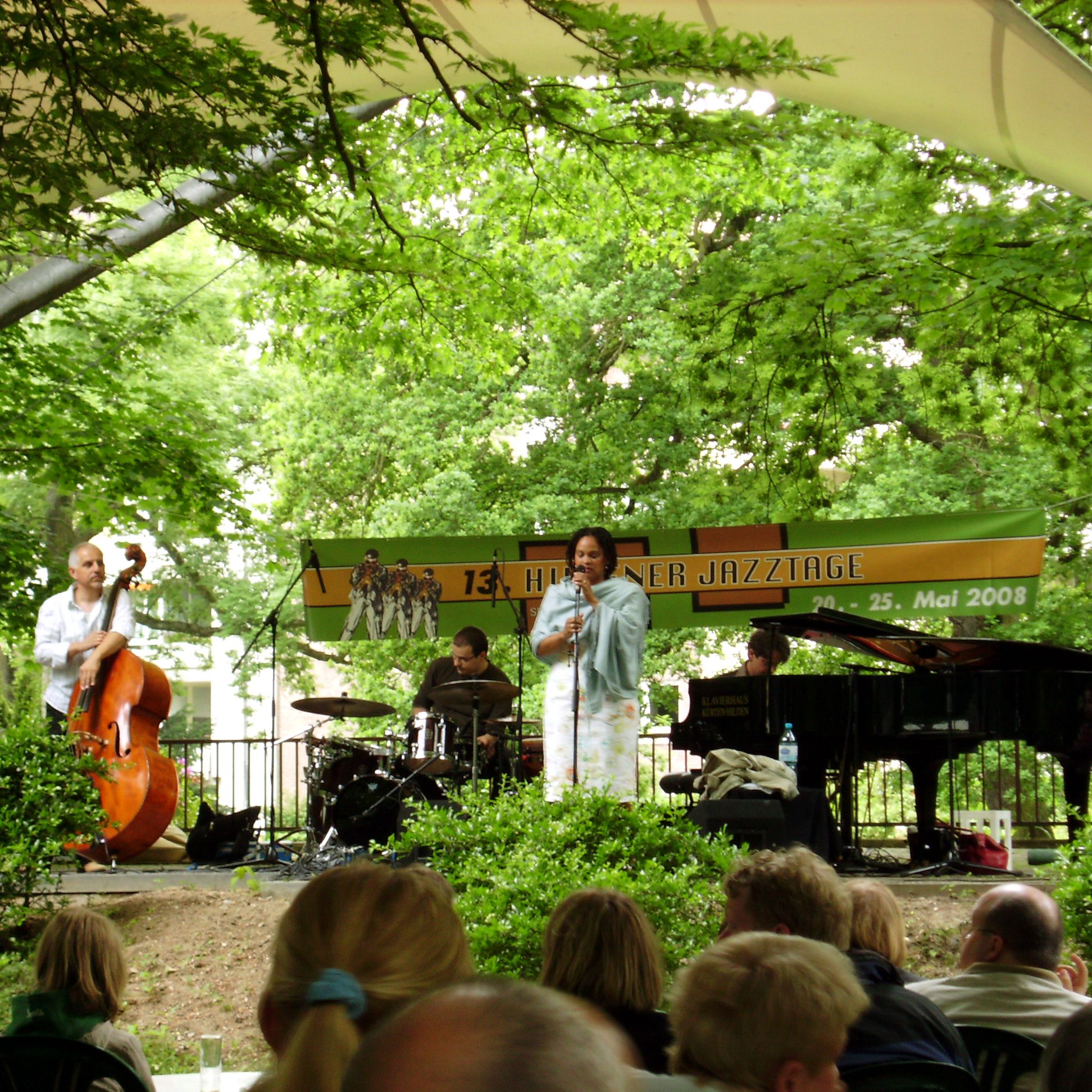
The Cécile Verny Quartet at Hildener Jazztage 2008

Hildener Jazztage is a jazz festival in Hilden, Germany. It is held in the early summer for six days and attracts up to 6000 people. The 24th Hilden Jazztage will take place from 18 to 23 June 2019. Over 2000 jazz musicians turn out at the event which is sponsored by the local council, Sparkasse HRV, Stadtmarketing GmbH, and Stiftung Sport und Kultur.
