= Komma =

Komma may refer to:

- the Greek comma, when distinguishing it or its historical forms from the Latin comma
- Komma (alga), a genus of algae
- Karl Komma (1913-2012) German composer
