= Franz Philipp =

German church musician and composer (1890–1972)

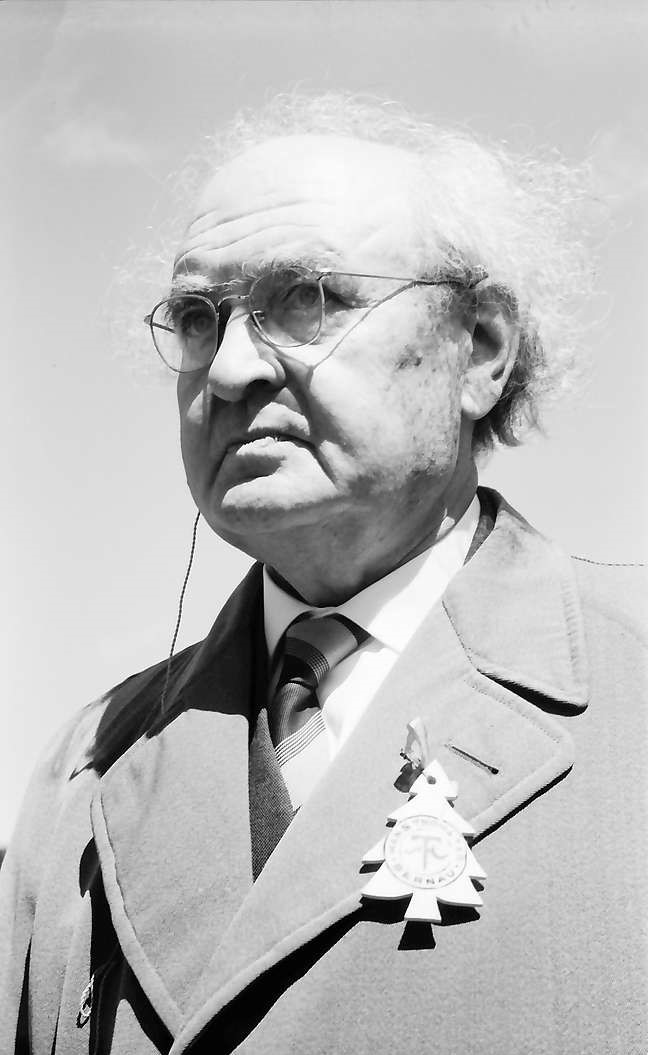
- Philipp in 1963
- Born: Franz Joseph Philipp; 24 August 1890; Freiburg im Breisgau, Baden-Württemberg, Germany
- Died: 2 June 1972 (aged 81); Freiburg im Breisgau, Baden-Württemberg, Germany
- Education: Herz-Jesu-Kirche; University of Freiburg; City of Basel Music Academy
- Occupations: Church musician; composer; music educator
- Years active: 1910s–1940s

Franz Joseph Philipp (24 August 1890 – 2 June 1972) was a German church musician and composer. He studied and later taught various instruments including organ, worked as a composer, directed a conservatory, and founded a school for organ, a chamber orchestra, an institute for church music, and a choir. In the 1930s, he was highly valued by the Nazi regime as a composer, gaining a reputation he tried to undo after the war. Philipp was born in and died in Freiburg im Breisgau and worked in Basel and Karlsruhe as well.

== Biography ==
Philipp was born in Freiburg im Breisgau. His musical education began in 1908 at the Hochschule für Musik Freiburg, where he studied violin, composition, and musical theory.

He took up a position as organist while he was still in school, at the Herz-Jesu-Kirche in Freiburg, the same church where his first composition for mass was to be performed. From 1911 to 1912, he studied philosophy and literature at the University of Freiburg, and from 1912 to 1913, he studied organ, counterpoint and improvisation with Adolf Hamm (a former student of Max Reger and Karl Straube) at the City of Basel Music Academy. In 1914 he recorded 23 piano rolls for the Welte Philharmonie Organ.

During World War I, Philipp was sent to the Vosges mountains, where he suffered irreversible damage to his hearing. In 1916, his Deutschlands Stunde ("Germany's Hour"), a cantata full of enthusiasm for the war effort, was performed by the Berlin Philharmonic.

From 1919 to 1924, Philipp was active as a church musician in the St. Martin (Freiburg-Altstadt) in Freiburg, and from 1923 he taught organ, song, theory and music history at the teacher's college. He was married to Sophie Hummel in 1924 and received an appointment as director of what was then the Baden Conservatory of Music in Karlsruhe, which became the Hochschule für Musik Karlsruhe under his direction. He led the school until 1942.

His son Johannes, who was born in 1925, died in 1944 in Operation Neptune, during the Normandy landings. In the next few years, Franz Philipp was extraordinarily active and founded, in 1925 and 1926, the Badische Orgelschule, the Institute for Catholic Church Music, the Badischer Kammerchor, and the Baden Chamber Orchestra. From 1925 to 1927 he also led the Bachchor Karlsruhe.

After the Nazis came to power, Philipp joined the Nazi Party on 1 May 1933, and began composing pieces for performances at Thingspiele for Nazi feasts and other occasions. Philipp was highly rated by those in power, and his orchestral work Heldische Feier, Opus 35, was celebrated in the Völkischer Beobachter as an "exemplary national-socialist composition, while the spirit of our struggle and the expressive power of the music stand before us as two valid testimonials of the inner truth of this new world view".

Despite his closeness to the Nazi regime, his strong roots in Catholic Church music apparently caused him personal difficulty and professional conflicts, and in 1942, he stepped down as director of the Musikhochschule Karlsruhe. After that, he was active in Freiburg as a freelance composer. Herbert Haag states in his biography that health reasons may have been behind his resignation from Karlsruhe, and dates it to 1941. After the war, Philipp seems to have been able to underplay his important role in Nazi music; he replaced the opus numbers of Nazi compositions, when such compositions hurt his career, with religious compositions under the same numbers. In the festschrift published for his 70th birthday, the Third Reich is not mentioned. In 1960, he was given the inaugural Reinhold-Schneider-Preis, and also received the Order of Merit of the Federal Republic of Germany, Merit cross first class. He died in 1972 in his native city and was buried in the Hauptfriedhof Freiburg im Breisgau.

== Work ==
Philipp worked for a new orientation of Catholic church music. He based his works on Gregorian chant and German Volkslied. He left only a few organ works, although he was known as an organ improvisor. His organ music is inspired by Max Reger. He composed mainly choral music.

From 1960 to 1979, the association dedicated to his work, the Franz-Philipp-Gesellschaft, published the magazine Vox. His works are kept by the scientific Baden State Library.
