= Reinhold-Schneider-Preis =

Cultural prize awarded by Freiburg im Breisgau, Germany

The Reinhold-Schneider-Preis (Reinhold Schneider Prize) is the cultural prize awarded by the German town of Freiburg im Breisgau. It has been awarded biennially since 1960, alternating between literature, music and art. In addition to the main prize of €15,000, a Förderpreis (scholarship) of €6,000 is awarded. A connection of the recipient to Freiburg is essential, as was the case for the writer Reinhold Schneider, after whom the prize is named.

== Recipients ==
- 1960: Franz Philipp (music)
- 1962: Franz Schneller (literature)
- 1964: Rudolf Riester (art)
- 1966: Theodor Egel (music), Dietrich von Bausznern (Förderpreis), Peter Förtig (Förderpreis)
- 1968: Kurt Heynicke (literature)
- 1970: Walter Schelenz (art), Jürgen Brodwolf (Förderpreis)
- 1972: Wolfgang Fortner (music)
- 1974: Christoph Meckel (literature, art)
- 1976: Peter Dreher (art), Rudolf Dischinger (Förderpreis)
- 1978: Carl Seemann (music), Wolfgang Rihm (Förderpreis)
- 1980: Peter Huchel (literature), Maria Wimmer (Förderpreis)
- 1982: Karl-Heinz Scherer (art), Bernd Völkle (Förderpreis), Susi Juvan (Förderpreis)
- 1984: Klaus Huber (music), Ernst Helmuth Flammer (Förderpreis), Frank Michael (Förderpreis)
- 1986: Walter Dirks (literature), Nina Gladitz (Förderpreis), Peter Krieg (Förderpreis)
- 1988: Artur Stoll (art), Christine Gerstel-Naubereit (Förderpreis), Lotte Paepke (Förderpreis)
- 1990: Experimentalstudio des SWR: Hans Peter Haller and André Richard (music), Walter Mossmann (Förderpreis)
- 1993: Allmende, Arnold Stadler (Förderpreis)
- 1995: Svetlana Geier (literature), Ragni Maria Gschwend (Förderpreis)
- 1997: Peter Staechelin (art), Viola Keiser (Förderpreis), Hans Rath (Förderpreis)
- 1999: Edith Picht-Axenfeld (music), Günter Steinke (Förderpreis)
- 2002: Kyra Stromberg (literature), Helma und Bernhard Hassenstein (Ehrengabe), Annette Pehnt (Stipendium)
- 2004: Peter Vogel (art), Freya Richter (scholarship), Sabine Wannenmacher (scholarship)
- 2006: Freiburger Barockorchester (music), Dieter Ilg (Förderpreis)
- 2008: Wolfgang Heidenreich (literature), Martin Gülich (Förderpreis), Erika Glassen and Jens Peter Laut (Ehrengabe)
- 2010: Thomas Kitzinger (art), Beatrice Adler und Stefanie Gerhardt (Stipendium)
- 2012: Rainer Kussmaul (music), Cécile Verny Quartet and Günter A. Buchwald (Förderpreis)
- 2014: Klaus Theweleit (literature) and Lisa Kränzler (Stipendium)
- 2016: Susi Juvan (art), Andreas von Ow (Stipendium) and Helga Marten (Ehrengabe)
- 2018: ensemble recherche (music), Ralf Schmid (Stipendium) and BAR (Stipendium)
- 2020: Dietmar Dath (literatur), Stefanie Höfler (Stipendium), Iris Wolff (Stipendium) and Evelyn Grill (Ehrenpreis)
- 2020: Graham Smith and Maria Pires (art), Theater der Immoralisten (Stipendium), Vanessa Valk and Jens Burde (Stipendium), Renate Obermaier and Heinz Spagl (Ehrenpreis)
- 2022: Cristina Ohlmer (art), Florian Thate (Stipendium), Emeka Udemba (Stipendium), Annette Merkenthaler (Ehrenpreis), Reinhild Dettmer-Finke (art), Anas Kahal (Stipendium), Gründungsmitglieder der Freiburger Medienwerkstatt e. V. (Ehrenpreis)
- 2024: Murat Coşkun (music), Friederike Scheunchen (Stipendium), Mädchenkantorei am Freiburger Münster (Stipendium)
