= Günter Steinke =

German composer and teacher (born 1956)

Günter Steinke (born 24 April 1956) is a German composer and teacher. He is currently professor of instrumental composition at the Folkwang University of the Arts in Essen, Germany.

== Biography ==
Steinke was born 24 April 1956 in Lübeck. He studied at the Hochschule für Musik Freiburg during 1984–88, with Klaus Huber (composition), Mesías Maiguashca (electronic music) and Peter Förtig (music theory). In 1988 he attended Darmstadt Ferienkurse with a scholarship, and in 1989 worked at Experimentalstudio of the Heinrich Strobel Foundation of South West German Radio (SWR). During 1990–91 Steinke studied at the Schloss Solitude Academy, Stuttgart. After his studies, Steinke remained in Freiburg until being appointed to the University of the Arts Bremen as a lecturer in 1996. He continued there as guest professor from 1999 until 2001, then during the period 2002–2003 he was director of the university's electronic music studio. In 2004 he was appointed as professor of instrumental composition at the Folkwang University of the Arts, where he still teaches. He is chairman of the Ruhr Society for New Music.

His music is published by Boosey & Hawkes.

== Compositions ==
- RHO (1986) for solo contrabassoon
- String Trio (1988)
- C-Arco (1988) for solo cello
- Wandlungen I (1990) for ensemble
- Randgewächse – brüchige Wucherungen (1990) for ensemble
- "Schleichende Gesänge" for 4 voices and live electronics (1991)
- Nachklang (1991) for baritone saxophone, percussion and double bass
- ... kaum einen Hauch (1991) for solo bass flute
- ARCADE (1991–92) for cello and live electronics
- FUSION (1992) for ensemble
- TERRAIN (1993), for orchestra
- Durchbrochene Räume (1994, rev. 1998) for flute, cello and piano
- Die Welt auf dem Mond (Il mondo della luna / The World on the Moon) by Franz Joseph Haydn, arranged by Günter Steinke, 1994–95
- The unquestioned Answer (1995) for tuba and live electronics (collaboration with Melvyn Poore)
- Annäherungen (1996) for ensemble
- Die Vorstellung des Chaos (1998) for four spatialised orchestral groups, after Joseph Haydn
- In Nomine (1999) for flute, clarinet & string trio
- "Vereinzelt, gebannt – ein Wegbeschreibung" (2000) for string quartet
- … wie eine Feuerflamme (2000) for female voice and ensemble
- Augit-à jour (2000) for clarinet, trombone, viola, double bass, percussion and live electronics (2000)
- Innen bewegt (2001) for orchestra and CD
- Till Eulenspiegel (2004) opera for children (libretto by Helga Utz) – premiere Staatstheater Darmstadt 16.05.2004)
- ZugUmzug (2008) for four trombones (written for Composers Slide Quartet)
- AREA (2008/9) for ensemble
- für dich (2010) for ensemble
- Area II (2011) for ensemble
- Quasar (2013) for ensemble and large orchestra (spatialised)
- reißend-still (2014) for orchestra, first performed 12.12.2014
- fließend-gespannt (2014) for orchestra, first performed 16.1.2015

His music has been recorded on WERGO / Deutscher Musikrat 6541-2 (String Trio, "... kaum einen Hauch", Annäherungen, ARCADE, Durchbrochene Räume), as well as on documentation sets from Witten 1990 (String Trio) and 1992 (ARCADE), Donaueschingen 1993 (Terrain) and 1997 (ARCADE). He is featured on two ensemble recherche CD projects, the Witten In Nomine book, on Kairos (In Nomine) and Love Songs, on Wergo (für dich). Rohan de Saram included C-Arco on a recital CD released by Edition Zeitklang.

== Sources ==
- Steinke, Günter, Texte und Essays, edited by Stefan Drees, Pfau-Verlag, ISBN 978-3-89727-363-4
