= Michel Roth (composer) =

Swiss composer

Michel Roth (born June 26, 1976 in Altdorf, Uri, Switzerland) is a Swiss composer, music researcher, and university professor.

== Life ==
Michel Roth studied musicology and linguistics for one year at the University of Basel and then composition and music theory with Roland Moser at the City of Basel Music Academy. After graduating with honors, he spent two more years studying with Detlev Müller-Siemens. In 2001, he was appointed to the Lucerne School of Music, where he worked as a professor of composition and music theory and headed the Studio for Contemporary Music. In this role, Michel Roth collaborated with Sofia Gubaidulina, Pierre Boulez, Péter Eötvös, Helmut Lachenmann and George Benjamin and established the Contemporary Art Performance course in cooperation with Lucerne Festival Academy. On his initiative, the Lucerne Academy for Contemporary Music was founded in 2010. In 2011, he accepted an appointment as professor of composition, music theory and artistic research at the Basel Academy of Music, where he is also a member of the research department. In 2022, he received his doctorate in musicology from the University of Basel.

As a composer, Roth has collaborated with many renowned performers from across the world, including the Bavarian Radio Symphony Orchestra (Martyn Brabbins), the Basel Sinfonietta, the Orchestre de Chambre de Lausanne, the Musikkollegium Winterthur, the Klangforum Wien (Sylvain Cambreling), the Ensemble Mosaik Berlin, the Ensemble Phoenix Basel, the Ensemble Ascolta Stuttgart, the Stuttgarter Vocalsolisten, and the JACK Quartet. He has been a guest at numerous international festivals, including the Lucerne Festival, Musica Viva (Munich), the Witten Days for New Chamber Music, the Warsaw Autumn, the Days for New Music Zurich, and the Alpentöne Festival, and has served several times as a tutor at the Darmstädter Ferienkurse.

In 2003, Roth received a commission from the Swiss Association of Musicians, and in 2005, 2007, 2011, and 2015 from the Swiss Arts Council Pro Helvetia. He has also received numerous prizes and grants, including the 2007 BMW Composition Prize from Musica Viva Munich for his orchestral piece Der Spaziergang. His first opera, Im Bau, was staged by Georges Delnon at the Theater Basel in 2011 followed by productions in Zurich and Barcellona and later appeared as an audio play and interactive website. The contemporary operetta Die Künstliche Mutter was created in 2016 as a co-production of the Lucerne Festival and Gare du Nord Basel (supported by the Ernst von Siemens Music Foundation). Many of his more recent works have a game theory background, especially pod (2017) and SPIEL HÖLLE (2021) – the latter work is set in a pinball club in full swing. A wide range of his works are published by Ricordi.

In addition to his artistic work, Roth researches and publishes on musicological and music-theoretical topics. He was co-author of books on contemporary playing techniques for percussion and trombone, the latter of which was awarded Best-Edition at the international Musikmesse Frankfurt 2018. As music curator, he contributed to four interdisciplinary exhibition projects Harmonie und Dissonanz (2006), Neoimpressionismus und Moderne (2008), LINEA (2011), and Dieter Roth and Music (2014) at the Kunsthaus Zug and the Hamburger Bahnhof Berlin. Based on his studies of the group Selten gehörte Musik ("Rarely Heard Music”) (2012–2014), he developed a generalized game-theoretical description of musical indeterminacy, which from one perspective can be applied historiographically to aesthetic processes in John Cage, David Tudor, Sylvano Bussotti, Christian Wolff or Cornelius Cardew, and conversely opens up generative new perspectives for contemporary composition and music improvisation. In 2023, he initiated and curated the international festival SPIEL! Games as Critical Practice in the foyer public of Theater Basel with guests ranging from game designer Mary Flanagan to composer James Saunders.

In 2025 he was guest lecturer in musicology at the University of Basel. As an associate researcher at the Uri Institute for Alpine Cultures of the University of Lucerne, he deals with questions of Alpine sound sociology. He is renowned for his discovery of the rich variety of natural resonances of cable car ropes in the Alps (“singing”), for which he developed a special recording device as a citizen science project. Since 2020, he has been documenting his findings in his own sound archive. This data was used equally by the techno music scene and by the industry.

== Works (selection) ==
=== Music theater ===
- Räuber-Fragmente (Robert Walser) for actor, improvising soloist, saxophone, guitar and double bass 2011
- Im Bau (Franz Kafka) for soprano, oboe, cello and piano 2011
- Die Künstliche Mutter (Hermann Burger) for soprano, mezzosoprano, tenor, baritone, two actresses and ensemble 2016
- SPIEL HÖLLE, a game performance for ensemble and pinball club 2021

=== Orchestral works ===
- Arnold Schönberg: Drei Klavierstücke op.11, arranged for orchestra by Michel Roth 1999
- Es weckt das Lied die Liebe, piano songs by Gustav Mahler arranged for orchestra by Michel Roth 2003
- Nachtstück from Der ferne Klang by Franz Schreker, arranged for chamber orchestra by Michel Roth 2006
- Der Spaziergang for two baritones and orchestra 2007
- rebotco for orchestra 2012
- Die letzte Welt for percussion solo and orchestra 2018

=== Ensemble works ===
- Schöllenen for ensemble 2001
- Die auf dich zurückgreifende Zeit for six singers and ensemble 2006
- PESSOA for nine singers and ensemble 2007
- molasse vivante for ensemble 2007
- MOI for large ensemble (based on original tapes by Giacinto Scelsi) 2012/13
- DOPPELQUINTETT for wind and string quartet and a game master 2017
- pod for large ensemble and live-electronics 2017
- SPIEL HÖLLE for prepared saxophone, e-guitar, synthesizer/sampler, percussion and live-electronics 2022
- RAMANUJAN FEVER DREAM for mobile ensemble in three rooms, audio- and video-feedback and live-electronics 2022

=== Chamber music ===
- verinnerung for piano trio 2001
- erschöpfung for string trio 2002
- verrückung (...Boogie-Woogie) for piano quartet 2003/rev.2010
- Quellmund for oboe and string trio 2004
- HOAX. Variations for two guitars 2004
- molasse vivante for piano duo 2004
- Fünf Schritte for eight hands on one piano 2005
- Mr. Wint and Mr. Kidd for flute, piano and percussion 2005
- Zwirn for four natural horns 2007
- Wendungen for speaker and piano quintet (as counterpart to Schoenberg's Ode to Napoleon) 2014
- (w)hole for string quartet 2018
- Der sechste Sinn. A Konrad Bayer-Medley for alto saxophone/Bontempi-saxophone, trombone/harmonica und piano/toy piano 2022

=== Solo works ===
- Töne oder Tiere for natural horn 2006
- Trois Têtes de Giacometti for percussion 2007
- Tête - Crâne for clarinet 2007
- KAVALKADE for double bass 2007
- Eins und Alles for organ 2008
- Plaie et Douceur for viola 2009
- Raumerweiterungssignale for eighth-tone horn and live-electronics 2011
- Die Zunge des Gletschers for singing double bass 2015
- LAUT Etude for trombone 2016
- Random Walks for Baroque violin 2020
- AROMA for oboe d’amore 2021
- 8 Games for Sampler (Pinball Etude No. 1) 2022
- MEDUSA (Pinball Etude No. 3) for double bass 2023
- TILT Mechanics (Pinball Etude No. 2) for percussion 2024
- to be held for a long time (nach La Monte Young) for saline infusions, a copper kettle and two metallophone bars 2001/rev.2008
- Gondelwandel for four transducers, subwoofer, audio player and cable car gondola 2021/2022
- Handlaufbahn (Hommage à Christoph Rütimann) for four transducers, live-transmitted cable car sounds and metal handrail 2022
- Seilsender for five live-streams of Alpine cable bars as immersive sound installation 2023
- Tonträger, sonification of a pylon of the cable car Espel-Stöfeli-Chäserrugg Toggenburg (May to October) 2024

== Writings (selection) ==
- Varèse analysieren, in: Felix Meyer und Heidy Zimmermann (eds.): Edgard Varèse: Komponist, Klangforscher, Visionär, eine Publikation der Paul-Sacher-Stiftung Basel und dem Museum Tinguely, Schott, Mainz 2006, pp. 480–481.
- Matthias Haldemann (ed.): Harmonie und Dissonanz. Gerstl Schönberg Kandinsky. Malerei und Musik im Aufbruch, Kunsthaus Zug in Zusammenarbeit mit der Musikhochschule Luzern, Einleitung von Christian Meyer, ausführlicher interdisziplinärer Gesprächstext von Andreas Brenner, Matthias Haldemann, Michel Roth und einer abschliessenden Diskussion mit Pierre Boulez, Hatje Cantz, Ostfildern 2006.
- Das magische Quadrat und Schönberg, der Erfinder, in: Musikhochschule Luzern, Arnold Schönberg Center, Wien (eds.): Das Magische Quadrat, eine Annäherung an den Visionär Arnold Schönberg, multimediale Buchbox mit 10 Druck- und Spielobjekten, einer CD und einem Vexieretui von und über Arnold Schönberg, zahlreiche Originalbeiträge u. a. von Ch. Meyer, M. Roth, M. Böggemann, U.P. Jauch, C. Emmenegger, A. Jacob, E. Fess und einem Geleitwort von Nuria Schönberg-Nono, Edizioni Periferia, Poschiavo/Luzern 2006.
- Arnold Schönbergs Begriff der Klangfarbenmelodie and Harmonie und Dissonanz, Wahrnehmung und Vermittlung, in: Claudia Emmenegger, Elisabeth Schwind, Olivier Senn (eds.): Musik – Wahrnehmung – Sprache, Bericht des gleichnamigen Symposiums anlässlich von Lucerne Festival Sommer 2006, Reihe: Eine Publikation der Musikhochschule Luzern, Chronos Verlag, Luzern 2007, pp. 59–80.
- Schöpferisches Potenzial. Komponieren in der Zentralschweiz, in: Alois Koch (ed.): Kreative Provinz. Musiklandschaft Zentralschweiz, Pro Libro Verlag, Luzern 2010, pp. 218–245.
- Draw a straight line and follow it’. Eine Phänomenologie der Linie in der Musik, in: Matthias Haldemann (ed.): Linea. Vom Umriss zur Aktion: Die Kunst der Linie zwischen Antike und Gegenwart, Hatje Cantz, Ostfildern 2010, pp. 291–310.
- ‘Bousculer le temps, bousculer l’espace’. Allusions- und Montagetechnik in Maurice Ravels Oper ‘L’Enfant et les Sortilèges’, in: Michael Kunkel, Thomas Gartmann (eds.): Musik – Buchstaben – Musik. Kunst und Forschung an der Hochschule für Musik Basel, Saarbrücken 2013, S. 80–126.
- Dieter Roth und die Musik. Discography, Edizioni Periferia, Poschiavo/Luzern 2014, Discography.
- Dieter Roth and Music. „And away with the minutes“, Catalogue to the Exhibition at Kunsthaus Zug and Hamburger Bahnhof Berlin, Edizioni Periferia, Poschiavo/Luzern 2014, Dieter Roth and Music. And away with the minutes.
- Dieter Roth and Music, online publication and database, 2015.
- Mimesis und Mimikry: (Selbst)kritische Anmerkungen zur musiktheoretischen und kompositorischen Anwendung von Sonagrammen, in: Michael Kunkel (ed.): Les Espaces Sonores. Stimmungen, Klanganalysen, spektrale Musiken, Pfau Verlag, Büdingen 2016, pp. 78–96.
- ‘I allow myself to think of you not as of somebody playing the piano’. Zur Interaktion von Komposition und Interpretation im Umfeld der Darmstädter Ferienkurse, in: Michael Rebhahn und Thomas Schäfer (eds.), Darmstädter Beiträge zur Neuen Musik, Bd. 23, Mainz 2016, pp. 49–57.
- Smorzando. Chopin on the MP3 player, in: Journal of Sonic Studies, 13 (2017), Smorzando. Chopin on the MP3 player.
- The Techniques of Trombone Playing, Bärenreiter Verlag, Kassel 2017, The techniques of trombone playing / Die Spieltechnik der Posaune.
- The Techniques of Percussion Playing. Mallets, Implements and Applications, Bärenreiter Verlag, Kassel 2018, The techniques of percussion playing. Mallets, Implements and applications / Die Spieltechnik des Schlagzeugs. Schlägel, Anreger und Anwendungen.
- In der Konkretion der Unmittelbarkeit. Die humorale Funktion der Musik, in: Matthias Haldemann (ed.): Komödie des Daseins. Kunst und Humor von der Antike bis heute. Hatje Cantz, Berlin 2018, pp. 414–435.
- Im Bau/In the Burrow, online publication and instructive web application, 2018.
- ‘Tosatti, c’est moi’ (arranging Scelsi's tapes today), in: Björn Gottstein und Michael Kunkel (eds.), Scelsi revisited backstage, Büdingen 2020, pp. 200–206.
- Play it anew, man! Ein spieltheoretisches Quartett über relationales Komponieren, in: MusikTexte, Nr. 164 (Februar 2020), pp. 47–54, Play it anew, man! Ein spieltheoretisches Quartett über relationales Komponieren.
- ‘Es gibt da einen Vertreter, der mir nicht gehorcht.’ Eine kleine Studie zur Rolle des Spielverderbers in der neueren Musik, in: Marion Saxer, Karin Dietrich, Julian Kämper (eds.), Musik als Spiel. Spiel als Musik. Die Integration von Spielkonzepten in zeitgenössischer Musik, Musiktheater und Klangkunst, Bielefeld 2021, pp. 111–150, "Es gibt da einen Vertreter, der mir nicht gehorcht.": Eine kleine Studie zur Rolle des Spielverderbers in der neueren Musik.
- Musik unter 'extremen Kommunikationsbedingungen' bei Bernd Alois Zimmermann und Jacques Wildberger, in: Michael Kunkel (ed.), Das linke Ohr. Der Komponist Jacques Wildberger, Büdingen 2021, pp. 179–195, Das linke Ohr. Der Komponist Jacques Wildberger.
- Play it anew, man! A Game-Theoretical Quartet about Relational Composing, in: Perspectives of New Music, Vol. 59, Nr. 1 (Winter 2021), pp. 5–31, Project MUSE -- Verification required!.
- Vielsaitige Instrumente: Schächentaler Seilbahnen als klangliche Akteure und Resonanzkörper, in: Syntopia Alpina, Online-Magazin (Juni 2022).
- Gaming the System. Produktive Erweiterungen musikalischer Spielkompetenz, in: Neue Zeitschrift für Musik (Juni 2023), pp. 30–33.
- Vielsaitige Instrumente: Schächentaler Seilbahnen als klangliche Akteure und Resonanzkörper, in: Urner Institut Kulturen der Alpen (ed.), Nutzen Benutzen Hegen Pflegen. Die Alpen im Anthropozän, Zürich 2023, pp. 137–143.
- Singende Seile. Die Seilbahnlandschaft des Urner Schächentals, bildfluss Verlag, Altdorf 2023, Singende Seile. Die Seilbahnlandschaft des Urner Schächentals.
- Ropesinging, online database of "singing ropes" in the Swiss Alps, 2023.
- A Musical Essay on Vicentino's 2nd Tuning (1555), in: Martin Kirnbauer (ed.), Zwischen Vieltönigkeit und Mikrotonalität. Materialien und Beiträge aus dem Forschungsprojekt "Studio31", Schola Cantorum Basiliensis Scripta, Basel 2024, pp. 245–251, Schwabe online.
- ’Hörend erkennen, erkennend hören’. Die Vermittlung des Indeterminierten in Peter Benarys Zweitem Streichquartett, in: Niccolò Raselli, Hans Niklas Kuhn (eds.): Peter Benary. Komponist, Musikwissenschafter, Publizist und Dozent, Basel 2024, pp. 115–130, Schwabe online.
- Die Bibliothek von Basel. Unendliche Klänge und eine neue Heimat, in: LIBREAS. Library Ideas, 45 (2024), Die Bibliothek von Basel. Unendliche Klänge und eine neue Heimat.
- Aufs Spiel gesetzt. Eine spieltheoretische Untersuchung indeterminierter Musik, Dissertation Universität Basel, Wolke-Verlag, Hofheim 2024, Aufs Spiel gesetzt. Eine spieltheoretische Untersuchung indeterminierter Musik, open access: Put on the line - Wolke Publishing
- Critical Games, online proceedings and database of the Festival SPIEL! Games as Critical Practice (Basel 2022), 2024.

== Discography ==
- PATERA für 4 Hörner und 4 Schlagzeuger (Müller & Schade 5042/2) 2003
- verinnerung für Klaviertrio (musiques suisses CTS-M88) 2004
- molasse vivante für Klavierduo (musiques suisses CTS-M107) 2007
- Trois Têtes de Giacometti für Schlagzeug solo (musiques suisses CTS-M121) 2009
- PESSOA für 9 Singstimmen und Ensemble (musiques suisses CTS-M120) 2009
- Kavalkade für Kontrabass solo (Dux 0800/0801) 2010
- Grammont Portrait Michel Roth (musiques suisses CTS-M136) 2012
- Räuber-Fragmente für Schauspieler, improvisierenden Solisten, Saxophon, Gitarre und Kontrabass (musiques suisses CTS-M137) 2012
- Mondrian-Zyklus: erschöpfung für Streichtrio, verinnerung für Klaviertrio, verrückung (...Boogie-Woogie) für Klavierquartett (NEOS 11506) 2015
- Im Bau, radio opera version (WERGO 73842) 2019
- MOI for big ensemble, Klangforum Wien (KAIROS) 2020

== Literature on Michel Roth ==
- Michael Kunkel: ‘Beifügen könnte ich, dass...’. Behauptungen oder Mutmassungen über Michel Roths Komposition 'Der Spaziergang' nach Robert Walser, in: Dissonanz 107 (2009), pp. 8–11.
- Thomas Gartmann: Imaginäre Inszenierungen. Thomas Gartmann im Gespräch mit Michel Roth über die Kammeroper Im Bau, in: Michael Kunkel, Thomas Gartmann (eds.): Musik – Buchstaben – Musik. Kunst und Forschung an der Hochschule für Musik Basel, Saarbrücken 2013, pp. 328–347.
- Boris Previšić: Klaus Schädelin, Yoko Tawada, Hermann Burger. Literarische Gegenkonstruktionen am Gotthard, in: Boris Previšić (ed.): Gotthardfantasien. Eine Blütenlese aus Wissenschaft und Literatur, Baden 2016, pp. 258–268.
- Florian Henri Besthorn: Ausdruckspolyphonie in Längs- und Querschnitten. Artikulationsschichten in Hermann Burgers Roman Die künstliche Mutter (2016) und in der gleichnamigen Musiktheater-Adaption von Michel Roth (2016), in: Silvan Moosmüller, Boris Previšić und Laure Spaltenstein (eds.): Stimmungen und Vielstimmigkeit der Aufklärung, Wallstein Verlag, Göttingen 2017, pp. 354–374.
- Florian Henri Besthorn: Der Spaziergang von Michel Roth mit Robert Walser. Eine musikalische Gegenüberstellung der Textfassungen von 1917 und 1920, in: Lukas Gloor, Rebecca Lötscher (ed.): Goldenes Anfängliches. Neue Beiträge zur Robert Walser-Forschung, München 2020, pp. 93–104.
- Pietro Cavallotti: ‘Eine Art Möglichkeitsfeld von Scelsis Musik’. Michel Roths MOI für Ensemble, in: Björn Gottstein and Michael Kunkel (eds.): Scelsi revisited backstage, Büdingen 2020, pp. 177–199.
- Roman Brotbeck: Das komponierte Labyrinth: Michel Roths Auseinandersetzungen mit Robert Walser, in: Roman Brotbeck: Töne und Schälle. Robert Walser-Vertonungen 1912-2021, Paderborn 2022, pp. 310–321.
- Leo Dick: Réduit und Transitland. Helvetische Selbstbilder in Musiktheaterwerken von Mela Meierhans, Michel Roth und Xavier Dayer, in: Leo Dick, Noémie Favennec und Katelyn Rose King (eds.): Musicking Collective. Codierungen kollektiver Identität in der zeitgenössischen Musikpraxis der Schweiz und ihrer Nachbarländer, Edition Argus, Schliengen/Markgräflerland 2024, pp. 103–119.
