= Peter Dreher =

German artist (1932–2020)

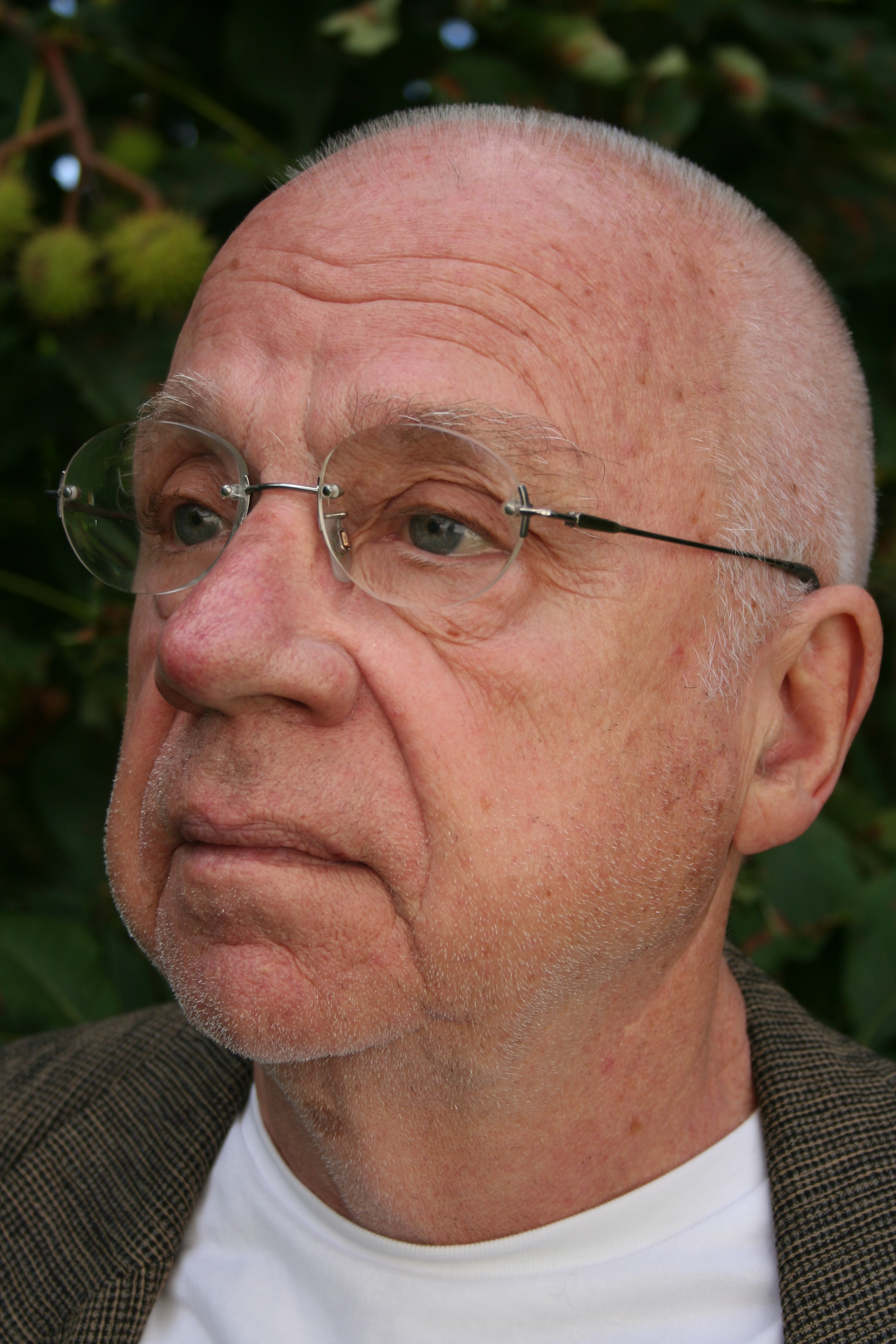
- Dreher in 2012
- Born: 26 August 1932; Mannheim, Germany
- Died: 20 February 2020 (aged 87)
- Known for: Tag um Tag guter Tag
- Awards: Villa Massimo; Reinhold-Schneider-Preis; Order of Merit of the Federal Republic of Germany
- Website: https://peter-dreher.de/

Peter Dreher (26 August 1932 – 20 February 2020) was a German artist and academic teacher. He painted series of landscapes, interiors, flowers and skulls, beginning his series Tag um Tag guter Tag in 1974. As a professor of painting, he influenced artists including Anselm Kiefer. His works have been exhibited internationally.

== Life ==
Dreher was born in Mannheim, Baden-Württemberg. He began to draw at age seven, determined to become an artist. When Dreher was twelve years old, his father was killed fighting in Russia in World War II.

Dreher studied at the Academy of Fine Arts, Karlsruhe in the 1950s, when the artistic trend was leaning towards figurative, with Karl Hubbuch and Wilhelm Schnarrenberger, who stood for the New Objectivity movement, and with Erich Heckel, one of the founders of Die Brücke. He had his first solo exhibition in 1954 at the Städtische Kunsthalle Mannheim.

Dreher became known for his series Tag um Tag guter Tag which he began in 1974, painting the same glass more than 5,000 times. He also created series of landscapes and interiors, flower pieces and skulls. While Dreher admired some ideas of Andy Warhol, Jasper Johns, Robert Rauschenberg and Claes Oldenburg, he opposed various artistic trends of the 1950s and 1960s, such as abstract expressionism, minimalism, postminimalism and pop art, remaining a realistic and figurative painter.

Dreher was a lecturer of painting at the Academy of Fine Arts, Karlsruhe from 1965 at the Freiburg location, and from 1968 a professor there. Among his students were Anselm Kiefer, Klaus Merkel and Eva Rosenstiel. He retired from his position as a professor in 1997.

Dreher died in February 2020 at age 87.

== Work ==
=== Tag um Tag guter Tag ===
In a series begun in 1974, Dreher painted the same empty glass. Called Tag um Tag guter Tag (Day by Day, Good Day), he painted it more than 2,500 times at night and more than 2,500 times during the daytime, in a process similar to meditation.

At first, Dreher had only intended to paint the glass five or six times, but found he did not want to stop. He painted the glass at least fifty times a year, and was still painting it in the 2010s, saying he would stop "when the motivation stopped". He always painted it centered on a 25 x 20cm neutral grey ground, from the same distance and at life scale.

=== Self-portraits ===
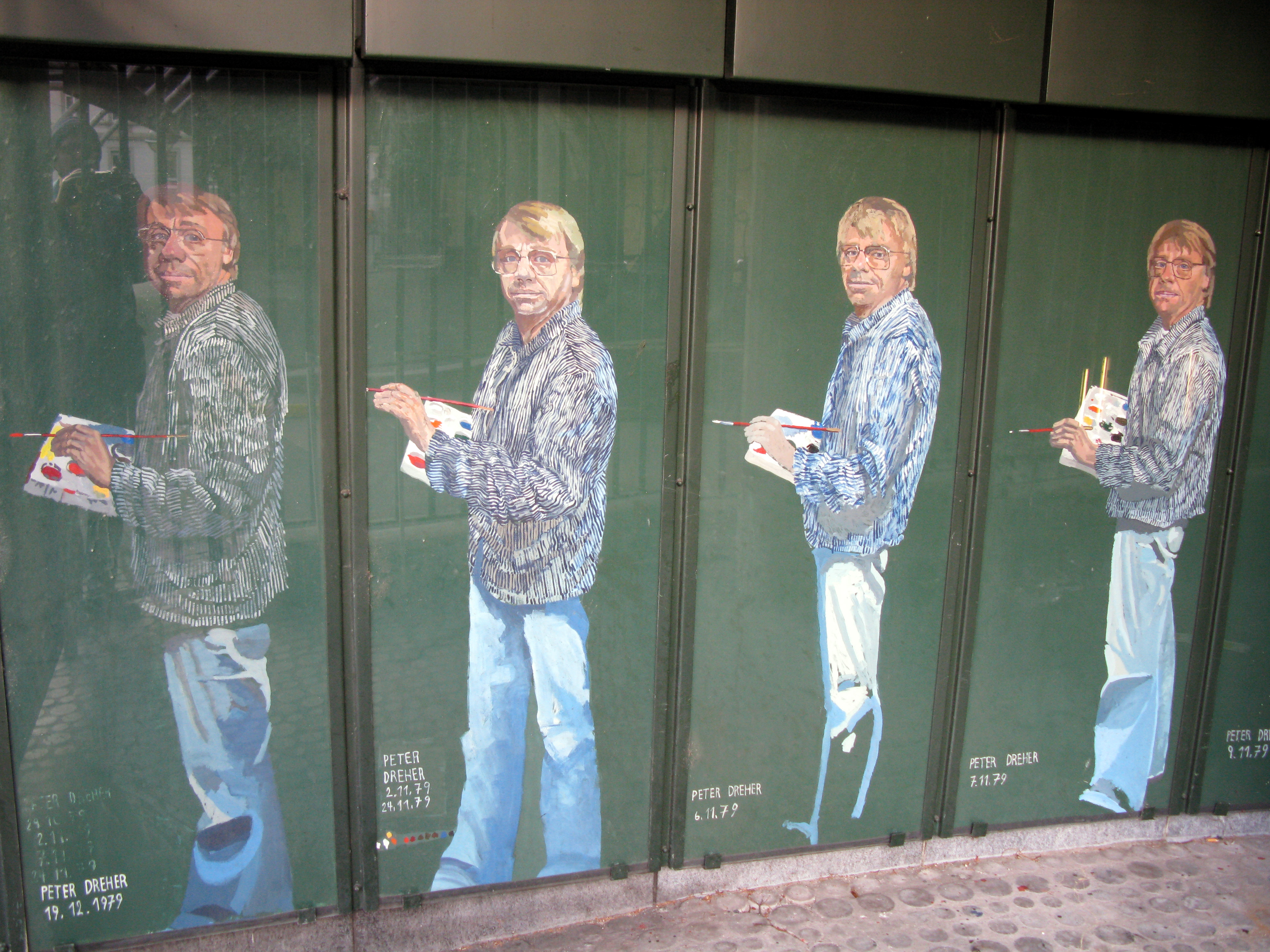
Self portraits (1978), exterior of the library of the University of Freiburg

From 1977 to 1979, Dreher painted on-site several self-portraits as decoration for the library of the University of Freiburg. When the building was demolished, the portraits found a new location.Currently, they are housed in the basement (1 UG.) of the library in between the bookshelves.

=== Exhibitions ===
Dreher's works were shown in international exhibitions including:

- 1954: Städtische Kunsthalle Mannheim
- 1974: Museum Folkwang, Essen
- 1975: Kunstverein Freiburg
- 1976: Galerie Hans Mayer, Düsseldorf
- 1977: Staatliche Kunsthalle Baden-Baden
- 1982: Von der Heydt-Museum, Wuppertal
- 1990: Museum für Neue Kunst Freiburg
- 1993: Badischer Kunstverein, Karlsruhe
- 2002: Patricia Sweetow Gallery, San Francisco, California
- 2008: Kunsthalle Erfurt
- 2011: Musée d'art moderne et contemporain in Geneva
- 2013: MK Galleries, U.K.

== Awards ==
Among Dreher's awards were:

- 1965: Villa Massimo
- 1976: Reinhold-Schneider-Preis of Freiburg
- 1979: Hans-Thoma-Preis of Baden-Württemberg
- 1995: Erich-Heckel-Preis of Künstlerbund Baden-Württemberg
- 2000: Order of Merit of the Federal Republic of Germany
