= Cécile Verny =

French jazz musician (born 1969)

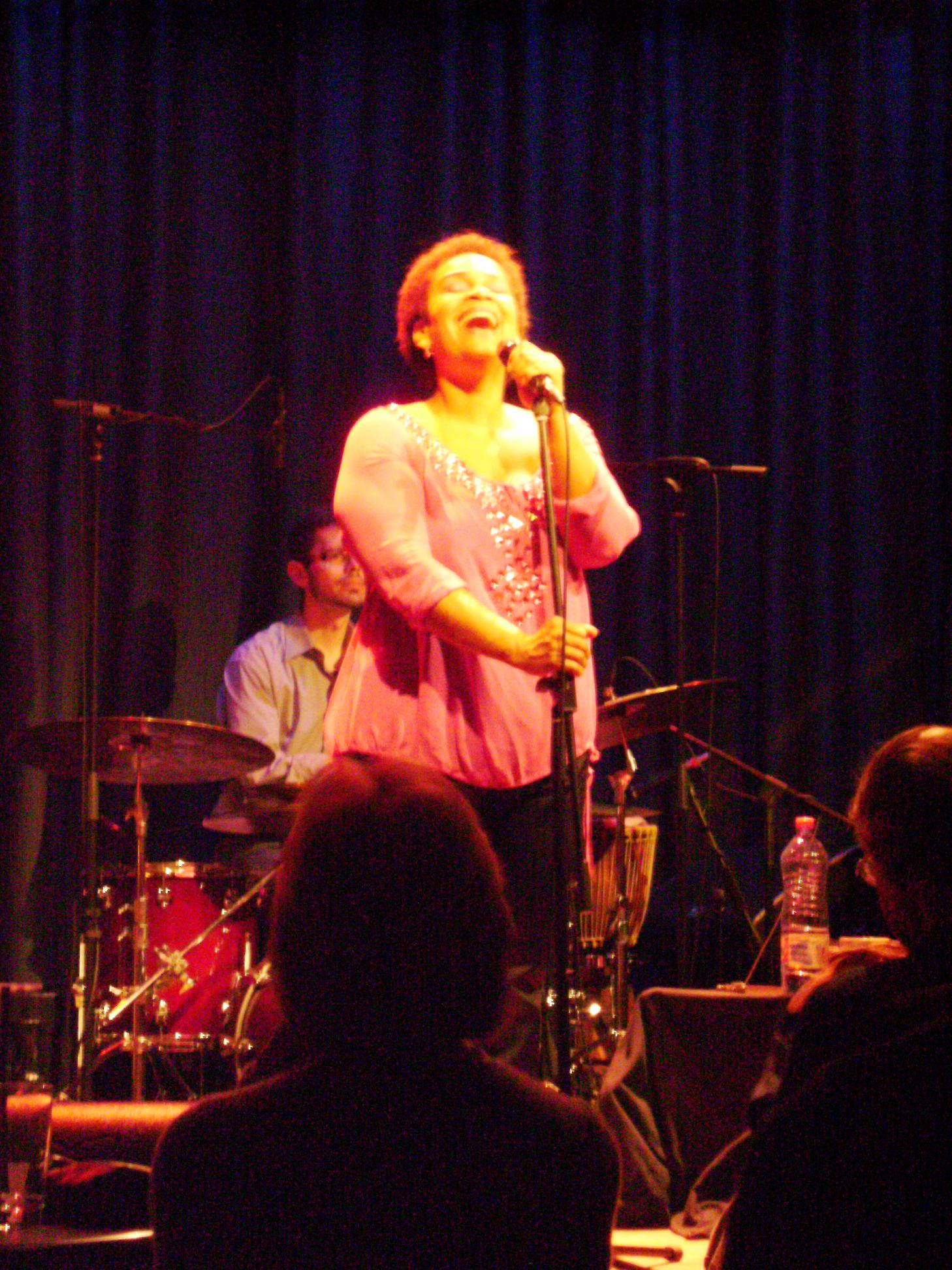
- Cécile Verny at the Düsseldorf Jazz-Schmiede on 2 December 2011

Background information
- Born: 1969 (age 56–57); Abidjan, Ivory Coast
- Genres: Jazz
- Occupations: Musician, songwriter, producer
- Instrument: Vocals
- Years active: 1987–present
- Label: Minor Music
- Member of: Cécile Verny Quartet
- Website: www.cecile-verny.com

Cécile Verny (born 1969) is a French jazz musician and the lead vocalist of the Cécile Verny Quartet, a jazz group based in Germany. Verny moved to France at a young age and later to Germany, where she developed her musical career. Her music blends elements of jazz, rock and French chanson. She is known for the original songs with her quartet and has been distinguished by awards in France and Germany.

== Life and career ==
Born in Abidjan, Ivory Coast, in 1969, Verny moved to France at age twelve, and founded the Cécile Verny Quartet in Strasbourg in 1987. Two years later, she moved to Freiburg im Breisgau, where she developed her musical career both with her quartet and later also as a singer in other groups and recordings. Verny usually writes her own lyrics and sings them mostly in French and English, and less frequently in German. Music critics have emphasized her phrasing, intensity and scat singing, comparing her to American jazz legend Ella Fitzgerald.

Verny and her quartet have received numerous awards, among others an honorable mention of the German Music Critics Award as one of the best albums of 2006 for their album The Bitter and The Sweet, as an "artistically outstanding new release" in jazz. In France, she was awarded the first prize of the "Grand Prix du Jury" as vocal artist at the Festival de Jazz Juan-les-Pins in 2003. In a review of the quartet's 2019 album Of Moons and Dreams, DownBeat magazine called Verny's singing "pristinely delivered" and "embracing constant change and accepting difference".

In 2005, Verny published the first album under her own name, titled European Songbook. Performing exclusively jazz standards written by European composers such as Kurt Weill, Django Reinhardt and Joe Zawinul, she was accompanied by the musicians of her quartet and two additional brass players. Since 2006 she has also performed in concerts and on recordings with the WDR Big Band, such as their album Celebrating Billie Holiday. On her 2019 album Mein Liedgut, she performed arrangements based on German songs by Franz Schubert to Hildegard Knef and Zarah Leander, accompanied only by jazz guitarist Johannes Maikranz. Since 2017, Verny has also repeatedly performed with jazz bands in Lithuania.

Apart from her activities as musician and vocal coach, Verny has been engaged in various community-related social projects. In May 2020, for example, she opened a live streaming series of the project Freiburgzuhause with a concert at the Jazzhaus Freiburg to support the local cultural scene during the COVID-19 pandemic.

== Discography ==
=== Cécile Verny Quartet ===
- Oazoo (1992)
- Patchwork (1995)
- Expressive Impressionen (1995)
- Coquelicot – melodie de vie (1997)
- Got a Ticket (1998)
- Métisse (1999)
- Kekeli (2002)
- Cécile Verny Quartet – live in Antibes (DVD, 2004)
- The Bitter and the Sweet (2006)
- Amoureuse (2008)
- Keep some secrets within (2010)
- Fear & Faith (2013)
- Memory Lane (2014)
- Of Moons and Dreams (2019)

=== Other albums ===
- Le Jazz a plein tubes, with the Orchestre Regional de Jazz d'Alsace, 1991
- Dimba, with Tschisungu Kalomba & Kassala, 1995
- Jazz Affairs, with Peter Baumgärtner's Jazzfriends, 1996
- Dance Away Your Sorrows, with NDeez Soul, 1996
- Of Course, with Kilian Heitzler Big Band, 2000
- A New Beginning, with Intuit, 2001
- I'm on My Way, with Reiner Regel and Gottfried Böttger, 2003
- Intuit 2004, with Intuit, 2004
- Celebrating Billie Holiday, with WDR Big Band, 2008

=== Solo projects ===
- European Songbook with her quartet and additional brass, 2005
- Mein Liedgut, Cécile Verny & Johannes Maikranz, 2019

== Awards and distinctions ==
- 1992 Festival Vocal de Jazz de Crest, France
- 1995 Zelt-Musik-Festival Award, Freiburg
- 2003 First Prize for Vocal Jazz and Grand Prix du Jury, Festival de Jazz Juan-les-Pins
- 2006 Best album list of German Music Critics Award
- 2008 European Jazz Prize
