= Mauricio Rosenmann Taub =

Chilean composer, writer and poet (1932–2021)

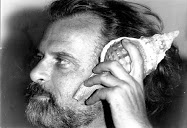
Mauricio Rosenmann Taub 1980

Mauricio Rosenmann Taub (29 June 1932 – 8 March 2021) was a Chilean composer, writer and poet.

== Background ==
A native of Santiago, he studied piano and composition initially in Santiago, then in Stuttgart and Freiburg with a Scholarship of the DAAD. In Paris he studied at the Conservatoire National with Olivier Messiaen and graduated with distinction (premier prix). During this time Rosenmann worked at the French Broadcast at the "Groupe des Recherches Musicales", studied organ with Édouard Souberbielle and musicology. With André Martinet he studied linguistics at the University of Paris (Sorbonne). He returned to Germany, attended the Darmstadt New Music Summer School and joined in Freiburg the class of Wolfgang Fortner. He graduated with a composing degree ("Reifeprüng in Komposition und Musiktheorie") and became a lecturer at the Freiburger Musikhochschule. He was a professor at the Folkwang University of the Arts in Essen 1974 until 1999.

Rosenmann Taub died in Essen on 8 March 2021, at the age of 88.

== Work ==
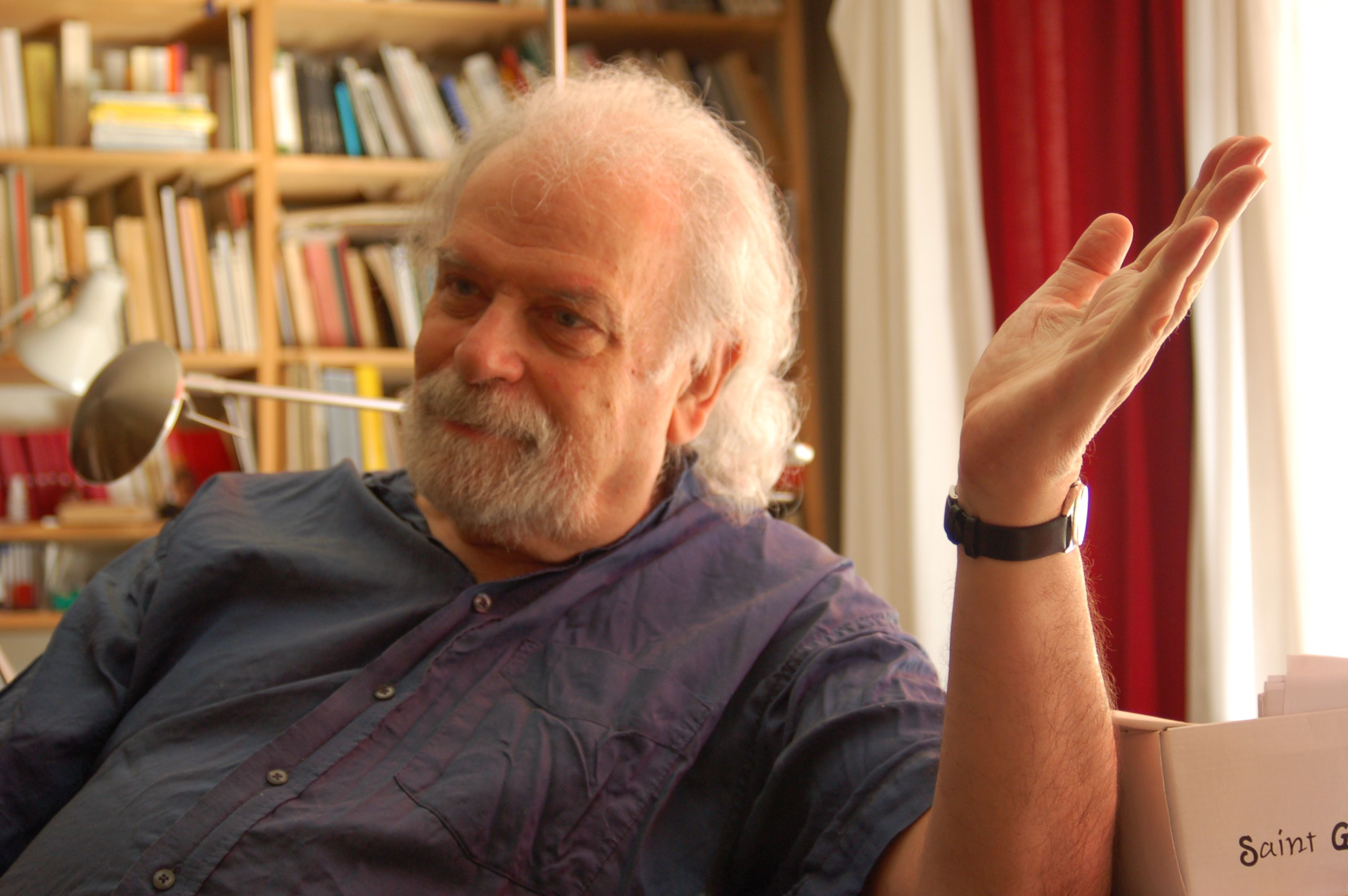
Mauricio Rosenmann Taub 2008

In 1960 some poems by Rosenmann were translated into German and published in Freiburg. In 1969 in both Freiburg and Santiago the book Los Paraguas Del No was presented (review in La Prensa, 1971). Since then, twelve volumes, all conceived as cycles of poems, mainly in Spanish, and several essays have been published as well as compositions for the piano, chamber music and music for the stage, including three operas. Rosenmann's music has been performed by renowned interpreters in various European countries and in Chile. "The work of Mauricio Rosenmann Taub seems like a labyrinth of various arts in which isolated threads of Ariadna always interweaves back to the crossroads of the past-" (Stefan Fricke in the encyclopedia Komponisten der Gegenwart – KDG, "Contemporary Composers", article Rosenmann, 1997).

In his later poems Rosenmann intended to establish a bond between the musical interval and the likeness within words and their components. Raúl Zurita, National Prize for Literatur: «Mauricio Rosenmann Taub takes us back to this indiscernible age in which gesture, graphic symbols and sound do not form separate compartments. His poems create an awareness before reading them, a feeling as if it were a recollection of future language.» Eugen Gomringer declares: «Sharpening the senses of looking and hearing, we perceive something coming from far away and pointing into future.», and about the book Disparación: "There is nothing more beautiful (and important) in our literature than this book."

== Musical works ==
- Fasolauta for flute, piano, synthesizer and tape (1973–76)
- Vis-à-Vis for two pianos and one pianist (1977)
- Maquinación for solo pinball machine and chamber ensemble, role-music (1979–80). ISBN M-50085-008-3
- Frankenstein-OperAzione for solo software, actor, singer, speaking choir, instrumentalists, workstation and tape (1992)
- Ground for piano and basso profondo (1996), ISBN M-50085-007-6
- Scenata (scenic sonatas) – four scenic sonatas for actor, female singer and chamber ensemble (1994–97), ISBN M-50085-010-6
- Solomisazione – Opera Per Una Persona Sola (opera for one single person) (1997–2002), ISBN M-50085-034-2
- Fa-Solstice for two flutes, piano, female singer/speaker and tape (2006), dedicated to Renate Greiss-Armin
- Madam Czerny for solo piano, Étude Nº 1 (2007)
- Modulation, pour piano et celesta, Étude Nº 2 (2012)
- Wig-Lid (lullaby) by Dora Taub for mezzo-soprano, cor anglais, horn, viola, harp and piano, lullaby, dedicated to Eva Rosenmann Taub, instrumentation: M. Rosenmann (1974)
- Pour les vingt doigts for piano and celesta, two-handed (2012–2018)

== Lyric works ==
- Los Paraguas Del No, Freiburg. i. Br./Santiago de Chile 1969 and Saarbrücken 1995, ISBN 3-930735-34-2 Auszug Auszug 2
- El Europicho, 1973–83 (from Sinfonía Para Nombres Solos (Sinfonia for Lonely Names)), Essen 1983/Essen 1996, ISBN 3-89206-781-3
- Temprana Aparición (from Sinfonía Para Nombres Solos), Folkwang-Texte, Essen 1992, ISBN 3-89206-446-6
- Chile o el p/Fisco Sauer (from Sinfonía Para Nombres Solos), art folder with 44 sheets, 1972-83/1995, ISBN 3-930735-33-4
- Formicación, Saarbrücken 1996, ISBN 3-930735-57-1 Auszug
- Alteration : Albumblätter. Saarbrücken 1997, ISBN 3-930735-96-2
- Breviario, Saarbrücken 2001, ISBN 3-89727-163-X Auszug
- Der Ort der Begegnung /El Lugar Del Encuentro (The Place of Encounter)- Ein Bericht über Texte von Eugen Gomringer und Charles Baudelaire sowie über eigene Arbeiten – Versuch einer Interpretation, Saarbrücken 2005, ISBN 3-89727-283-0
- Disparación, Silabario Disparatado, Saarbrücken 2007, ISBN 978-3-89727-376-4; Santiago de Chile 2012, ISBN 978-956-317-178-5
- Invitación al Garabato – Dios es Un Número Entre Diez y Dos, Santiago 2009, ISBN 978-956-284-663-9
- Solo por ser usted, Santiago 2010
- Modulación, RiL editores, Santiago 2012, ISBN 978-956-284-947-0/Pfau-Verlag, Saarbrücken 2012, ISBN 3-89727-283-0
- Preparaíso, Pfau-Verlag Saarbrücken ISBN 978-3-89727-528-7/ RiL editores, Santiago, 2014, ISBN 978-956-01-0128-0 – video of the presentation of the book with Raul Zurita
- Cuando me desperté comprendí que estaba dormido, Colección Escritores chilenos y latinoamericanos, 2015, ISBN 978-956-317-289-8
- Antepoemas, Sinfonía para nombres solos III, 2019/2020 ISBN 978-3-89924-500-4, 978-3-506-84141-4

== Musicology/Literature ==
- Lieder Ohne Ton (Songs without tone) – annotations to Federico Mompou, "Canción"; Ralf R. Ollertz, "Toy Tô"; Carlos Saura, "Cría Cuervos"; Frédéric Chopin, "Préludes", Saarbrücken 1995, ISBN 3-930735-35-0
- Die Entstellung als Analyse- und Kompositionsverfahren (The Deformation as an Analytic and Compositional Method), offprint of the periodical Musiktheorie, 14. Jahrg., Heft 4, 1999
- Ton- und Fingersatz im Finale der h-Moll-Sonate op. 58 von Chopin und in Ondine von Ravel. Musiktheorie, 19. Jahrg., Heft 2, 2004
- Irrealer Klang – irrealer Satz. Einige Bemerkungen über den Anfang von Tristan und über zwei Préludes von Chopin. Musiktheorie, 19. Jahrg., Heft 2, 2004

== Literature ==
- Fricke, Stefan: Mauricio Rosenmann, in: Komponisten der Gegenwart, KDG, ed. Hanns-Werner Heister, Munich: Edition Text u. Kritik, 1992 ff.
- Fricke, Stefan.: Zu den Sehtextbüchern von Mauricio Rosenmann, in: «Positionen 42», Beiträge zur Neuen Musik, Februar 2000
- Raúl Zurita about Modulación of Mauricio Rosenmann Taub at Centro Cultural Gabriela Mistral, Santiago (8. 01. 2013) with the writers Felipe Cussen, Alfonso Mallo and the author.
- Felipe Cussen: Entrevista a Mauricio Rosenmann Taub: De todos los modos posibles
- Paul Guillén: Entrevista a Mauricio Rosenmann Taub, Lima, 2006
- César Díaz-Muñoz Cormatches: Paraguas para lágrimas, en La Prensa (Santiago, 12 de octubre de 1971).
