= Wolfgang Fortner =

German composer and conductor

- Wolfgang Fortner in the 1970s
- Born: 12 October 1907; Leipzig, Saxony, German Empire
- Died: 5 September 1987 (aged 79); Heidelberg, Baden-Württemberg, West Germany
- Education: Leipzig Conservatory
- Occupations: Composer; Conductor; Academic teacher

Wolfgang Fortner (12 October 1907 – 5 September 1987) was a German composer, academic composition teacher and conductor.

== Life and career ==
Fortner was born in Leipzig. From his parents, who were both singers, Fortner very early on had intense contact with music.

In 1927 he began his studies at the Leipzig Conservatory (organ with Karl Straube, composition with Hermann Graubner) and at University of Leipzig, (philosophy with Hans Driesch, musicology with Theodor Kroyer, and German studies with Hermann August Korff) (Weber 2001). While still a student, two of his early compositions were publicly performed: Die vier marianischen Antiphonen at the Lower Rhineland Festival in Düsseldorf in 1928, and his First String Quartet in Königsberg in 1930 (Weber 2001).

In 1931 he completed his studies with the State Exam for a high teaching office, after he accepted a lectureship in music theory at the Hochschule für Kirchenmusik Heidelberg. There his music was attacked as Cultural Bolshevism. In 1935 and 1936 Fortner created the Heidelberg Chamber Orchestra with which he supported New Music and undertook expanded concert journeys for "armed forces support", from Scandinavia to the Netherlands to Greece. In the same year he also took over the directorship of the orchestra of the Hitler Youth of Heidelberg, a string orchestra, formed from juvenile laymen, whose directorship changed in 1939 again. In 1940, he was drafted into the army as a medical soldier.

After the end of the war, Fortner underwent Denazification and was found not affected by professional disqualification. Fortner moved to the Heidelberg Kohlhof and there a group of very young students formed around him, who showed interest in the modern music of 1933. In 1946 he joined the circle of the Darmstadt Internationale Ferienkurse für Neue Musik, and taught within that framework. In 1954 he became a professor for composition at the North-West German Music Academy in Detmold, then from 1957 up to his retirement in 1973 taught in Freiburg. After the death of Karl Amadeus Hartmann, in 1964 he took up the leadership of the musica viva concerts, which he directed until 1978 (Weber 2001).

From 1957 to 1971, he was President of the German section of the ISCM (International Society for Contemporary Music). In 1975, he was named President of the Dramatists' Union.

Together with eleven other composer-friends (Conrad Beck, Luciano Berio, Pierre Boulez, Benjamin Britten, Henri Dutilleux, Alberto Ginastera, Cristóbal Halffter, Hans Werner Henze, Heinz Holliger, Klaus Huber, and Witold Lutosławski), he was asked by Russian cellist Mstislav Rostropovich, on the occasion of the 70th birthday of the Swiss composer and art patron Paul Sacher, to write a composition for cello solo using the notes of his name (eS, A, C, H, E, Re). Wolfgang Fortner created the theme and three variations Zum spielen für den 70. Geburtstag, Thema und Variationen für Violoncello Solo. These compositions were partially presented in Zurich on 2 May 1976.

Wolfgang Fortner died in Heidelberg in 1987, aged 79.

== Awards ==
- 1948 Schreker-Prize Berlin
- 1953 Louis Spohr Prize Brunswick
- 1955 Bearer of the "Great Prize of Art-Music" of North-Rhine/Westphalia
- 1955 Member of the Academy of Arts, Berlin
- 1956 Member of the Bayerische Akademie der Schönen Künste of Munich
- 1960 Bach Prize of the Free and Hanseatic City of Hamburg
- 1972 Reinhold Schneider Prize of Freiburg
- 1977 Golden Needle of the Dramatists' Union
- 1977 Knights Commander of the Order of Merit of the Federal Republic of Germany
- 1977 Honorary Doctorate of the Universities of Heidelberg and Freiburg

== Students ==
See: List of music students by teacher: C to F#Wolfgang Fortner.

Among his students were composers Günther Becker, Friedhelm Döhl, Hans Ulrich Engelmann, Diego H. Feinstein, Peter Förtig, Volkmar Fritsche, Hans Werner Henze, Carl Johnson, Milko Kelemen, Rudolf Kelterborn, Karl Michael Komma, Arghyris Kounadis, Uwe Lohrmann, Wolfgang Ludewig, Roland Moser, Diether de la Motte, Nam June Paik, Graciela Paraskevaidis, Robert HP Platz, Rolf Riehm, Wolfgang Rihm, Griffith Rose, Mauricio Rosenmann, Dieter Schönbach, Manfred Stahnke, Karen Tarlow, Peter Westergaard, Hans Zender, Bernd Alois Zimmermann, Heinz Werner Zimmermann, conductors and Arturo Tamayo and translator Hans Wollschläger.

== Works ==
=== Operas ===
- Bluthochzeit. Lyric Tragedy in 2 Acts/7 Pictures, libretto by the composer after the drama Bodas de sangre by Federico García Lorca in Enrique Beck's German translation (1957)
- Corinna. Opera buffa in one act after a comedy by Gérard de Nerval (1958)
- In seinem Garten liebt Don Perlimplin Belisa. Opera after Federico García Lorca (1962)
- Elisabeth Tudor. Opera in three acts after a libretto by Mattias Braun (1972) at the Deutsche Oper Berlin, with Helga Dernesch and William B. Murray
- That time. Scenic cantata after Samuel Beckett (1977)

=== Ballets ===
- Die weiße Rose, after Oscar Wilde (1950)
- Die Witwe von Ephesus, pantomime after a scenario of Petronius
- Carmen (Bizet Collagen), music for a ballet by John Cranko (1971)

=== Other works ===
- String Quartet No. 1 (published 1930)
- Concerto for organ and strings (published 1932)
- Concertino in G minor for viola and chamber orchestra (1934)
- Sonatina for piano (1935)
- Concerto for string orchestra (1935?)
- Sinfonia concertante (published 1937)
- String Quartet No. 2 (published 1938)
- Piano Concerto (published 1943)
- Violin Sonata (1945)
- Violin Concerto (1947; written for Gerhard Taschner)
- Flute Sonata (1947)
- Symphony 1947 (1947)
- String Quartet No. 3 (1948)
- Fantasy (music)|Phantasie über die Tonfolge BACH for Orchestra (1950)
- Cello Concerto (1951)
- The Creation (Die Schōpfung) for middle voice and orchestra (1954). Recorded by Dietrich Fischer-Dieskau (with the Sinfonie Orchester des Norddeutschen Rundfunks conducted by Hans Schmidt-Isserstedt.)
- Impromptus for large Orchestra (1957)
- Die Pfingstgeschichte nach Lukas, Evangelist-scoring for tenor solo, six-part choir, 11 instruments and organ (1963)
- Triplum for 3 Klaviere and Orchestra (1965/6)
- Prismen for flute, oboe, harp, percussion and orchestra (1967)
- Marginalien. Dem Andenken eines guten HundesfFor orchestra (1969)
- Zyklus for cello and chamber orchestra without strings (1970)
- Machaut-Balladen, setting ballads by Guillaume de Machaut for singer and orchestra (1974)
- String Quartet No. 4 (1975)
- Triptychon for orchestra (1977)
- Two string trios (1951, 1983)
- Piano trio (1978)

== Sources ==
- Borio, Gianmario; Danuser, Hermann (1997). Zenit der Moderne: die Internationalen Ferienkurse für Neue Musik Darmstadt 1946–1966: Geschichte und Dokumentation in vier Bänden. Freiburg im Breisgau: Rombach. ISBN 3-7930-9138-4.
- Lindlar, Heinrich (1960). Wolfgang Fortner; eine Monographie. Werkanalysen, Aufsätze, Reden, Offene Briefe, 1950-1959. Rodenkirchen/Rhein: P. J. Tonger. OCLC 1999810.
- Lohrmann, Uwe (1982). "Wolfgang Fortner". Neue Zeitschrift für Musik 143, no. 10:
- Roth, Matthias (2005). "War Wolfgang Fortner ein Nazi?". Jahrbuch Musik in Baden-Württemberg. ISBN 3-89912-082-5.
- Roth, Matthias (2006). "Der Komponist Wolfgang Fortner und sein, Kohlhof Club'". Die Insel im Wald - 300 Jahre Heidelberger Kohlhof. ISBN 3-935992-23-8.
- Roth, Matthias (2008). Ein Rangierbahnhof der Moderne. Der Komponist Wolfgang Fortner und sein Schülerkreis (1931–1986); Erinnerungen, Dokumente, Hintergründe, Porträts. Freiburg im Breisgau: Edition Rombach. ISBN 978-3-7930-9521-7.
- Schipperges, Thomas (1995). "Musik unterm Hakenkreuz – Heidelberg 1933-45". Verführt und verraten: Jugend im Nationalsozialismus: Bruchstücke aus der Region: Kurpfäsisches Museum der Stadt Heidelberg, 8. Mai bis 16. Juli 1995. Heidelberg: Kurpfälzisches Museum Stadt Heidelberg. OCLC 36220656.
- Stephan, Rudolf; Internationales Musikinstitut Darmstadt. (1996). Von Kranichstein zur Gegenwart – 50 Jahre Darmstädter Ferienkurse. Stuttgart: Daco Verlag. ISBN 3-87135-028-1.
- Weber, Brigitta (1995). Wolfgang Fortner und seine Opernkompositionen. Mainz: Schott. ISBN 3-7957-0308-5.
- Weber, Brigitta (2001). "Fortner, Wolfgang". The New Grove Dictionary of Music and Musicians, second edition, edited by Stanley Sadie and John Tyrrell. London: Macmillan Publishers.
