= Selmar Bagge =

German composer, music journalist, and academic

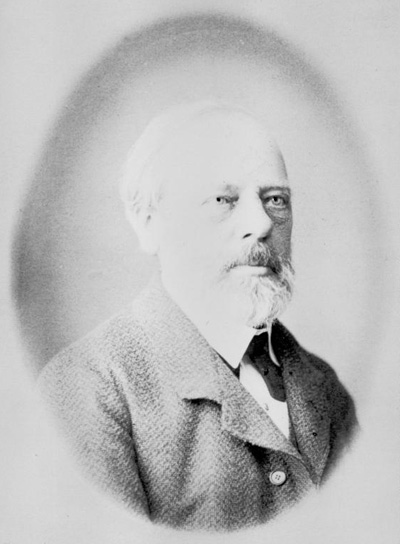
Selmar Bagge

Selmar Bagge (30 June 1823 – 16 July 1896) was a German composer, music journalist and academic.

== Biography ==
Bagge was born in Coburg in 1823; his father Johann Bagge was rector of the Latin school there. In 1837 he went to Prague Conservatory, studying composition with Friedrich Dionys Weber and cello with Johann Hüttner. For two years from 1840 he was first cello in the municipal theatre in Lemberg (present-day Lviv).

He moved to Vienna, where he met the musical circle of Princes Adam Jerzy Czartoryski and Konstanty Adam Czartoryski, and he studied music theory with Simon Sechter. In 1851, through Sechter, he became Professor of Composition at Vienna Conservatory. In 1853 he became organist at the Protestant church in Gumpendorf near Vienna.

He resigned his professorship in 1855. He began to write about music; in 1855 in Monatsschrift für Theater und Musik he wrote articles critical of Vienna Conservatory, later dealing with general musical topics. In 1859 he became editor of Deutsche Musikzeitung, in which he was one of the first in Vienna to promote the music of Schumann and Brahms.

In 1863 he moved to Leipzig, and took over the editorship of the Allgemeine musikalische Zeitung. He left in 1868 to become director of the Allgemeine Musikschule in Basel, where he provided lectures in musicology. He remained there until his death in 1896.

George Grove wrote in A Dictionary of Music and Musicians: "Bagge is a strong conservative and an able writer. Beethoven and Schumann are his models in art, and he has no mercy on those who differ from him.... His music is correct and fluent, but poor in invention and melody."
