= Hilden =

City in North Rhine-Westphalia, Germany

- Town
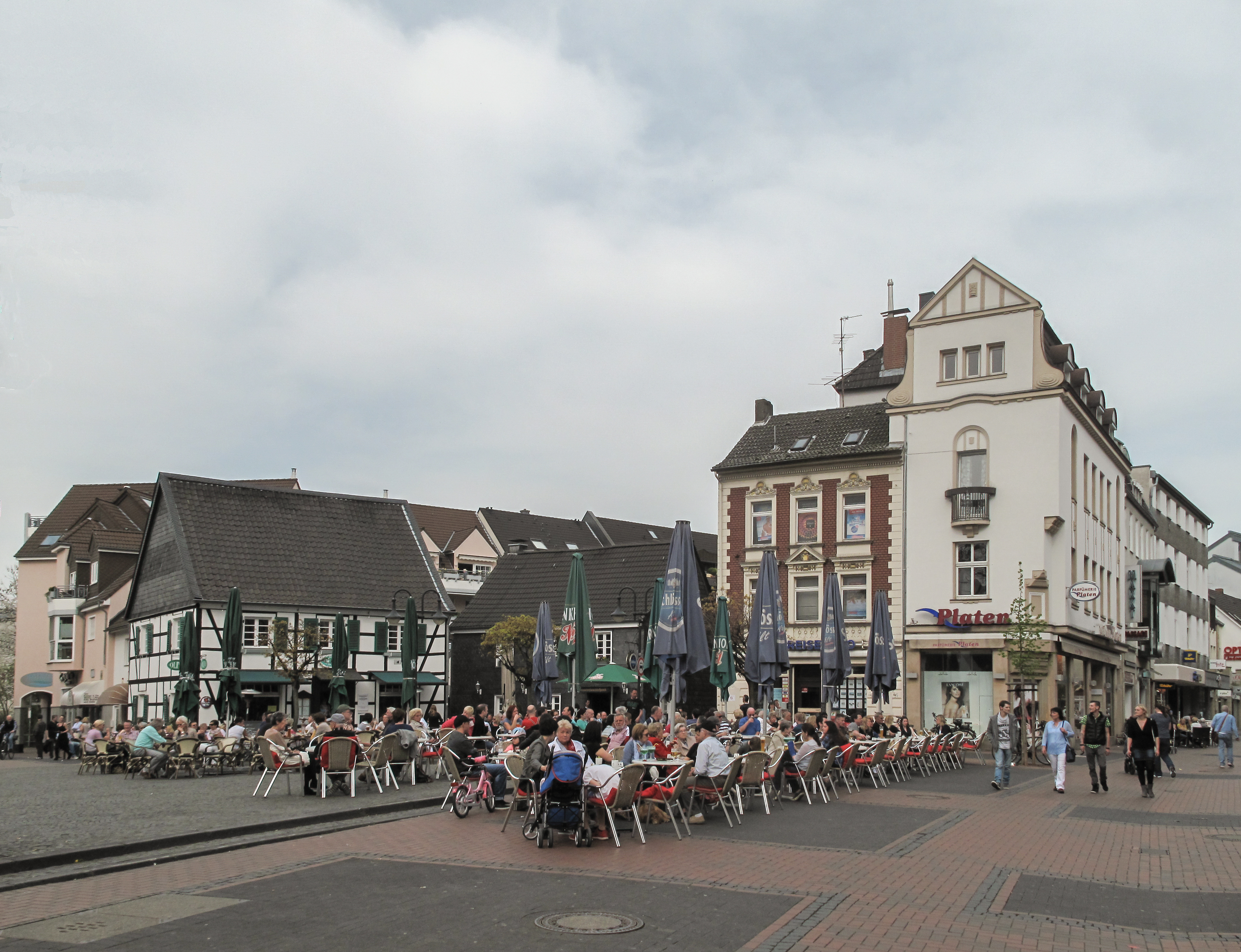

- Coat of arms

- Location of Hilden within Mettmann district
- Interactive map of Hilden
- Location within Germany Location within North Rhine-Westphalia
- Coordinates: 51°10′17″N 6°56′22″E
- Country: Germany
- State: North Rhine-Westphalia
- Admin. region: Düsseldorf
- District: Mettmann

Government
  - Mayor (2020–25): Claus Pommer (Ind.)

Area
  - Total: 25.95 km^{2} (10.02 sq mi)
- Elevation: 50 m (160 ft)

Population (2025-12-31)
  - Total: 54,859
  - Density: 2,114/km^{2} (5,475/sq mi)
- Time zone: UTC+01:00 (CET)
  - Summer (DST): UTC+02:00 (CEST)
- Postal codes: 40721,40723,40724
- Dialling codes: 02103
- Vehicle registration: ME
- Website: www.hilden.de

Hilden (German pronunciation: [ˈhɪldn̩]) is a town in the German state of North Rhine-Westphalia. It is situated in the District of Mettmann, 10 km (6.21 mi) west of Solingen and 15 km (9.32 mi) east of Düsseldorf on the right side of the Rhine. It is a middle sized industrial town with a forest and numerous attractions.

The Mayor is Claus Pommer, who took office in 2020.

== Geography ==
With approx. 55,000 inhabitants, Hilden is the fourth largest city in the District of Mettmann. In contrast to the surrounding cities, it has no suburban districts or incorporated villages. Hilden has a compact urbanized city centre and borders some smaller woods.

== History ==
Hilden was named in written sources already in the 11th century. In the 13th century in the centre of the early settlement a Romanesque church was erected, which during the Reformation became Protestant. Later a second church for Catholics had been built. In the time of industrialization many factories especially in textiles, engineering and painting had been founded. In both World Wars the people of Hilden had many losses, a list of the soldiers' names is written on a memorial. During the Nazi rule Jews and opponents of the regime have been persecuted. In the factories forced labourers, allegedly 3000, have been employed.

In 1945 American troops, then units of the British Army of the Rhine had occupied the town, stationed in the local barracks erected in 1937. The relationship between the population and the British soldiers were good especially after Germany's accession to NATO in May 1955, when former adversaries became allies. The initiative of the regiment to get in touch with local citizens led to the twin partnership Hilden - Warrington (1968), to school exchanges and various contacts between people. In March 1968 the British troops left Hilden, having been replaced by German military units which took over the barracks.

In the aftermath of the War refugees from East Germany found a new home in Hilden nearly doubling its population. In 1956 the Council of Hilden granted patronage to the association of refugees from the town and district of Wohlau, Lower Silesia. They held several meetings in Hilden with more than 1000 former Wohlau citizens having received refuge in various parts of Germany.

== Population ==
Historical population

Year	Pop.	±% p.a.
1965	44,256	—
1970	50,092	+2.51%
1975	52,235	+0.84%
1980	53,333	+0.42%
1985	53,405	+0.03%
1990	54,782	+0.51%
1995	55,086	+0.11%

Year	Pop.	±% p.a.
2000	56,412	+0.48%
2005	56,545	+0.05%
2010	55,441	−0.39%
2015	55,185	−0.09%
2020	55,274	+0.03%
2025	54,859	−0.15%

Source: Landesdatabank Nordrhein-Westfalen

Since the 1960s thousands of foreign migrant workers were employed in various industrial sections. An economical boom in the following decades contributed to further expansion of the town.

- Largest groups of foreign residents
- Nationality: Population (2013)
Turkey	962
Italy	694
Poland	514
Portugal	428
Morocco	381

== Politics ==
Since World War II, Hilden had six mayors:

- Robert Gies – a Social Democrat and Mayor (1952–1969)
- Ellen Wiederhold – a Christian Democrat, the first female and longest ruling Mayor (1969–1994)
- Günter Scheib – a Social Democrat and Mayor (1994–2009)
- Horst Thiele – a Social Democrat and Mayor (2009–2014)
- Birgit Alkenings – a Social Democrat and Mayor (2014–2020)
- Claus Pommer – non-party and Mayor (2020–present)

The current City Council, elected in 2009, consists of 40 members: 13 Christian Democrats, 13 Social Democrats, 6 Liberals, 4 Greens, 4 Civic Action and 4 Independents. In summer 2010 one member left the Christian Democrat faction and two members left the Liberals founding their own faction. Missing a formal coalition the Council rules with changing majorities.

== Economy ==
Hilden was once home to textile factories, a big paint enterprise, pharmaceutical and metallurgic companies. After the economic crisis in the 1980s many of these companies have been closed. Flourishing companies now include the German headquarters of 3M and Qiagen, as well as many other businesses and enterprises from the technology and logistics sector.

== Transportation ==
Until the 1960s Hilden had an old fashioned tram, that connected the city in three directions with Düsseldorf-Benrath, Solingen-Ohligs and Wuppertal-Vohwinkel. It was nearly a tourist attraction, as it was one of the few trams that operated on metre gauge track. Meanwhile, the trams have been replaced by buses.

Hilden station has local trains operating to Düsseldorf, Solingen and Dortmund. This service is now operated as line S 1 of the Rhine-Ruhr S-Bahn, stopping at several newly built stations, including Hilden Süd station. Line S 1 continues past Düsseldorf to Düsseldorf Airport station and the Ruhr area.

Hilden is also accessible by the nearby intersecting freeways A3, A59 and A46.

Within Hilden, residential speed limits were reduced to 30 km/h (18.6 mph) in 1992 to encourage cycling. The main street in the center became a pedestrian zone.

== Festivities ==
- carnival parade (in February)
- annual "Hildener Jazztage" - Hilden jazz days (in May/June)
- Schützenfest - festivity of St. Sebastian's brotherhood (in June)
- exhibition of fire fighters' brigade (August/September)
- Day of German Reunification (on October 3)
- Christmas market (in December)

== Notable people ==
- Wilhelm Fabry (1560–1634), founder of the scientific surgery
- Max Volmer (1885–1965), physical chemist
- Christian Petzold (born 1960), movie director
- Michael Tarnat (born 1969), footballer
- Blumio (born 1985), rapper
- Julian Hanses (born 1997), racing driver

== Twin towns – sister cities ==
Hilden is twinned with:

- Warrington, England, United Kingdom (1968)
- Nové Město nad Metují, Czech Republic (1989)

== Gallery ==
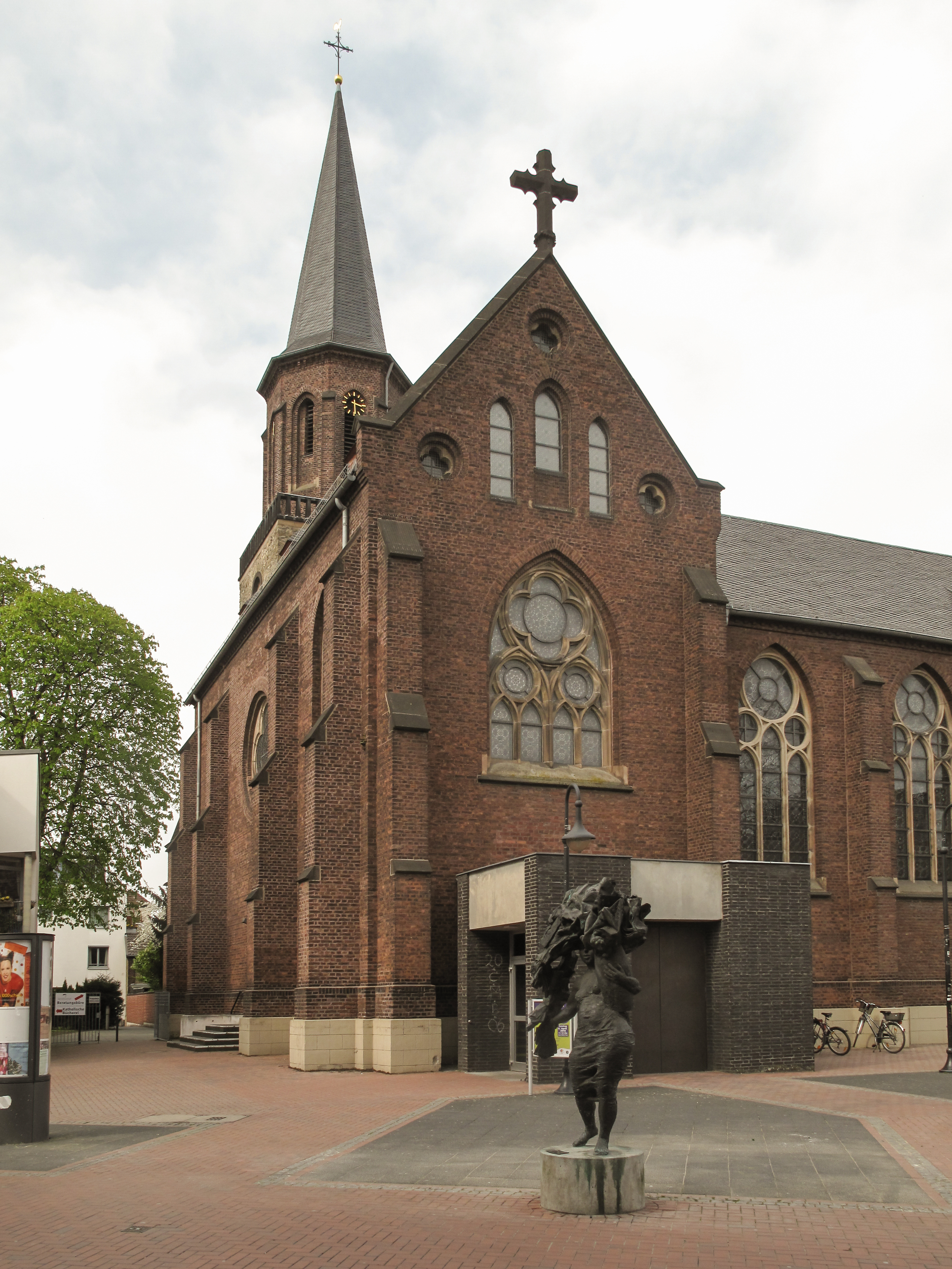
Church of Saint Jacobus

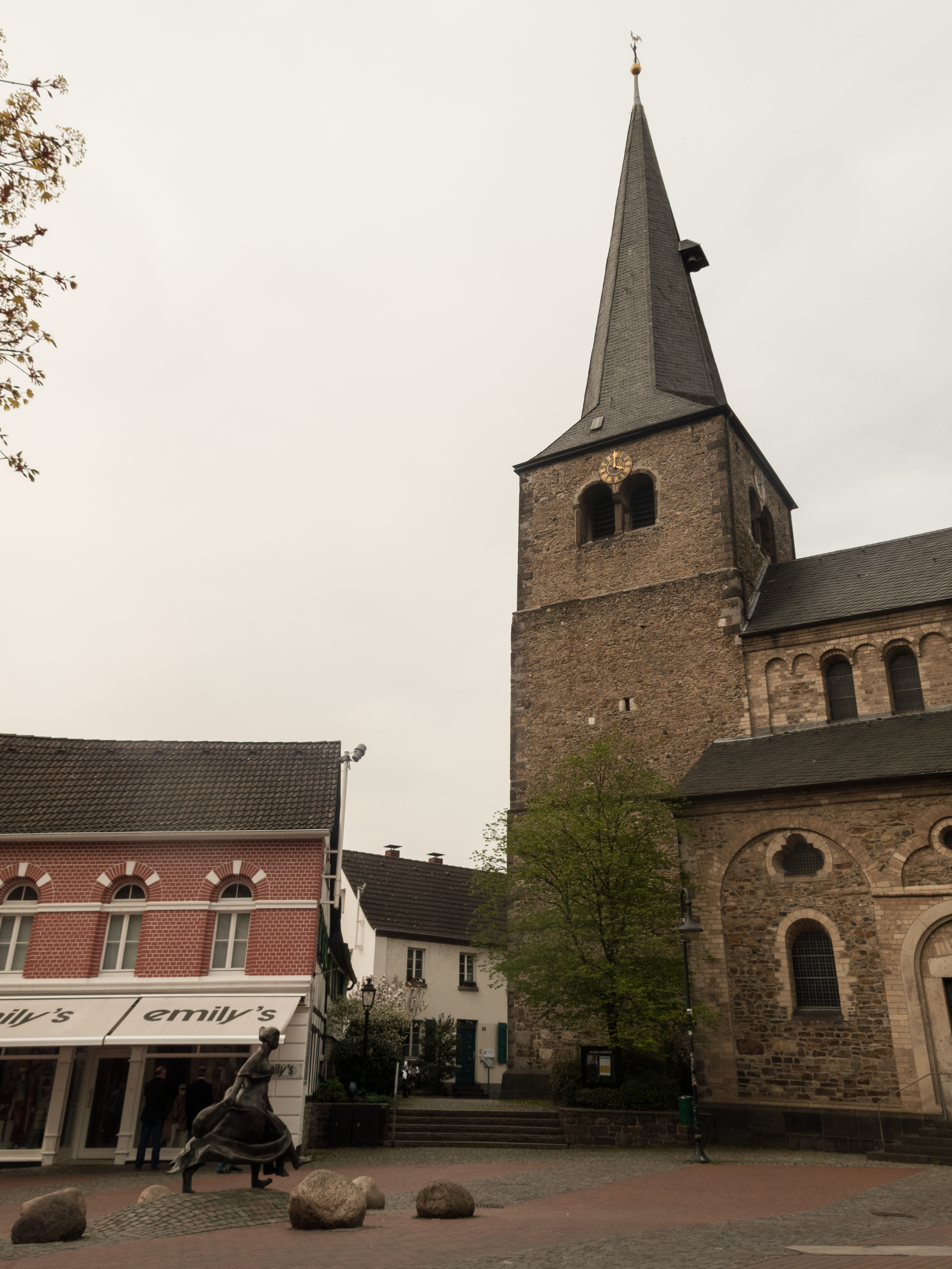
Reformations Church

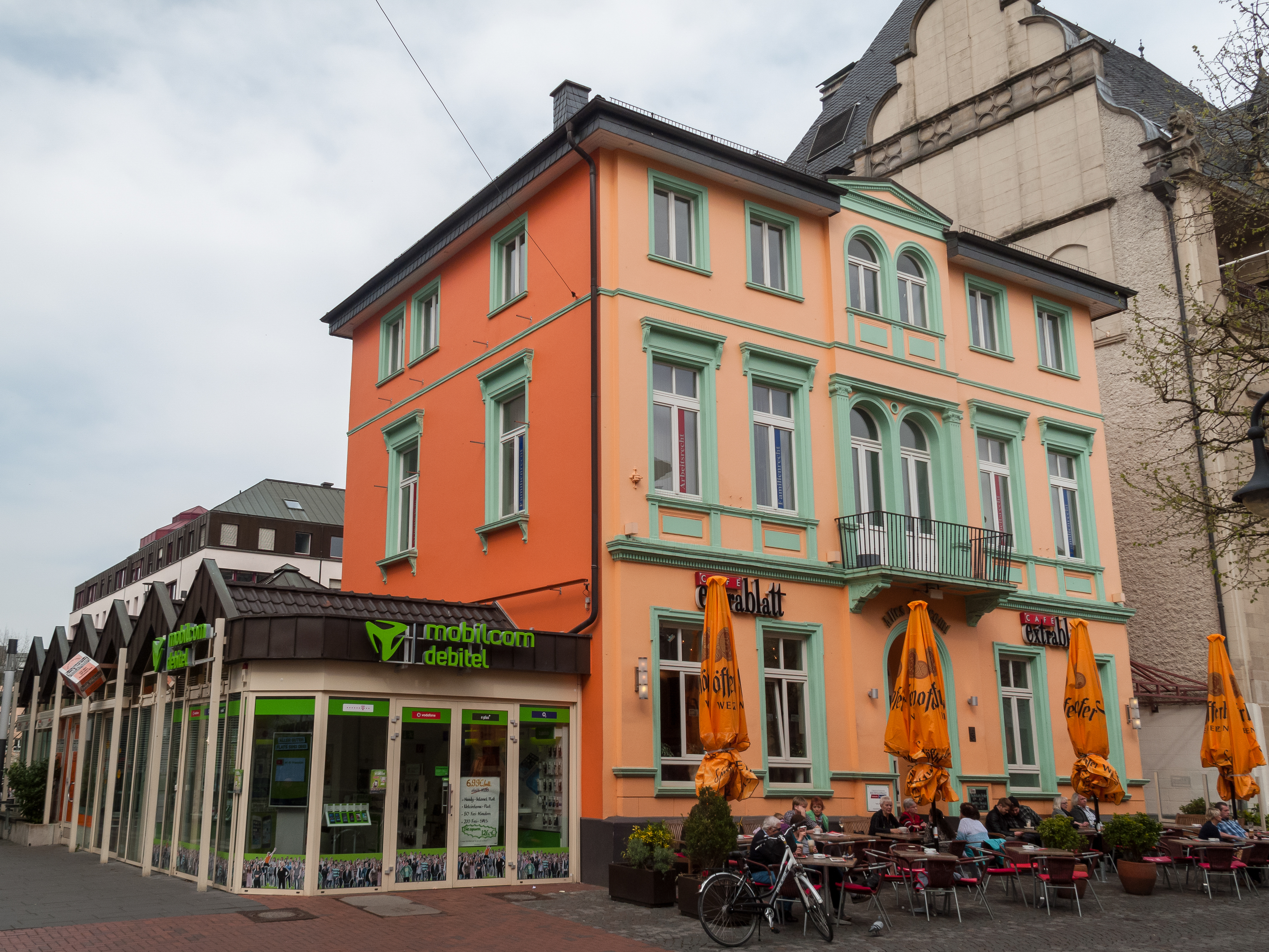
Bar in Mittelstrasse

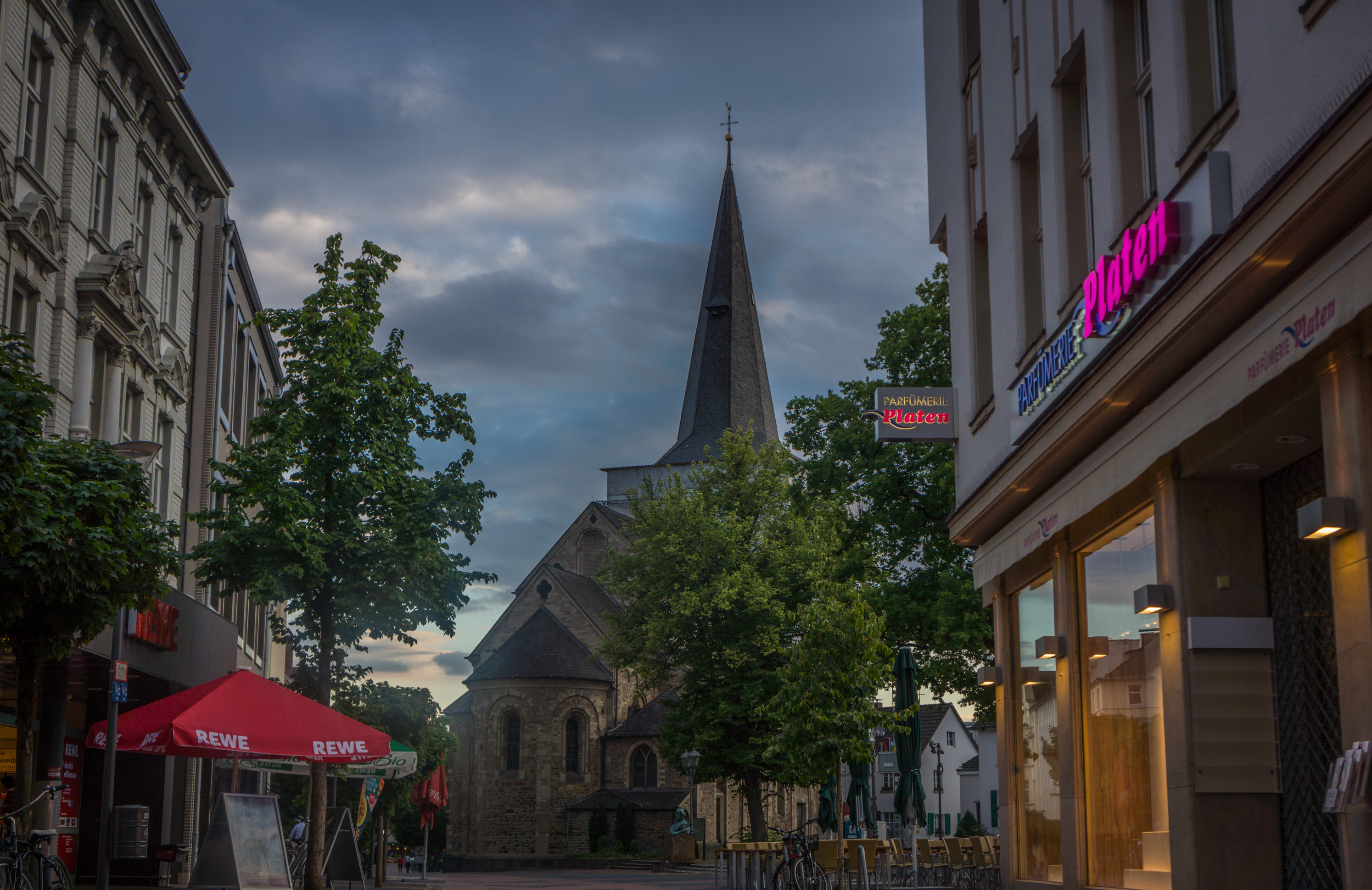
The pedestrian zone

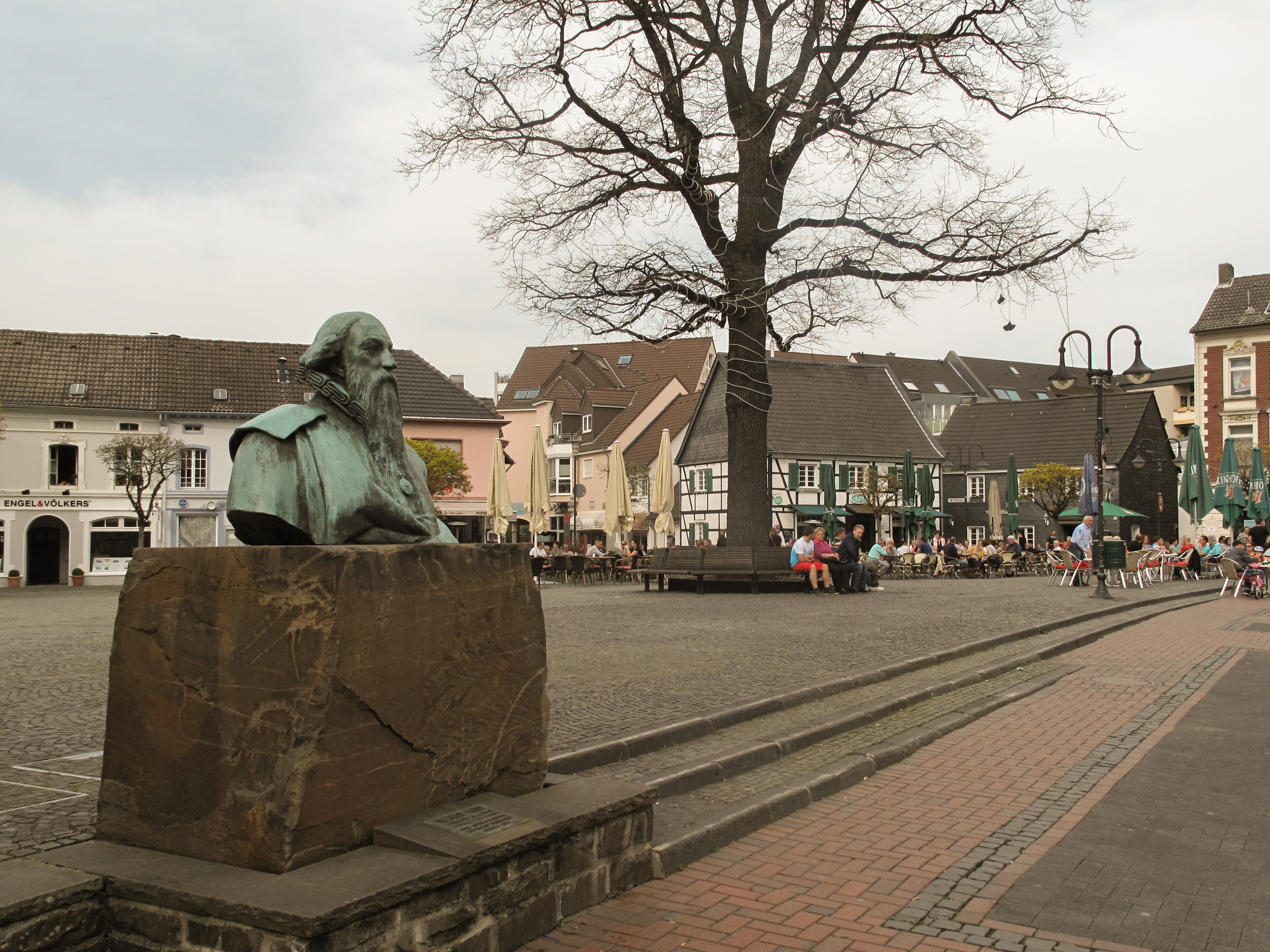
Bust of 17th century surgeon Wilhelm Fabry at market place
