= William B. Murray =

American opera singer (1935–2019)

William B. Murray (March 13, 1935 – April 7, 2019) was an American opera baritone, who performed in Europe from 1960 to 1990. According to the New Grove Dictionary of Opera he was "a stylish singer and a fine actor" who "excels in dramatic and character roles."

== Life and career ==
Murray was born in Schenectady, New York, United States, and graduated from Adelphi University in New York City. and studied voice with Karin Branzell in New York, Luigi Ricci and Giuseppe Bertelli in Italy and with Hertha Kalcher in Stuttgart, Germany. He made his debut in Wolf-Ferrari's Il Segreto di Susanna in Spoleto, Italy. He went on to have a major career in Germany, where he made his debut in the role of Scarpia in Puccini's Tosca at the Landestheater Detmold. He soon moved on to the opera houses in Braunschweig and Mannheim before joining the Bayerische Staatsoper in Munich and, in 1971, the Deutsche Oper Berlin. It was marked that he "convinced vocally and in the expression"

He was a frequent guest in most of the leading opera houses in Europe, including the Vienna State Opera (Don Giovanni, Tannhäuser), Teatro alla Scala, Milano (Italian premiere of Luigi Dallapiccola's Ulisse), the Grand Theatre in Geneva, Switzerland (Rigoletto), Oper Hamburg, Germany (Rigoletto), Bonn Opera (Die Meistersinger von Nürnberg), Amsterdam (Rigoletto, Dallapiccola's Ulisse), Teatro Bellini in Catania, Italy (Ernani), Marseille, France (Die Meistersinger von Nürnberg), Opera Torino, Italy (Die Meistersinger von Nürnberg). He also appeared in the US at the New York City Opera and at the Houston Grand Opera.

Among his signature roles were the baritone leads in the Verdi operas Rigoletto, Trovatore, La Traviata, La Forza del Destino, Don Carlos, Falstaff, but he was also famous for his portrayals of such different roles as Figaro (Mozart's Le Nozze di Figaro) and Don Giovanni, Wolfram von Eschenbach (Wagner's Tannhäuser), and Scarpia (Tosca) and Michele (Puccini's Il Tabarro).

Murray was also part of a number of world premiers, among them Sim Tjong by Isang Yun (Munich 1972), Love's Labour's Lost by Nicolai Nabokov (Brussels 1973), Elisabeth Tudor by Wolfgang Fortner in Berlin 1972, and Oedipus by Wolfgang Rihm (Berlin 1987). He was able to work personally with many composers on their works, e.g. Frances Burt, Isang Yun, Marcel Mihalovici, Stephen Burton, Luigi Dallopicola, Nicolas Nabokov, Hans Werner Henze and Carl Orff.

He was also a well known concert soloist with such orchestras as the Berlin Philharmonic, Munich Philharmonic, Symphony Orchestra of the Bayerischer Rundfunk (Munich), Buffalo Symphony, Syracuse Symphony, and has worked with conductors as Claudio Abbado, Lorin Maazel, Giuseppe Sinopoli, Heinrich Hollreiser, Christoph von Dohnanyi, Christoph Eschenbach, Christopher Keene, and Jesus Lopez Cobos.

Murray was awarded the honorary title of Kammersänger by the Berlin Senate in January 1980 for exceptional artistic accomplishments. In 1987 he joined the voice faculty of the Universität der Künste in Berlin and became a professor of voice at Rice University, Houston in 1992.

Murray lived in Sparrowbush, New York. He was married to Nancy Lee Murray and had three children: John Horton Murray, Chris Murray, and Judith Leora Murray. He died on April 7, 2019, at the age of 84.

== Awards ==
- Kammersänger des Landes Berlin (1980)

== Discography ==
- Felix Mendelssohn-Bartholdy: Die Hochzeit des Camacho
- Hans Werner Henze: Die Bassariden
- Richard Strauss: Salome
- Erich Wolfgang Korngold: Die tote Stadt

== Bibliography ==
- The St. James Opera Encyclopedia ISBN 0-7876-1035-6
- International Who's Who in Classical Music 2010, 26th Edition, ISBN 9781857435535
- The Complete Dictionary of Opera & Operetta, ISBN 978-0517091562
- The New Grove Dictionary of Opera
