= Simone Zgraggen =

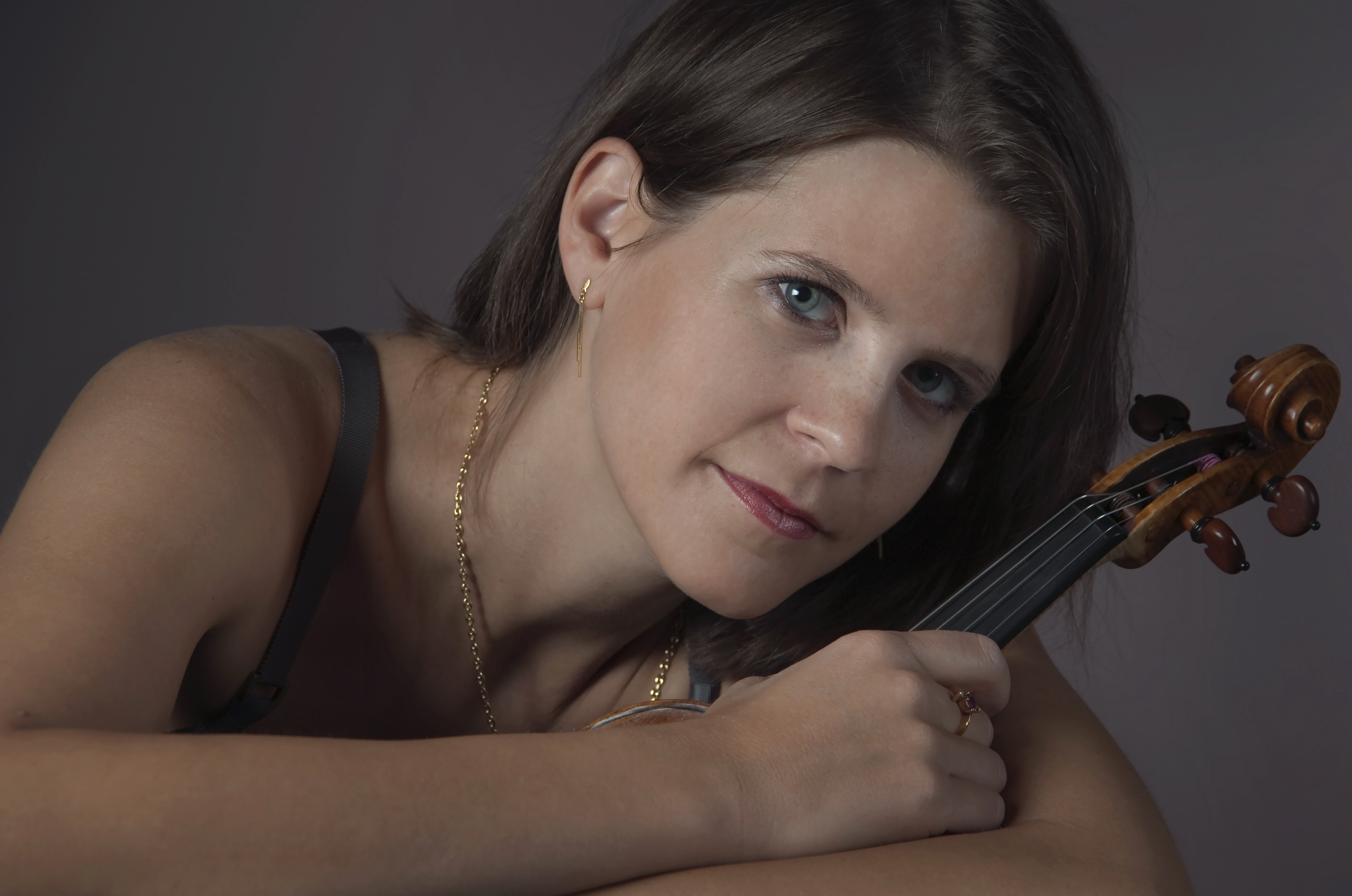

Background information
- Born: 8 August 1975 (age 50); Altdorf, Switzerland
- Genres: Classical
- Occupation: Violinist
- Instrument: Violin
- Years active: 1988–present

Simone Zgraggen (born 8 August 1975 in Altdorf, Switzerland) is a Swiss violinist and professor at Freiburg University of Music.

== Career ==
Simone Zgraggen began playing the violin at the age of five. She studied from 1991 to 1994 at Lucerne University of Music under Alexander van Wijnkoop, from 1994 to 1995 at Basel Conservatory also under van Wijnkoop and from 1996 to 2002 at Karlsruhe University of Music under Ulf Hoelscher. She received all degrees with highest honors.

In 2012 she was appointed to a professorship for violin at Freiburg University of Music after having taught violin classes at Zurich Conservatory from 2001 to 2012 and violin methodology at Karlsruhe University of Music from 2001 to 2004.

Simone Zgraggen is concertmaster of the Basel Sinfonietta and the Zuger Sinfonietta.

== Instrument ==
Simone Zgraggen plays the Stradivarius violin Golden Bell of 1668. She uses bows made by Louis Henri Gillet, Alfred Lamy, Claude Thomassin and a baroque bow built by Carsten G. Löschmann.

== Awards and recognition ==
- Heinrich Danioth Arts and Culture Foundation: First Prize (2006)
- Felix Mendelssohn Bartholdy Conservatory Competition: First Prize (2002)
- Carl Flesch Academy Baden-Baden, Germany: Brahms Prize and Lions Award (2001)
- Meadowmount School of Music: Shar Award (1999)

== Discography ==
- Naxos (8.551474)

Dieter Ammann: Unbalanced Instability (with Baldur Brönnimann und Basel Sinfonietta)

- Claves Records (Claves 50–2503)

Othmar Schoeck: The 3 Violin Sonatas (with Ulrich Koella)

- Genuin classics (GEN 86521) Review

Luigi Boccherini: String Quintet in E major, Op. 13 No. 5 (with Schubert-Quintett)
Franz Schubert: String Quintet in C major, D 956 - Op. post. 163 (with Schubert-Quintett)

- Bella Musica (BM 31.2345)

Johannes Brahms: Concerto for violin, cello and orchestra in A minor, Op. 102 (with Grigory Alumyan and the Baden-Baden Philharmonic under Werner Stiefel)
Johann Sebastian Bach: Partita in D minor for solo violin BWV 1004
