= Cécile Verny Quartet =

German-French jazz band in Freiburg, Germany

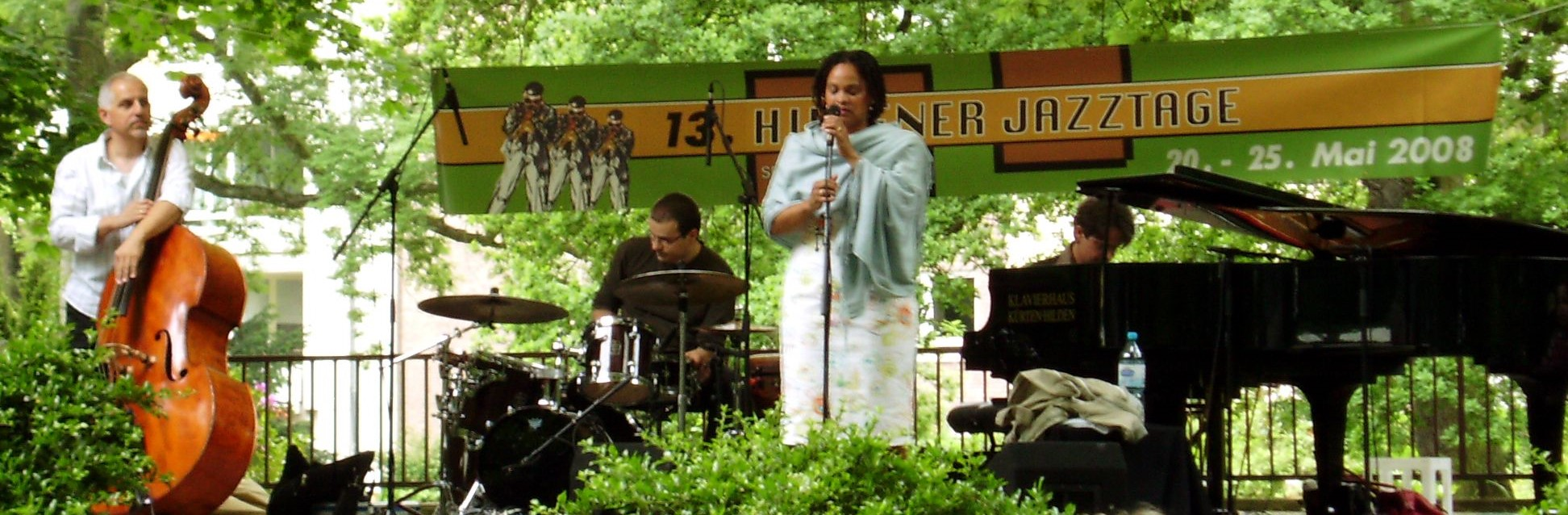

Background information
- Origin: Freiburg im Breisgau, Germany
- Genres: jazz, jazz fusion
- Years active: 1989 - present
- Label: Minor Music
- Members: Cécile Verny, Bernd Heitzler, Andreas Erchinger, Lars Binder
- Website: www.cvq.de

The Cécile Verny Quartet is a German-French jazz band, named after their lead singer Cécile Verny. Active since 1992, they have been distinguished with several awards, including the Grand prix du Jury of the French festival Jazz à Juan and the German Music Critics Award.

== History ==
The band's lead singer and founder is the vocalist and songwriter Cécile Verny, who was born in the Ivory Coast and grew up in France. She is accompanied by Bernd Heitzler on bass, Andreas Erchinger on keyboards and Torsten Krill, later followed by Lars Binder, on drums. Since their beginnings in 1989, the band has been based in Freiburg im Breisgau.

Apart from mainstream jazz, other important sources for their music are French chanson, scat singing, rock, blues and African music. On their album European Songbook, Verny and her sidemen played arrangements by Michael Gibbs and Carinne Bonnefoy.

Among other awards, the Cécile Verny Quartet has been distinguished by the Grand prix du Jury of the French festival Jazz à Juan and nominated as one of the best jazz albums of 2006 by the German Music Critics Award.

In addition to Germany and France, the quartet has received attention in international jazz circles, including a review in DownBeat magazine. Touring for the German cultural centres Goethe-Institut, the quartet was also invited for concerts in Morocco, Kenya, South Africa and Sudan.

== Discography ==
- Oazoo (1992)
- Patchwork (1995)
- Expressive Impressionen (1995)
- Coquelicot – melodie de vie (1997)
- Got a Ticket (1998)
- Métisse (1999)
- Kekeli (2002)
- Cécile Verny Quartet – live in Antibes (DVD, 2004)
- The Bitter and the Sweet (2006)
- Amoureuse (2008)
- Keep some secrets within (2010)
- Fear & Faith (2013)
- Memory Lane (2014)
- Of Moons and Dreams (2019)

== Awards and distinctions ==
- Award of the Concours Vocal du Festival de Crest, France (1992)
- Festival Award, international Zelt-Musik-Festivals in Freiburg im Breisgau (1995)
- Grand Prix, Festival Jazz à Juan (2003)
- Best album list 2006 by German Music Critics Award for The Bitter and The Sweet
- Scholarship by Reinhold-Schneider-Preis, Freiburg im Breisgau (2012)
