= Karl Komma =

Karl Michael Komma (24 December 1913, Asch, Austria-Hungary (now Aš, Czech Republic) – 23 September 2012, Memmingen, Germany) was a German composer and music-publicist.

== Life ==
Komma studied at the German Music Academy in Prague with George Szell, Fidelio F. Finke and Theodor Veidl before he went to Heidelberg in 1934 to study music with Heinrich Besseler. Komma graduated in 1936 with a dissertation on Jan Zach. During this time he also conducted composition studies with Wolfgang Fortner, who became a conductor for Komma (Donaueschingen, premiere of the "German Dances" for string orchestra, 1939).

From 1940 to 1945, Komma was the head of the music school in what is now Liberec, and was awarded for his achievements. He also appeared in 1935 with a cantata for a NSDStB-Kundgebung in appearance, composed by a jubilant chorus for the annexation of Czechoslovakia by Hitler in 1938 and came with a pamphlet against Gustav Mahler in 1939 (Fred Prieberg in Musik im NS-Staat), 1982, and Macht und Musik, 1992). In 1952, he received the Nordgau Culture Prize of the city of Amberg in the category of music.

Komma, from 1954 to 1989, taught music history, music theory and composition at the Musikhochschule Stuttgart and worked as a music journalist and composer with extensive oeuvre and was still active even in old age. In 1981 he became a full member of the Sudeten German Academy of Sciences and Arts in the Arts and Sciences.

== Works (selection) ==
- Zwei Konzerte für Klavier und Orchester
- Psalmkantate
- Matthäus-Passion für Chor a cappella (1965)
- Lamento di Tristano für Orchester
- Triptychon Christ ist erstanden
- Lasso-Fantasie für Orgel
- Te Deum für Orgel
- Streichquartett
- Lieder nach Hölderlin, Celan und Härtling
- Hommage à Händel für Chor a cappella
- Die Hütte Gottes, Oratorium für Soli, Chor und Orchester (1977 uraufgeführt durch den Oratorienchor Ulm unter der Leitung von Edgar Rabsch anlässlich der 600-Jahr-Feier der Grundsteinlegung des Ulmer Münsters)
- Vier Stücke für Kammerorchester (1987, dem Reutlinger Jugendorchester (heute Junge Sinfonie Reutlingen) gewidmet)
- Elegie und Scherzo für Englisch-Horn und Orchester (1999, Rainer M. Schmid gewidmet)
- Drei Duos für Cello und Fagott (1986)
- Sapphische Strophen für Fagott, Violoncello und Klavier (1981, Friedrich Edelmann und Rebecca Rust gewidmet)
- Japanisch-deutsche Jahreszeiten 1995/96, Haikus für Fagott, Cello und Klavier
- Tanz des Grossen Friedens, Concerto grosso für Cello, Fagott, Klavier und Streichorchester (1993, gewidmet Seiner Kaiserlichen Majestät dem Kaiser Akihito von Japan und Seiner Kaiserlichen Majestät der Kaiserin Michiko von Japan)
- Choralsonate (3 Sätze) für Trompete oder Posaune und Orgel

== Publications ==
- Johann Zach und die tschechischen Musiker im deutschen Umbruch des 18. Jahrhunderts. Heidelberg, Phil. Diss., 1939. - Würzburg, 1938, 124 S. (Auch beim Bärenreiter-Verlag, Kassel, als: Heidelberger Studien zur Musikwissenschaft. Band 7)
- Das böhmische Musikantentum (1960)
- Musikgeschichte in Bildern (1961)
- Lieder und Gesänge nach Friedrich Hölderlin (1967)
- Lebenserinnerungen Lebenswege (1999)

== Work (selections) ==
- Literature by and about Karl Komma in the German National Library catalogue
- "Prof. Dr. Karl-Michael Komma". Württembergische Philharmonie Reutlingen (in German). 2007. Archived from the original on 2007-10-06.
- Homepage mit Werkverzeichnis
- Burkhardt, Otto Paul (2012-09-26). "Impulse fürs Musikleben. Der Komponist Karl Michael Komma ist mit 98 verstorben". Südwest Presse (in German). Archived from the original on 2012-11-11.
