= Hochschule für Musik Karlsruhe =

College of music in Karlsruhe

Hochschule für Musik
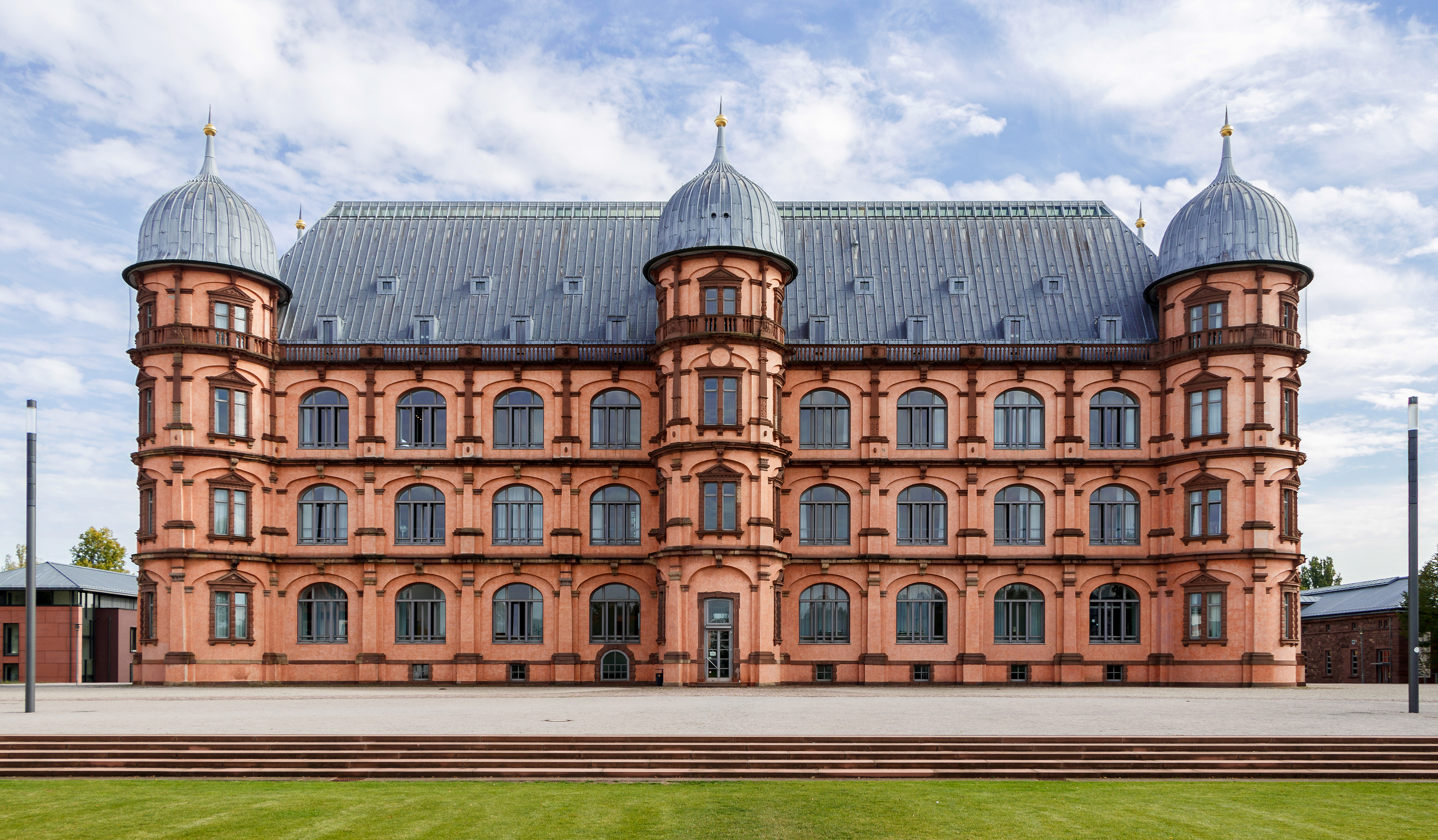
- Schloss Gottesaue, the main building of the Hochschule
- Type: Public
- Established: 1971
- Principal: Hartmut Höll
- Faculty: 200
- Students: 560
- Location: Karlsruhe, Baden-Württemberg, Germany; 49°00′17″N 8°25′38″E
- Campus: Urban
- Website: www.hfm-karlsruhe.de

The Hochschule für Musik Karlsruhe (University of Music Karlsruhe) is a college of music in Karlsruhe, Germany. Originally the Baden Conservatory of Music, it was elevated to a Hochschule under the direction of Franz Philipp, who led the school from 1924 to 1942.

== Studies ==
The Hochschule für Musik Karlsruhe offers tuition in voice, orchestral instruments, piano, composition, music theory, musicology, music informatics and music journalism. The academic degrees go from Bachelors to Artists Diplomas.

== Notable faculty ==
- Hanno Müller-Brachmann (born 1970), voice
- Wolfgang Meyer (1954–2019), clarinet
- Wolfgang Rihm (1952–2024), composition
- Elina Vähälä (born 1975), violin

== Notable alumni ==
- Tanja Ariane Baumgartner
- Clara Mathilda Faisst (1872–1948)
- Tarja Turunen (born 1977)
- Simone Zgraggen (born 1975)
- Jörg Widmann (born 1973)
- Matthias Manasi

== See also ==
- Music schools in Germany
