= Carl Seemann =

German pianist

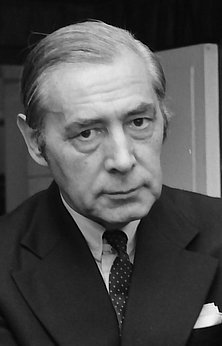
Image of Seemann

Carl Seemann (8 May 1910 − 26 November 1983) was a German church musician, pianist, piano teacher and director of the Musikhochschule Freiburg.

== Life ==
Born in Bremen, after the Abitur Seemann initially vacillated between studying theology and music. He decided to study church music in Leipzig. His teachers were Karl Straube, Günther Ramin, Kurt Thomas and Carl Adolf Martienssen. After his exams, Seemann worked as organist in Flensburg and Verden. From 1935 he devoted himself mainly to his career as a pianist and to teaching - Seemann subsequently held professorships and master classes in Kiel, Strasbourg and Freiburg im Breisgau. From 1964 to 1974 he was head of the local state music academy.

Many recordings, but especially the duo performances with the violinist Wolfgang Schneiderhan, made Seemann one of the greats of post-war German musical life. Nevertheless, public attention turned to the increasingly dominant Russian master pianists such as Emil Gilels, Vladimir Horowitz and Svjatoslav Richter. This was possibly also a consequence of Seemann's rather matter-of-fact style of interpretation, which refrained from virtuoso tricks.

In 1999, the re-release of various Deutsche Grammophon recordings under the title The Legacy led to a kind of "Seemann's renaissance". In the supplement of the cassette the critic Joachim Kaiser, in whose book Great Pianists in our Time (Piper, Munich 1965; new edition 1996, ISBN 3-492-22376-1) Seemann did not appear, deals in an essay with Seemann's art.

His assistant in Freiburg was Fany Solter. In his master class studied, among others, the conductor Hortense von Gelmini.

Seemann's nephew Hellmut Seemann heads the Klassik Stiftung Weimar.

Seemann died in Freiburg im Breisgau at the age of 73.

== Literature ==
- Helmuth Hopf and Rudolf Weber: Interview mit Carl Seemann. In ZfMP (Zeitschrift für Musikpädagogik). Gustav Bosse Verlag, Regensburg. 4. Jahrgang 1979, issue 9, ISSN 0341-2830. pp. 3–15.

== Discography ==
- Carl Seemann plays Stravinsky.
- Carl Seemann plays Bach. recordings 1953/1958. DG
- Carl Seemann : das Vermächtnis.
- J.S. Bach: Die Partiten BWV 825–830. Orfeo
- Mozart: Sämtliche Sonaten für Klavier solo. DG Original Masters
- Zehn Meisterklavierabende, Saison 1962 / 3. Konzert, 23 November 1962 : Carl Seemann.
- Brahms: Violinsonaten und F-A-E-Sonate mit Wolfgang Schneiderhan. DG
- Carl Seemann – Das Vermächtnis (Werke von Bach, Haydn, Mozart, Beethoven, Schumann, Brahms, Debussy und Prokofjew). DG
- Konzert der Schwetzinger Festspiele 1964 mit Wolfgang Schneiderhan (Sonaten von Bach, Mozart, Beethoven und Schubert). Orfeo
- Ludwig van Beethoven: Sämtliche Violinsonaten mit Wolfgang Schneiderhan. DG
- Wolfgang Amadeus Mozart: Sämtliche Violinsonaten mit Wolfgang Schneiderhan. DG
- Discography on Universal.
- List of 29 Recordings on the German National Library.

== Awards ==
- 1978: Reinhold-Schneider-Preis of the city of Freiburg for Music.
