= City of Basel Music Academy =

Swiss institution for music education

Coordinates: 47.5552°N 7.5861°E

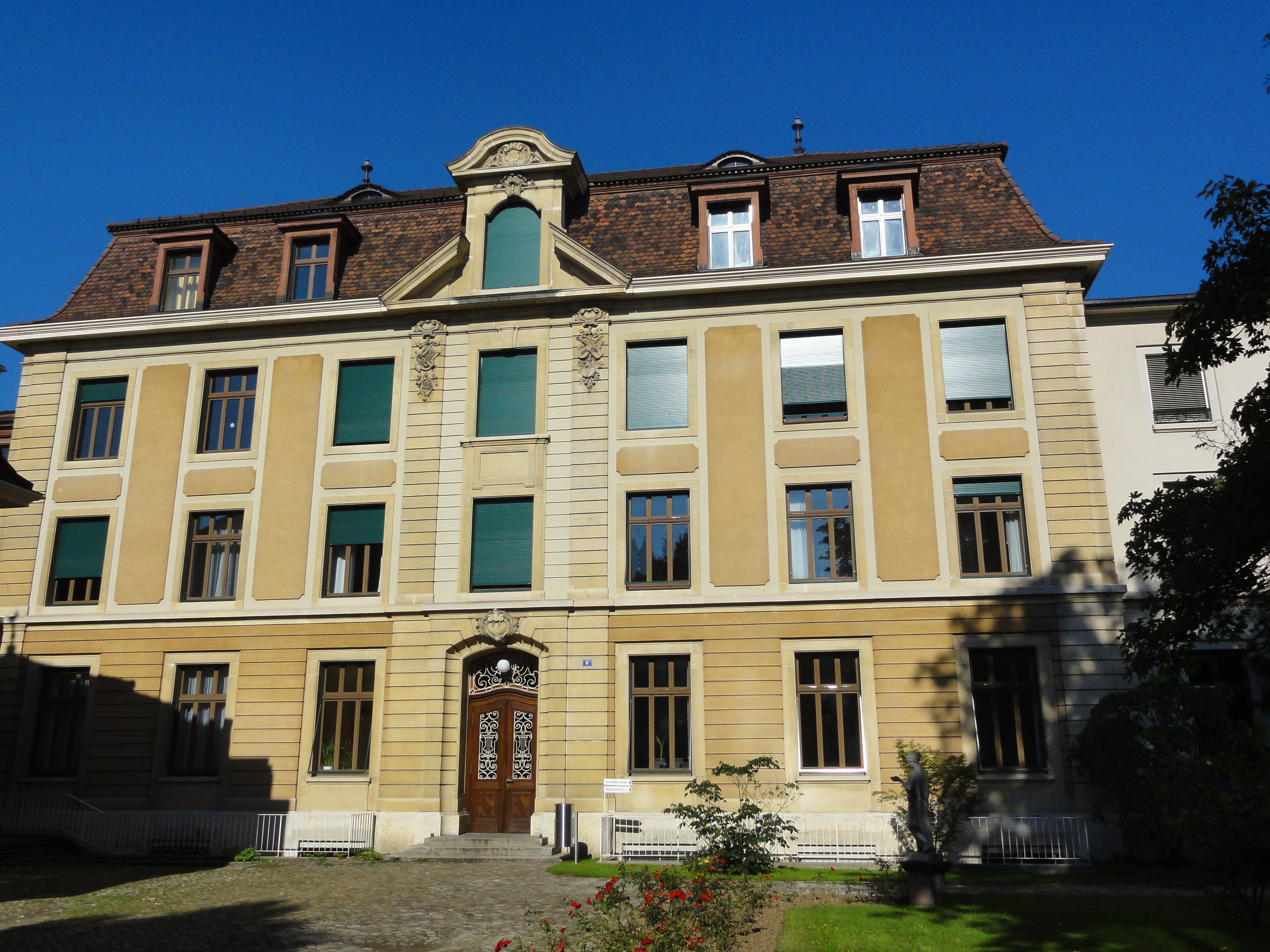
Main building

The City of Basel Music Academy (German: Musik-Akademie der Stadt Basel) is an institution for music education in Basel, Switzerland, comprising a music school, a college of music and a center for early music research and performance.

== History ==
The origins of the City of Basel Music Academy go back to 8 December 1867, when philanthropist Johann Jakob Schäublin-Vögtlin founded a music school (Allgemeine Musikschule) in Basel with support from the Gesellschaft für das Gute und Gemeinnützige (GGG). Selmar Bagge was the school's first director (1868-1896). The composer Hans Huber was director from 1896 to 1918, and in 1905 he oversaw the addition of a college of music (Hochschule für Musik Basel), the first conservatory in German-speaking Switzerland. Conductor Hans Münch served as the school's director from 1935–1947.

In 1954 the school incorporated the Schola Cantorum Basiliensis, one of the world's leading early music institutions. Together the three institutions formed the City of Basel Music Academy.

In 1999 the Academy achieved the status of a university of applied sciences, or Fachhochschule, and in October of that year the vocational department of the Basel Jazz School was incorporated into the Academy's college of music.

In 2001 the Academy added a fourth institution, the Basic Course in Music (Musikalischer Grundkurs).

In 2008 the Academy became an affiliate of the regional University of Applied Sciences Northwest Switzerland (Fachhochschule Nordwestschweiz).

== Notable alumni ==
- Arie Vardi
- Nicolas Altstaedt
- Sol Gabetta
- Endre Granat
- Werner Güra
- Márton Illés
- Martina Janková
- Nuria Rial
- Michel Roth
- Jan Schultsz
- Simone Zgraggen
