= Zsigmond Szathmáry =

Hungarian musician

- Born: 28 April 1939 (age 87)
- Occupations: organist, pianist, composer, and conductor
- Instrument: Organ

Zsigmond Szathmáry (born 28 April 1939) is a Hungarian organist, pianist, composer, and conductor.

== Life ==
Szathmáry was born in Hódmezővásárhely, near Szeged. He studied composition with Ferenc Szabó and organ with Ferenc Gergely at the Franz Liszt Music Academy in Budapest from 1958 to 1963. He pursued post-graduate instrumental education at first in Vienna with Alois Forer and—after he moved to Germany—from 1964 at the Frankfurt Musikhochschule with Helmut Walcha. Parallel to this he participated from 1964 to 1967 in the Cologne Courses for New Music, studying composition with Henri Pousseur and Karlheinz Stockhausen, and attended the Darmstädter Internationale Ferienkurse für Neue Musik in 1964 and 1965, studying with György Ligeti.

Szathmáry worked at first as Kantor and organist in Hamburg-Wellingsbüttel and from 1976 to 1978 at the Bremen Cathedral. In 1978 he accepted the position of professor of organ at the Hochschule für Musik Freiburg. Besides guest professorships in Tokyo and Seoul, and organ courses (inter. al., as lecturer at the Summer Academy for Organists in Haarlem, the Darmstädter Internationale Ferienkurse für Neue Musik, as well as at numerous conservatories and universities in Europe, North America, Japan, and Korea), Szathmáry has developed a worldwide career not only as an organist and pianist, but also as a conductor.

His artistic activities have been rewarded with numerous prizes and honors: in 1960 he won first prize in the Budapest Organ Competition, in 1972 he was awarded the Bach-Prize Stipend from the city of Hamburg, in 1973 was inducted into the Freie Akademie der Künste in Hamburg, and in 1987 received the Franz Liszt Badge of the Hungarian Liszt Memorial Committee (A Magyar Köztársaság Liszt Ferenc Emlékbizottsága) and the Pro Artibus award from the Artisjus Foundation. Since 2009 he has been an honorary member of the Széchenyi Academy of Letters and Arts (Hungarian Academy of Sciences). Since 2007 Szathmáry has been titulary organist at St. Peter's in Cologne.

As a performer, Szathmáry's repertoire encompasses organ music from the 17th century up to the present. Open to musical experiment and technical innovations, in particular within the field of new music, he has earned a considerable reputation: In close co-operation with composers like Péter Eötvös, Vinko Globokar, Heinz Holliger, György Ligeti, Wolfgang Rihm, Peter Ruzicka, Dieter Schnebel, and Hans Zender, he has to date performed about 120 premières and enthusiastically advocates avant-garde organ music (amongst others: Luciano Berio, John Cage, Roman Haubenstock-Ramati, Maki Ishii, Mauricio Kagel, György Kurtág, Giacinto Scelsi).

As a composer Szathmáry pursues an undogmatic pluralism in the application of contemporary compositional procedures, putting a special emphasis on making instrumental tone colors unfamiliar through the use of unusual playing techniques as well as live-electronic and electroacoustic means.

== Compositions (selective list) ==
=== Vocal music ===
- Drei Lieder auf Gedichte von Endre Ady, for voice and piano
- Disperazione (text: Anne Frank, biblical), for soprano, baritone, flute, oboe, horn, trombone, piano, harpsichord, and 3 percussionists (1970)
- Halotti beszéd (Funeral Oration) (anonymous 12th-century Hungarian text), cantata for alto, baritone, mixed choir, and orchestra (2003–2004)
- Missa da pacem—Kyrie, Gloria, for mixed choir
- A Psalm for alto, violin, and organ
- Fukushima Requiem (in remembrance of the dead of the Japan tsunami and nuclear disaster in 2011) for mixed choir, barytone solo, wind quintet, organ and percussion (2012)
- Ich habe meine Augen... (Nicolaus Lenau) for soprano and organ (2019)

=== Orchestral music ===
- Five Movements, for organ and chamber orchestra (1963)
- Three Pieces for Orchestra, (2001–2002)
- Concerto for organ and orchestra (2017)

=== Chamber music ===
- Alpha for flute, clarinet, trumpet, violin, viola, cello and piano (1968)
- String Quartet (1970)
- Monolog for flute and live-electronics (1971)
- Con-tact-versation for violin and tape (1972)
- Cadenza con ostinati for violin and organ, or violin and small orchestra (1994)
- Kupferstich (Copperplate Engraving) for 4 trombones (1999)
- Discourse for violin and trombone (2002, rev. 2005)
- Quadriga for 4 percussions (2007)
- Cimbolin for cimbalom and violin (2009)
- Motus animi for clarinet, bass clarinet and bassoon (2009)
- Rhetorica for violin (2010)
- Sense of Rhythm for organ and percussion (2011)
- A Grand Canyon Scenery for clarinet and string orchestra (2011)
- Capriccio sopra la battaglia for percussion solo (2012)
- Dies irae to the memory of the Second World War - for organ and percussion (2015)
- Processional for 4 brasses (2 tr. in C, 2 trombones) organ and timpani (2017)
- Triptychon for violin and percussion (1 player) (2019)
- Klang-Bilder (Soundscapes) for percussion ensemble (4 players) (2019)

=== Keyboard music ===
- Drei Klavierstücke for piano
- Dialogue for organ (1971)
- Strophen for organ and tape (1988, rev. 2001),
- Hommage à B-A-C-H for large organ (1994)
- Feuertaufe for organ (2004)
- Moving Colours for organ (2006)
- Vibro (Droning) for organ (2007)
- Janus for organ (2008)
- Leichte Brise – grosser Orkan (Gentle breeze – huge hurricane) for organ (2011)
- Mosaikbilder for piano (2012)
- Bremer Dommusik for two organs (2013)
- Sonido Iberico for historic Spanish organ (2014)
- Mors et vita for organ (2015)
- Toccata breve for organ (2019)
- Silberklänge for organ (2019)
- Aus der Tiefe... for cello and organ (2019)

== Discography as performer (selective) ==
- Organ Improvisations. Zsigmond Szathmáry: Omaggio a György Ligeti; Michael Vetter: Der Kreis; John Cage: Music for Carillon No. 5; Shinichi Matsushita: Konzentration; Roman Haubenstock-Ramati: Ohne Titel.Wergo CD 60119-50 (1983). Reissued in 1996 under the same catalog number as Music and Graphic: Organ Improvisations.
- Liszt Organ Music, vol. 1. EMI-German Harmonia Mundi. 2-CD 7 47533 8. (1987)
- J. S. Bach: Orgelwerke. RCA Classics Classical Navigator 74321 29235 2 (1995 [recorded 1978 & 1979])
- György Ligeti Edition 6: Keyboard Works. Sony 62307 (1997)
- György Ligeti: Continuum/Zehn Stücke/Artikulation/Glissandi/Etudes [Etudes for Organ, nos. 1 & 2]. Wergo 60161 (1988)
- Antonín Dvořák: Symphony No. 9, trans. organ by Szathmáry. Bis 1168 (2001)
- Hungarian Contemporary Organ Music, works by Hollós, Durkó, Szathmáry [Strophen], Kurtág, Sári, and Láng. Hungaroton 31858 (2000)
- Roland Breitenfeld : Annunciazione, for organ, percussion and live-electronics, after the picture of the same title by Leonardo da Vinci. Zsigmond Szathmáry, organ; Olaf Tzschoppe, percussion). Roland Breitenfeld CD RB14 (2005)
- Helmut Lachenmann: Kontrakadenz; Klangschatten-mein Saitenspiel; Fassade. Peter Roggenkamp, Zsigmond Szathmáry, Gerhard Gregor (piano), SWR Radio-Sinfonieorchester Stuttgart; NDR-Sinfonieorchester; SWR Sinfonieorchester Baden-Baden und Freiburg, Michael Gielen. Kairos 0012232 (2006)
- Formen in der Luft – contemporary music for violin and organ (Are Musik, 2007)
- entgrenzt - unbounded – Works for organ and percussion by Schlünz, Bíró, Breitenfeld, Eckert, Pröve (edition zeitklang, 2007)
- Works by Zsigmond Szathmáry – Janus, Three Pieces for Orchestra, Discourse, Funeral Oration, Vibro (Hungaroton Classic, 2009)
- Kunst-Station St. Peter, Köln – Works for organ by Szathmáry, Bares, Kagel, Láng, Maiguashca, Cage (edition zeitklang 50052)
- Zsigmond Szathmáry: Organ works Performers: Martin Schmeding – organ, Anikó Katharina Szathmáry – violin, Olaf Tzschoppe – percussion, Wolfgang Kogert – organ, Zsigmond Szathmáry – organ (Cybele-records: 2SACD 061807)

== Sources ==
- Wienke, Gerhard. 2001. "Szathmáry, Zsigmond". The New Grove Dictionary of Music and Musicians, second edition, edited by Stanley Sadie and John Tyrrell. London: Macmillan Publishers.
