= Darmstadt School =

Group of composers

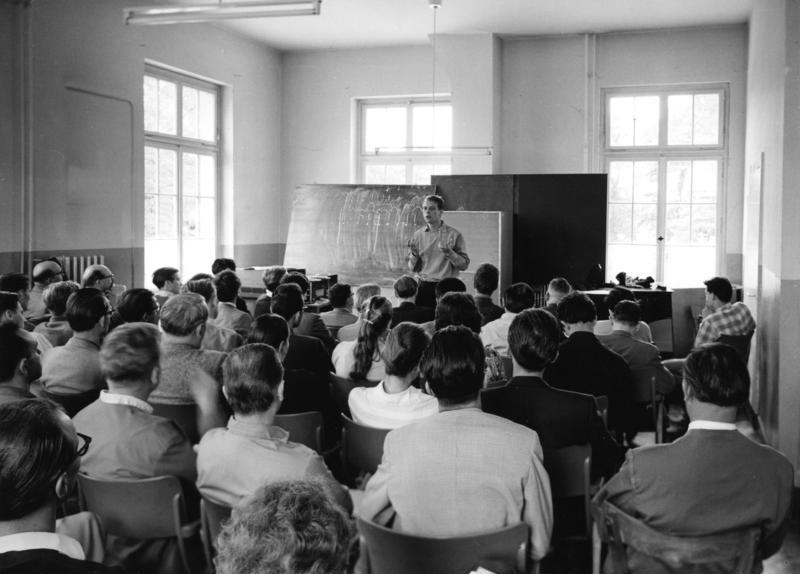
July 1957, 12th International Vacation Courses for New Music, Seminar: Karlheinz Stockhausen

Darmstadt School refers to a group of composers who were associated with the Darmstadt International Summer Courses for New Music (Darmstädter Ferienkurse) from the early 1950s to the early 1960s in Darmstadt, Germany, and who shared some aesthetic attitudes. Initially, this included only Pierre Boulez, Bruno Maderna, Luigi Nono, and Karlheinz Stockhausen, but others came to be added, in various ways. The term does not refer to an educational institution.

Initiated in 1946 by Wolfgang Steinecke, the Darmstädter Ferienkurse, held annually until 1970 and subsequently every two years, encompass the teaching of both composition and interpretation and also include premières of new works. After Steinecke's death in 1961, the courses were run by Ernst Thomas (1962–81), Friedrich Ferdinand Hommel (1981–94), Solf Schaefer (1995–2009), and Thomas Schäfer (2009– ). Thanks to these courses, Darmstadt is now a major centre of modern music, particularly for German composers, and has been referred to as "the world epicenter for exploratory musical work, which was driven by a younger generation mostly engaged with new sound technology".

== History ==
Coined by Luigi Nono in his 1958 lecture "Die Entwicklung der Reihentechnik",), Darmstadt School describes the uncompromisingly serial music written by composers such as Pierre Boulez, Bruno Maderna, Karlheinz Stockhausen (the three composers Nono specifically names in his lecture, along with himself), Luciano Berio, Aldo Clementi, Franco Donatoni, Niccolò Castiglioni, Franco Evangelisti, Karel Goeyvaerts, Mauricio Kagel, Gottfried Michael Koenig, Giacomo Manzoni, and Henri Pousseur from 1951 to 1961, and even composers who never actually attended Darmstadt, such as Jean Barraqué and Iannis Xenakis. Two years later the Darmstadt School effectively dissolved due to musical differences, expressed once again by Nono in his 1960 Darmstadt lecture "Text—Musik—Gesang". Nevertheless, composers active at Darmstadt in the early 1960s under Steinecke's successor Ernst Thomas are sometimes included by extension—Helmut Lachenmann, for example—and although he was only at Darmstadt before 1950, Olivier Messiaen is also sometimes included because of the influence his music had on the later Darmstadt composers. However, according to one source, although Messiaen paid "a brief visit" to the courses in 1949, "he neither taught students nor lectured" there.

== Background, influences ==
Composers such as Boulez, Stockhausen, and Nono were writing their music in the aftermath of World War II, during which many composers, such as Richard Strauss, had had their music politicised by the Third Reich. Boulez was taken to task by French critics for associating with Darmstadt, and especially for first publishing his book Penser la musique d'aujourd'hui in German, the language of the recent enemies of France, falsely associating Boulez's prose with the perverted language of the Nazis. All this despite the fact that Boulez never set German texts in his vocal music, choosing for Le marteau sans maître, for example, poems by René Char who, during the war, had been a member of the French Resistance and a Maquis leader in the Basses-Alpes.

Key influences on the Darmstadt School were the works of Webern and Varèse—who visited Darmstadt only once, in 1950, when Nono met him—and Olivier Messiaen's "Mode de valeurs et d'intensités" (from the Quatre études de rythme).

== Criticism ==
Almost from the outset, the phrase Darmstadt School was used as a belittling term by commentators like Kurt Honolka (a 1962 article is quoted in Boehmer 1987, 43) to describe any music written in an uncompromising style, despite the presence of many composers and schools which forbid serialism and modernism.

During the late 1950s and early 1960s the courses were charged with a perceived lack of interest on the part of some of its zealot followers in any music not matching the uncompromisingly modern views of Pierre Boulez—the "party subservience" of the "clique orthodoxy" of a "sect", in the words of Dr. Kurt Honolka, written in 1962 in an effort to "make the public believe that the most advanced music of the day was no more than a fancy cooked up by a bunch of aberrant conspirators conniving at war against music proper". This led to the use of the phrase 'Darmstadt School' (coined originally in 1957 by Luigi Nono to describe the serial music being written at that time by himself and composers such as Boulez, Maderna, Stockhausen, Berio, and Pousseur) as a pejorative term, implying a "mathematical," rule-based music.

Composer Hans Werner Henze, whose music was regularly performed at Darmstadt in the 1950s, reacted against the Darmstadt School ideologies, particularly the way in which (according to him) young composers were forced either to write in total dodecaphony or be ridiculed or ignored. In his collected writings, Henze recalls student composers rewriting their works on the train to Darmstadt in order to comply with Boulez's expectations.

One of the leading figures of the Darmstadt School itself, Franco Evangelisti, was also outspoken in his criticism of the dogmatic "orthodoxy" of certain zealot disciples, labelling them the "Dodecaphonic police".

A self-declared member of the school, Konrad Boehmer states:

There never was, or has been anything like a 'serial doctrine', an iron law to which all who seek to enter that small chosen band of conspirators must of necessity submit. Nor am I, for one, familiar with one Ferienwoche schedule, let alone concert programme, which features seriality as the dominant doctrine of the early fifties. Besides, one might ask, what species of seriality is supposed to have reached such pre-eminence? It did, after all, vary from composer to composer and anyone with ears to hear with should still be able to deduce this from the compositions of that era.
