= Carl Ueter =

German composer

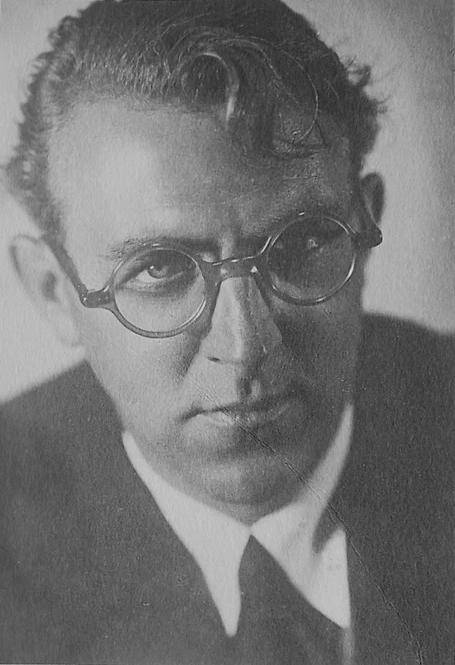
- Carl Ueter, lobbycard from the première of the opera Die Erzgräber, 1937

Background information
- Born: 18 January 1900; Münster, German Empire
- Died: 30 October 1985 (aged 85) Bad Krozingen, West Germany

Carl Ueter (sometimes also Karl Ueter; 18 January 1900 – 30 September 1985) was a German composer of classical music. From 1950 to his retirement in 1965 he was a professor at the Hochschule für Musik Freiburg.

== Life and work ==
Ueter was born in Münster, where he studied Christian music at the Bischöfliche Kirchenmusikschule (Episcopal Church Music School) from 1915 to 1918. During these years he was also organist at different churches in Münster. He worked as a teacher for Gregorian musicology, music theory and violin at the Bischöfliche Kirchenmusikschule after the completion of his studies, but attended the composition class of Fritz Volbach at the University of Münster further on.

In the year 1921 Carl Ueter was accepted as a student of the composition master class of Franz Schreker at the Hochschule für Musik in Berlin and among his fellow students were Alois Haba, Berthold Goldschmidt, Max Brand and Jerzy Fitelberg. Further studies included Instrumental Music with Emil Nikolaus von Reznicek as well as courses with Max Seiffert and Curt Sachs.

In 1923 after his studies Carl Ueter took the position of a lecturer at the Musikhochschule Mannheim and became later in the same year répétiteur at the Stadttheater Münster. Still in 1923 the music director of the Stadttheater Münster, Ewald Lindemann, followed an appointment as a music director at the Stadttheater Freiburg im Breisgau and took Carl Ueter with him. Until the outbreak of World War I in 1939 Carl Ueter took the position of the 1. Kapellmeister at the Städtische Bühnen Freiburg.

Between 1940 and 1944 Carl Ueter fulfilled military service and got into US war captivity. Until 1945 he was arrested at the prisoner-of-war camp at Bad Aibling.

In 1946 the Hochschule für Musik Freiburg was founded and Carl Ueter took a position as a lecturer there from the very beginning. In 1950 he was appointed professor and until his retirement in 1965 he held masterclasses in conducting, as well as courses in counterpoint and score reading. Among his most notable students are Hans Zender, Werner Jacob, Gerbert Mutter, Isaac Karabtchevsky, Günther Wich, Wolfgang Gayler and David Machado.

Additionally he directed the Opera School and the Music School Orchestra. In this position Carl Ueter conducted the first public opera performance of Fritz Wunderlich in 1954.

Beside his work as a teacher Carl Ueter always composed music of all genres of classical music including chamber and vocal music, but also operas and orchestral compositions. He died in Bad Krozingen, aged 85.

== Compositions (extracts) ==
=== Opera ===
- Die Erzgräber (1937, world premiere on 21.10.1937 in Freiburg im Breisgau)
- Imperator Caesar (1941)

=== Orchestra ===
- Symphony d-minor
- Symphony f-sharp minor (world premiere on 09.01.1939 with the Gewandhausorchester Leipzig and Franz Konwitschny)
- Concerto for violins, cellos and orchestra

=== Chamber music ===
- Sonata for piano and cello (1921)
- Trio for violin, viola and cello op.10 (1925)
- Trio No.3 for 2 violins and cello (1927)
- Sonata No.1 for flute and piano (1946)
- Sonata for violin solo (1928)
- Trio for violin, viola and cello (1946)
- Toccata for piano (1932)
- 3 Pieces for violin and piano (1947)
- 5 small pieces for piano (1947)
- Suite for flute and piano (1947)
- Presto possibile, for piano
- 3 Pieces for string quartet (1952)
- Trio for clarinet, horn and bassoon Funksuite (1952)

=== Vocal music ===
- Chamber-cantata "Der kleine Tod" for baritone, cello and piano op.36 No.1 (on words by Rainer Maria Rilke) (1934)
- Chamber-cantata "Liebe zu Gott" for alto, violin and piano op. 36 No.2 (on words by Rainer Maria Rilke) (1934)
- Romanic Chants for low voice and piano (1947)
- Four Chants on poems by Hölderlin, for low voice, viola and piano (1946)

== Literature ==
- Hanns Musch: Dirigent – Komponist – Universelle Persönlichkeit. Zum Tode von Carl Ueter. 1985.
- Friderun Ueter: Lebenslauf Carl Ueter. In the archive of Fred Prieberg at the Musikwissenschaftliches Institut of the Universität Kiel, 1997.
- Friderun Ueter: Werkverzeichnis Carl Ueter. In the archive of Fred Prieberg at the Musikwissenschaftliches Institut of the Universität Kiel, 1997.
