= Ronald Hamilton =

American tenor

Ronald Hamilton is an American tenor who was born in Hamilton, Ohio, to a musical family. He began studying medicine, but decided on a singing career.

In 1972 he was engaged by the opera in Ulm. In 1975 he signed a contract with Dortmund and, in 1977, with the Deutsche Oper am Rhein. In the 1985-86 season he performed the role of Alwa in Lulu. He made his Metropolitan Opera debut in this role in 1988, opposite Catherine Malfitano and Tatiana Troyanos, in John Dexter's production conducted by James Levine.

Hamilton appeared regularly with the companies of Leipzig, Dresden, Buenos Aires, and Berlin (Staatsoper) in the roles of Florestan (Fidelio), Bacchus (Ariadne auf Naxos), Lohengrin, and Walther von Stolzing (Die Meistersinger von Nürnberg), appearing as Stolzing in a Staatsoper tour of Japan. In 1988-89 and in 1989-90, he regularly appeared at the Deutsche Oper am Rhein (Der fliegende Holländer, Der Freischütz, Oberon, Lohengrin, and Die Meistersinger). Also in his répertoire are the roles of Tristan in Tristan und Isolde, Aegisth in Elektra, the Kaiser in Die Frau ohne Schatten, and the Leper in Saint François d'Assise.

Hamilton made his Théâtre Royal de la Monnaie debut in 1988, in Lulu. He then appeared in the role of Skuratov in From the House of the Dead. In 1990 he sang the important role of St Simeon Stylites in Hans Zender's Stephen Climax. At the Salzburg Festival in 1990 he sang Orpheus in Ernst Krenek's Orpheus und Eurydice with Dunja Vejzovic.

Some of his recordings are: Orpheus und Eurydice (of Krenek, 1990) and Stephen Climax (with Dale Duesing, conducted by Sylvain Cambreling, 1990) and, on DVD, Wozzeck (as the Drum-Major, opposite Duesing, 1996).

== Sources ==
- The Metropolitan Opera Encyclopedia, edited by David Hamilton, Simon & Schuster, 1987. ISBN 0-671-61732-X
- Program notes to Stephen Climax, La Monnaie, 1990.
- Liner notes to Orpheus und Eurydice, ORFEO International, 2016.
