= Werner Jacob =

German organist, composer and academic

- Born: 4 March 1938; Mengersgereuth, Thuringia
- Died: 23 May 2006 (aged 68); Nuremberg
- Education: Musikhochschule Freiburg
- Occupations: Organist; Composer; Academic
- Organizations: St. Sebald, Nuremberg; State University of Music and Performing Arts Stuttgart
- Awards: Order of Merit of Germany

Werner Jacob (4 March 1938 – 23 May 2006) was a German organist, composer and academic.

== Career ==
Werner Fritz Hermann Herbert Jacob was born in Mengersgereuth, Thuringia. He studied at the Musikhochschule Freiburg to 1961, organ with Walter Kraft, harpsichord, composition with Wolfgang Fortner, and conducting with Carl Ueter. He studied organ also privately with Anton Nowakowski.

Jacob was the church musician at St. Sebald in Nuremberg from 1969 to 1991. He was from 1985 to 2003 the artistic director of the Internationale Orgelwoche Nürnberg (ION, International week of organ music).

Jacob was professor of artistic organ playing (Künstlerisches Orgelspiel) at the Hochschule für Musik und Darstellende Kunst Stuttgart from 1976 to 1998. He was a composer in many genres. A symphony in five movements was unfinished when he died in Nuremberg.

== Awards ==
Jacob was awarded the Preis der Stadt Nürnberg in 1983. He received in 1993 the Wolfram-von-Eschenbach-Preis, and in 2003 Order of Merit of the Federal Republic of Germany.

== Compositions ==
- Fantasie, Adagio und Epilog
- Improviation sur E.B. (Ernst Bloch) (1970)
- Metamorphosen über Themen aus Max Regers op.135b (1975)
- Cinque Pezzi sacri
- Suscipe verbum (1996) for horn in F and orgel after a responsorium of the "Maulbronn-Lichtentahler Antiphonale"
- ...sine nomine super nominam...I, Fantasia per organo, timpani e altri strumenti a percussione (1985)
- Quartet for oboe, clarinet, horn and bassoon (1960)
- De visione resurrectionis for mixed choir, baritone solo, two groups of percussion and organ (1966)
- Telos nomou for spreaker and instruments
- Babel for speaker, five soloists and mixed choir
- Canticum II – Canticum Canticorum (Song of Songs) for soloists, choir and instrumentalists
- Canticum III – Canticum Caritatis "Wenn ich mit Menschen und Engelszungen redete" for soprano, two gongs and tamtam (1991)

== Recordings ==
- Johann Sebastian Bach, Das Orgelwerk (complete organ works), Emi-Classics
- Max Reger, Die großen Orgelwerke, Emi-Classics
- Orgelmusik der Familie Bach, Wagnerorgel im Dom zu Brandenburg, ETERNA 8 26 869, 1977
