= Mathieu Lange =

German conductor

Mathieu Lange ( 28 January 1905 – 25 May 1992) was a German musician, conductor and from 1952 to 1973 director of the Sing-Akademie zu Berlin. He hadn't gone by his first name Carl since 1950.

== Life and career ==
Born in Düren, Lange comes from a family of musicians and theatres in Rhineland. He gained his first experience as a theatre Kapellmeister at the Cologne Opera and in Münster and then came to Göttingen as Generalmusikdirektor. From there he went to Hanover as opera director and general music director until the Opera house was destroyed by bombs. After the war, he started again as general music director at the Orangerie (Darmstadt), the alternative accommodation of the Staatstheater Darmstadt, whose house had been destroyed during the war.

Lang was already found of selecting forgotten valuable works for his performances. In Göttingen these were among others Scarlatti's Il trionfo dell'onore (for Germany the first performance of a Scarlatti opera), as well as Monteverdi's Il combattimento di Tancredi e Clorinda (German first performance) and - also an investigation of Lange - Cherubini's opera Démophoon.

Together with Wolfgang Steinecke, Lange played a decisive role in the establishment of the Darmstädter Ferienkurse which was completely destroyed by war in 1945. As musical director for opera, symphony and choir concerts, he was highly respected.

In 1948 Walter Felsenstein invited him to the Komische Oper Berlin in East Berlin. By 1941/42 Berlin's Deutsche Oper Berlin had already engaged him for guest performances.

In 1950, Lange was appointed director of the Sing-Akademie zu Berlin as successor of Georg Schumann. He first appeared on the conductor's podium there on 20 November 1949 for the Brahms Requiem. (Georg Schumann was acting director until his death in 1952).

In Berlin, Lange devoted himself to other musical tasks in addition to his intensive work with the Sing-Akademie: In the Tribune he performed Stravinsky's L'Histoire du soldat in a remarkable series of more than 60 performances at the end of 1950; in 1951 Boris Blacher's Romeo and Juliet was heard in the same theatre and one year later the premiere of Wolfgang Fortner's pantomime The Widow of Ephesus. In the Berlin Festival Weeks he brought out Claudio Monteverdi's Marienvesper as a German premiere in 1952, and in 1953, L'incoronazione di Poppea in the Hebbel-Theater. In the Berliner Festwochen he performed - a small sensation - previously unknown works by 13-year-old Felix Mendelssohn Bartholdy which he had discovered.

Lange was married to the actress Elli Hall. He died in Bochum at age 87.

=== Work as director of the Sing-Akademie zu Berlin ===
Annual performances of Bach's oratorios on the traditional holidays (St. Matthew Passion, B Minor Mass, Christmas Oratorio), performances of well-known works of the great choral literature, among others by Johannes Brahms, Anton Bruckner, Georg Friedrich Händel, Joseph Haydn, Wolfgang Amadeus Mozart, Robert Schumann, Igor Stravinsky, as well as performances of almost forgotten works, for example Die Israeliten in der Wüste by Carl Philipp Emanuel Bach and sensational first performances by Joseph Haydn, Claudio Monteverdi, Otto Nicolai, Giovanni Battista Pergolesi, Giacomo Puccini, Alessandro Scarlatti and the world premiere of the Te Deum by the young Georges Bizet, which had been lost until then and was discovered by Lange in Paris, as well as performances of contemporary works such as Max Baumann's Deutsche Vesper, Hans Werner Henze's Musen Siziliens (commissioned composition) outline Lange's broad repertoire. The accompanying orchestras were alternately the Berliner Symphoniker orchestra and the Radio-Symphonie-Orchester Berlin. Concert tours have taken him to Germany and abroad, for example to Sweden, France and Poland.

Lange's cultural achievements over a quarter of a century were honoured by the award of the Music Prize of the German Critics (1952) and the Order of Merit of the Federal Republic of Germany (18 September 1967). A long and wide-ranging oeuvre is also evidenced by numerous recordings, in particular with the Norddeutscher Rundfunk (NDR).

== Recordings ==
- Wolfgang Amadeus Mozart: Ein musikalischer Spass., Le Chant du Monde LDX 8017 (mono)
- Carl Maria Von Weber: Der Freischütz (Opern-Querschnitt) RIAS-Kammerchor, Orchester der Deutsche Oper Berlin, Lieselotte Cloos (soprano), Sonja Schöner (soprano), Peter Roth-Ehrgang (bass), Horst Wilhelm (tenor), Mathieu Lange (conductor)
- Carl Maria von Weber: Der Freischütz (großer Querschnitt), 1964, BACCAROLA 77 869 ZR (stereo); Lieselotte Cloos (soprano), Sonja Schöner (soprano), Peter Roth-Ehrgang (bass), Horst Wilhelm (tenor), Günther Arndt-Chor und Orchester der Deutsche Oper Berlin, Leitung: Mathieu Lange
- Flötenkonzerte des Barock, 1976, Beteiligung mit dem Konzert für Flöte, Streicher und Continuo G-dur; B. Schaeffer (Flöte), Norddeutsches Kammerorchester, Mathieu Lange (conductor)
- Otto Nicolai, Te Deum, 1966, Sing-Akademie zu Berlin, Radio-Symphonie-Orchester Berlin, Mathieu Lange (conductor), Deutsche Grammophon, Nr. 104 479, vinyl, LP, Album (stereo)
- Giovanni Battista Pergolesi: Stabat Mater; Margot Guilleaume (soprano), Jeanne Deroubaix (contralto), Südwestdeutsches Kammerorchester, Carl Gorvin (Einstudierung), Mathieu Lange (conductor), Label: Archiv Produktion, 14 098 APM, Series: VIII. Forschungsbereich - Das Italienische Settecento – Series B: Der Neapolitanische Stilkreis, vinyl, LP (mono)
- Alessandro Scarlatti: Endimione E Cintia, Reri Grist (soprano), Tatiana Troyanos (soprano), Philharmonisches Staatsorchester Hamburg, Mathieu Lange (conductor), Label: Archiv Produktion – 2533 061, vinyl, LP
- Wolfgang Amadeus Mozart: Sinfonie D-dur KV 385 (Haffner-Symphony), Joseph Haydn: Symphony Nr. 83 G-moll (La Poule), Horst Richter (Textbearbeitung), the Kammerorchester Berlin, Mathieu Lange (conductor), Label: ETERNA, 720 042, vinyl, LP (mono), Deutsche Demokratische Republik
- Albert Lortzing: Zar und Zimmermann (Opern-Querschnitt), Paul Douliez (Textbearbeitung), Sonja Schöner (soprano), Helmut Krebs (tenor), Martin Vantin (tenor), Walter Hauck (baritone), Manfred Jungwirth (bass), Chor und Orchester der Städtischen Oper Berlin, Mathieu Lange (conductor), Label: Opera, 3111, vinyl (LP)
- Franz Konwitschny, Horst Stein, Meinhard von Zallinger and Mathieu Lange (conductors): Große Opern, Label: Falcon, L-ST 7069, vinyl, (LP); Beteiligung Langes: Carl Maria von Weber: Freischütz (Jägerchor), Rundfunk-Sinfonieorchester Berlin, Richard Wagner: Der fliegende Holländer (Steuermann, laß die Wacht), Chor der Komische Oper Berlin, Rundfunk-Symphonie-Orchester Berlin
