= Alexander Veprik =

Ukrainian-born Jewish Russian composer

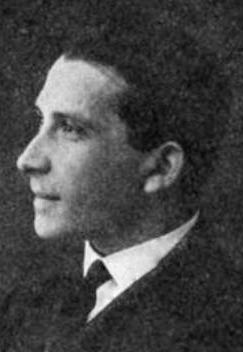
- Born: Alexander Moiseyevich Veprik; 23 June 1899; Balta, Podolia Governorate, Russian Empire
- Died: 13 October 1958 (aged 59); Moscow, Soviet Union
- Occupations: Composer, music educator

Alexander Moiseyevich Veprik, also Weprik, (Russian: Александр Моисеевич Веприк, Ukrainian: Олександр Мойсейович Веприк, Oleksandr Mojsejovyč Vepryk; 23 June 1899 – 13 October 1958) was a Russian-(Ukrainian) Soviet composer and music educator. Veprik is considered one of the greatest composers of the "Jewish school" in Soviet music.

== Life ==
Veprik was born in Balta, Podolia Governorate, Russian Empire (now Ukraine) on 23 June 1899. He grew up in Warsaw and studied piano with Karl Wendling at the Leipzig Conservatory. At the onset of World War I, the family returned to Russia. Veprik studied composition with Alexander Zhitomirsky (1881–1937) in the Saint Petersburg Conservatory (1918–1921) and Nikolai Myaskovsky at the Moscow Conservatory (1921–1923).

Veprik was active in the musical life of 1920–1930s. In 1923 he was active in the creation of the Society for Jewish Music, a focal point for Jewish composers in Moscow, and Jewish music flourished as a result of the activities of the Society. He taught at the Moscow Conservatory (1923–1941; professor from 1930; dean from 1938). In 1927 during a business trip in Austria, Germany and France, he met Arnold Schoenberg, Paul Hindemith, Maurice Ravel and Arthur Honegger. His music became well known in Europe and the United States during this time: nearly his entire oeuvre was performed by the Berlin Radio Symphony (1928–1929). In March 1933 Arturo Toscanini conducted Veprik's Dances and Songs of the Ghetto at Carnegie Hall in New York.

Veprik was arrested as a "Jewish nationalist" in 1950, maltreated in prison and then deported to the Gulag. He was released from hard labor and instead had to organize an amateur orchestra among the prisoners. In April 1954, Vepryk's case was reviewed and he was acquitted. In September 1954 he returned sick and weary to Moscow, to a world in which Jewish culture had no place. Veprik composed a few works and wrote Principles of J.S. Bach's Orchestration (Принципы оркестровки И.-С. Баха). He died on 13 October 1958 in Moscow.

== Selected works ==
=== Opera ===
- Toktogul (Токтогул), Opera (1940); libretto by Dzhoomart Bokombaev (1910–1944)
- Toktogul (Токтогул), Opera (1949); second opera with the same title composed jointly with Abdylas Maldybaev

=== Orchestral ===
- Dances and Songs of the Ghetto (Пляски и песни гетто; Tänze und Lieder des Ghetto), Op. 12 (1927)
- 5 Small Pieces (Пять маленьких пьес; Fünf kleine Orchesterstücke) for orchestra, Op. 17 (1930, revised 1957)
- Symphony No. 1 (1931)
- Funeral Song (Траурная песня; Trauergesang), Op. 20 No. 2 (1932, revised 1958)
- Song of Jubilation (Песня ликования; Chant de jubilation) (1935, revised 1958)
- Symphony No. 2 (1938)
- 3 Pieces on Kyrgyz Themes (Три пьесы на киргизские темы), Suite for orchestra (1941)
- Pastorale (Пастораль) (1946, revised 1958)
- Sinfonietta (Симфониетта) (1948)
- 2 Poems (Две поэмы) (1956, 1957)
- Improvisation (Импровизация) (1958)

=== Chamber music ===
- Songs of the Dead (Песни об умерших; Totenlieder) for viola and piano, Op. 4 (1923)
- Kaddish (Каддиш), Poem for violin, or viola, or flute, or oboe and piano, Op. 6 (1925); original for voice and piano
- Suite (Sonata) for violin and piano, Op. 7 (1925)

Comodito, abbandono
Barocco, al rigore di Tempo
Capriccioso, ma placido

- Chant rigoureux (Строгий напев) for clarinet and piano, Op. 9 (1926); transcription for viola and piano by Vadim Borisovsky
- Rhapsodie (Рапсодия) for viola and piano, Op. 11 (1926)
- 3 Folk Dances (Три народные пляски; Drei Volkstänze) for violin, cello and piano, Op. 13b (1928); original for piano
- 2 Pieces on Folk Themes (Две пьесы на народные темы) for cello and piano (1934)

=== Piano ===
- Piano Sonata No. 1, Op. 3 (1922)
- Piano Sonata No. 2, Op. 5 (1924)
- Dance (Пляска; Danse) (1927)
- 3 Folk Dances (Три народные пляски; Drei Volkstänze) for piano, Op. 13 (1928); also for piano trio, Op. 13b
- Piano Sonata No. 3 (1928)
- Album for Children (Детский альбом) (1930)
- 7 Pieces on Kyrgyz Themes (Семь пьес на киргизские темы) for piano 4-hands

=== Vocal ===
- Kaddish (Каддиш), Poem (Vocalise) for voice (without words) and piano, Op. 6 (1925); also for violin, or viola, or flute, or oboe and piano
- 2 Jewish Folk Songs (Две еврейские народные песни) for voice and piano, Op. 8 (1926)

1. Sait gesunterheit (О ты, прости, прощай)
2. Spaziren zainen mir gegangen (Однажды с милым вдвоём мы гуляли)

- 2 Jewish Songs (Две еврейские песни; Zwei hebräische Lieder) for voice and piano, Op. 10 (1926)

1. Hant zu hant (Держись ровнее)
2. Eins un zwei (Раз и два)

- Snowflakes (Снежинки); words by Demyan Bedny
- To the Barricades (На баррикадах) (1932); words from Revolutionary Songs of 1905
- Чангрийская песня (1937)
- 2 Ukrainian Songs (Две украинские песни) (1943)

=== Choral ===
- Stalinstan (Сталинстан) for chorus and piano (1934); words by Izi Kharik
- Suite from the Opera "Toktogul" (Сюита из оперы Токтогул) for soloists, chorus and orchestra (1942, revised 1958)
- The Curse of Fascism (Проклятие фашизму) for chorus and orchestra (1944)
- National Hero (Народ-герой), Cantata for chorus and orchestra (1955); words by Alexander Mashistov
- Song of Kotovsky (Песня о Котовском) for chorus a cappella (1935); words by Eduard Bagritsky
- Kyrgyz Song (Киргизская песня) for chorus a cappella (1950)

=== Film scores ===
- The Last Night (Последняя ночь) (1936); directed by Yuli Raizman

=== Literary ===
- О методах преподавания инструментовки на композиторском отделении (1929)
- Нужны ли переложения фортепианных произведений на оркестр (1930)
- Трактовка инструментов оркестра (1948, published 1961)
- Очерки по вопросам оркестровых стилей (published 1961)

== Discography ==
- Jewish Chamber Music – Tabea Zimmermann (viola); Jasha Nemtsov (piano); Hänssler Classic CD 93.008 (2000)

Rhapsodie, Op. 11
Songs of the Dead, Op. 4
Kaddish (Poem), Op. 6
Chant rigoureux, Op. 9

- Piano Trios: 3 Folk Dances, Op. 13b – Dmitry Sitkovetsky (violin); David Geringas (cello); Jascha Nemtsov (piano); Hänssler Classic CD 98.491 (2004)
- On Wings of Jewish Songs: Music from the New Jewish School – Helene Schneiderman (mezzo-soprano); Jascha Nemtsov (piano); Hänssler Classic CD 93.041 (2005)

Two Jewish Folk Songs for voice and piano, Op. 8 (1926)
Two Jewish Songs for voice and piano, Op. 10

- Turban & Nemtsov Play Hebrew Melodies: Suite No. 7 for violin and piano – Ingolf Turban (violin); Jascha Nemtsov (piano); Hänssler Classic CD 93.028 (2006)
- Alexander Veprik: Orchestral Works - Christoph-Mathias Mueller (conductor); BBC National Orchestra of Wales; MDG 901 2133-6 (SACD) 2019

Dances and Songs of the Ghetto, Op. 12
Two Symphonic Songs, Op. 20
Five Little Pieces for Orchestra, Op. 17
Pastorale
Two Poems

== Books ==
- Friedrich Geiger, ed.: Komponisten unter Stalin. Aleksandr Veprik und die "Neue jüdische Schule". Berichte und Studien, 25. Hannah Arendt Institute for the Research on Totalitarianism, Dresden ISBN 9783931648282 Online In German
