= James Avery (musician) =

American pianist and conductor

- Born: September 23, 1937; Hutchinson, Kansas
- Died: March 8, 2009 (aged 71); Freiburg im Breisgau, Germany
- Occupations: Conductor; Pianist

James Avery (September 23, 1937 – March 8, 2009) was an American classical pianist and conductor.

Avery was born in Hutchinson, Kansas and studied at the University of Kansas, and then at Indiana University (Bloomington) under Tibor Kozma. From 1967 to 1980 he taught at the University of Iowa in Iowa City, and from 1980 until 2002 at the Hochschule für Musik Freiburg in Germany. From 1992 he headed Ensemble SurPlus, playing mostly new music. Avery recorded works by Stefan Wolpe, Charles Wuorinen, Brian Ferneyhough, and Karlheinz Stockhausen. In the fall of 1978 he took a leave of absence from the University of Iowa in order to be a visiting artist at the American Academy in Rome (Trythall 2014, 84).

In 1992 he formed the contemporary music ensemble SurPlus, which he conducted and in which he performed on the piano. After its debut in Freiburg, Ensemble SurPlus performed at the Darmstädter Ferienkurse and at festivals throughout Europe (Ferneyhough, Schick, Veale, and Mahnkopf 2009, 2).

== Sources ==
- Ferneyhough, Brian, Steven Schick, Peter Veale, and Claus-Steffen Mahnkopf. 2009. "Tributes to James Avery" (archived on 28 July 2011 from http://www.searchnewmusic.org/avery_tributes.pdf accessed 30 March 2017).
- Trythall, Richard. 2014. "A History of the Rome Prize in Music Composition, 1947–2006". In Music and Musical Composition at the American Academy in Rome, edited by Martin Brody, 42–126. Eastman Studies in Music 121. Rochester: University of Rochester Press; Woodbridge: Boydell & Brewer Limited. ISBN 978-1-58046-245-7.
- The Andy Warhol Museum https://www.warhol.org/event/sound-series-ensemble-surplus/
