= William Workman (baritone) =

American baritone (1940–2019)

William Workman (February 4, 1940 – September 13, 2019) was an American baritone who had an active career in operas and concerts from the 1960s into the 2000s. Particularly active with the Hamburg State Opera (HSO) and Opera Frankfurt, he notably created the roles of Tony in the world premiere of Gian Carlo Menotti's Help, Help, the Globolinks! (1968) and Prince Henri of Condé in the world premiere of Krzysztof Penderecki's The Devils of Loudun (1969). His final appearance with the HSO was as Osmin in Mozart's Die Entführung aus dem Serail in 2004.

== Life and career ==
Born in Valdosta, Georgia, Workman studied voice at Davidson College with Donald Plott before pursuing studies in opera with Martial Singher at the Curtis Institute of Music in Philadelphia. He continued with further training with Singher at the Music Academy of the West in California. In 1965, he became a resident artist at the Hamburg State Opera (HSO), making his professional debut that year as the Second Prisoner in Ludwig van Beethoven's Fidelio. He remained committed to the HSO through 1972, during which he was a pupil of Hedwig Schilling. He created roles in two world premieres at the HSO, Tony in Gian Carlo Menotti's Help, Help, the Globolinks! (1968) and Prince Henri of Condé in Krzysztof Penderecki's The Devils of Loudun (1969). For the former opera, he reprised the role of Tony for the work's United States premiere at the Santa Fe Opera in 1969. He later returned to Santa Fe in 1987 to perform in Richard Strauss's Die schweigsame Frau. In 1971 he recorded the roles of Abramane and La Vengéance in Jean-Philippe Rameau's Zoroastre for Vox Records.

In 1972 Workman became a resident artist at Oper Frankfurt but returned frequently to the HSO as a guest artist. With the Frankfurt Opera he recorded the role of Papageno in Mozart's The Magic Flute for German television. With that opera house he also performed the role of Ratsuchende in the world premiere of Hans Zender's Stephen Climax in 1986. He made his debut at the Paris Opera in Rossini's La Cenerentola in 1977 and made his debut at the Royal Opera, London in 1984. In 1987 he performed the role of Ping in Giacomo Puccini's Turandot with the Pittsburgh Opera for the grand opening of the newly renovated Benedum Center. He has also appeared as a guest artist with the Dallas Opera, Metropolitan Opera, Opéra national du Rhin, Staatsoper Stuttgart, and Vienna State Opera.

Workman died in Horst, Steinburg, Germany.
