= Gerald Eckert =

German composer, cellist, and painter

Gerald Eckert (born 27 December 1960) is a German composer, cellist, and painter. He currently lives in Eckernförde.

== Biography ==
Eckert, born in Nuremberg, studied mathematics at the University of Erlangen, violoncello and conducting at the conservatory of Nürnberg. Then he studied of composition with Nicolaus A. Huber and Walter Zimmermann and electroacoustic composition at the Folkwang-Hochschule Essen. Composition courses with James Dillon, Brian Ferneyhough and Jonathan Harvey. 1995 he received a scholarship of the Fondation Royaumont/France. 1996/97 work as visiting scholar at the CCRMA of the Stanford University/US. 1998 he was guest professor at Darmstadt and at Akiyoshidai/Japan. 1999 he received a scholarship of the Heinrich-Strobel-Fondation, 2000/02 he was lecturer at the TU Darmstadt. 2000 he realized a dance project with Dyane Neiman. 2006 he was composer in residence at the festival for contemporary music at Zurich/Switzerland. 2008 he realized together with the academy of the arts Berlin a project for choir, dancers, ensemble, video and electronics.

He received various prizes and awards: Gulbenkian Prize '93, NDR-Prize '94, Kranichsteiner Musikpreis '96, nomination for the ICMC '96 Hong-Kong and '03 Singapore, composition award of the "Biennale Hannover" '97, "S. Martirano Competition" USA 2003, 1st prize of Bourges 2003, nomination for the world-music-days '95 and '04, 1st prize of Stuttgart 2005, a scholarship for Venice 2006 and for Los Angeles 2010.

As cello player various recordings on different broadcasting stations of works by John Cage, Morton Feldman, Hans Zender, a.o.

Since 1989 work on paintings. Exhibitions and installations.
