= Olaf Tzschoppe =

German percussionist and chamber musician

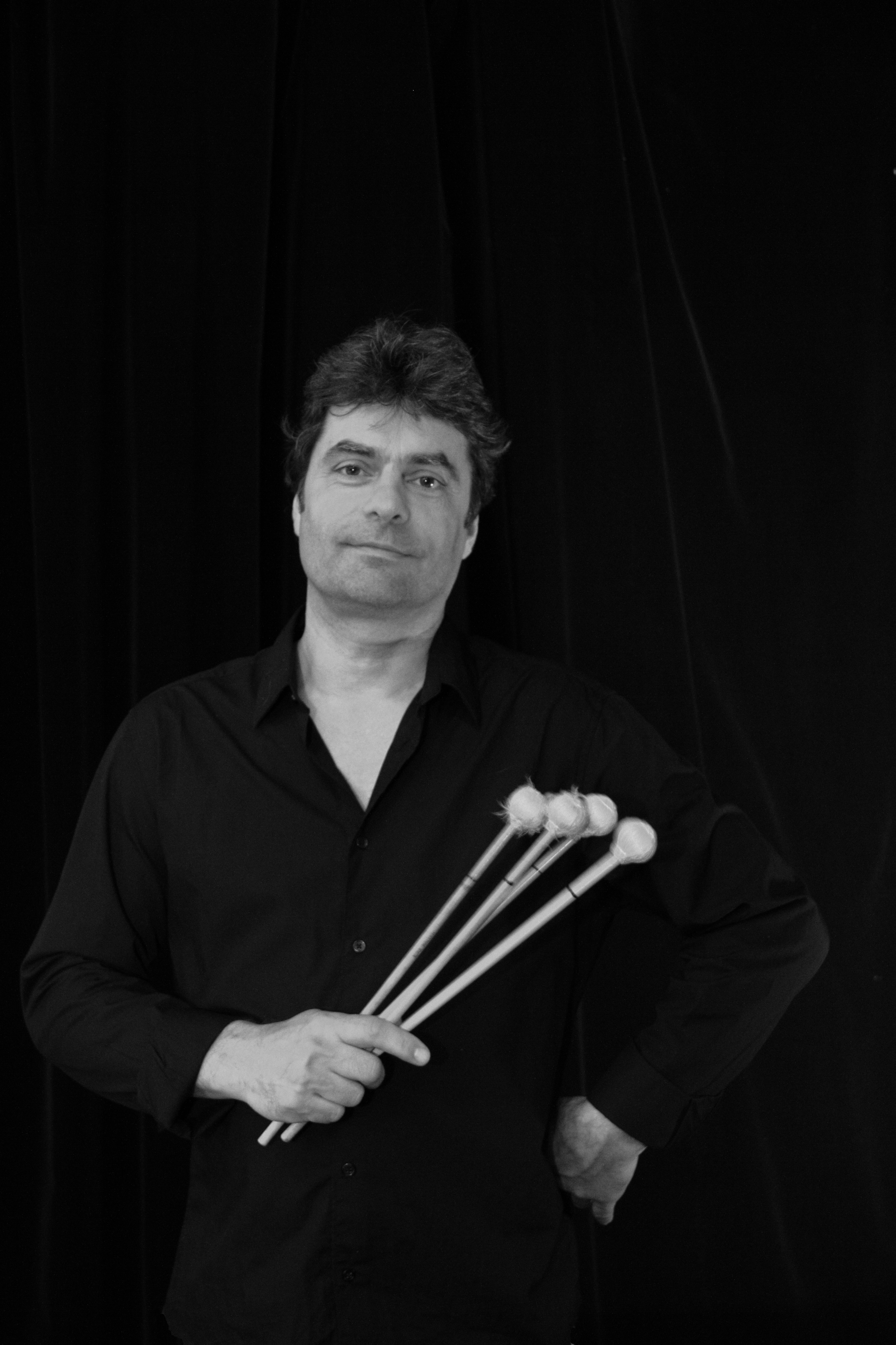
Olaf Tzschoppe (2013)

Olaf Tzschoppe (born 1962 in Kiel) is a German percussionist and chamber musician.

== Early life and education ==
Tzschoppe was born in 1962 in Kiel. He studied percussion at the Hochschule für Musik Freiburg (Germany), with Bernhard Wulff and at the University of Michigan in Ann Arbor (USA) with Michael Udow and was a scholarship holder of the German Academic Exchange Service (DAAD)

== Career ==
Since 1992, Tzschoppe has been a member of the Soloist-Ensemble Percussions of Strasbourg with which he has won numerous prizes and awards, and a founding member of Ensemble SurPlus and Trio SurPlus, Freiburg. He is also a member of the Ensemble Experimental of Südwestrundfunk. and has performed with ensembles including Klangforum Wien, Ensemble Modern and Ensemble Musikfabrik.

Tzschoppe specializes in repertoires for organ and percussion. There are a lot of works that have been written especially for him and Zsigmond Szathmáry. Some of those pieces have been released on "entgrenzt/unbounded".

In addition to solo concerts, Tzschoppe also plays improvised music. He has cooperated with Turkish drummer Murat Coşkun for a long time as well.

In 2004, Tzschoppe was appointed Professor for percussion and chamber music at the University of the Arts Bremen.

== Compositions ==
- Pictures of an Exhibition Arr. for Organ and Percussion (2002)
- Guro for Viola and Percussion (2006–07)
- Kolongala for Solo percussion (2008)
- Kolongala Kupanuliwa for spatialized percussion Quartett (2014)
- A Night on bald mountain Arr. for Organ and Percussion (2019)
