= Michael Custodis =

German musicologist and university teacher (b. 1973)

Michael Custodis (born 1973) is a German musicologist, sociologist and university lecturer at the Westfälische Wilhelms-Universität in Münster.

== Career ==
Born in Cologne, Custodis studied musicology, sociology, comparative politics, educational science and film studies at the Universität Mainz. He then moved to the University of Bergen (Norway) and finally to Albrecht Riethmüller at Freie Universität Berlin. He received his diploma in sociology, his doctorate in musicology and his habilitation at the FU Berlin.

His work focuses on music sociology and music aesthetics; music and politics as well as the interactions between "popular" and "classical" music and finally music in literature.

== Publications ==
=== Author ===
- Die soziale Isolation der neuen Musik. Zum Kölner Musikleben nach 1945 (Archiv für Musikwissenschaft) Beiheft 54), Stuttgart 2004.
- Musik im Prisma der Gesellschaft. Wertungen in literarischen und ästhetischen Texten. Münster 2009.
- Klassische Musik heute. Eine Spurensuche in der Rockmusik. Bielefeld 2009.
- with Friedrich Geiger: Netzwerke der Entnazifizierung. Kontinuitäten im deutschen Musikleben am Beispiel von Werner Egk, Hilde und Heinrich Strobel (Münsteraner Schriften zur zeitgenössischen Musik. 1). Münster among others 2013.

=== Editor ===
- With Friedrich Geiger, Michael Lüthy, Sabine Slanina: KünstlerKritiker. Zum Verhältnis von Produktion und Kritik in bildender Kunst und Musik. Saarbrücken 2007.
- with Insa Bernds, Frank Hentschel: Albrecht Riethmüller, Annäherung an Musik – Studien und Essays. Stuttgart 2007.
- with Albrecht Riethmüller: Georg Kreisler − Grenzgänger. Sieben Beiträge mit einem Nachwort von Georg Kreisler. Freiburg i.Br. 2009.
- Erfolg − Entgrenzung − Erfahrung. Soziologische Perspektiven auf die Künste der Gegenwart. Berlin 2010.
- Traditionen, Koalitionen, Visionen. Wolfgang Steinecke und die Internationalen Ferienkurse in Darmstadt. Internationales Musikinstitut Darmstadt, Saarbrücken 2010.
- Herman-Walther Frey: Ministerialrat, Wissenschaftler, Netzwerker. NS-Hochschulpolitik und die Folgen (Münsteraner Schriften zur zeitgenössischen Musik. 2). Münster among others. 2014.
