= Help, Help, the Globolinks! =

Opera by Gian Carlo Menotti

Hilfe, Hilfe, die Globolinks! Help, Help, the Globolinks!
- Opera by Gian Carlo Menotti
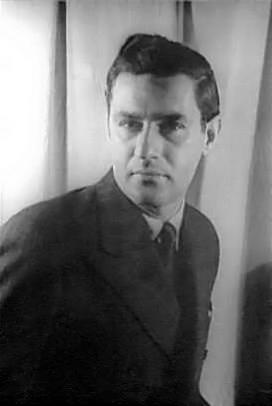
- The composer in 1944
- Librettist: Menotti
- Language: English
- Premiere: 21 December 1968 (in German); Hamburg State Opera

Help, Help, the Globolinks! is an opera in four scenes by Gian Carlo Menotti with an original English libretto by the composer. It was commissioned by the Hamburg State Opera and first performed as Hilfe, Hilfe, die Globolinks! in a German translation by Kurt Honolka on December 21, 1968, in a double bill with Menotti's Amahl and the Night Visitors. The opera had its English language premiere on August 1, 1969, in the United States at the Santa Fe Opera in a double bill with Igor Stravinsky's The Nightingale. Both premiere productions were directed by the composer. Many of the cast members from the Santa Fe production reprised their roles for the work's New York debut at the New York City Opera in December 1969.

== Roles ==
Roles, voice types, premiere casts
Role	Voice type	German-language premiere cast Hamburg, 21 December 1968 Conductor: Matthias Kuntzsch	English-language premiere cast Santa Fe, 1 August 1969 Conductor: Gustav Meier
Emily, 14 years old	soprano	Edith Mathis	Judith Blegen
Madame Euterpova, the music teacher	soprano	Arlene Saunders	Marguerite Willauer
Dr. Stone, dean of St. Paul's School	high baritone	Raymond Wolansky	John Reardon
Tony, the bus driver	baritone	William Workman	William Workman
Timothy, caretaker of the school	tenor	Kurt Marschner	Douglas Perry
Miss Penelope Newkirk, the mathematics teacher	mezzo-soprano	Ursula Boese	Jean Kraft
Mr. Lavander-Gas, the literature professor	baritone	Franz Grundheber	Clyde Phillip Walker
Dr. Turtlespit, the science professor	bass	Noël Mangin	Richard Best
12 children (some of whom are required to sing small solo parts): children's chorus
Globolinks: members of the Corps de ballet

== Synopsis ==
=== Prologue ===
The opening fugue is interrupted by a police bulletin telling us that dangerous creatures known only as Globolinks have landed on earth. A ballet follows accompanied by recorded electronic music, during which the Globolinks are shown invading our planet.

=== Scene 1 ===
The Beleaguered Children

The Globolinks disable a school bus on a country road as it returns from spring vacation with a load of students. Another radio bulletin informs Tony, the bus driver, and the children that the creatures seem to be allergic to the sound of music. When the Globolinks threaten the bus, Tony first tries to keep them in check with the sound of the bus horn, which scares them temporarily. The students decide to try to reach the school to call for help, but most have forgotten their musical instruments, which could protect them along the way. Only Emily has remembered her violin. She is hesitant to venture out on her own, but after Tony and the other children reassure her, she bravely leaves the bus behind, playing her violin all the way.

=== Scene 2 ===
The Teachers

In the Dean's office of St. Paul school, Dr. Stone and Timothy are worried about where the children could be. Madame Euterpova interrupts, complaining that the students have left their instruments behind during their spring vacation, even though they had promised to take them home to practice. Because of Dr. Stone's disregard for her music lessons, she threatens to resign. He sees teaching music as insignificant and admits that he cannot even sing himself. He dismisses her and lies down to relieve his "splitting headache", only to hear another radio bulletin warning that "once you are touched by a Globolink, you lose all power of speech" and are turned into one yourself within 24 hours. While he is asleep, the Globolinks come into the office and touch Dr. Stone. He rings the school bell to drive them away. The teachers rush in, only to find that Dr. Stone can speak only in weird, electronic sounds. As they debate what to do, Madame Euterpova appears as a savior in their time of need, and gathers the teachers along with their own musical instruments, including a drum and a tuba. They all march out of the school to locate and save the missing children.

=== Scene 3 ===
The Rescue

Tony and the students are still waiting in the broken-down bus for Emily to return. The Globolinks no longer fear the sound of the horn and attack again. Just in time, the teachers arrive with their motley band of instruments, and the Globolinks disappear. Emily, who has made her way into the forest, is still missing. Dr. Stone, although almost a Globolink himself, has been taught by Madame Euterpova to sing just one note to keep them at bay. He believes he can help find Emily. They all march off following Dr. Stone as fast as they can.

=== Scene 4 ===
The Forest of Steel

Emily has lost her way in the forest. Although still playing her violin, she soon falls down in exhaustion. The Globolinks approach her while she is sleeping and break her violin. Emily screams and runs for help, only to find Dr. Stone still singing his one note. She does not understand why he looks and sounds so strange. He has lost his voice and can only stammer "La, la". He finally completes his transformation into a Globolink and flies away. At this moment, the teachers and students arrive and Emily is finally safe. Madame Euterpova implores everyone to always make music with their hands and breath, as "she leads the little army away, all happily playing their instruments".

== Critical reactions ==
Life published a review of the 1969 New York City Center production titled "Bleeps in the Night". The article explores some of the themes employed in the opera and the differences between Globolinks and Menotti's 1951 opera for children, Amahl and the Night Visitors.

Menotti described the Globolinks as "sinister, but with a touch of humor". The electronic sound effects that are heard when the Globolinks appear sound like they are from a bad science fiction film. The creatures themselves are played for camp, not terror. The dialogue between the music teacher and the dean is played as broad farce both dramatically and vocally. Madame Euterpova often serves as Menotti's own conscience, declaring that the world has "forgotten how to sing". But, he also makes her somewhat ridiculous and egotistical so that she does not become too preachy. Menotti was fearful of the new wave of electronics and experimentation in music of the time, wondering whether these styles might eventually replace the drama and melody of traditional opera. To this end, the Globolinks are accompanied by bizarre electronic noises and can only be stopped by real, live music, such as Emily's violin.

== Recording ==
The first studio recording, conducted by John DeMain, was published by Newport Classic in 1998.

The original Hamburg production was filmed by German television in 1969, and was released on DVD on February 27, 2007.
