= Darmstädter Ferienkurse =

Festival of contemporary music

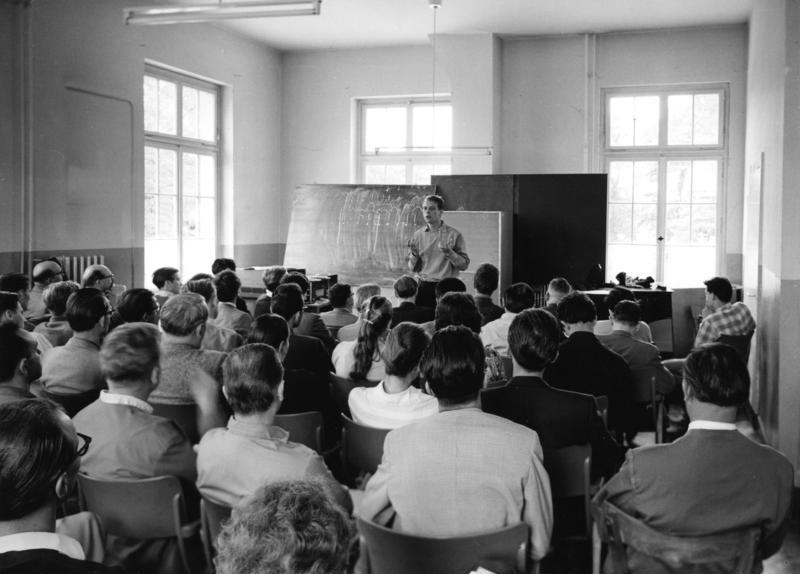
- Course with Karlheinz Stockhausen in 1957
- Genre: Contemporary classical music in courses and concerts
- Frequency: annually 1946 to 1970; bi-annually from 1972
- Locations: Darmstadt, many locations
- Inaugurated: 1946; 80 years ago
- Founder: Wolfgang Steinecke
- Participants: Composers; Performers; Music theorists; Philosophers
- Patrons: City of Darmstadt, Staatstheater, broadcasters
- Website: www.internationales-musikinstitut.de/ferienkurse

Darmstädter Ferienkurse (Darmstadt Summer Course) (Note: lit. Darmstadt Vacation Courses) is a regular summer event of contemporary classical music in Darmstadt, Hesse, Germany. It was founded in 1946, under the name "Ferienkurse für Internationale Neue Musik Darmstadt" (Vacation Courses of International New Music in Darmstadt), as a gathering with lectures and concerts over several summer weeks. Composers, performers, theorists and philosophers of contemporary music met first annually until 1970, and then biennially. The event was organised by the Kranichsteiner Musikinstitut, which was renamed Internationales Musikinstitut Darmstadt (IMD). It is regarded as a leading international forum of contemporary and experimental music with a focus on composition. The festival awards the Kranichsteiner Musikpreis for performers and young composers.

== History ==
=== Overview ===
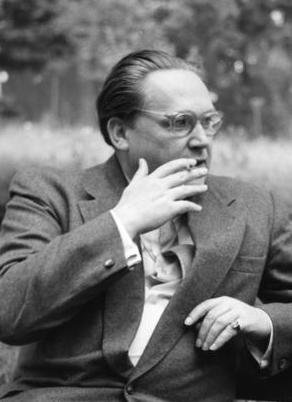
Wolfgang Steinecke in 1957

The Ferienkurse were initiated in 1946 by Wolfgang Steinecke, then responsible for culture in the municipal government of Darmstadt. He directed them until his death in 1961, succeeded by Ernst Thomas (1962–81), Friedrich Ferdinand Hommel (1981–94), Solf Schaefer (1995–2009), and Thomas Schäfer, who has been artistic director and president of the IMD from 2009.

The courses were first held annually, lasting for about twelve days. From 1970, they have been held biennially for two to three weeks. The first venue was Jagdschloss Kranichstein, a rural hunting lodge in Darmstadt. Beginning in 1949, public buildings in Darmstadt have been used not only for some concerts as in the beginning, but also for courses.

=== Background ===
The Ferienkurse were founded to reconnect Germany to the international scene in classical music, as modernist forms of classical music (such as expressionist music, the Second Viennese School and serialism) had been systematically suppressed by the Nazis from 1933 as "degenerate music". During that time, representatives of the modernist movement had been expelled, silenced, or murdered.

=== Beginning ===
The first event in 1946 offered courses in conducting by Carl Mathieu Lange, musical composition by Wolfgang Fortner, piano by Georg Kuhlmann, voice by Elisabeth Delseit, violin by Günter Kehr, opera direction by Bruno Hey and Walter Jockisch, and music criticism by Fred Hamel.

A first series were courses, lectures and concerts from 25 August to 21 September. They were followed by public concerts and lectures, titled "Internationale zeitgenössische Musiktage" (International contemporary music days) from 22 to 29 September, held in collaboration with the city of Darmstadt, its Landestheater, and the broadcasters Süddeutscher Rundfunk and Radio Frankfurt. Events included an exhibition of the Neue Darmstädter Sezession, "Zeitgenössische deutsche Kunst", and also Carl Orff's opera Die Kluge, and the award ceremony of the Georg Büchner Prize to Fritz Usinger. Concerts presented several world premieres, such as Erich Sehlbach's string sextet, Fortner's für Klavier, Günter Raphael's sonata for solo flute, a trio for flute, viola and cello by Günter Bialas (1923), Henze's Kranichsteiner Kammerkonzert for flute, piano and strings, and Hölderlin-Lieder by Hermann Reutter. Willy Burkhard's Symphonie in einem Satz (1944) and Hindemith's String Quartet No. 6 (1943) received their first performance in Germany.

During the first years of the event, a focus was on German premieres of works, sometimes decades after their composition, by composers such as Arnold Schönberg, Anton Webern, Igor Stravinsky and Béla Bartók. Schoenberg's Piano Concerto was played in 1948, and his String Quartet No. 4 in 1949. That year, a symphony concert was dedicated exclusively to Schoenberg's works, including the German premiere of his Violin Concerto, honouring his 75th birthday. The 70th birthday of Webern was honoured with a concert of his chamber music in 1953.

It was the first forum of contemporary music in Germany after World War II, including music theory and philosophy. Lectures were held by instructors such as Theodor W. Adorno, René Leibowitz, Heinz-Klaus Metzger, and later Carl Dahlhaus and Rudolf Stephan, offering critical reflection of advanced composition. Composers such as Edgard Varèse, Olivier Messiaen, (Note: However, although Messiaen paid "a brief visit" to the courses in 1949, "he neither taught students nor lectured" there.) Ernst Krenek, Earle Brown and John Cage visited, presenting their work and aesthetic in composition classes, and contributing to worldwide recognition of the institution.

=== Darmstadt School ===
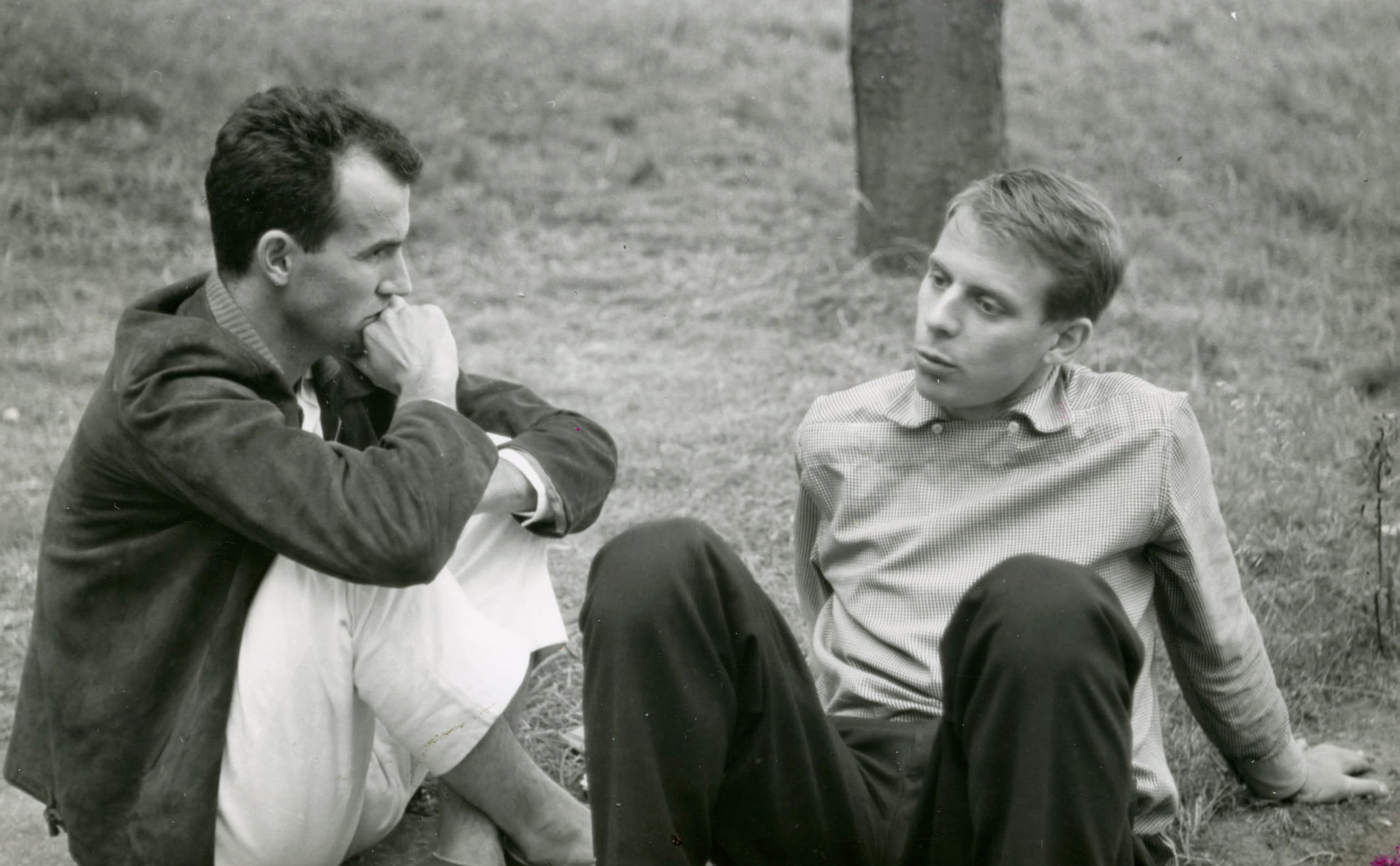
Luigi Nono and Karlheinz Stockhausen in 1957

Composers such as, initially, Karlheinz Stockhausen, Pierre Boulez, Luigi Nono, Bruno Maderna, and later Luciano Berio, Aldo Clementi, Franco Donatoni, Niccolò Castiglioni, Franco Evangelisti, Karel Goeyvaerts, Mauricio Kagel, Gottfried Michael Koenig, Giacomo Manzoni, Henri Pousseur, Helmut Lachenmann, and Brian Ferneyhough presented their radical approach and theories. They are sometimes referred to as the "Darmstädter Schule" (Darmstadt School).

Notable performers instructed in new playing techniques, and works by young composers (Nachwuchskomponisten) were offered in so-called Atelierkonzerte (atelier concerts).

=== Internationales Musikinstitut Darmstadt ===
For the organisation of the event, the Internationales Musikinstitut Darmstadt was founded in 1948. It also keeps an archive of past events and compositions. It holds around 20,000 photographs, 10,000 letters, sound files and other documents, available online since 2016. The event is sponsored by several organisations, especially public broadcasters.

=== Kranichsteiner Musikpreis ===
A prize, the Kranichsteiner Musikpreis was installed in 1952, first for performers, then also for composers.

Recipients include performers (with their instrument listed) and composers:

- 1952 Karlheinz Zöller (flute)
- 1955 Marion Zarzeczna (piano)
- 1957 Jerome Lowenthal (piano)
- 1958 Otto Zykan (piano), Gábor Gabos (piano), Wolfgang Gayler (piano)
- 1959 Erika Haase (piano)
- 1960 Bruno Canino (piano)
- 1972 Gillian Bibby, Suzanne Stephens (clarinet)
- 1974 Detlev Müller-Siemens, Moya Henderson, Wolfgang Meyer (clarinet)
- 1976 Ulrich Stranz
- 1978 Wolfgang Rihm
- 1980 Clarence Barlow
- 1982 James Dillon, Steven Schick (percussion), Michael Bach (cello), Robert H.P. Platz
- 1984 Bernardo Kuczer
- 1986 Richard Barrett, Kaija Saariaho, Bunita Marcus, Steffen Schleiermacher (piano)
- 1990 Luca Francesconi, Roger Redgate, Rodney Sharman, Joël-François Durand
- 1992 James Clarke, Chaya Czernowin
- 1996 Mark Andre, Gerald Eckert, Isabel Mundry
- 2000 Jennifer Walshe
- 2002 Martin Schüttler
- 2004 Hans Thomalla
- 2006 Tatjana Kozlova
- 2008 Simon Steen-Andersen
- 2010 Stefan Prins
- 2012 Johannes Kreidler
- 2014 Ashley Fure
- 2016 Celeste Oram
- 2018 Sara Glojnarić
- 2023 Kari Watson
- 2025 Kalun Leung and Pietro Elia Barcellona

=== Criticism ===
During the late 1950s and early 1960s the courses were charged with a perceived lack of interest on the part of some of its zealot followers in any music not matching the uncompromisingly modern views of Pierre Boulez – the "party subservience" of the "clique orthodoxy" of a "sect", in the words of Kurt Honolka, written in 1962 in an effort to "make the public believe that the most advanced music of the day was no more than a fancy cooked up by a bunch of aberrant conspirators conniving at war against music proper." This led to the use of the phrase "Darmstadt School" (coined originally in 1957 by Luigi Nono to describe the serial music being written at that time by himself and composers such as Boulez, Maderna, Stockhausen, Berio, and Pousseur) as a pejorative term, implying a "mathematical", rule-based music.

=== Recordings ===
The courses presented in 70 years around 5,000 world premieres. The record label col legno has published recordings, often documenting world premieres and first performances in Germany.
