= Stephen Climax =

1986 German opera by Hans Zender

- Opera by Hans Zender
- Librettist: Zender
- Language: German
- Based on: Acta Sanctorum; Ulysses by James Joyce
- Premiere: 15 June 1986; Oper Frankfurt

Stephen Climax is an opera in three acts by Hans Zender, who wrote his own libretto based on James Joyce and Hugo Ball. It was premiered on 15 June 1986 at the Oper Frankfurt, staged by Alfred Kirchner and conducted by Peter Hirsch. The opera was published by Breitkopf & Härtel. A 1990 production at La Monnaie in Brussels was recorded.

== History ==
Zender wrote his own libretto, based on two literary sources, Hugo Ball's Symeon, der Stylit (Simeon Stylites) from his legends of saints, and the Stephen Dedalus episodes from Ulysses by James Joyce. Zender worked on the opera from 1976 and again from 1984.

Stephen Climax was premiered on 15 June 1986 at the Oper Frankfurt, staged by Alfred Kirchner and conducted by Peter Hirsch. It was the only world premiere at the Oper Frankfurt during the Gielen era. It was also performed at La Monnaie in Brussels in 1990 and the Staatstheater Nürnberg in 1991. The opera was published by Breitkopf & Härtel.

== Theme ==
A main character of the opera is St Simeon Stylites, as described in the Acta Sanctorum. Joyce used motifs in his Ulysses which Zender read in the German translation by Hans Wollschläger. His story, as a hermit who lives on a column for decades and is venerated as a saint, is juxtaposed with scenes from the novel by Joyce.

== Roles ==
Roles, voice types, premiere cast
Role	Voice type	Premiere cast, 15 June 1986 Conductor: Peter Hirsch
Simeon, Säulensteher	tenor	Ian Caley
Antonios	bass-baritone	Franz Mayer
3 Ratsuchende	baritone, bass, youthful baritone	William Workman
Simeon's mother	soprano	June Card
Vorsänger	tenor	
Tanzlehrer Professor Maginni	tenor	Alfred Vökt
Stephen	youthful baritone	Lyndon Terracini
Leopold Bloom	bass	Joshua Hecht
Lynch	bass	Barry Mora
Bella Cohen	mezzo-soprano	Sandra Walker
Zoe	soprano	Nancy Shade
Kitty	mezzo-soprano	Ilse Gramatzki
Florry	contralto	Karen Rambo
Carr	tenor	William Pell
Compton	tenor	Bodo Schwanbeck

The action takes place in the Syrian Desert and in Dublin at night.

== Music ==
Stephen Climax is scored for soloists, choir, two orchestral groups, stage music and tape playback. The duration is given as 135 minutes, also as 150 minutes.

== Recording ==
In 1992, academy released a CD set with a live performance of the 1990 Brussels production, with Dale Duesing as Stephen, Ronald Hamilton as Simeon, Isoldé Elchlepp as Bella, and Ellen Shade as Simeon's mother, and conducted by Sylvain Cambreling.
