= June Card =

American soprano and stage director

- Born: April 10, 1937 (age 89); Dunkirk, New York
- Education: Mannes College The New School for Music
- Occupations: Classical soprano; Stage director
- Organization: Oper Frankfurt
- Awards: Kammersängerin

June Card (born April 10, 1937) is an American soprano and stage director who had an active career in operas and concerts from 1959 through today. She began her career as a chorus girl on Broadway before moving into opera.

She established herself as an operatic soprano in Germany during the mid to late 1960s, ultimately forging a more-than-30-year-long partnership with the Oper Frankfurt. She also appeared as a guest artist with major opera houses internationally and worked as a soloist in the oratorio repertoire. In recent years she has been active as a stage director for opera productions in Germany, France and America, and worked as a voice teacher and master class instructor.

== Career ==
The daughter of Clifford C. and Elsie Card, Elsie June Card was born on April 10, 1937 in Dunkirk, New York. She studied singing with May Browner at the Mannes College The New School for Music. While a student she began her career performing as an ensemble member in the original Broadway production of Rodgers and Hammerstein's The Sound of Music in 1959-1960, including the opening night. She left that production to appear in the ensemble of the original cast of Meredith Willson's The Unsinkable Molly Brown in 1960-1961. She then appeared in the ensemble of the original 1962 production of The Gay Life and was also the understudy for Barbara Cook in the role of Liesl.

=== Opera ===
Card made her professional opera debut in 1963 as the Southern Girl in the world premiere of Jerome Moross' Gentlemen, Be Seated! at the New York City Opera, then sang Valencienne in Die lustige Witwe (opposite Beverly Sills) with the company. She then moved to Germany where she was committed to Theater Regensburg from 1965–1967, the Staatstheater am Gärtnerplatz from 1967–1980, and from 1969 up into the 2000s at the Oper Frankfurt. She also appeared as a guest artist at the Bavarian State Opera, the Berlin State Opera, the Cologne Opera, the Edinburgh Festival, the Hamburg State Opera, the Holland Festival, La Fenice, La Monnaie, the Liceu, the Palais Garnier, the Royal Opera, London, the Salzburg Festival, the Staatsoper Stuttgart, the Teatro dell'Opera di Roma, the Teatro di San Carlo, the Vienna State Opera, and the Zurich Opera. In 1985 she made her debut at the Metropolitan Opera as Marie in Berg's Wozzeck.

During her career, Card appeared in several premieres, including Mark Lothar's Der widerspenstige Heilige (1968), Hans Zender's Stephen Climax (1986), John Cage's Europera I and Europera II (1987), and Volker David Kirchner's Erinys (1990). In 1988 she sang in the United States premiere of Europera I and Europera II at the Pepsico Summerfare. Some of the more than 120 leading roles she has performed on stage include: Brünnhilde in Wagner's Götterdämmerung, Carlotta in Schreker's Die Gezeichneten, Chrysothemis in Richard Strauss's Elektra, the Countess in Tchaikovsky's The Queen of Spades, Donna Elvira in Mozart's Don Giovanni, Elvira in Rossini's L'italiana in Algeri, Giorgetta in Puccini's Il tabarro, Lady Macbeth in Verdi's Macbeth, Leonore in Beethoven's Fidelio, Madeleine in Adam's Le postillon de Lonjumeau, Marguerite in Gounod's Faust, Marie in Zimmermann's Die Soldaten, Marie in Donizetti's La fille du régiment, the Marschallin in Strauss's Der Rosenkavalier, Micaela in Bizet's Carmen, Melisande in Debussy's Pelléas et Mélisande, Minnie in Puccini's La fanciulla del West, both Mimì and Musetta in Puccini's La bohème, Nedda in Leoncavallo's Pagliacci, Norina in Donizetti's Don Pasquale, Giulietta in Offenbach's The Tales of Hoffmann, Rosina in Rossini's The Barber of Seville, Sieglinde in Die Walküre, Violetta in Verdi's La traviata, the Woman in Poulenc's La voix humaine, Zdenka in Strauss's Arabella, and the title roles in Aida, L'incoronazione di Poppea, The Cunning Little Vixen, Jenůfa, Lulu, Káťa Kabanová, Madama Butterfly, Salome, and Tosca. In the production of Wagner's Der Ring des Nibelungen in Frankfurt, staged by Ruth Berghaus and conducted by Michael Gielen, she appeared as Freia and Gutrune.

She performed the part of the Duchess of Parma in Ferruccio Busoni's Doktor Faust at the Oper Frankfurt in 1980, staged by Hans Neuenfels, with Günther Reich in the title role and William Cochran as Mephistopheles. In 1999 she sang there the Witch in Engelbert Humperdinck's Hänsel und Gretel, Herodias in Salome, and the Mother in Adriana Hölszky's Die Wände. In 2000 she took the part of the Leitmetzerin in Der Rosenkavalier. In 2001 she appeared as The Old Burya in Jenůfa at the Salzburg Festival, conducted by John Eliot Gardiner. In 2005 she sang the role also in Frankfurt.

In 2022, Opera Depot published a "live" performance from Frankfurt on Compact Discs of Card as Chrysothemis in Elektra, conducted by Klauspeter Seibel.

=== Concert ===
In 1980 Card premiered Wilhelm Killmayer's Französisches Liederbuch at the Schwetzingen Festival with baritone Philippe Huttenlocher and the Südwestdeutsches Kammerorchester, conducted by Paul Angerer.

== Awards ==
She was awarded the title Kammersängerin ("Chamber singer") by both Frankfurt and Munich.

== Sources ==
- Chronology of Western Classical Music: 1751-1900 By Charles J. Hall
