= Dale Duesing =

American baritone

Dale Duesing (born September 26, 1945) is an American baritone. As an opera singer, he has had an international career spanning five decades.

Duesing grew up in Milwaukee, Wisconsin. He studied piano throughout childhood, and enrolled at Lawrence University, majoring in piano performance. He switched to vocal performance while in college, and won the Metropolitan Opera Competition in his final year of study. After traveling to Europe with a Fulbright Scholarship, Duesing made a name for himself there.

Duesing has performed at the Metropolitan Opera, San Francisco Opera, Lyric Opera of Chicago, La Scala (as Arlecchino in Ariadne auf Naxos, 1984), Vienna State Opera, Paris Opéra, and Covent Garden, among others.

He appeared at the Metropolitan from 1979 to 1989 in Ariadne auf Naxos (with Johanna Meier and René Kollo), Die Zauberflöte (opposite Rita Shane, then Zdzisława Donat, as the Queen of Night), Pagliacci (as Silvio, with Carlo Bergonzi and Cornell MacNeil), Don Pasquale (directed by John Dexter), Il barbiere di Siviglia, Pelléas et Mélisande (a performance later released on Compact Discs), Peter Grimes (as Ned Keene, opposite Jon Vickers), Billy Budd (with Richard Cassilly, in Dexter's production), and Die Fledermaus (as Dr Falke).

In 2006 and 2011 Mr. Duesing was seen as the Forester in The Cunning Little Vixen in The Netherlands.

The baritone has also sung under the direction of Karl Böhm, Leonard Bernstein, James Levine, Carlo Maria Giulini, Edo de Waart, Herbert von Karajan, and Seiji Ozawa.

In 1993, Duesing received a Grammy Award for his 1991 recording of Samuel Barber's The Lovers with the Chicago Symphony Orchestra and was named the Singer of the Year by Opernwelt magazine in 1994. Duesing made his debut as director at Frankfurt Opera with Il viaggio a Reims.

Other of his recordings include Così fan tutte (conducted by Bernard Haitink, 1986), Hans Zender's Stephen Climax (with Ronald Hamilton as St Simeon Stylites, 1990), and La vie avec un idiot (conducted by Mstislav Rostropovich, 1992). On DVD are Wozzeck (1996) and Moses und Aron (2009).
