= Peter Hirsch (conductor) =

German conductor, especially of opera (born 1956)

- Born: 1956 (age 69–70); Cologne, Germany
- Education: Hochschule für Musik und Tanz Köln
- Occupation: Conductor
- Website: peterhirsch.de

Peter Hirsch (born 1956) is a German conductor, especially of opera. He has conducted several premieres, including Hans Zender's Stephen Climax at the Oper Frankfurt, and is focused on the work by Bernd Alois Zimmermann. Hirsch has appeared at international opera houses and festivals.

== Life and career ==
Born in Cologne, Hirsch studied at the Hochschule für Musik und Tanz Köln. Subsequently he was assistant to Michael Gielen at the Oper Frankfurt, where he was first Kapellmeister from 1984 to 1987.

Hirsch conducted the premiere of the revised and complete version of Luigi Nono's Prometeo at La Scala in Milan in 1985. A year later, he conducted the world premiere of Hans Zender's opera Stephen Climax in Frankfurt, and of Nono's Risonanze erranti.

He has conducted opera in Europe (at the Welsh National Opera, the English National Opera, the Nederlandse Opera and the Staatsoper Unter den Linden among others). In addition, Hirsch has worked regularly with the Deutsches Symphonie-Orchester Berlin and the Rundfunk-Sinfonieorchester Berlin. He has worked with the hr-Sinfonieorchester, the MDR Sinfonieorchester, the National Orchestra of Belgium and the Bournemouth Symphony Orchestra. He appeared at international festivals such as the Salzburg Festival, the Bologna Festival, Steirischer Herbst, the Ars Musica in Brussels, the Berliner Festwochen the Munich Biennale and the Festival d'automne à Paris.

Hirsch conducted world premieres also by Georg Friedrich Haas, Helmut Lachenmann and Klaus Ospald. Dedicated to the works by Bernd Alois Zimmermann, he has recorded his orchestral works with the WDR Sinfonieorchester Köln, among others.
