= Fritz Volbach =

German conductor, composer and musicologist

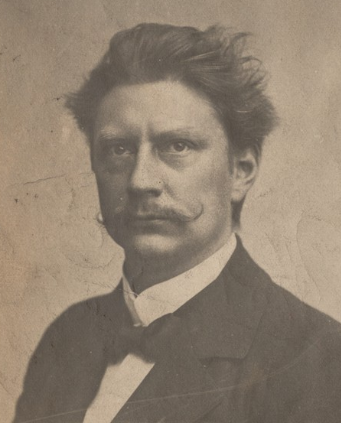
Volbach in 1905

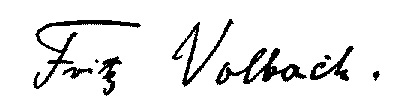

Fritz Volbach (17 December 1861 – 30 November 1940) was a German conductor, composer and musicologist.

== Life ==
Volbach was born in 1861 in Wipperfürth. After he was briefly a pupil of the Rheinische Musikschule with Ferdinand Hiller, he resumed his school education in Bruchsal, where he also passed his Abitur. He studied philosophy at the Ruprecht-Karls-Universität Heidelberg and Rheinische Friedrich-Wilhelms-Universität Bonn. In 1886 he became a pupil of the Royal Institute for Church Music, before continuing his studies with Eduard Grell at the Academy of Arts, Berlin in the composition department; he was probably his last pupil. During his studies in 1885 he became a member of the Akademischer Gesangverein Berlin in the Sondershäuser Verband as well as the AMV Makaria Bonn.

After his studies he worked as a teacher at the Institute for Church Music in 1887; he also conducted the Academic Liedertafel and a choir. In 1891 he became music director in Mainz. In 1899 he received his doctorate from the University of Bonn. In 1907 he became music director in Tübingen and was appointed professor. During the First World War he founded a German symphony orchestra in occupied Belgium with Fritz Brandt under the occupiers in Brussels. From 1918 he taught at the University of Münster and was also music director and director of the music association of Münster until 1925. In 1929 he became Emeritus.

Volbach's compositions include an opera, a symphony and three symphonic poems. His compositions show him to be a conservative late romantic. Some parts of his estate are kept in the Universitätsarchiv der Westfälischen Wilhelms-Universität Münster.

Volbach died in Wiesbaden at age 79.

== Some works ==
- Es waren zwei Königskinder, Symphonic Poem, Op. 21 (1900).
- Quintett für Klavier und Bläser, Op. 24 (1902)
- Raffael. Three mood pictures for choir, orchestra and organ (1902).
- Symphony in B minor, Op. 33 (1909).
- Piano quintet in D minor, Op. 36 (1912).

== Publications ==
- Die Praxis der Händelaufführung. Dissertation, Bonn 1899.
- Georg Friedrich Händel. (Berühmte Musiker - Lebens- und Charakterbilder nebst Einführung in die Werke der Meister. Volume II). 2. Auflage. Schlesische Verlagsanstalt, Berlin 1906.
- Die deutsche Musik im neunzehnten Jahrhundert. Nach der Grundlagen ihrer Entwicklung und ihren Haupterscheinungen. Kösel, Kempten/München 1909.
- Die Instrumente des Orchesters. Ihr Wesen und ihre Entwicklung. (Aus Natur und Geisteswelt, Volume 384). Teubner, Leipzig/Berlin 1913.
- Das moderne Orchester. Volume 1. Das Zusammenspiel der Instrumente in seiner Entwicklung. 2nd edition. Teubner, Leipzig/Berlin 1919.
- Das moderne Orchester. Volume 1: Die Instrumente des Orchesters. 2. Auflage. Teubner, Leipzig/Berlin 1921.
  - Moderni orhestar. Njegov razvitak. Translation into Croatian by Božidar Širola. Edition Slave, Wien 1922.
- Erläuterungen zu den Klaviersonaten Beethovens. Ein Buch für Jedermann. (Tongers Musikbücherei. Volume 12/14). P.J. Tonger, Köln 1924 (3rd edition).
- Beethoven. 2nd edition. Kirchheim & Co, Mainz 1929.
- Handbuch der Musikwissenschaften. Volume 1. Musikgeschichte, Kulturquerschnitte, Formenlehre, Tonwerkzeuge und Partitur. Aschendorffsche Verlagsbuchhandlung, Münster 1926.
- Handbuch der Musikwissenschaften. Volume 2. Ästhetik, Akustik u. Tonphysiologie, Tonpsychologie. Aschendorffsche Verlagsbuchhandlung, Münster 1930.
- Der Chormeister. Ein praktisches Handbuch für Chordirigenten mit besonderer Berücksichtigung des Männerchors. New, extended edition. Schott, Mainz 1936.
- Erlebtes und Erstrebtes. E. Schneider, Mainz 1956.

== Literature ==
- Klaus Hortschansky: Fritz Volbach (1861–1940). Komponist, Dirigent und Musikwissenschaftler. Festschrift zum 60jährigen Bestehen des Musikwissenschaftlichen Seminars der Westfälischen Wilhelms-Universität Münster. (Beiträge zur westfälischen Musikgeschichte 20). v.d. Linnepe, Hagen 1987, ISBN 3-921297-82-6.
- Der Komponist Fritz Volbach erzählt aus seinem Leben. In: Hans Kraus: Alter Bergischer Brauch - in Florenz wiederentdeckt. (Rheinisch-Bergischer Kalender. Volume 36/1966). Heider, Bergisch Gladbach 1965, p. 11–13
