= Wolfgang Gayler =

German conductor and pianist

Wolfgang Gayler (19 December 1934 – 6 October 2011) was a German conductor and pianist.

== Life ==
Gayler was born in Stuttgart. From 1945 to 1954 he attended the Reutlingen college.. He then studied at the University of Stuttgart, the State University of Music and Performing Arts Stuttgart, the Hochschule für Musik Freiburg and the University of Freiburg. He was a scholarship holder of the Studienstiftung.

As répétiteur, he first began in Freiburg im Breisgau. In 1965 he moved to the Staatstheater Nürnberg. In 1977 he became Deputy Music Director and in 1993 Music director of the City of Nuremberg. A guest conducting led him to the Hamburg State Opera in 1984.

In 1958 he shared the 2nd prize for piano of the Kranichsteiner Musikpreis with Gábor Gabos and Rolf Kuhnert.

Gayler died in Nuremberg at age 76.

== Bibliography ==
- Norbert Beleke (publisher): Wer ist wer?. The German Who's Who. 2007/2008. Volume 46, Schmidt-Römhild, Lübeck 2007, ISBN 978-3-7950-2044-6, p. 382.
