= Friedrich Ferdinand Hommel =

German musicologist

Friedrich Ferdinand Hommel (14 July 1929 – 14 November 2011) was a German musicologist.

== Life ==
Hommel was born in Würzburg in 1929 as son of the philologist Hildebrecht Hommel and his wife Charlotte née Schad (1900-1990). After completing his Abitur at the Humanistic Gymnasium in Heidelberg, he studied musicology in Heidelberg and Tübingen from 1948 to 1956 as well as natural sciences at the Technical University of Munich.

For his early and above all continuing interest in all forms of contemporary music, Hommel mentioned as formative influences the suggestions he received during his school days in lessons with the Heidelberg pianist Alwine Moeslinger, a Berlin master pupil of Artur Schnabel, who had been one of the first interpreters of the Donaueschingen Festival in the early 1920s and afterwards was duo partner of the cellist Rudolf Hindemith. Also the personal acquaintance with Wolfgang Fortner and other members of the artist circle around Georgia Wiedemann and Alexander Mitscherlich. Among the musicologists it was especially Carl Dahlhaus as well as the medievalists Georg Reichert and Jacques Handschin, beside the almost equally old Rudolf Stephan from common Heidelberg high school times, to whom he owed fundamental insights into this matter. Hommel came into contact with journalism in 1960 as a volunteer for the feuilleton of the Stuttgarter Zeitung. As successor to Carl Dahlhaus and on his recommendation, he worked there from 1961 as a music critic, later as editor-in-chief and critic of the Frankfurter Allgemeine Zeitung and as programme director for serious and popular music at Südwestfunk in Baden-Baden (today Südwestrundfunk).

From 1960 to 1964 he was music critic and head of the music department of the Stuttgarter Zeitung. From 1981 to 1994 he was director of the International Music Institute Darmstadt. (IMD). During the years of his Darmstadt activities, Hommel considerably expanded the international activities of the institution. For many years the institute represented the Federal Republic of Germany in the World Association of Music Information Centers. In 1985 the central archive of the International Society for New Music (IGNM/ISCM) was established in Darmstadt. Hommel also initiated the first international jazz center in Europe, as the basis for which the city of Darmstadt was able to acquire the private collections of Joachim-Ernst Berendt at Hommel's suggestion.

For many years he was also a member of numerous specialist juries (including the Prix Italia, the Berlin Art Prize, the DAAD, the record edition of the German Music Council for New Music in the Federal Republic of Germany). During the time of his IMD directorship, John Cage, Iannis Xenakis and Morton Feldman were invited to Darmstadt, thus giving a forum once again to long neglected currents. And finally, it was Hommel who gave the institute and the Summer Courses a broad international base, opened the doors of the courses stylistically wide and gave all participants the opportunity to present their work in various forums.

Hommel died in Darmstadt in November 2011 at the age of 82.

== Honours ==
- 1994: Johann-Heinrich-Merck-Ehrung of the city of Darmstadt.

== Literature ==
- The new Grove Dictionary of music and musicians, vol. 8 – London [among others]: Macmillan, 1980
- Michael Custodis: Liberaler Internationalist. Zum Tod des ehemaligen Leiters des Internationalen Musikinstituts Darmstadt, Friedrich Ferdinand Hommel (1929–2011), in Neue Zeitschrift für Musik, Jahrgang 2012, issue 2
