= Friedrich Geiger (musicologist) =

German musicologist

Friedrich Geiger (born in 1966) is a German musicologist.

== Life ==
Born in Munich, Geiger studied music, historical and systematic musicology and Latin philology in Munich and Hamburg. After gaining his PhD in 1997 with a thesis on Wladimir Rudolfowitsch Vogel, he headed the Research and Information Centre for ostracized Music at the Dresden Centre for Contemporary Music from 1997 to 2002. He then lectured at the musicological institutes of the TU Dresden and the University of Hamburg. After his habilitation in 2003 with a study on the persecution of composers under Hitler and Stalin, he was research assistant and lecturer at the musicological seminar of the Free University of Berlin in the Deutsche Forschungsgemeinschaft special research area Aesthetic Experience in the Sign of the Dissolution of Artistic Limits from 2003 to 2007. Since summer semester 2007 he has been teaching as professor for historical musicology at the University of Hamburg.

His research focuses on music history from the 18th century to the present, music of antiquity and ancient reception in music, music in dictatorships, historiography of popular music, geography of music history and music aesthetics and musical judgement.

== Publications ==
- Die Dramma-Oratorien von Wladimir Vogel 1896–1984. Hamburg 1998, ISBN 3-932696-03-4.
- Musik in zwei Diktaturen. Verfolgung von Komponisten unter Hitler und Stalin. Kassel 2004, ISBN 3-7618-1717-7.
- Verdikte über Musik. 1950–2000. Stuttgart 2005, ISBN 3-476-02110-6.
- with Michael Custodis: Netzwerke der Entnazifizierung. Kontinuitäten im deutschen Musikleben am Beispiel von Werner Egk, Hilde und Heinrich Strobel. Münster 2013, ISBN 3-8309-2843-2.
