= Wolfgang Steinecke =

German musicologist

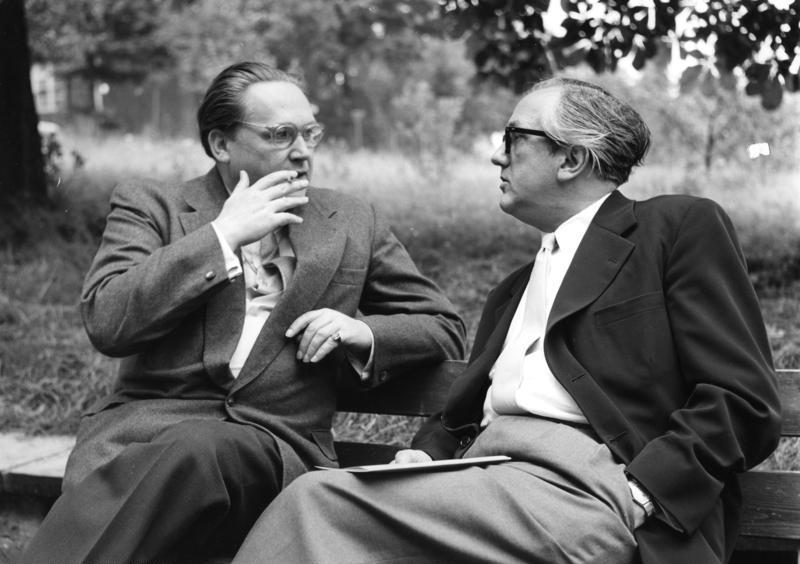
- Wolfgang Steinecke (left) with Heinz Dressel in 1957
- Born: Hans Wolfgang Steinecke; 22 April 1910; Essen
- Died: 23 December 1961 (aged 51); Darmstadt
- Education: Folkwangschule; University of Cologne; University of Kiel
- Occupations: Musicologist; Music critic; Cultural politician
- Organizations: Darmstädter Ferienkurse

Wolfgang Steinecke (22 April 1910 – 23 December 1961) was a German musicologist, music critic, and cultural politician. In Darmstadt, he revived cultural life after World War II, especially by initiating the Darmstädter Ferienkurse, which connected Germany to the international scene of contemporary music.

== Life ==
Hans Wolfgang Steinecke was born in Essen, to Käthe and Hugo Wolfram Steinecke. His father was a full-time Reichsbahn inspector, a music critic for well-known Essen daily newspapers, and a choral conductor. Already as a child, Steinecke wrote poems and a play. He attended a gymnasium in his home town. At the age of 17 he wrote his first composition. From 1927, he wrote incidental music for school theatre performances as well as for productions of the Kiel Student Theatre. Steinecke first completed practical music studies at the Folkwangschule in Essen with Ludwig Riemann (1863–1927) and Felix Wolfes. He then studied musicology with Ernst Bücken, art history, theatre and literature and philosophy at the University of Cologne and the University of Kiel. In 1928, he completed a seventy-page music aesthetic, incorporating ideas by Ferruccio Busoni and Hans Mersmann.

In addition to his studies, he worked as an assistant at the theatre with Georg Hartmann at the Städtische Bühnen Kiel. In 1934 he received his doctorate under Friedrich Blume in Cologne. The title of the dissertation was "The Parody in Music".

During the Nazi regime, Steinecke was related to numerous influential musicians and musicologists, including his doctoral advisor Friedrich Blume, but also Fritz Stein. He worked as a music and theatre critic for the Rheinisch-Westfälische Zeitung in Essen until 1939. He then moved to Darmstadt to work as the editor for southwestern Germany for the Düsseldorf theatre newspaper Der Mittag. He also worked as a correspondent for several daily newspapers. Due to the closure of the German theatres on 1 September 1944, he became unemployed.

After the end of the Second World War he applied in Darmstadt for a job in the new cultural administration of the city of Darmstadt under Mayor Ludwig Metzger. On his application he stated that he was politically unencumbered and made no statements about his activities in the NS time. Also at a later time Steinecke was not subjected to a denazification procedure. On 1 August 1945 he was given a temporary contract of employment as cultural advisor. On 1 December 1945, the American Military Government agreed to employ Steinecke. The employment contract was regularly extended in the following period. He received a salary in the rank of a government councillor. During his time as cultural advisor until 1948 Steinecke rebuilt the cultural administration in the heavily destroyed city of Darmstadt. This included the opening of the municipal library, the Academy of Musical Arts and the Volkshochschule. He also founded a municipal chamber music series and organized the first art exhibitions.

Steinecke is particularly remembered for initiating the Darmstädter Ferienkurse, which began in 1946 as International Summer Courses for New Music, and which were later managed by the Kranichstein Music Institute. They connected Germany again to the in international scene of contemporary classical music which had been cut by the Nazis. The programs was in the early years influenced by musicians and composers such as Hugo Distler, Wolfgang Fortner, Gerhard Frommel and Hermann Reutter. From 1950, Steinecke devoted himself exclusively to the Darmstädter Ferienkurse. He succeeded in bringing many composers, performers and philosophers to meeting in Darmstadt, where the Darmstadt School was born. Theodor Adorno, in an obituary for Steinecke, draws attention to the important bridges he built at Darmstadt between the new generation and the pre-War generation of Schoenberg, Alban Berg, and Anton Webern. and He also worked as a music critic for various newspapers and magazines, including again Der Mittag.

Steinecke was married to the photographer Hella Steinecke née Dahm (1921–1982). The marriage remained childless. Steinecke died as a result of a car accident in Darmstadt on 23 December 1961 at the age of 51. A street in Kranichstein was named after him.

== Publications ==
- 1934: Die Parodie in der Musik, Wolfenbüttel
- 1960: Darmstädter Beiträge zur neuen Musik
- 1961: Kranichstein : Geschichte, Idee, Ergebnisse.
- 2011: Spielmusik : für Violine, Viola und Violoncello = Instrumental music

== Literature ==
- Michael Custodis, commissioned by Internationalen Musikinstituts Darmstadt (IMD): Traditionen Koalitionen Visionen. Wolfgang Steinecke und die Internationalen Ferienkurse in Darmstadt, Saarbrücken 2010.
