= Kurt Honolka =

German musicologist (1913–1988)

- Born: 27 September 1913
- Died: 7 October 1988 (aged 75)
- Education: German University in Prague
- Occupations: Musicologist; Journalist; Music critic
- Organizations: Prager Tagblatt; Stuttgarter Nachrichten

Kurt Honolka (27 September 1913 – 7 October 1988) was a German musicologist, journalist, and music and theatre critic. He is known as a translator of the librettos of Czech operas into German, such as Smetana's Dalibor and Janáček's Osud.

== Career ==
Born in Litoměřice, Bohemia, Honolka studied musicology and law at the German University in Prague, and earned a Ph.D. in law. He worked almost exclusively as a musicologist. He became a member of the Nazi Party in 1939. He published in the daily newspapers Prager Tagblatt and Der neue Tag. From 1941, he wrote war reports (Kriegsberichte), for example Kampfflieger über England. Aus dem Tagebuch einer Kampffliegerstaffel (Fels-Verlag, Essen 1942), and Fliegerkameraden (Fels-Verlag, Essen 1944).

Honolka was a music critic for the Stuttgarter Nachrichten and editor of the Feuilleton section from 1949 to 1963. He also worked as a musicologist and translated several librettos of operas to German, especially those by Czech composers. He tried to revive forgotten works by notable composers by using new, more dramatic texts, for example Weber's Euryanthe and Schubert's Alfonso und Estrella. He also translated songs and choral music. His translation to German of Smetana's Dalibor was used in a new production in 2019 of the Oper Frankfurt.

Honolka received the Order of Merit of Baden-Württemberg in 1980. He was awarded the Schubart-Literaturpreis of the city of Aalen in 1986. He died in Stuttgart on 7 October 1988.

== Works ==
Publications by Honolka are held by the German National Library, including:

=== Books ===
- Das vielstimmige Jahrhundert (1960)
- Musik im 20. Jahrhundert (1960)
- Der Musik gehorsame Tochter (1962)
- Knaurs Weltgeschichte der Musik Droemer Knaur 1968, New edition 1979, ISBN 3-426-03610-X.
- Antonín Dvořák. Mit Selbstzeugnissen und Bilddokumenten Rowohlt 1974. (New edition 2002, ISBN 3-499-50220-8)
- Bedřich Smetana in Selbstzeugnissen und Bilddokumenten Rowohlt, Reinbek 1978, ISBN 3-499-50265-8.
- Die großen Primadonnen. Vom Barock bis zur Gegenwart Heinrichshofen, Wilhelmshaven 1961. (New edition 1982, ISBN 3-7959-0279-7)
- Leoš Janáček. Sein Leben – sein Werk – seine Zeit. Belser, Stuttgart/ Zürich 1982, ISBN 3-7630-9027-4.
- Papageno. Emanuel Schikaneder. Der große Theatermann der Mozart-Zeit. 1984, ISBN 3-7017-0373-6.
- Schubart. Dichter und Musiker, Journalist und Rebell. Sein Leben, sein Werk. Stuttgart 1985, ISBN 3-421-06247-1
- Hugo Wolf – sein Leben, sein Werk, seine Zeit. Deutsche Verlags-Anstalt, Stuttgart 1988, ISBN 3-421-06477-6.

=== Translations of opera librettos to German ===
- Zwei Witwen by Smetana
- Die verkaufte Braut by Smetana
- Dalibor by Smetana
- Die Teufelskäthe by Dvořák
- Osud by Janáček
- Les vêpres siciliennes by Verdi
- Così fan tutte by Mozart
- Die Hochzeit des Figaro by Mozart
- Idomeneo by Mozart
- Amahl und die nächtlichen Besucher by Menotti
- Hilfe, Hilfe, die Globolinks by Menotti

== Literature ==
- Friedrich Herzfeld (1973). Das Lexikon der Musik – Ein Handbuch für den Alltag (6th ed.). Frankfurt am Main: Ullstein. ISBN 3-550-06012-2.
- Der Musik Brockhaus (in German). Mannheim: Brockhaus. 1982. ISBN 3-7653-0338-0.
