= Hans Zender =

German conductor and composer (1936–2019)

- Zender, c. 2000
- Born: Johannes Wolfgang Zender; 22 November 1936; Wiesbaden, Hesse-Nassau, Germany
- Died: 22 October 2019 (aged 82); Meersburg, Baden-Württemberg, Germany
- Education: Hochschule für Musik Frankfurt; Hochschule für Musik Freiburg
- Occupations: Conductor; Composer; Academic
- Organizations: Theater Freiburg; Theater Bonn; Opernhaus Kiel; Deutsche Radio Philharmonie Saarbrücken Kaiserslautern; Hamburg State Opera; Musikhochschule Frankfurt
- Awards: Villa Massimo; Frankfurter Musikpreis; Goethe Prize

Johannes Wolfgang Zender (22 November 1936 – 22 October 2019) was a German conductor and composer who published under Hans Zender. He was the chief conductor of several opera houses, and his compositions, many of them vocal music, have been performed at international festivals.

As a conductor, he worked at the Theater Freiburg, Theater Bonn and the Opernhaus Kiel. He was head of the Hamburg State Opera from 1984 and led the radio orchestra Deutsche Radio Philharmonie Saarbrücken Kaiserslautern from 1999 to 1011. He taught at the Musikhochschule Frankfurt. His opera Stephen Climax premiered in 1986 at the Oper Frankfurt, and his third opera, Chief Joseph, premiered in 2005 at the Staatsoper Unter den Linden.

== Career ==
Born in Wiesbaden on 22 November 1936, Zender attended the Maifestspiele at age 13, listening to concerts conducted by Carl Schuricht, Karl Böhm and Günter Wand, among others. He took piano lessons and learned to play the organ. From 1949, he attended the Darmstädter Ferienkurse each year, where he got to know trends in new music by Karlheinz Stockhausen, Olivier Messiaen and John Cage. He first studied at the Hochschule für Musik Frankfurt, piano with August Leopolder and composition with Kurt Hessenberg. He took private lessons in chorale conducting with Kurt Thomas, and he worked simultaneously as a répétiteur for the Singakademie, conducted by Ljubomir Romansky. He studied further at the Hochschule für Musik Freiburg from 1957 to 1959, piano with Edith Picht-Axenfeld, conducting with Carl Ueter and composition with Wolfgang Fortner.

From 1959 to 1963 Zender was Kapellmeister of the Theater Freiburg. He was awarded the Villa Massimo sholarship for 1963/63, spending the time with Bernd Alois Zimmermann; they became friends and shared a passionate interest in literature, art and philosophy. He was principal conductor at the Theater Bonn from 1964 to 1968. In 1964–65 he attended the Second Cologne Courses for New Music at the Rheinische Musikhochschule, under the artistic direction of Stockhausen. In 1968 he was called to Kiel, where he was Generalmusikdirektor (GMD) of the Opernhaus Kiel until 1972. From 1971, he also was principal conductor of the Radio Symphony Orchestra in Saarbrücken, making it a leading symphony orchestra for new music. The series Musik im 20. Jahrhundert, founded in 1970, was shaped by him and Christof Bitter with many world premieres and German premieres and a focus on music beyond Europe.

In 1984 Zender became head of the Hamburg State Opera and GMD of the orchestra, where Luigi Nono's Intolleranza was premiered in 1985 and was internationally recognised. Zender's opera Stephen Climax, with his own libretto based on James Joyce and Hugo Ball, was premiered on 15 June 1986 at the Oper Frankfurt during the Gielen era, staged by Alfred Kirchner and conducted by Peter Hirsch. From 1987 to 1990, he was chief conductor of the Chamber Orchestra of Radio Netherlands in Hilversum. From 1999 to 2011, he was the permanent guest conductor and a member of the artistic board of the SWR Symphony Orchestra Baden-Baden and Freiburg, now part of the SWR Symphonieorchester.

Zender's third opera, Chief Joseph, based on Chief Joseph, was premiered in June 2005 at the Staatsoper Unter den Linden, staged by Peter Mussbach and conducted by Johannes Kalitzke.

From 1988 until 2000, Zender taught composition at the Hochschule für Musik und Darstellende Kunst in Frankfurt. Among his students was Isabel Mundry. Invited by Walter Fink, he was in 2011 the 21st composer featured in the annual Komponistenporträt of the Rheingau Musik Festival. Music in a chamber concert included denn wiederkommen (Hölderlin lesen III) for string quartet and speaking voice (1991) and Mnemosyne (Hölderlin lesen IV) for female voice, string quartet, and tape (2000), performed by Salome Kammer and the Athena Quartet. A symphony concert was given by the SWR Vokalensemble and SWR Symphonieorchester conducted by Emilio Pomàrico, including Schubert-Chöre, featuring Zender's adaptations of four Schubert choral works with orchestral rather than the original piano accompaniment, written in the 1980s.

Zender died on 22 October 2019 in Meersburg, Germany.

== Compositions ==
Many of Zender's works were published by Breitkopf & Härtel. The published works are held by the German National Library, including:

- Canto I–VI for various forces
  - I: for choir, flute, piano, strings and percussion (1965)
  - II: for soprano, choir and orchestra on a text by Ezra Pound (1967)
  - III: for soprano, tenor, baritone, ten instruments and live-electronics on texts by Cervantes (1968)
  - IV: for 16 voices and 16 instruments (1969/72)
  - V: for voices with optional percussion (1972/74)
  - VI: for bass-baritone, a capella mixed choir, and optional tape (1988)
- 3 Rondels nach Mallarmé (3 Rondels after Mallarmé) for alto, flute and viola (1966); words by Stéphane Mallarmé
- Modelle for variable forces (1971–73)
- Zeitströme for orchestra (1974)
- Elemente, tape montage for two loudspeaker groups (1976)
- Hölderlin lesen I for string quartet with sprechstimme (1979); words by Friedrich Hölderlin
- Hölderlin lesen II for sprechstimme, viola, and live-electronics (1987); words by Friedrich Hölderlin
- "denn wiederkommen" (Hölderlin lesen III) for string quartet and sprechstimme (1991)
- Mnemosyne (Hölderlin lesen IV) for female voice, string quartet, and tape (2000)
- Fünf Haiku (LO-SHU IV) for flute and strings (1982)
- Dialog mit Haydn for two pianos and three orchestral groups (1982)
- Stephen Climax, opera (1979–84, premiered in 1986)
- Don Quijote de la Mancha, opera (1989–91, premiered in 1993; new version 1994, premiered in 1999)
- Schuberts "Winterreise" — Eine komponierte Interpretation for tenor and small orchestra (1993)
- Shir Hashirim—Lied der Lieder (Canto VIII), oratorio for soli, choir, orchestra, and live-electronics (1992/96, complete première in 1998)
- Schumann-Fantasie for large orchestra (1997)
- Chief Joseph, on the life of Chief Joseph, musical theatre in three acts (premiered in 2005)

== Writings ==
- Zender, Hans. 2004. Die Sinne denken. Texte zur Musik 1975-2003. Edited by Jörn Peter Hiekel. Wiesbaden: Breitkopf & Härtel. ISBN 3-7651-0364-0 (a nearly complete edition of Zender's writings)
- ———.1999. "A Road Map for Orpheus?" In Theory into Practice: Composition, Performance, and the Listening Experience. Collected writings of the Orpheus Institute 2. Edited by Peter Dejans. Leuven: Katholieke Universiteit Leuven. ISBN 90-6186-994-3
- ———. 1991. Happy New Ears. Das Abenteuer, Musik zu hören. Freiburg im Breisgau: Herder. ISBN 3-451-04049-2
- ———. 1998. Wir steigen niemals in denselben Fluß. Wie Musikhören sich wandelt. Second edition. Freiburg im Breisgau: Herder. ISBN 3-451-04511-7

== Awards ==
Zender's awards include:

- 1963/64: Villa Massimo scholarship
- 1968/69: Villa Massimo second scholarship
- 1980: Kunstpreis des Saarlandes
- 1997: Frankfurter Musikpreis
- 1997: Goethe Prize of Frankfurt
- 2002: Hessian Cultural Prize
- 2011: Preis der Europäischen Kirchenmusik
