= Hochschule für Musik Freiburg =

Music school in Germany

Coordinates: 47.989069°N 7.872515°E

- Type: Public
- Established: 1946
- Principal: Ludwig Holtmeier
- Faculty: 75
- Students: c. 550
- Location: Schwarzwaldstraße 141, Freiburg im Breisgau, Freiburg im Breisgau, Baden-Württemberg, Germany
- Website: www.mh-freiburg.de

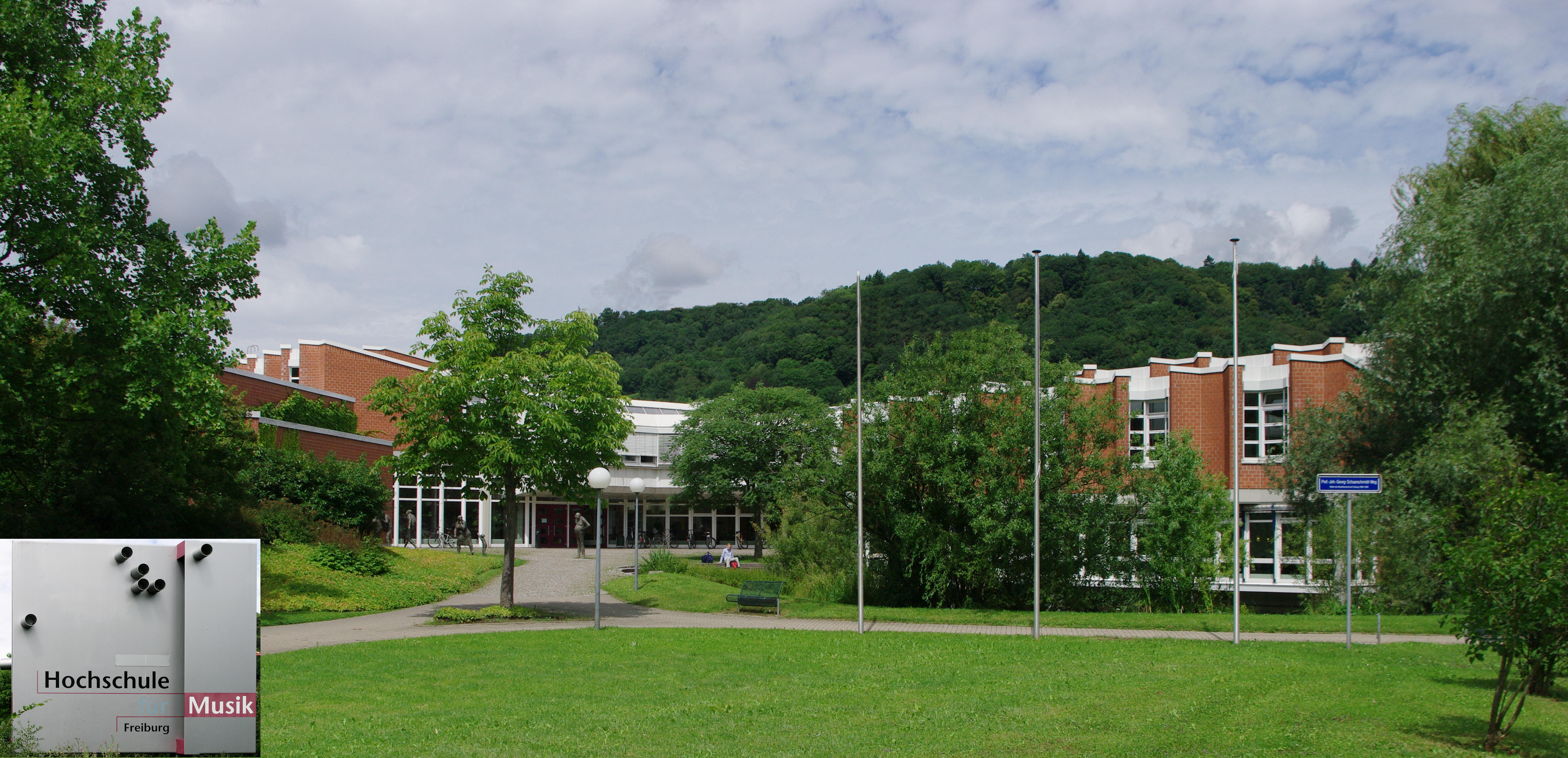
The Hochschule für Musik Freiburg

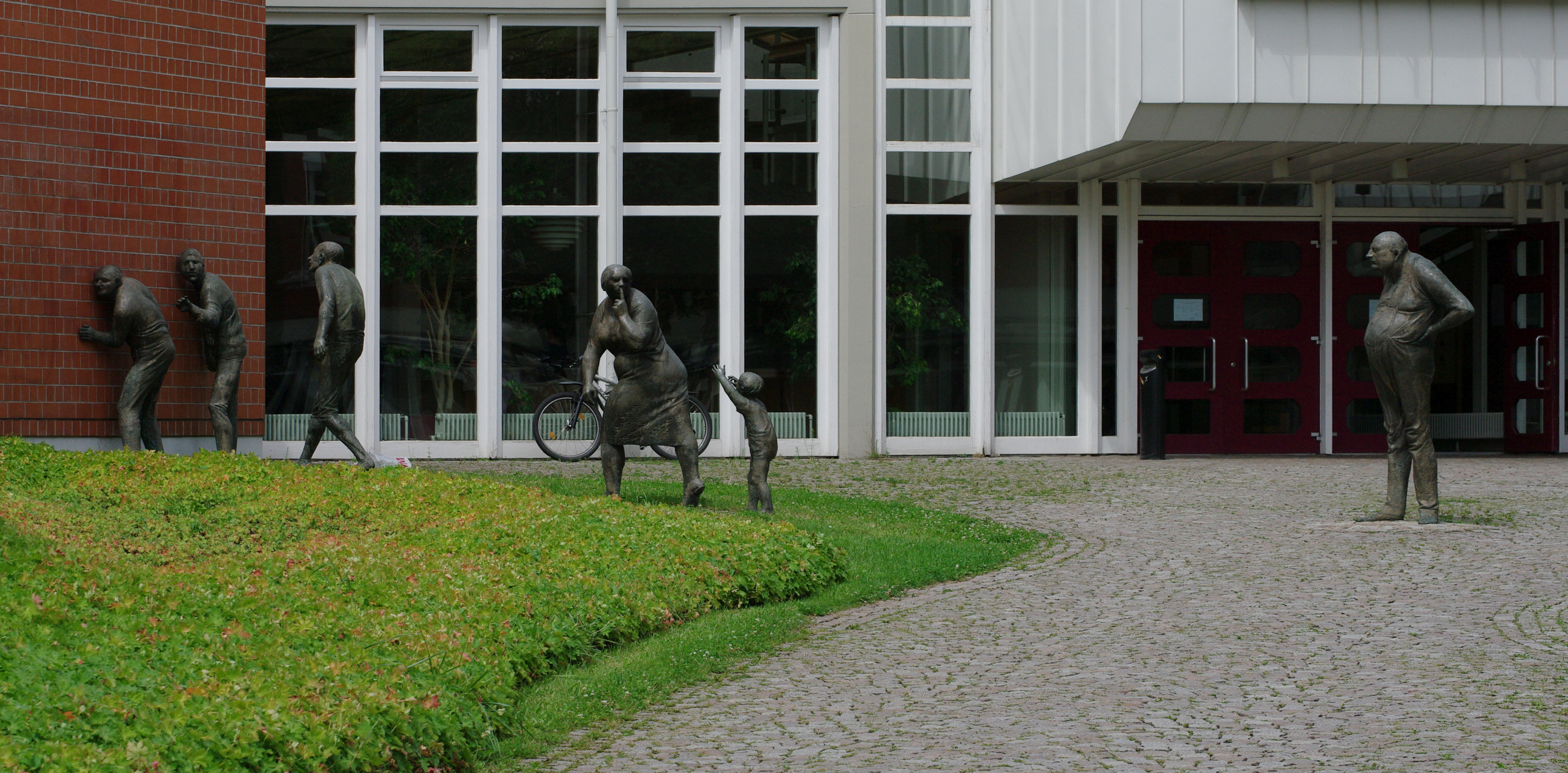
Art at the main entrance of the Hochschule für Musik

The Hochschule für Musik Freiburg ("University of Music Freiburg" or "Freiburg Conservatory of Music") is a public music academy subsidized by the State of Baden-Württemberg for academic research and artistic and pedagogical training in music.

== History ==
The Hochschule was initially founded as a municipal institution in 1946 under the direction of Gustav Scheck, but two years later became an institution of the State of Baden (part of Baden-Württemberg since 1952). The original facilities were two intact townhouses in Freiburg's largely destroyed city center. Many of the early students went on to become renowned musicians, including the tenor Fritz Wunderlich. Numerous outstanding instrumental soloists and teachers have taught at the Hochschule, including Harald Genzmer, Aurèle Nicolet, Ulrich Koch, Wolfgang Marschner, Ludwig Doerr, Carl Seemann, Erich and Elma Doflein, Edith Picht-Axenfeld and James Avery.

In 1954 Wolfgang Fortner founded the pioneering Institut für Neue Musik (Institute for New Music) at the Hochschule and later began a cooperation with the experimental electronic studio of the Heinrich-Strobel Foundation at the Freiburg branch of the Südwestfunks (now the Südwestrundfunk).

Following many years of being housed in numerous buildings throughout the city, the Hochschule erected a new state-of-the-art facility in 1983.

Since the fall of 2005, the Hochschule has collaborated with the Universitätsklinikum Freiburg (Freiburg University Hospital) through the newly founded "Freiburger Institut für Musikermedizin" (Freiburg Institute for Musicians' Medicine) in order to research, teach, and promote specialized patient care based on the often overlooked connection between music making and health.

The Hochschule maintains international partnerships with the music conservatories in Odesa (Ukraine), Rochester (USA), Warsaw (Poland), Sydney and Kyoto (Japan).

== Notable teachers and students ==
- Robert Aitken
- Stefan Ammer
- James Avery
- Tanja Ariane Baumgartner
- Maria Bengtsson (soprano)
- Harald Genzmer
- Bernd Glemser
- Gottfried von der Goltz
- Wilfried Gruhn
- Stanislav Heller
- Robert Hill
- Ernst Horn
- Robert D. Levin
- Éric Le Sage
- Aurèle Nicolet
- Heinz Holliger
- Edith Picht-Axenfeld
- Anthony Plog
- Jean-Guihen Queyras
- Wolfgang Rihm
- Linus Roth
- Tibor Szász
- Carl Ueter
- Jörg Widmann
- Christoph Wolff
- Fritz Wunderlich
- Hans Zender
- Simone Zgraggen

== Courses of study ==
Since the beginning of the 2006/07 winter semester, the Hochschule was one of the first German music conservatories to provide most of its courses in line with the proposed European Bachelor/Master system.

- Bachelor/Master's degree
- Diplom/Künstlerische Ausbildung (Artist Diploma)
- Diplom/Musiklehrer (Music teacher diploma)
- Music Education
- Master of Music
- Master of Performance
- Master of Contemporary Music Performance
- Advanced Studies Diploma
- Soloist Diploma
- Aufbaustudium Kirchenmusik A (Church Music)
- Doctoral Studies

The Hochschule is divided organizationally into five institutes: new music, musical theater, historical performance practice, the Freiburg Institute for Performing Arts Medicine, and the Freiburg School for the Gifted.
