= Anton Lukoszevieze =

British-Lithuanian cellist, composer and artist (born 1965)

Anton Lukoszevieze (born 1965) is a British-Lithuanian cellist, composer and visual artist. He is the director of the ensemble Apartment House, who are known for their advocacy of experimental and avant-garde music and frequent international performances. He is an alumnus of the Royal College of Music.

Lukoszevieze has premiered and commissioned new works for cello by many contemporary composers, including Christian Wolff, Christopher Fox, Gerhard Stäbler, Amnon Wolman, Laurence Crane, Jack Sheen, Richard Ayres, Phill Niblock, Jennifer Walshe, Julius Aglinskas, Claudia Molitor, Arturas Bumšteinas, Ričardis Kabelis, Richard Emsley, Rytis Mažulis, James Saunders, Alwynne Pritchard, Peter Eötvös, Bryn Harrison, Karlheinz Essl and Zbigniew Karkowski.

== Apartment House ==
Lukoszevieze founded Apartment House in 1995. The ensemble's name is taken from John Cage's piece Apartment House 1776. The group has a flexible line-up, changing according to the repertoire being performed. Lukoszevieze is the only constant member, although other musicians have been regular members since the ensemble's formation, such as the pianists Philip Thomas and Kerry Yong, violinists Gordon MacKay and Mira Benjamin, viola player Bridget Carey, clarinettist Heather Roche and percussionist Simon Limbrick.

The ensemble has commissioned over one hundred new works by international composers, given the UK premiere of over one hundred further works, and performed at venues and festivals including Wigmore Hall, Café Oto, the Serpentine Gallery, Queen Elizabeth Hall, Copenhagen Contemporary, Blank Forms NYC, Fruitmarket Gallery, Turner Contemporary, MaerzMusik, Wien Modern, Ultima Festival, and Witten New Music Days.

Apartment House were awarded a Royal Philharmonic Society Award for outstanding contribution to chamber music in 2012.

In 2015, 20th anniversary celebrations for the ensemble included a broadcast on BBC Radio 3, and concerts at the Huddersfield Contemporary Music Festival and London's Wigmore Hall, with commissions from composers Egidija Medekšaite, Leo Chadburn, Martin Arnold, Jobina Tinnemans, Vitalija Glovackyte and Cassandra Miller.

In 2020 they were appointed as an Associate Ensemble of the Wigmore Hall, London.

The ensemble has recorded many albums for the label Another Timbre, including discs of music by Linda Catlin Smith, Cassandra Miller, John Cage, Morton Feldman, Ryoko Akama, Georgia Rodgers, John Lely, Tim Parkinson, Luiz Henrique Yudo, James Saunders and Julius Eastman, besides albums of music by John Cage, David Dunn, Philip Corner, Christian Wolff, Michael Parsons, James Weeks and Cornelius Cardew for labels such as Matchless, Huddersfield Contemporary Records, The Trilogy Tapes, Sawyer Editions and Setola di Maiale.
