= Bryn Harrison =

British experimental composer (born 1969)

Bryn Harrison (born 1969 in Bolton, England) is a British experimental composer. His works have been widely performed by international ensembles and he was a recipient of the 2013 Paul Hamlyn Foundation Award for Composers. He is currently Reader in Composition at the University of Huddersfield.

His music deals with ideas of repetition and memory by using "recursive musical structures" and sometimes extended durations, such as the 45-minute ensemble work Repetitions in Extended Time (2008) and the 76-minute piano piece Vessels (2013).

== Education ==
Harrison initially studied at the Leeds College of Music (1988–91), before completing a master's degree under composer Gavin Bryars at De Montfort University, Leicester. In 1999 he was selected to compete for the Gaudeamus International Composers Award in the Netherlands. He also studied briefly with Christian Wolff and Alvin Lucier in 2001 at the Ostrava Days in the Czech Republic. He was awarded a PhD degree by the University of Huddersfield in 2007.

== Career ==
Harrison established an early relationship with the Huddersfield Contemporary Music Festival, where his music was presented in 1993 and 1995, before he received festival commissions in 1999 and was the festival's featured composer in 2008. Ensembles and soloists who have performed his music include Ensemble recherche, Klangforum Wien, the London Sinfonietta, the London Symphony Orchestra, Apartment House, Plus-Minus, Asamisimasa, ELISION, EXAUDI, the pianists Philip Thomas and Mark Knoop, and the violinist Aisha Orazbayeva.

== Style ==
Harrison's work is influenced by the music of Morton Feldman. Feldman and Harrison's works share a general quietness and contemplativeness, a static texture and a concern with repetition or, in Harrison's words, "use of recursive musical forms which challenge our perceptions of time and space by viewing the same material from different angles and perspectives." Other composers for whom Harrison has expressed an admiration include John Cage, Laurence Crane, Tim Parkinson, James Saunders, Richard Glover, Howard Skempton, Christopher Fox, Linda Catlin Smith, Martin Arnold, and Cassandra Miller.

Harrison has also been influenced by visual artists such as Brice Marden, Agnes Martin, James Hugonin and the painter and printmaker Mike Walker, with whom he has collaborated. The artwork of Bridget Riley has been an especially important source for Harrison's work, in works such as Six Symmetries (2004), in which Harrison traced musical notation from geometric contours similar to those in Riley's 1960s paintings.

== Significant works ==
- Passing Light (2014) for ensemble and electronics. 40-minute work commissioned by the London Sinfonietta for the Spitalfields Festival.
- Receiving the Approaching Memory (2014) for violin and piano. 40-minute work for violinist Aisha Orazbayeva and pianist Mark Knoop, released on the label Another Timbre.
- Vessels (2012) for piano. Revised to a 76-minute version in 2013, released on the label Another Timbre.
- Surface forms (repeating) (2009) for ensemble. Written for ELISION.
- Repetitions in Extended Time (2008) for ensemble. 43-minute work commissioned by Plus Minus.
