= Tim Parkinson =

British experimental musician

Tim Parkinson (born 7 July 1973) is a British experimental composer, pianist and curator. His music has been commissioned and performed by ensembles including Apartment House, the Basel Sinfonietta and the London Sinfonietta, and soloists including Anton Lukoszevieze and Rhodri Davies. It has been broadcast on BBC Radio 3, Resonance FM, WDR3 (Germany), and Radio SRF 2 Kultur (Switzerland). He is co-curator (alongside composer John Lely) of the concert series Music We'd Like to Hear, which has run since 2005, having previously organised concerts at the British Music Information Centre in London from 1997 onwards.

== Education ==
Parkinson attended Bedford School before studying at Worcester College, Oxford and privately in Dublin with Kevin Volans, and participating in the Ostrava Days 2001. In 2011 he was visiting Professor of Composition at the Janáček Academy of Music and Performing Arts in Brno and has taught at Ashmole Academy. In 2018 he was appointed a creative fellow at the Samuel Beckett Research Centre at the University of Reading.

== Style and career ==
His music has also been described as consisting of "melodious, somewhat Sixties sounds", inspired by an older generation of British experimental composers, such as Michael Parsons. His music exhibits a collage approach, often juxtaposing the sounds of found objects, various kinds of musical material, or snippets of speech. Parkinson himself has described his compositional methods as follows:

What I want beforehand for myself is a large and unforeseen diversity of pitches and intervals – randomness, patterns, shapes – and of course there are countless ways to generate pitches… I’m quite inclusive about what pitches or intervals are presented – I like consonance and dissonance – so sometimes a sequence of notes might be reminiscent of other music, and of course it might not be reminiscent of anything to me, but it might to others… Often I have used the page as a structural unit, like a movement or a panel, and allowed the players to choose their own order of pages for a performance.

Parkinson has also written music for installation art projects, such as sixty eight sounds for Welborne (2005), untitled installation (for Sound 323) (2003), for a London record shop, and ten brass for St. George's Gardens, Bloomsbury, commissioned by the London Borough of Camden.

Much of Parkinson's music has utilitarian titles, such as orchestra piece (2012) or is untitled, such as untitled violin and piano (2000) and untitled (winter 2002) and his official website has the domain name www.untitledwebsite.com.

Since 2003, he has been one half of a duo, Parkinson Saunders, with composer James Saunders, performing mostly indeterminate music, using "any sound-producing means" (objects not usually considered musical instruments, such as cardboard boxes, paper cups or wind-up toys), seated at two tables "like newsreaders". Parkinson also performs as solo pianist and occasionally plays (as pianist) with ensembles Apartment House, and Plus-Minus, at venues that have included Tate Modern, the Barbican Centre, and the Huddersfield Contemporary Music Festival.

== Recordings ==
Recordings of Parkinson's music have been released on labels including Edition Wandelweiser, Another Timbre, Metier and Lorelt.

His album Pleasure Island was released by the label Slip Imprint in May 2019. This is Parkinson's first work explicitly conceived as an album and is titled after the 'Paese dei balocchi' (Land of Toys) in Carlo Collodi's The Adventures of Pinocchio (1883), translated in the 1940 Disney film adaptation as 'Pleasure Island'.

Parkinson's second solo album Here Comes A Monster was released in May 2020 on Cafe Oto's Takuroku imprint, founded to distribute music made during the COVID-19 pandemic. It features guest vocals by a wide range of artists and musicians, including John Lely, Juliet Fraser, Angharad Davies, Dominic Lash, Laurence Crane, Mira Benjamin, Steve Beresford, Rhodri Davies, James Saunders, JG Thirlwell, and Richard Dawson.

== Time With People ==
Parkinson's opera, Time With People (2012–13) has been widely staged by various international companies, and received performances in London, Huddersfield, Los Angeles, Chicago, Oberlin, Ohio, New York (by Object Collection) and Brussels. A French translation has been staged in La Chaux-de-Fonds and a German language version is in preparation for 2019.

The opera is largely performed without typical musical instruments, on a stage strewn with rubbish, which is also used as a sound source, alongside the sounds of walking, speech, clapping, humming, and musical recordings. It has been described by reviewers as "robotic incantations... [and] scenes of meaningless actions enacted amongst piles of garbage", "theatre of the absurd in eight scenes" and "what opera might be like if you removed music and orchestra".
