= Karen Tanaka =

Japanese composer (born 1961)

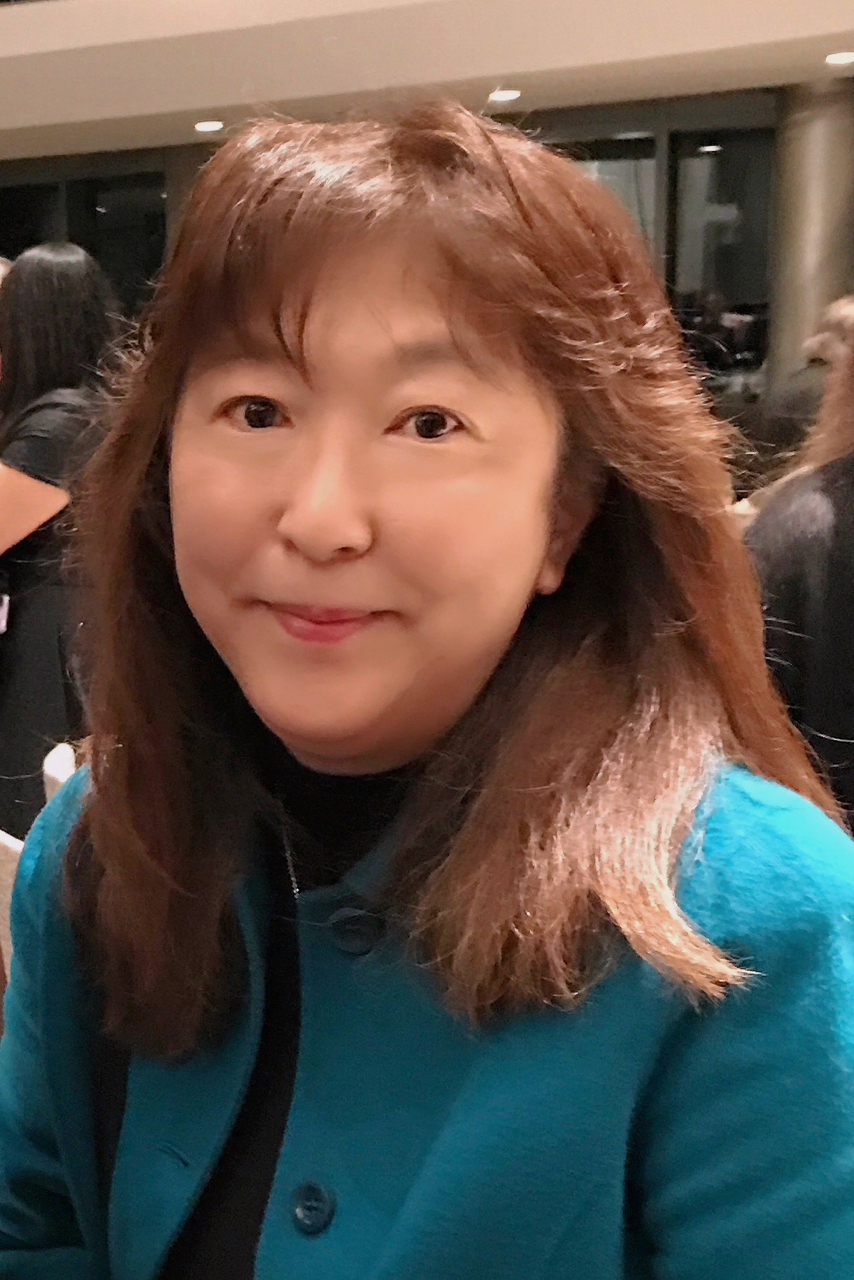
- Karen Tanaka (composer)

Background information
- Born: Karen Tanaka; 7 April 1961 (age 64); Tokyo, Japan
- Genres: Contemporary classical, Film Music
- Occupation: Composer
- Instruments: piano, keyboard, synthesizer, personal computer
- Years active: 1984–present

Karen Tanaka (born April 7, 1961) is a Japanese composer.

== Biography ==
Karen Tanaka was born in Tokyo where she started piano and composition lessons as a child. After studying composition with Akira Miyoshi and piano with Nobuko Amada at Toho Gakuen School of Music in Tokyo, she moved to Paris in 1986 with the aid of a French Government Scholarship to study with Tristan Murail and work at IRCAM as an intern. In 1987, she was awarded the Gaudeamus International Composers Award at the International Music Week in Amsterdam. She studied with Luciano Berio in Florence in 1990–91 with funds from the Nadia Boulanger Foundation and a Japanese Government Scholarship. In 1996, she received the Margaret Lee Crofts Fellowship at the Tanglewood Music Center. In 1998, she was appointed as Co-Artistic Director of the Yatsugatake Kogen Music Festival, previously directed by Toru Takemitsu. In 2005, she was awarded the Bekku Prize. In 2024, Karen Tanaka was appointed Composer-in-Association at Malmö Live Concert Hall & Malmö Symphony Orchestra for the 2025–27 seasons.

In 2012, Tanaka was selected as a fellow of the Sundance Institute’s Composers Lab for Feature Film where she was mentored by Hollywood's leading composers. In 2016, she served as an orchestrator for the BBC's TV series, Planet Earth II. She has scored numerous short films, animations, and documentaries. Sister, one of the animated films she scored, was selected for prestigious film festivals including Sundance, Annecy, Ottawa, and nominated for the 92nd Academy Awards for Best Animated Short Film in January 2020.

Her works have been performed by distinguished ensembles and orchestras worldwide, including the BBC Symphony Orchestra, Los Angeles Philharmonic, Baltimore Symphony Orchestra, Berkeley Symphony Orchestra, Netherlands Radio Symphony Orchestra, Norwegian Chamber Orchestra, NHK Symphony Orchestra in Tokyo, Orchestre Philharmonique de Radio France, Brodsky Quartet, BIT20 Ensemble, Gothic Voices, Anúna, among many others. Various dance companies, including the Nederlands Dans Theater, have also featured her music.

Tanaka has received numerous commissions from, most notably, the Royal Academy of Music, the Juilliard School, Radio France, the Canada Council for the Arts for Eve Egoyan, the Arts Council of England for Brodsky Quartet, the BBC Symphony Orchestra conducted by Kazushi Ono, the Michael Vyner Trust for the NHK Symphony Orchestra conducted by Esa-Pekka Salonen, Jane Dutcher for Joan Jeanrenaud and the Berkeley Symphony Orchestra conducted by Kent Nagano, and the National Endowment for the Arts for the Rochester Philharmonic Orchestra conducted by Peter Bay.

Her love of nature and concern for the environment has influenced many of her works, including Questions of Nature, Frozen Horizon, Water and Stone, Dreamscape, Ocean, Silent Ocean, Tales of Trees, Water Dance, Crystalline series, and Children of Light.

Tanaka taught composition at the University of California, Santa Barbara, and the University of Michigan, Ann Arbor. Her music is published by Chester Music in London (Wise Music Group), Schott Music New York (PSNY), ABRSM in the UK and Editions Bim in Switzerland. She lives in Los Angeles and teaches composition at California Institute of the Arts.

== Major works ==
=== Orchestral ===
- Anamorphose (1986), for piano and orchestra
- Departure (1999–2000)
- Echo Canyon (1995)
- Echoing Souls (2025)
- Guardian Angel (2000), for clarinet, harp, percussion and string orchestra
- Hommage en cristal (1991), for piano and string orchestra
- Initium (1992–93), for orchestra and electronics
- Lost Sanctuary (2002)
- Prismes (1984)
- Rose Absolute (2002)
- Techno Etudes IV (2024), for piano and orchestra
- Urban Prayer (2003–04), for cello and orchestra
- Water of Life (2012–13)
- Wave Mechanics (1994)

=== Chamber ===
- Always in my heart (1999), for clarinet and piano
- At the grave of Beethoven (1999), for string quartet
- Dreamscape (2001), for 7 instruments
- Enchanted Forest (2013), for horn and piano
- Frozen Horizon (1998), for 7 instruments
- Holland Park Avenue Study (2002), for 5 instruments
- Invisible Curve (1996), for 5 instruments
- Metal Strings (1996), for string quartet
- Ocean (2003), for violin and piano
- Once Upon a Time (2021), for flute and piano
- Polarization (1994), for 2 percussionists
- Shibuya Tokyo (2009), for 2 violins
- Silent Ocean(2005), for trumpet and piano
- Techno Etudes III (2022), for 2 pianos and 2 percussionists
- Water and Stone (1999), for 8 instruments
- Wind Whisperer (2019), for flute, viola and harp

=== Piano/Harpsichord ===
- Blue Crystal (2014), for piano
- Children of Light (1998–99), for piano
- Crystalline (1988), for piano
- Crystalline II (1995–96), for piano
- Crystalline III (2000), for piano
- Herb Garden (2005), for piano four hands
- Jardin des herbes (1989, rev. 1995), for harpsichord
- Lavender (1989), for harpsichord
- Lavender Field (2000), for piano
- Love in the Wind (2017), for piano
- Masquerade (2013), for piano
- Northern Light (2002), for piano
- Our Planet Earth (2010–11), for piano
- Rose Crystal (2022), for piano
- Sensation (2022), for piano
- Techno Etudes (2000), for piano
- Techno Etudes II (2020), for piano
- The Adventures of Anya (2021–23), for piano
- Water Dance (2008), for piano
- Who Stole the Tarts? (2016), for piano
- The Zoo in the Sky (1994–95), for piano

=== Solo instrumental ===
- Aube (2020), for cello, narration and electronics
- L'Éternité (2021), for violin and electronics
- Lilas (1988), for cello
- Metallic Crystal (1994–95), for metallic percussion and electronics
- Night Bird (1996), for alto saxophone and electronics
- The Song of Songs (1996), for cello and electronics
- Tales of Trees (2003), for marimba
- Wave Mechanics II (1994), for violin and electronics

=== Electroacoustic ===
- Celestial Harmonics (1997)
- Inuit Voices (1997)
- Questions of Nature (1998)

=== Choral ===
- God is Love as Love is God (2009)
- God Loves Us All (2009)
- Rise Up Hallelu (2009)
- Sleep Deeply (2018)
- Sleep My Child (2012)
- Wait for the Lord (2009)

=== Sound design ===
- Opening Bell for Daiichi Seimei Hall (2000)
- Viva Suntory! for Suntory Hall (2010)

== Discography ==
- At the grave of Beethoven (Vanguard Classics – 992120), Brodsky Quartet
- Children of Light (BMG – BVCC 37200), Ikuyo Nakamichi, piano
- Crystalline (EVE0104), Eve Egoyan, piano
- Crystalline (2L – 074 SACD), Signe Bakke, piano
- Crystalline II (CRI – CD855), Xak Bjerken, piano
- Crystalline II (2L – 074 SACD), Signe Bakke, piano
- Frozen Horizon (New World Records – 80683), Azure Ensemble
- Initium (Camerata – 32CM319), Tokyo Symphony Orchestra; Kazuyoshi Akiyama, conductor
- Invisible Curve (New World Records – 80683), Azure Ensemble
- Jardin des herbes (Albany Records – TROY1049), Calvert Johnson, harpsichord
- Lavender Field (MET – CD 1053), Thalia Myers, piano
- Love in the Wind (Octavia Records – TRITON OVCT-00175), Yuko Nakamichi, piano
- Metallic Crystal (Mode Records 189-192), Roland Auzet, percussion
- Night Bird (BIS – CD890), Claude Delangle, alto saxophone
- Night Bird (First Hand Records – FHR13), Gerard McChrystal, alto saxophone
- Night Bird (La Cupula Music), David Hernando Vitores, alto saxophone
- Northern Light (USK – 1227 CDD), Thalia Myers, piano
- Our Planet Earth (Sony – SICC 1575), Ikuyo Nakamichi, piano
- Prismes (BIS – CD490), Malmö Symphony Orchestra; Junichi Hirokami, conductor
- Shibuya Tokyo (Composers Concordance – COMCON0042), Mioi Takeda and Lynn Bechtold, violins
- Silent Ocean (CRYSTON OVCC-00040), Osamu Kumashiro, trumpet; Kazumasa Watanabe, piano
- The Song of Songs (New Albion Records – NA 120), Joan Jeanrenaud, cello
- The Song of Songs (Albany Records – TROY726), Medeleine Shapiro, cello
- The Song of Songs (trptk – TTK0011), Maya Fridman, cello
- Techno Etudes (BVHAAST – 1000), Tomoko Mukaiyama, piano
- Techno Etudes (2L – 074 SACD), Signe Bakke, piano
- Water and Stone (New World Records – 80683), Azure Ensemble
- Water Dance (2L – 074 SACD), Signe Bakke, piano
- Water Dance (Nami Records – WWCC 7708), Kayako Matsunaga, piano
- Wave Mechanics (Deutsche Grammophon – POCG 1860), Ensemble Kanazawa
- Wave Mechanics II (Albany Records – TROY1305), Airi Yoshioka, violin
- The Zoo in the Sky (BMG – BVCC 1094), Ikuyo Nakamichi, piano
