= List of compositions by Michael Finnissy =

The following is a partial list of compositions by Michael Finnissy.

== Orchestral music, with or without choir ==
- World (1968/74), for 6 voices, 2 flutes (both doubling piccolo and the second alto flute), 2 oboes (one doubling oboe d'amore, the other cor anglais), 2 clarinets (the second doubling E♭ clarinet), 2 piccolo trumpets, trombone, tuba, 3 percussionists, cimbalom, celesta, 2 pianos, harp, 2 violins, 2 violas, 2 cellos, 2 double basses [19']
- Medea (1973/2008), 5 voices and orchestra [6']
- Offshore (1975–76), for 3 flutes, 3 oboes, 3 clarinets, 3 bassoons, 4 horns, 3 trumpets, 3 trombones, 1 tuba, 3 percussionists, harpsichord, piano, 2 harps, and strings (12.10.8.6) [11']
- Sea and Sky (1979–80), for 4 flutes (2 doubling piccolo), 3 oboes, 2 clarinets (both doubling E♭ clarinet), 2 bassoons (the second doubling contrabassoon), 4 horns, 4 trumpets (each doubling piccolo trumpet), 3 trombones, tuba, timpani, 4 percussionists, 2 celestas, 2 harps, and strings (10.10.10.8.8) [22']
- East London Heys (1985–86), for string orchestra [40']
- Red Earth (1987–88), for 3 flutes, 3 oboes, 3 bassoons, 3 trumpets, 3 trombones, 2 didjeridus, 4 percussionists, 2 timpani, 2 harps, and strings [20']
- Eph-phatha (1988–89), for 2 flutes, oboe, clarinet, bassoon, horn, trumpet, trombone, percussion, harp, piano, and strings (3.3.3.3.1) [13']
- Glad Day (1994), for 2 recorders, 2 trumpets, chamber organ, theory or harp, and strings [13']
- Speak its Name! (1996), for 2 flutes, 2 oboes, 2 clarinets, 2 bassoons, 2 horns, 2 trumpets, trombone, 2 vibraphones, timpani, harp, quarter-tone keyboard, and strings (at least 8.8.6.6.3) [22']
- Onbevooroordeeld Leven (2000–02), for soloists (2 flutes, clarinet, drummer, accordion, and string quartet) and ensemble (2 oboes, clarinet, 2 bassoons, 2 horns, and strings (at least 2.2.2.2.1)) [23']
- Zortziko (2009), version ii, for orchestra [6']
- Mozart Requiem Completion (published 2013), for SATB soli, SATB choir, and chamber orchestra (2 basset horns, 2 bassoons, 2 trumpets in D, 3 trombones (alto, tenor, and bass), timpani, organ, and strings) [56']
- Remembrance Day (2013/14), for solo baritone, SATB choir, and orchestra (clarinet, basset horn, 2 bassoons, 2 trumpets, 3 trombones, 3 percussionists, piano, harp, and strings) [65']
- Janne (2015), for 2 flutes, 2 oboes, 2 clarinets, 2 bassoons, 4 horns, 2 trumpets, 3 trombones, glockenspiel, timpani, and strings [16']
- Mu-Fa (2016), for 2 groups, each consisting of flute, oboe, clarinet, bassoon, horn, trumpet, trombone, tuba, piano, vibraphone, and strings [15']
- Natural Behavior (2016–17), for piccolo, 2 flutes, 2 oboes, cor anglais, 2 clarinets, bass clarinet, 2 bassoons, 4 horns, 3 trumpets, 3 trombones, tuba, timpani, 3 percussionists, harp, piano, and strings [6']

== Ensemble music (8+ players) ==
- Song 2 (1968), for 2 flutes, 2 oboes, 2 clarinets, 2 bassoons, horn, 2 trumpets, and 3 cellos [4']
- Song 4 (1968), for 2 solo pianos, 2 flutes, 2 oboes, 2 bassoons, 2 trumpets, and 3 cellos [4']
- Song 10 (1971), for piccolo, oboe, cor anglais, 2 clarinets, contrabassoon, piano, electric organ, and 2 cellos [4']
- Piano Concerto No. 1 (1975/84), for solo piano, piccolo, flute, oboe, clarinet, bassoon, 2 horns, 2 trombones, celesta, 2 violins, viola, cello, and double bass [15']
- Piano Concerto No. 2 (1975–76), for solo piano, 2 alto flutes, 3 violins, 2 violas, 2 cellos, and 2 double basses [14']
- Pathways of Sun and Stars (1976), for 2 piccolos, oboe, 2 clarinets, bassoon, 3 horns, 3 trumpets, 3 trombones, 5 percussionists, 2 harps, violin, viola, cello, and double bass [20']
- Alongside (1979), for flute, oboe, clarinet, bassoon, horn, trumpet, trombone, percussion, piano, 2 violins, viola, cello, and bass [19']
- Teangi (1982), for flute (doubling piccolo), cor anglais, E♭ clarinet, clarinet, contrabassoon, 2 trumpets, percussion, vibraphone, celesta, and violin [6']
- Ouraa (1982–83), for piccolo, clarinet, bassoon, horn, trumpet, trombone, percussion, violin, viola, cello, and double bass [9']
- Câtana (1984), for flute, oboe, clarinet, percussion, piano, harp, violin, viola, and cello [16']
- Obrecht Motetten I (1988–89), for flute, clarinet, bassoon, trumpet, trombone, percussion, violin, viola, and cello [5']
- Obrecht Motetten III (1989), for solo viola, flute, oboe, clarinet, bassoon, horn, trumpet, trombone, percussion, 2 violins, cello, and double bass [9']
- Obrecht Motetten V (1991–92), for flute (doubling piccolo), 3 soprano saxophones, horn, 3 trumpets, 3 trombones, double bass, and piano [18']
- Various Nations (1992), for speaker, flute, clarinet, horn, percussion, guitar, violin, and cello [12']
- Mars + Venus (1993), for flute, oboe, clarinet, bassoon, horn, trumpet, trombone, vibraphone, piano, 2 violins, viola, cello, and double bass [14']
- L'Union Libre, (1997), for alto horn (or alto saxophone), 2 pianos, 3 ocarinas, viola, accordion, 2 detuned zithers, and 4 large drums [11']
- I'm on my Way (1998), for clarinet, bassoon, horn, trumpet, trombone, percussion, piano, violin, viola, cello, and double bass [6']
- Giant Abstract Samba (2002), version i, for solo clarinet and ensemble (flute, oboe, bassoon, contrabassoon, soprano saxophone, tenor saxophone, horn, 2 trumpets, trombone, bass trombone, tuba, and percussionist) [17']
- Greatest Hits Of All Time (2003), for solo oboe, piccolo, clarinet, hammer, violin, viola, cello, and piano [12']
- Fredener Lieder (2015), for small string orchestra (2 first violins, 2 second violins, 3 third violins, 2 violas, 2 cellos, and 1 double bass) [12']

== Chamber music (2–7 players) ==
- Cantet nunc aula caelestium (1962), for flute and piano [4']
- Afar (1966–67), for flute, cor anglais, 3 trumpets, percussion, and celesta [13']
- As when upon a tranced summer night (1966–68), for piano, percussion, and 3 cellos [18']
- Transformations of the vampire (1968–71), for clarinet, 3 percussionists, violin, and viola [14']
- Untitled piece in memory of Igor Stravinsky (1971), for flute, viola, and harp [6']
- Babylon (1971/2001), for flute, clarinet, violin, viola, cello, piano, and percussion [6']
- Evening (1974), for alto saxophone, horn, trumpet, percussion, harp, cello, and double bass [11']
- Lost Lands (1977), for E♭ clarinet, soprano saxophone, guitar, violin, and piano [20']
- Piano Concerto No. 3 (1978), for solo piano, oboe (doubling cor anglais), clarinet (doubling bass clarinet), 2 trombones, cello, and double bass [23']
- Kagami-Jishi (1979), for flute and harp [11']
- Nobody's Jig (1980–81), for string quartet [20']
- Jiseï (1981), for solo cello, flute, oboe, percussion, viola, and piano [9']
- Keroiylu (1981), for oboe, bassoon, and piano [8']
- Aijal (1982), for flute, oboe, and percussion [7']
- Banumbirr (1982/86), for flute, clarinet, violin, cello, and piano [9']
- Mississippi Hornpipes (1982/97), for violin and piano [10']
- Dilok (1982), for oboe and percussion [10']
- Independence Quadrilles (1982/95), for piano trio [8']
- Australian Sea Shanties, Set 3 (1983), for 3–4 recorders [10']
- Delal (1984/88), for oboe d'amore and percussion [9']
- String Quartet No. 1 (1984) [22']
- above earth's shadow. . . (1985), for solo violin, flute (doubling piccolo), clarinet, violin, viola, cello, and double bass [18']
- East London Heys (1985–86), version for string quartet [40']
- East London Heys (1985–86), version for wind quintet [40']
- Contretänze (1985–86), for flute, oboe, clarinet, percussion, violin, and cello [17']
- String Trio (1986) [30']
- Quabara (1988), for didjeridu and "junk percussion" [9']
- Obrecht Motetten II (1988), for mandolin, guitar, and harp [10']
- Obrecht Motetten IV (1990), for brass quintet (2 trumpets, horn, trombone, and tuba) [12']
- Kulamen Dilan (1990), for soprano saxophone or oboe, and percussion [10']
- In Stiller Nacht (1990/97), for piano trio [9']
- Two Motets (1991), for counter-tenor and guitar [8']
- Plain Harmony (1993), version ii, for string quartet [10']
- Quelle (1994), for 2 soprano saxophones and 2 contrabass saxophones [3']
- Traum des Sängers (1994), for clarinet, guitar, vibraphone, violin, viola, cello, and double bass [15']
- Sefauchi's Return (1994), for flute, oboe, clarinet, and piano [2']
- Violet, Slingsby, Guy and Lionel (1994–96), for 2 euphoniums and 2 tubas [7'] (arranged from the larger piece for piano, multiple players)
- Different Things (1996), for clarinet quintet [6']
- Selected Movements of Great Masters (1996), for 2 alto saxophones and 2 tenor saxophones [11']
- Sehnsucht (1997), for string quartet [4']
- Multiple forms of constraint (1997), for solo violin and string trio [14']
- Un chant d'amour par JEAN GENET (1999–2000), for piano trio [26']
- Two Uncharacteristic Marches with a Trio (1999–2000), for wind quintet [3']
- Bright Future ignoring Dark Past (1999–2000), for piano trio [4']
- Necessary and more detailed thinking (2000), for piano trio [3']
- Judgement in that day (2000), for oboe, clarinet, violin, viola, cello, and piano [8']
- Casual Nudity (2000–01), for bass flute, percussion, guitar, double bass, and piano [12']
- Kreuzfidel Polka Op. 301 by Johann Strauss II (2000), for violin, cello, double bass, piano, and percussion [4']
- Shady Love (2001), for horn, violin, cello, piano, and percussion [4']
- Regen beschreiben (2001), for alto flute, clarinet, violin, cello, and piano [2']
- Smallish Foxtrot (2001), for flute, violin, viola, double bass, piano, and percussion [1']
- Open Window (2001), for trumpet, double bass, and piano [9']
- 'k zal u (2001), for piano trio [4']
- D'Woaldbuama: Einleitung und Pastorale in Ländlerstyl nach Johann Strauss (sohn) (2001), for clarinet, violin, cello, double bass, piano, and percussion [7']
- Kritik der Urteilskraft (2001), for flute, clarinet, violin, cello, and piano [29']
- À propos de Nice (2001–02), for piano trio [24']
- Alternative Readings (2002), for flute, cello, and piano [8']
- Giant Abstract Samba (2002), version ii, for clarinet, violin, cello, piano, and percussion [17']
- Springtime (2003), for flute, clarinet, violin, cello, and piano [15']
- Diamond Suburbia (2003), for alto flute, clarinet, violin, harp, and piano [2']
- Blancmange (2003), for clarinet, guitar, phonofiddle, and piano [4']
- June (2003), for piano trio [4']
- Kann Liebe ewig bestehen? (2003), for alto flute, bass clarinet, trombone, violin, cello, and piano [8']
- Six Sexy Minuets Three Trios (2003), for string quartet [20']
- Civilisation (2004/13), for string quartet [17']
- L'Herbe (2004), for clarinet, guitar, quarter-tone vibraphone, and nude actor [11']
- Judith Weir (2004), for piano trio, and melodica or similar [5']
- That ain't Shit (2004), for clarinet, violin, piano, and optional drum-kit [12']
- Venice Vipers (2004), for solo violin, accompanied by guitar, violin, cello, and harpsichord [19']
- Young Brethren (2005), for clarinet, bass clarinet, violin, cello, piano, and percussion [11']
- Manik Asie (2005), for flute, guitar, and percussion (glockenspiel and vibraphone) [1']
- Scotch Tape (2006), for clarinet (or violin), cello, and piano [3']
- Possession (du condamné) (2006), for clarinet (or violin), cello, and piano [10']
- Jive, for violin and piano [1']
- Second String Quartet (2006–07) [14']
- Ho' Hoane (2007), for string quartet and piano [1'] (also for piano 4-hands)
- Grieg Quintettsatz (2007), for string quartet and piano [25']
- Clarinet Sonata (2007), for clarinet and piano [12']
- Violin Sonata (2007), for violin and piano [25']
- Bassoon Sonata (2007), for bassoon and piano [12']
- Yob Cultcha (or 'Keep taking the Tabloids') (2007–08), for mandolin, violin, and accordion [3']
- Piano Quartet in G minor, 1861 (2009), for violin, viola, cello, and piano [18']
- Piano Quartet in A major, 1861–2 (2009), for violin, viola, cello, and piano [24']
- De Allerheiligste Ledematen (2010), for violin, viola, cello, and piano
- Âwâz-e Niyâz (premièred 2012), for new oboe (doubling lupophon) and piano [55']
- Piano Quintet in B♭ major (EG 118) (published 2013), a completion of an unfinished Grieg work [30']
- Continuation and Coda to the unfinished Contrapunctus in The Art of Fugue (2013), version i, for string quartet [6']
- Continuation and Coda to the unfinished Contrapunctus in The Art of Fugue (2013), version ii, for piano trio [6']
- Horn Trio (2013), for violin, horn, and piano [30']
- Mad Men in the Sand (2013), for string quartet [3']
- Chi Mei Ricercari (published 2015), for cello and piano [28']
- Don't insult our intelligence (2015), for flute, trombone, violin, viola, double bass, and piano [4']
- Basic Ragtime (published 2016), for 3 violins, cello, and piano [17']
- Clarinetten-Liederkreis (2016), for clarinet and string quartet [14']
- Einfältiger-Liederkreis (2016), for clarinet (or violin) and piano [14']
- Normal Deviates (2017), for two guitars [10']
- Sorrow and its beauty (2017), for erhu and piano [12']
- Opera of the Nobility (2017), for soprano saxophone, percussion, and piano [15']
- Tussen Rede en Gevoel (In between Reason and Feeling) (2018) 2 bass clarinets, violoncello, double bass [19']

== Solo piano music ==
- Song 5 (1966–67) [7']
- Song 8 (1967) [11']
- Romeo and Juliet are drowning (1967–73) [4']
- Strauss-Walzer (1967–1989) [10']
  - "Wo di Zitronen bluhn"
  - "O, schöner Mai"
  - "Geschichten aus dem Wienerwald"
- Song 6 (1968, rev. 1996) [3']
- Autumnall (1968–71) [5']
- Song 9 (1968) [7']
- Song 7 (1968-69) [4']
- 23 Tangos (1968–98) [45']
- Snowdrift (1972) [10']
- Freightrain Bruise (1972–80) [3']
- Verdi Transcriptions (1972–2005) [180']
  - Book 1
    - Oberto. Atto II. Aria: 'Sciagatura! a questo lido ricercai l'amante infido!'
    - Un giorno di regno. Atto I. Trio: 'Bella speranza in vero'
    - Nabucco. Parte II. Chorus: 'Il maledetto no ha fratelli'
    - I Lombardi. Atto III. Chorus: 'Fra tante sciagure...'
    - Ernani. Parte I. Septet with Chorus: 'Vedi come il buon vegliardo...'
    - I due Foscari. Atto III. Choral Barcarolle: 'Iace il vento, è quèta l'onda'
    - Giovanna d'Arco. Atto I. Aria: 'So che per via di triboli'
    - Alzira. Atto II. Duet: 'Il pianto..l'angoscia..di lena mi priva'
    - Attila. Atto I. Aria: 'Mentre gonfiarsi l'Anima'
  - Book 2
    - X. Attila. Prologo. Duetto: 'Vanitosi! Che abietti e dormenti'
    - XI. Macbeth. Atto IV. Coro: 'Patria oppressa! Il doce nome...' (1847)
    - XII. I masnadieri. Parte III. Duetto: 'Qual mare, qual terra...'
    - XIII. Jérusalem. Acte I. Récit et duo: 'Non, ce bruit, ce n'est rien...'
    - XIV. Il corsaro. Atto I. Romanza: 'Non so le tetre immagini'
    - XV. La battaglia di Legnano. Atto IV. Inno di Vittoria: 'Dall'Alpi a Caridi e echeggi vittoria!'
    - XVI. Luisa Miller. Atto II. Scena e quartetto: 'Rea fucina d'empie frodi...'
    - XVII. Stiffelio. Atto III. Duetto: 'Opposto è il calle che in avvenire'
    - XVIII. Rigoletto. Atto I. Scena e coro: 'Vendetta del pazzo! Contr'esso un rancore'
  - Book 3
    - XIX. Rigoletto. Atto III. Canzone: 'La donna è mobile'
    - XX. Il trovatore. Atto IV, prima scena. Duo: 'Vivrà! Contende il giubilo'
    - XXI. La Traviata. Atto III. Duetto: 'È nulla, sai?'
    - XXII. Les vêpres siciliennes. Acte V, scène II. Boléro: 'Merci, jeunes amies, d'un souvenir si doux!'
    - XXIII. Simon Boccanegra. Finale dell'atto I. Scena: 'Tradimento!'
    - XXIV. Aroldo. Atto IV. Coro, Burrasca e Finale: 'Allora che gl'anni...'
    - XXV. Un ballo in maschera. Atto I. Stretta: 'Ogni cura si doni al diletto'
    - XXVI. La forza del destino. Atto I. Romanza: 'Me pellegrina ed orfano'
    - XXVII. Macbeth. Atto II. Aria (a) 'Trionfai! Securi alfino' (1847); (b) 'La luce langue' (1864–5)
  - Book 4
    - XXVIII. Macbeth. Atto I. Chorus: 'S'allontanarono! N'accozzeremo'
    - XXIX. Don Carlos (1866–7). (a) Acte II, tableau II. Duo: 'Restez! Auprès de ma personne'; (b) Acte IV, tableau I. Duo: 'J'ai tout compris'
    - XXX. Aida. Atto III. Romanza: 'O cieli azzuri...'
    - XXXI. String Quartet. (a) III. Prestissimo; (b) IV. Scherzo Fuga
    - XXXII. Simon Boccanegra. Atto II. Aria: 'Cielo, pietoso, rendila'
    - XXXIII. Don Carlo. Atto V. Aria: 'Tu che la vanità conoscesti'
    - XXXIV. Otello. Finale dell'atto III. (a) Ballet No. 3: 'Chanson grecque (Cancone greca); (b) Scena: 'Una gran nube turba'
    - XXXV. Falstaff. Parte I dell'atto III. 'Brava! Quelle corna saranno la mia gioia!'
    - XXXVI. Messa da Requiem. Requiem aeternam
- Svatovac (1973–74) [2']
- Ives – Grainger – Nancarrow
  - Ives (1974) [4']
  - Grainger (1979) [4']
  - Nancarrow (1980) [4']
- Gershwin Arrangements (1975–88) [40']
  - How long has this been going on?
  - Things are looking up
  - A foggy day (in London Town)
  - Love is here to stay
  - They can't take that away from me
  - Shall we dance?
  - But not for me
  - Fidgety feet
  - Embraceable you
  - Waiting for the sun to come out
  - Innocent ingenue baby
  - Blah, blah, blah
  - Boy wanted
- Jazz – Fast Dances, Slow Dances – Boogie-Woogie
  - Jazz (1976) [5']
  - Fast Dances, Slow Dances (1978–79) [18']
  - Boogie-Woogie (1980/96) [4']
- Three Dukes went a-Riding (1977/96), [4']
- English Country-Tunes (1977/82–85), [52']
  - "Green Meadows" [11']
  - "Midsummer Morn" [5']
  - "I'll give my Love a Garland" [10']
  - "May and December" [7']
  - "Lies and Marvels" [4']
  - "The seeds of Love" [4']
  - "My bonny boy" [7']
  - "Come beat the Drums and sound the Fifes" [4']
- all.fall.down (1977) [8']
- To & Fro (1978/95) [4']
- Kemp's Morris (1978), "for pianist wearing Morris-bells" [5']
- We'll get there someday (1978) [3']
- Piano Concerto No. 4 (1978/96) [20']
- Short but. . . (1979) [3']
- Piano Concerto No. 6 (1980–81) [12']
- Liz (1980–81) [1']
- Free Setting (1981/95) [8']
- Reels (1980–81) [8']
- White Rain (1981) [5']
- Stomp (1981) [9'] (also for accordion)
- Terekkeme (1981–90) [5'] (also for harpsichord)
- Hikkai (1982–83) [5']
- Australian Sea Shanties, Set 2 (1983) [3']
- B.S.–G.F.H. (1985–86) [4']
- Taja (1986) [5']
- Wee Saw Footprints, "plus appendix of four teaching pieces and juvenilia" (1986–90) [15']
- Lylyly li (1988–89) [8']
- Pimmel (1988–89) [3']
- Stanley Stokes, East Street 1836 (1989/94) [3']
- More Gershwin (1989–90) [34']
  - Limehouse Nights
  - Wait a bit, Susie
  - I'd rather Charleston
  - Isn't it wonderful?
  - Nobody but you
  - Swanee
  - Dixie Rose
  - Someone believes in you
  - Nashville nightingale
- Sometimes I. . . (1990) [3']
- Can't Help Lovin' Dat Man (1990) [12']
- Two of Us (1990) [2']
- My Love Is Like a Red Red Rose (1990) [3']
- De toutes flours (1990) [4']
- William Billings (1990–91) [4']
- New Perspectives on Old Complexity (1990–92) [5']
- How dear to me (1991) [3']
- Vanèn (1991) [3']
- Rossini (1991) [3']
- There never were such hard times before (1991) [2']
- French Piano (1991) [6']
- Willow Willow (1991) [2']
- Cibavit eos (1991–92) [3']
- Poor Stuff (1991–96) [2']
- Nine Romantics (1992) [25']
- Wenn wir in höchsten Nöten sein (1992) [4']
- A solis ortus cardine (1992) [2']
- John Cage (1992) [3']
- Cozy Fanny's Tootsies (1992) [2']
- What the meadow-flowers tell me (1993) [3']
- Folklore I–IV (1993–94) [78']
  - Folklore I for Edvard Grieg [12']
  - Folklore II for Michael Tippett [30']
  - Folklore III for Brian Ferneyhough [20']
  - Folklore IV for Rodney Lister [16']
- The larger heart, the kindlier hand (1993) [1']
- . . .desde que naçe (1993) [1']
- Yvaroperas (1993–95) [20']
  - Yvaroperas 1 and 2
  - Yvaroperas 3 and 4
  - Yvaropera 5
- Elephant (1994) [2']
- Violet, Slingsby, Guy and Lionel (1994–96) [18']
- Ethel Smyth (1995) [4']
- The History of Photography in Sound (1995–2001) [328']
  - I. Le démon de l'analogie [28']
  - II. Le réveil de l'intraitable réalité [21']
  - III. North American Spirituals [24']
  - IV. My parents' generation thought War meant something [36']
  - V. Alkan – Paganini [14']
  - VI. Seventeen Immortal Homosexual Poets [34']
  - VII. Eadweard Muybridge – Edvard Munch [26']
  - VIII. Kapitalistisch Realisme (mit Sizilianische Männerakte en Bachsche Nachdichtungen) [68']
  - IX. Wachtend op de volgende uitbarsting van repressie en censuur [17']
  - X. Unsere Afrikareise [31']
  - XI. Etched bright with sunlight [29']
- Tracey and Snowy in Köln (1996) [2']
- Honky Blues (1996) [4']
- Georghi Tutev (1996/2002) [6']
- Tu me dirais (1996) [3']
- meeting is pleasure, parting a grief (1996) [1']
- Enough (2001) [17']
- Deux Airs de Geneviève de Brabant (Erik Satie) (2001)
- Edward (2002) [2']
- Joh.Seb.Bach (2003) [3']
- Von Gloeden Postcards (2003)
- Erscheinen ist der herrliche Tag (2003) [3']
- One Minute W... (2006) [1']
- First Political Agenda (1989–2006) [22']
  - Wrong place, wrong time [3']
  - Is there any future for new music? [9']
  - You know what kind of sense Mrs. Thatcher made. [10']
- Zwei Deutsche mit Coda [8']
- Sonata for Toy Piano (2006–07) [6'] (also for toy piano)
- Second Political Agenda (2000–08)
  - ERIK SATIE like anyone else (2000–01) [20']
  - MIT ARNOLD SCHOENBERG (2002) [23']
  - SKRYABIN in itself (2007–08) [21']
- Preambule zu "Carnival," gefolgt von der ersten und zweiten symphonischen Etüde nach Schumann (2009/10) [11']
- Koralforspill (2012) [33']
- Z/K (2012) [13']
- Beat Generation Ballads (2013) [47']
  - Lost But Not Lost [2']
  - Naked Original Skin Beneath Our Dreams & Robes of Thought [3']
  - Lonely Banna Strand [6']
  - Evans, Harry, Scott, Hearts Foolish [2']
  - Veränderungen [34']
- Beethoven's Robin Adair (2015) [25']
- Brahms-Lieder (2015) [12']
- Third Political Agenda (2016)
  - Corruption, Deceit, Ignorance, Intolerance
  - Hier kommt 'U K Ichbezogen Populismus'
  - My country has betrayed me
- written with Cassandra Miller, Sinner don't let this Harvest pass (2016)
- Vervollständigung von Schuberts D840 (2016/17) [25']
- Could I Sing With Angels (2018) [3']
- Fifth Political Agenda (2020) [12']
  - The Emptiness of What Comes Before
  - Utopian Systems
  - Leek Dumplings

== Piano music, multiple players ==
- Wild Flowers (1974), for 2 pianos [12']
- Duet (1975–2007), for piano 4-hands [10']
- Violet, Slingsby, Guy and Lionel (1994–96), "22 short pieces for beginners and their teachers" [18'] (selections also for 2 euphoniums and 2 tubas)
- his voice / was then / here waiting (1996), for 2 pianos [8']
- Eighteenth-Century Novels (Fanny Hill) (2006), for 2 pianos [20']
- Ho' Hoane (2007), for piano 4-hands [1'] (also for string quartet and piano)
- Deux jeunes se promènent à travers le ciel 1929 (2008), for piano 4-hands [3']
- Fem ukarakteristiske marsjer med tre tilføyde trioer (2008–09), for piano 4-hands [15']
- Stille Thränen (2009), for piano 4-hands [8']
- Zortziko (2009), version i, for piano 4-hands [6']
- Derde symfonische etude (2013), for 2 pianos [15']

== Other solo instrumental music ==
- Untitled Piece (1967), for flute [6']
- Xunthaeresis (1967), for organ [7']
- First Sign A Sharp White Moon, as if the cause of Snow (1968–75), for solo alto flute
- Song 13 (1971), for violin [3']
- Song 12 (1972–76), for bass clarinet [4']
- Alice (1970/75), for double bass [6']
- Ru Tchou (1975), for drummer [9']
- Song 17 (1976), for guitar [4']
- Song 18 (1976), for double bass [3']
- All the trees they are so high (1977), for violin [5']
- Doves Figary, version i (1976–77), for cello [7']
- Doves Figary, version ii (1981), for cello [7']
- Pavasiya (1979), for oboe d'amore [8']
  - part of Pavasiya – Sikangnuqa – Talawva
- Sikangnuqa (1979), for flute [8']
  - part of Pavasiya – Sikangnuqa – Talawva
- Hinomi (1979), for percussion [8']
- Stomp (1981), for accordion [9'] (also for piano)
- Andimironnai (1981), for cello [9']
- Yalli (1981), for cello [10']
- Terekkeme (1981–90), for harpsichord [5'] (also for piano)
- Marrngu (1982), for E♭ clarinet [8']
- Nasiye (1982), for guitar [8']
- Gerhana (1981–82), for percussion [12']
- Cirit (1982), for C clarinet [7']
- Sepevi (1982–83), for double bass [9']
- Ulpirra (1982–83), for bass flute [4']
- Uzundara (1983), for B♭ clarinet [9']
- The Eureka Flag (1983), for piccolo [4']
- Ének (1990), for violin [9']
- Organ Symphony No. 1 (2002–03) [18']
- Organ Symphony No. 2 (2003–05) [16']
- Sing to me of Heaven (2005–07), for organ [3']
- Sonata for Toy Piano (2006–07), for toy piano [6'] (also for standard piano)
- Organ Symphony No. 3 (1962–64/2006–08) [16']
- Organ Symphony No.4 (2006–08) [24']
- Two scenes from 'Shameful Vice' (published 2007), for harp [6']
- Bryd frem mit hjertes trang (2009), for organ [4']
- En krybbe er hans første eie (2009), version i, for organ [5']
- Midt Igjennem Nød Og Fare Veien Går Til Paradis, for organ [5']
- 'Dum transissent Sabbatum' double (2016-18), for organ [7']
- 'Videte Miraculum' double (2016-18), for organ [6']
- Mankind Remix I (2020) for bass clarinet [3]

== Vocal music ==
- Le Dormeur du Val (1963–68), for mezzo-soprano, celesta, harpsichord, piano, 2 violins, viola, and cello [7']
- From "The Revelations of Saint John the Divine" (1965-70), for high soprano, flute, 2 violins, 2 violas, and 2 cellos [7']
- Horrorzone (1965, rev. 1987), for soprano, flute, cor anglais, vibraphone, and piano [8']
- Song 1 (1966), for soprano [4']
- Song 3 (1969), for soprano, cor anglais, horn, piano, and electric organ [3']
- Song 11 (1969–71), for soprano and clarinet [4']
- Folk Song Set (in memory of Percy Grainger) (1969–76)
  - For version i [15'], see vocal music accompanied by ensemble.
  - version ii, for mezzo-soprano, flute, clarinet, violin, viola, cello, and piano [13']
  - version iii, for mezzo-soprano, flute, oboe, piano, and percussion [13']
- Irma Cortez (1970–76), for baritone, silent actors, bassoon, percussion, accordion, piano, harp, violin, and double bass [30']
- Song 15 (1971/73), for soprano [4']
- Tsuru-Kame (1971–73), for soprano or contralto, small female choir, flute, viola, and 2–3 percussionists [21']
- Commedia dell'incomprensibile potere che alcune donne hanno sugli uomini (1973–75), for soprano, countertenor, cello, and harpsichord [12']
- Orfeo (1974) [6']
  - version i, for 6 voices, 3 trombones, 2 lutes, percussion, and double bass
  - version ii, for mezzo-soprano
- Bouffe (1975), for voice [5']
- Song 14 (1975), for soprano [4']
- Tom Fool's Wooing (1975–78), for high soprano, 3 sopranos, mezzo-soprano, 2 contraltos, counter-tenor, 2 tenors, and 2 basses [20']
- Song 16 (1976), for soprano [5']
- Mystery 1, "The Parting of Darkness From Light" (1976), for 2 tenors, 2 baritones, and bass [16']
- Mine Eye Awake (1977) [6']
- Mystery 3, "Noah and the Great Flood" (1978), for tenor, 2 actors, alto recorder, cor anglais, and 3 percussionists [16']
- Ohi! ohi! ohi! (1978), for voice [5']
- Mountainfall (1978), for mezzo-soprano [8']
- Goro (1978), for tenor, flute, clarinet, harp, violin, viola, and cello [20']
- Sir Tristran (1978), for soprano, clarinet, piano, violin, viola, and cello [20']
- Mystery 4, "The Prophecy of Daniel" (1979), for soprano, alto, tenor, and bass [15']
- Talawva (1979), for mezzo-soprano, flute, oboe, piano, and percussion
- . . . fairest noonday . . . (1979), for tenor and piano [8']
- Piano Concerto No. 5 (1980), for solo piano, mezzo-soprano, flute (doubling alto flute), oboe (doubling oboe d'amore), and vibraphone [22']
- Lord Melbourne (1980), for soprano, clarinet, and piano [12']
- Green Bushes (1980), for contralto and piano [12']
- Duru-Duru (1981), for mezzo-soprano, flute, piano, and percussion [9']
- Kelir (1981), for 2 sopranos, contralto, tenor, baritone, and bass [17']
- Anninnia (1981–82), for soprano and piano [11']
- Warara (1982/91), for soprano, flute, clarinet, percussion, violin, and cello [9']
- Lyrics and Limericks (1982–84), for voice and piano [10']
- Le Lay de la Fonteinne (1983/90), for mezzo-soprano, flute (doubling piccolo), oboe, and vibraphone or piano [22']
- Soda Fountain (1983), for soprano, mezzo-soprano, contralto, and tenor [20']
- Botany Bay (1983–89), for mezzo-soprano, flute, and oboe or clarinet [4']
- Cabaret Vert (1985), for mezzo-soprano, flute, cor anglais, and percussion [10']
- Beuk o'Newcassel Sangs (1988), for soprano, clarinet, and piano [12']
- Unknown Ground (1989–90), for baritone and piano trio [25']
- Same as We (1990), version ii, for mezzo-soprano, alto flute, and cimbalom [10']
- The Cambridge Codex (1991), for soprano, flute (doubling piccolo), percussion (2 bells), violin, and cello [18']
- Seven Sacred Motets (1991), for soprano, alto, tenor, and bass [35'] (also for SATB choir)
- Three Motets, Two Interludes (1991/2006), for soprano and string trio [16']
- "Western Wind" Kyrie (1991), for soprano, alto, tenor, and bass [3'] (also for SATB choir)
- Liturgy of Saint Paul (1991–95), countertenor, 2 tenor, baritone, and chamber organ [37']
- Thérése Raquin (1992/2005), for 2 countertenors, 2 baritones, and piano [120']
- Blessed be [5']
  - version i, for soprano, double bass, and piano (1992)
  - version ii, for tenor, flute, horn, guitar, harp, and cello (1995)
  - version iii, for soprano, recorder, and piano (1996)
- Silver Morning (1993), for tenor or baritone, piano, and string quartet [16']
- Shameful Vice (1995), for 2 sopranos, mezzo-soprano, tenor, baritone, bass, 2 clarinets, 2 trumpets, guitar, harp, 2 violins, and double bass [45']
- Not Afraid (1998), for baritone and speaking pianist [12']
- Whitman (2004–05), for voice and piano [60']
- Salomé (2002), for soprano and piano [3']
- Now (2005), for 2 sopranos, alto, tenor, and 2 basses [4']
- Brighton! (2005–06), for tenor and string quartet [16']
- Caithness with Descants (2007), for soprano, recorder, and piano [3']
- Outside Fort Tregantle (2007–08), for baritone and piano [3']
- En krybbe er hans første eie (2009), version ii, for soprano, clarinet, guitar, cello, piano, and percussion [5']
- Gesualdo: Libro Sesto (2012–13), for 2 sopranos, 2 altos, 2 tenors, and 2 basses [31']
- Hier ist mein Garten (2015), for soprano and piano [8']
- Andersen-Liederkreis (2016), for soprano and piano [45']
- Zu fragen (2017), for alto and piano [10']
- Recordare (2018), for mezzo-soprano and piano [6']

== Music with choir ==
- Circle, Chorus and Formal Act (1973), for baritone, 2 female choirs, 9+1 percussionists, oboe (doubling cor anglais), and 2 horns [23']
- Cipriano (1974), for tenor and choir of 9 voices (high soprano, 2 sopranos, mezzo-soprano, counter-tenor, tenor, baritone, and 2 basses)
- Mystery 6, "The Annunciation" (1978–79), soprano, tenor, bass, female choir (6 sopranos, 6 altos), speaker, 7 trumpets, 3 trombones, 3 percussionists, 2 celestas, 4 violins, 4 violas, and cello [20']
- Mystery 8 (unknown date), for choir, 3 flutes, 3 horns, 7 trumpets, 3 trombones, percussion, and strings [25']
- Australian Sea Shanties, Set 1 (1983), for SAB choir [9']
- Ngano (1983–84), for mezzo-soprano, tenor, double SATB choir, flute, and 2 percussionists [18']
- Haiyim (1984), for SATB choir (of at least 12 voices) and 2 cellos [15']
- Maldon (1990), for baritone, SATB choir, 2 trombones, 2 percussionists, and organ [20']
- Seven Sacred Motets (1991), for SATB choir [35'] (also for soli)
- Anima Christi (1991), for countertenor or contralto, tenor, SATB choir, and organ [20']
- "Western Wind" Kyrie (1991), for SATB choir [3'] (also for soli)
- The Cry of the Prophet Zephaniah (1992), for solo baritone, TB choir, 2 trumpets, 2 trombones, and 2 cellos [7']
- Vertue (1993), for unison soprano or children's choir, and piano [9']
- Golden Sleep (1996), for solo tenor, baritone, and SATB choir [12']
- Palm Sunday (1999–2003), for SATB choir, guitar, vibraphone, double bass, and piano [10']
- This Church (2001), "for mezzo-soprano and baritone soloists, 2 narrators, choir, organ, handbells [handbell choir] and ensemble" [66']
- Descriptive Jottings of London (2003), for 3 voices (or choir), accordion, and piano [5']
- Voluala (2004), for SATB choir and organ [4']
- Forget-me-not (published 2005), for SATB choir and ensemble (guitar, suspended cymbal, double bass, and piano) [6']
- Favourite Poets (published 2006), for SATB choir, organ, and ensemble (2 horns, timpani, harp, violin, 2 violas, 2 cellos, and double bass) [20']
- Comfortable Words (2006), for SATB choir and organ [5']
- Magnificat and Nunc Dimittis (2006), for SSATB choir [10']
- Second Magnificat and Nunc Dimittis (2007), for SATB choir and organ [9']
- Mankind (2007–08), "for two principal male voices (speaker and baritone), 3 smaller male speaking rôles, small chorus of female voices, and ensemble" (flute, clarinet, organ, piano, violin, and cello) [70']
- Gedächtnis-Hymne (premièred 2010), for SATB choir and saxophone quartet [20']
- Telling (recorded 2011), for treble soloist and SATB choir [4']
- Oure Father (published 2013), for SATB choir [5']
- 'Y cuán ciegos' (2015/16), for vocal soloist and SATB choir [8']
- John the Baptist (published 2016), for SATB choir and organ [3']
- Dum transisset Sabbatum (2016-18), for mixed choir [13']
- Videte Miraculum (2016-18), for mixed choir [12']
- Easy Things To Do (2018), for choir and piano 4-hands [11']

== Vocal music accompanied by ensemble of 8+ instrumentalists ==
- Jeanne d'Arc (1967), for high soprano, tenor, and solo cello, with flute (doubling piccolo), alto flute, alto recorder, horn, soprano saxophone, bass saxophone, guitar, harp, 3 violins, viola, cello, and double bass [18']
- Folk Song Set (in memory of Percy Grainger) (1969–76), version i, for soprano, cor anglais, clarinet (doubling E♭ clarinet), flugelhorn, percussion, 2 violins, viola, cello, and double bass [15']
- Mr Punch (1976–79), for speaker, flute, oboe or clarinet, percussion, piano, and violin or cello [21']
- Mystery 2, "The Earthly Paradise" (1977–78), for mezzo-soprano, tenor, bass, 2 actors, 2 piccolos, alto recorder, oboe (doubling oboe d'amore), cor anglais, 4 trumpets, 2 celestas, 3 percussionists, 2 violas, 2 cellos, double bass [14']
- Mystery 5, "The Parliament of Heaven" (1977–78), for 3 sopranos, mezzo-soprano, tenor, 3 choirs, children's choir, alto recorder, oboe, 4 trumpets, 3 percussionists, harp, viola, and 2 actors [30']
- Mystery 7, "The Betrayal and Crucifixion of Jesus of Nazareth" (1978–79), for 2 sopranos, mezzo-soprano, tenor, 6 speakers, 2 soprano recorders, 2 piccolos (the second doubling alto flute), oboe d'amore, cor anglais, trumpet, 3 percussionists, 2 celestas, harp, 6 violins, cello
- Vaudeville (1983/87), for mezzo-soprano, baritone, 2 dancers, clarinet, bassoon, flugelhorn, trombone, percussion, violin, and double bass [38']
- Celi (1984/97), for 2 high sopranos, 3 flutes, 3 violas, and 2 harps [15']
- The Undivine Comedy, an opera in 17 scenes (1985–88/89), for soprano, mezzo-soprano, tenor, 2 baritones, 2 flutes (one doubling on piccolo, the other on alto flute), 2 oboes (one doubling on cor anglais), clarinet (doubling on E♭ clarinet and bass clarinet), 2 percussionists, electric organ (doubling on celesta), violin, viola, and cello [114']
- The Transgressive Gospel (2008–09), for 2 singers, violin, viola, cello, accordion, cimbalom, and piano [120']

== Music with tape and/or electronics ==
- Nowhere else to go (1989), for clarinet, trumpet, percussion, cello, synthesizer, tape (or synthesizer), and electronics [15']
- Same as We (1990), version i, for soprano and tape [10']
- Recent Britain (1997–98), for piano obbligato, and 1–3 of the following: clarinet (or flute, oboe, or violin); bassoon (or cello or trombone); cello (or bassoon or trombone); with tapes by each performer [25'] (see also "Open instrumentation")
- Confusion in the service of discovery (2000), for mandolin and 2 pre-recorded mandolins [8']
- Marilyn, Brian, Mike and the cats (2004), for clarinet, piano, and pre-recorded cats [6']
- Third String Quartet (2007–09), "for string quartet and pre-recorded birdsong" [40']

== Open instrumentation ==
- n (1969–72), for 1-4 players playing instruments of different ranges [8']
- Runnin' Wild (1978), for solo oboe, saxophone, clarinet, or bass clarinet [8']
- Moon's goin' down (1980), for "any solo wind instrument or voice" [4']
- Piano Concerto No. 7 (1981), for solo piano, and 1–5 members of a wind quintet (flute, oboe, clarinet, bassoon, horn) [11']
- WAM (1990–91), for piano, a treble instrument, and a bass instrument (e.g. flute, bass clarinet, and piano) [15']
- Plain Harmony (1993), version i, for any combination of multiple instruments [10']
- Recent Britain (1997–98), for piano obbligato, and 1–3 of the following: clarinet (or flute, oboe, or violin); bassoon (or cello or trombone); cello (or bassoon or trombone); with tapes by each performer [25'] (see also "Music with tape and/or electronics")
- False notions of progress (1997), for any 3 instruments
- Marcel Duchamp, the Picabias and Apollinaire Attend a Performance of 'Impressions d'Afrique' by Raymond Roussel at the Théâtre Antoine (1999–2000), for speaking pianist and ensemble (flute, trombone, percussion, cello, and 2nd piano, all with possible substitutions)
- Ettelijke bange eenden (2001), for 3 keyboards, and 1 or 2 duos of instruments (the 1st duo 'legato' instruments, the 2nd 'staccato,' or otherwise contrasting, instruments), all not mutually in tune
- Hoe weinig begrijpen wij (2001), for free ensemble
- Notre Dame Polyphony (2001–02), for free ensemble of 6 or 9 players [8']
- Amphithéâtre des Sciences Mortes (2001–02), for soloist and free ensemble [7']
- Éros uranien (2002), for free ensemble
- Sorrow and its beauty (2002), version i, for free ensemble
- Ceci n'est pas une forme (2003), for soloist and piano quartet (violin, viola, cello, and piano) [6']
- Seterjentens fridag (2003), for hardanger fiddle (or violin) with optional accompaniment (reed organ and/or piano, live and/or recorded, and/or instrumental quartet) [7']
- Von Gloeden Postcards (2003), for piano and optional accompaniment by unspecified instruments (also for solo piano)
- Post-Christian Survival Kit (2003–05), for free ensemble (including 1+ keyboards, 1+ voices, and 1+ percussion)
- Molly-House (2004), for free ensemble (including soloists, keyboards, and electric household devices)
- Vigany's Cabinet (2004–05), for 2–6 trios of instruments [10–20']
- Back on Earth (2005), for free ensemble [6']
- Visualise Love (2006), for SATB voices and optional piano 4-hands
- Not sure (2006), for SSATB voices [3']
- Déjà fait (2006), for free ensemble
- Après-Midi Dada (2006), for 2 keyboards, 2–5 wind instruments, 2–8 plucked instruments, 2–8 percussionists, coffee grinder, and (optionally nude) actors [15']
- Not envious of rabbits (2006), for free ensemble [5']
- Martha Gunn (2007), for "3 high-register wind instruments, water gongs and (silent) actors in and out of bathing-costumes"
- Yso (2007), "for various instrumental configurations"
- D.O.S. (2008), for 2 instruments and keyboard [3']
- Viitasaari (2009), for kantele, piano, and 2 treble instruments [4']
- Late Hey with three Bees (2014), for 2 treble instruments and buzzing instruments [1']
- Maat Strikt (2016), for soloist and ensemble [16']
