= Roderick Chadwick =

English classical pianist

Roderick Chadwick (born 1978) is an English classical pianist.

== Biography and career ==
Chadwick was born in Manchester, England, and studied music at Chetham's School of Music including piano with Heather Slade-Lipkin, Chadwick also studied music at St Catharine's College, Cambridge, and the Royal Academy of Music, where he studied piano with Hamish Milne. He also studied with Peter Pettinger. He received the Mosco Carner Fellowship in 1997–1998, and joined the staff of the Royal Academy of Music in 1999.

Chadwick has performed in many European countries, as well as in the United States and Asia. He has performed at Seoul Arts Centre, Auditorium du Louvre, Schloss Elmau and Tokyo Opera City Concert Hall, Wigmore Hall and others. In addition to solo performances, he is the founder of Plus-Minus Ensemble, and has performed with this group in a number of venues and festivals. He also performs regularly with the CHROMA chamber ensemble.

Chadwick is especially interested in the music of Messiaen and his students, and has carried out musicological research into Messiaen's music. In performance, Chadwick focuses on contemporary and 20th-century music, and works with a number of contemporary composers, including Newton Armstrong, Gloria Coates, Michael Finnissy, Nicola Campogrande, Matthew Shlomowitz, Mihailo Trandafilovski, Bryn Harrison, Trond Reinholdtsen and Michel van der Aa.

Roderick Chadwick has recorded numerous CDs for the Naxos, Innova, Metier and Guild labels, recording works by Gloria Coates, David Gorton, Nicola Campogrande and others.

Chadwick teaches at the Royal Academy of Music, in London.
