= Anna Höstman =

Canadian composer (born 1972)

Anna Höstman (born 1972 in Port Hardy, British Columbia) is a Canadian composer. She currently lives in Victoria, British Columbia.

Höstman studied with John Celona, Christopher Butterfield, Gordon Mumma at the University of Victoria and Gary Kulesha at the University of Toronto.

From 2005-2008 she was Composer-in-Residence with the Victoria Symphony. and she has since written 6 pieces for the orchestra, including a flute concerto for Mark McGregor.

Höstman has written music for film, including the music for From Harling Point, a National Film Board of Canada documentary about a Chinese cemetery in BC, directed by Ling Chiu.

Höstman's opera, What time is it now? was based on an original libretto by P.K. Page, performed by the Victoria Symphony and recorded by CBC Radio. It is a chamber opera for three singers and six players about a woman with dementia.

Höstman's large-scale work, Nuyamł-ił Kulhulmx (Singing the Earth): 11 Pieces about a Place, makes use of historical and contemporary sources in four languages (Nuxalk, Norwegian, English and Japanese) in the creation of an artistic response to the isolated landscape and culture of Bella Coola. The piece was made in collaboration with Dylan Robinson, Marion Newman, Patrick Nickelson and was performed by Continuum Ensemble. It was performed again in 2019 by the Victoria Symphony.

Höstman has also collaborated with the Quatuor Bozzini, and her piece Slanted Birds appears on their CD, À chacun sa miniature.

Höstman also interviews Canadian composers for TEMPO, and has so far interviewed Linda Catlin Smith and Christopher Butterfield.

== Recognition ==
In 2013, Höstman won the Toronto Emerging Composers' Award.

In 2021, Höstman was nominated for a Juno Award for Classical Composition of the year for Harbour.

== List of selected works ==
=== Opera ===
- What time is it now? for 3 vocal soloists, 6 players (2006)

=== Orchestra ===
- Drømde mik en drøm i nat (2013)
- Emily’s Piece (2011)
- Snow Variations (2009)
- Trace the Gold Sun, flute concerto (2008)

=== Chamber music ===
- tributary, for violin, bass clarinet and piano (2018)
- Float (2017)
- Fog (2015)
- Lehtiä (2014)

=== Instrumental solo ===
- Vines and Shadows, harpsichord (2016)
- Water Walking, violin (2016) written for Mira Benjamin
- Harbour, piano (2016)

=== Writing ===
- Höstman, A. (2017). 'My garden is not pristine': an interview with Linda Catlin Smith. Tempo, 71(280), 8-20. doi:10.1017/S0040298217000055
- Höstman, A. (2017). My world as I remember it: an interview with Christopher Butterfield. Tempo, 71(282), 6-17. doi:10.1017/S0040298217000572
- Höstman, A. (2016). Tuber, rhizome, tendril and corm: on the music of Martin Arnold. Tempo, 70(277), 16–33. doi:10.1017/S0040298216000164

=== Piano ===
- Goose On the Loose (CNCM Northern Lights 5B)
- Little Spy Moose (CNCM Northern Lights 5B)
