= Larry Crane =

Larry or Laurence Crane may refer to:

- Larry Crane (recording engineer), American editor, recording engineer and archivist
- Larry Crane (guitarist) (born 1956), American rock musician and songwriter
- Laurence Crane (born 1961), English composer of contemporary classical music
