= John Lely =

British composer

John Lely (born Norwich, England, in 1976) is a British experimental composer, improvising musician and curator based in London, UK.

His music has been commissioned and performed by musicians including Apartment House, Quatour Bozzini, the violinist Mira Benjamin, the harpist Rhodri Davies and the pianist John Tilbury, and has been broadcast on BBC Four, BBC Radio 3 and Resonance FM.

He is co-curator, with the composer Tim Parkinson, of the concert series Music We'd Like to Hear, which has run since 2005 and co-author with fellow composer James Saunders of the book Word Events: Perspectives on Verbal Notation, a study of text scores, which was published by Continuum/Bloomsbury in 2012.

== Education ==
Lely studied at Goldsmiths, University of London, with Roger Redgate, Dave Smith and John Tilbury, and privately with Michael Parsons. In 2007, he was a resident student at Ostrava Days and from 2008 to 2010 he was a researcher at Bath Spa University. From 2003 to 2008, he taught composition and creative strategies at Goldsmiths, and experimental sound at Chelsea College of Arts. He currently teaches at Trinity Laban Conservatoire of Music and Dance.

== Style ==
Lely's music is influenced by an older generation of British experimental composers, such as John White and Michael Parsons, with both of whom he is friends. Lely's music uses both acoustic and electronic objects and instruments, and is concerned with simplicity and use of systems and processes. He has also regularly performed in improvising groups in London, notably with the drummer Eddie Prévost, the violinist Angharad Davies, Sebastian Lexer and others.

Notable works by Lely include The Harmonics of Real Strings (2006), in which a very slow glissando is performed on one string of a bowed instrument, using light finger pressure to activate natural harmonics. The piece was recorded by the cellist Anton Lukoszevieze for the record label Another Timbre, in four separate realisations (one for each of the cello's strings).

All About The Piano (2006) is an open-form piece, in which the pianist plays fragments from the score in an order of their choosing. Simultaneously, the music is recorded and played back, so the music becomes increasingly dense.

Other works and improvisations by Lely have been released on the record labels Matchless Recordings and Another Timbre, while his electronic album, Launch of the Red Bird (2005), was self-released on Bandcamp.

== Selected works ==
- E (2003) for piano, cello, harp, electric guitar and xylophone. Commissioned by MaerzMusik, Berliner Festspiele for Apartment House.
- Cycling in [county/region of performance] (2004) for harp. Commissioned by and dedicated to Rhodri Davies.
- Launch of the Red Bird (2005) electronic album.
- All About the Piano (2006) for pianist with one or more roaming assistants. Commissioned by the Huddersfield Contemporary Music Festival for Philip Thomas and James Saunders.
- The Harmonics of Real Strings (2006) for solo bowed string instrument.
- During (2013) for three cellos. Commissioned by Tre Voci and nu:nord, with support from the Britten-Pears Foundation.
- Assembly (2014) for piano and string quartet. Commissioned by PRS for Music and performed at Spitalfields Music.
- First Page for Five (2014) for any five sustaining pitched instruments. Composed for the Goldsmiths CD on Another Timbre.
- Part Music for Violin (2015) for violin and mono audio. Commissioned by Mira Benjamin with support from the Britten-Pears Foundation.
- Line (2016) for any pitched instrument. Composed for John Tilbury, and recorded for the CD Seaside (Another Timbre 2016).
