= Orazbayev =

Orazbayev (masculine; Kazakh: Оразбаев) or Orazbayeva (feminine; Russian: Оразбаева) is a surname. It comes from the Kazakh name Orazbay and includes the Russian -yev surname suffix. People with the surname include:

- Nurlan Orazbayev (born 1968), Kazakh ice hockey player
- Aisha Orazbayeva (born 1985), Kazakh violinist and writer
