= Plus-minus ensemble =

Music group

Plus Minus is a music group that formed in 2003 specializing in contemporary classical music.

Plus Minus's programming features a mixture of avant-garde and experimental traditions, focusing particularly on open-instrumentation pieces such as Stockhausen's Plus Minus, Andriessen's Workers Union and Cardew's Treatise. They have done profile concerts of Peter Ablinger, Michael Finnissy, Christopher Fox, Bryn Harrison and Phill Niblock, and have premiered works by Laurence Crane, David Helbich, Damien Ricketson, Oyvind Torvund, Erik Ulman, James Saunders, and Stefan Van Eyken.

== Members ==
There are eight members in the ensemble:

- Mark Knoop – conductor/piano/accordion
- Vicky Wright – clarinet(s)
- Roderick Chadwick – piano
- Tom Pauwels – (electric) guitar
- Marcus Barcham-Stevens – violin
- Alex Waterman – cello
- Joanna Bailie & Matthew Shlomowitz – auxiliary instruments.
