= Eve Egoyan =

Canadian pianist and artist

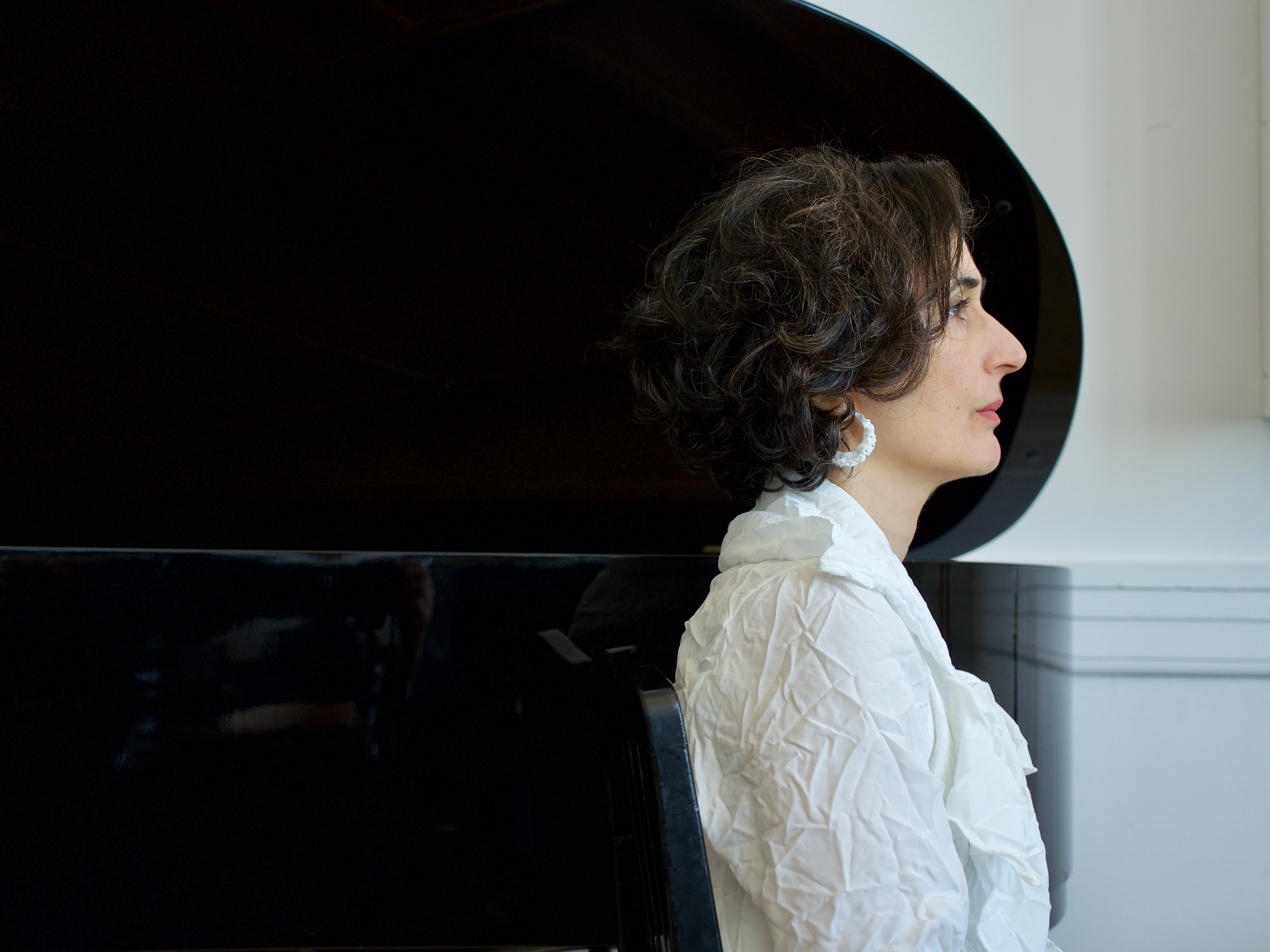
- Eve Egoyan in her studio
- Born: Victoria, British Columbia, Canada
- Education: University of Toronto; University of Victoria
- Occupations: Pianist, artist
- Spouse: David Rokeby
- Children: 1
- Parents: Joseph Egoyan (father); Shushan Egoyan (mother)
- Relatives: Atom Egoyan (brother)
- Website: eveegoyan.com

Eve Egoyan (born 1964) is an Armenian-Canadian pianist and artist based in Toronto.

== Early life and education ==
Egoyan was born in Victoria, British Columbia. Her Armenian parents, Shushan and Joseph, both painters, ran an art gallery/furniture store in Cairo, Egypt, before emigrating to Canada in 1962. Shushan and Joseph settled in Victoria, where they took over a home furnishings/design store.

Egoyan's parents didn't own a piano, but as a young girl she began to see the piano as a “safe, private place”. Egoyan took lessons from an elderly neighbour, and then began formal lessons at 11 at the Victoria Conservatory of Music. She holds a bachelor of music (BMus) from the University of Victoria (1985). She studied piano in Banff with György Sebők, in Berlin with Georg Sava, in London with Hamish Milne, and at the University of Toronto with Patricia Parr, where she completed a master's degree in 1992.

== Music career ==
Egoyan specializes in new works for the piano. Canadian composer Ann Southam dedicated several works to Egoyan throughout the late 1990s and early 2000s including: Qualities of Consonance (1998), Figures: Music for Piano and String Orchestra (2001), In Retrospect (2004), and Simple Lines of Enquiry (2008).

Her 12 solo CDs explore music by composers ranging from Erik Satie to Alvin Curran, Michael Finnissy, James Tenney, Martin Arnold, Linda Catlin Smith, and Southam. Her most recent album, De Puro Amor & En Amor Duro, features two large-scale works by Spanish-German composer Maria de Alvear.

In Surface Tension, a collaborative work with media artist David Rokeby, Egoyan's performance undergoes transformation through Rokeby's software, resulting in images projected onto a screen positioned above the piano. Variations in dynamics, pitch, tone, and duration serve as triggers for visuals inspired by natural phenomena, such as the movements of planets, the swarming of insects, and the ripple effects caused by a falling pebble.

In 2018, Egoyan created Solo for Duet, an integrated mix of sound, image, and unspoken narrative challenging traditional conceptions of piano and pianist. The following year she collaborated with director Su Rynard on a 72-minute portrait film, Duet for Solo Piano, that documents this musical exploration.

Egoyan's current focus is composing and performing her own work for augmented piano – an acoustic piano equipped with computer software to extend, expand, and enhance the sound.

Egoyan has been the recipient of several accolades including "Best Classical" by The Globe and Mail (1999) for her first solo CD; one of "Ten Top" classical discs, by The New Yorker magazine (2009); and "Top Classical Disc of the Year", by The Globe and Mail (2011). In 2013, she received a Chalmers Arts Fellowship. In 2019, the CBC named her one of the “best 25 Canadian classical pianists of all time”. She won the Muriel Sherrin Award from the Toronto Arts Foundation in 2019.

She has performed in Canada, the US, Europe, and Japan, including festivals in Italy (Transart), Austria (Klangspuren), the UK (Huddersfield Festival), and Vancouver (Modulus Festival). She is a Fellow of the Royal Society of Canada (FRSC) and has been designated a CMC Ambassador by the Canadian Music Centre. Egoyan is an elected Associate of the Royal Academy of Music, London, England (ARAM).

== Personal life ==
Egoyan is married to David Rokeby, a media artist. Her older brother, Atom Egoyan, is an Armenian-Canadian filmmaker.

== Discography ==
Selected solo recordings:

- (2016) Maria de Alvear's diptych De Puro Amor and En Amor Duro
- (2015) "Thought and Desire" (Earwitness Editions and World Edition)
- (2013), 5 (Centrediscs)
- (2011), RETURNINGS, (Centrediscs)
- (2009), Simple Lines of Enquiry (Centrediscs)
- (2007), Asking (Mode Records, New York)
- (2006), Weave (Earwitness Records)
- (2005), WU by Rudolf Komorous (Candereen Records)
- (2004), The Art of Touching the Keyboard (Earwitness Records)
- (2001), Recoins (Hidden Corners) (CBC Records)
- (1999), thethingsinbetween (Artifact Music)
