= Claudia Molitor =

English-German composer

Claudia Molitor (born 1974) is an English-German composer based in Brighton, East Sussex, England.

== Biography ==
Born in Germany, Claudia Molitor studied Music and Media at University of Sussex. After an MA in Music at City University London, she completed her PhD in Composition at the University of Southampton in 2004 (her supervisor was Michael Finnissy). She currently lectures in music at City University London.

== Work ==
Molitor can best be described as a conceptual composer. However, she has composed works for more traditional ensembles, such as Apartment House, and for orchestra (awarded a Royal Philharmonic Society Music Award). A fair number of her more recent 'works' are collaborations with composer-performers, such as Lemon Drizzle (a duo she formed with Sarah Nicholls) and site-specific works including Singing Bridge for a walk over Waterloo Bridge from Somerset House to the National Theatre in London, and Sonorama for the train journey between London's St Pancras railway station and Margate.

Molitor is inspired by a wide range of music and composers including Pauline Oliveros, to whom her piece Auricularis Superior (commissioned by Huddersfield Contemporary Music Festival) is dedicated, exploring her idea of Deep Listening.

== Scholarships and awards ==
- Alert (2008), Royal Philharmonic Society

== Works (small selection) ==
- 'Paper cut ? a homage to Cage (and Beethoven of course)'
- 'Who kissed my head?', for live electronics and acoustic instruments
- 'Oh Du Kleines Kabinett', 2006
- 'Alert', 2008
- 'Untitled [fizzy painting makes me happy]', 2007
