= Marc Sabat =

Canadian composer (born 1965)

- Born: 22 September 1965 (age 60); Kitchener, Ontario, Canada
- Years active: 1970s–present
- Website: Plainsound Music Edition

Marc Sabat (born 22 September 1965) is a Canadian composer based in Berlin, Germany, since 1999.

== Works ==
He has made concert music pieces, works with video, and installations. Sabat's music combines acoustic instruments and occasionally computer-generated electronics, drawing inspiration from ongoing research about the sounding and perception of microtonal rational intonation (JI). He relates his practice to various music forms, seeking points of shared exploration and dialogue between different modes of experience and cultural traditions. His work is presented internationally in radio broadcasts and at festivals of new music including the Bludenzer Tage zeitgemäßer Musik, Donaueschinger Musiktage, MaerzMusik Berlin, Darmstadt and Carnegie Hall. His works do not fall into a single personal style, but they generally share a crystalline clarity of texture and a seek to focus listeners' perception of sounding structures into a process of musical 'thinking'. Sabat is a frequent collaborator, having worked often with visual artists and other composers, including brother painter and filmmaker Peter Sabat. Other collaborators include John Oswald (composer), Martin Arnold, Nicolas Fernandez, Matteo Fargion, Wolfgang von Schweinitz, and artists Lorenzo Pompa and Mareike Lee. Sabat's music may be heard on the Plainsound Music Edition YouTube Channel.

== Research ==
Since the early 1990s, Sabat has been reinvestigating harmony by studying the theory and musical applications of rational intonation. Together with Wolfgang von Schweinitz he conceived and developed a method of staff notation for JI ratios called The Extended Helmholtz-Ellis JI Pitch Notation. He has also studied JI intervals empirically on string and brass instruments, developing a list of so-called "tuneable intervals": ratios within a three-octave span which can readily be tuned by ear using electronic or acoustic sounds. These intervals appear frequently in Sabat's compositions and also are the basis of a self-tuning computer algorithm ("Micromaelodeon") which is currently under development. The HEJI notation was updated and slightly revised in 2020, in collaboration with Thomas Nicholson with contributions from Wolfgang von Schweinitz, Catherine Lamb and M.O. Abbott. Most recently, Sabat has developed the harmonic radius measure for evaluating relative harmonicity of arbitrary pitch sets.

== Recent projects ==
Recent projects include works for orchestra, chamber orchestra, and various ensembles. Sabat is a pioneer of instrumental music written and performed in JI and one of few composers composing for larger forces with these sounds.

== Studies, teaching, residencies ==
Largely self-taught as a composer, Sabat studied violin at the University of Toronto, at the Juilliard School in New York, as well as working privately with improviser Malcolm Goldstein and composers James Tenney and Walter Zimmermann, among others. He attended courses in electronic and computer music at McGill University. In 2008-9 he took part in a postgraduate pilot project initiated by the Berlin University of the Arts, the Graduiertenschule für die Künste und die Wissenschaften.

He teaches courses in composition, acoustics and experimental intonation at the Universität der Künste Berlin, and has been a guest artist at the California Institute of the Arts, at the Liszt Academy Budapest, the Escola Superior in Barcelona, the Janáček Music Academy in Brno and the Paris Conservatoire. He has been a regular lector at the Ostrava Days Festival and Institute since 2017.

In fall 2010, he was artist-in-residence of the Villa Aurora in Los Angeles, followed in 2011 by a one-year Stipendium at the German Academy in Rome, Villa Massimo. Previous residencies include Akademie Schloss Solitude (1997–98, music juror: Christian Wolff), Herrenhaus Edenkoben (1996, music juror: Peter Eötvös).

Sabat is currently a doctoral researcher at the Sibelius Academy, Uniarts Helsinki.

== Career as violinist ==
Beginning in the 1980s, Sabat has also been active as a performer on violin and adapted viola, concentrating primarily on American Experimental Music of the 20th Century, including his own work. He has recorded CDs of music by James Tenney, Morton Feldman, Christian Wolff, and Maria de Alvear, amongst others. In the 1990s, whilst living in Toronto, he formed a duo with pianist Stephen Clarke, as well as performing with the Modern Quartet and the Arraymusic Ensemble. In recent years Sabat for the most part has concentrated on creating and playing his own music. Together with colleagues Catherine Lamb, Rebecca Lane, and Thomas Nicholson, he is a founding member of the Berlin-based JI collective Harmonic Space Orchestra.

== List of works ==
- Marc Sabat Worklist
