= Angharad Davies =

Welsh violinist, composer and musician

Angharad Davies is a Welsh violinist and composer, known for her work in the field of free improvisation, her use of prepared violin (using techniques similar to the prepared piano), her extensive discography and collaborative work with other musicians.

== Early life and education ==
Davies was born in Aberystwyth, Wales, and grew up in a musical household, playing in local brass bands alongside her father and brother. Her father was an amateur trumpet player and her brother is Rhodri Davies, now known as an improvising harpist. She studied at the Royal Northern College of Music and subsequently with violinists Charles-Andre Linale in Düsseldorf, Germany and Howard Davis in London.

== Career ==
Davies has collaborated on improvised projects with musicians and artists including Tarek Atoui, Tony Conrad, Laura Cannell, Jack McNamara, Roberta Jean and J.G.Thirlwell.

Davies is also active in the field of contemporary composition and is a frequent member of the ensemble Apartment House. Davies' composed works include Solo Violin and Four Bass Amps, in which the violin is deconstructed during the performance of the piece, and the orchestral work I ble’r aeth y gwrachod I gyd…?, which was commissioned by the 2019 London Contemporary Music Festival. She has been commissioned by Explore Ensemble, and GBSR Duo.

Davies has also collaborated with French composer Éliane Radigue, who wrote the solo violin work OCCAM XXI for her in 2015.

She played violin in the score for the 2025 film The Testament of Ann Lee.

== Discography ==
Davies is credited with performances on over 50 album recordings, appearing alongside an extensive list of improvising musicians including Tom Chant, Benedict Drew, John Edwards, Axel Dörner, Johnny Chang, John Tilbury, Lina Lapelyte, John Lely, Rie Nakajima and Toshimaru Nakamura. As of 2020, Davies has appeared on twenty one albums on the UK improvised and experimental music label Another Timbre.

She is also credited with appearances on The Magic Numbers eponymous 2005 album and Richard Dawson's 2017 album Peasant. Dawson described Davies' idiosyncratic violin playing on his album as “being like a layer of frost, or maybe dew, or maybe like a light fog, just clinging to everything”.
