= Georgia Rodgers =

- Origin: United Kingdom
- Occupation(s): Composer, acoustician
- Years active: 2010–present

Georgia Rodgers is a composer and acoustician from the United Kingdom, currently based in London.

== Biography ==
In 2009, Rodgers earned her bachelor's of science in physics and music from the University of Edinburgh and in 2010, she completed her Master of Science in digital composition and performance from the same school.

Rodger's work focuses on textural and spatial aspects of sound and the experience of listening, and on the physical and acoustic properties of instruments.

In 2013, she pursued a year-long collaboration with Séverine Ballon after being introduced to the cellist by her PhD supervisor, Newton Armstrong. The collaboration resulted in her work, Late Lines, for cello and electronics, in which the electronic sounds are derived exclusively from simple processing of the cello.

In 2014, she was a Sound and Music Next Wave artist. Two of her works from the same year, Partial filter and Cut it out were performed at Cafe Oto in 2015, by Oren Marshal and Mark Knoop, respectively. Partial filter also appears on the NMC Next Wave release

Then, in 2016, she was selected as one of Sound and Music's New Voices and was an Embedded composer, taking part in the Quatuor Bozzini's Composers' Kitchen. During this scheme she wrote her Three Pieces for String Quartet, which were later performed again by members of Apartment House at the British contemporary music series, Music we'd like to hear.

Rodgers is listed in the British Music Collection. An article written by her on Simon Emmerson's work, "Spirit of ‘76", also appears on the BMC website, as part of their 50 Things series, in which they ask musicians to reflect on works from the collection that have been influential on or of interest to their own work.

Her 2018 work, York Minster, was recorded by the Marsyas Trio for upcoming release on NMC. York Minster is one of a series of works that explore the harmonic frequencies of resonant spaces, what Rodgers refers to as 'Real Spaces'. The other two works in the series so far are Maeshowe (based on the acoustic fingerprint of the Neolithic Tomb in the Orkney Islands) and St Andrew's Lyddington.

In July 2018, she was a recipient of an Oram Award, celebrating female innovators in music and sound, sponsored by PRS. She completed a PhD in music composition at City, University of London, supervised by Newton Armstrong.

== Works ==
- York Minster, for flute, cello and piano (2018)
- Maeshowe, for clarinet, trombone, percussion, harp, piano and cello (2018)
- St Andrew's Lyddington, for violin and piano (2017)
- Near and Far, for vocal ensemble and electronic sounds (2017)
- Distal theories, for trombone and cello (2017)
- Masking set for alto, viola and cello (2016)
- Three pieces for string quartet (2016)
- Tadoussac, electroacoustic (2015)
- Partial filter, for tuba and electronics (2014)
- Tuba study III, electroacoustic (2014)
- Cut it out, for piano and electronics (2014)
- Piano sketch, electroacoustic (2014)
- Late lines, for cello and electronics (2013)
- Late lines remix, electroacoustic (2013)
- Train your body, installation (2011)
- A to B, for percussion and electronics (2010)
- Make it snappy, electroacoustic (2010)
- Edinburgh flow motion, soundwalk (2010)
- Non-real time, electroacoustic (2009)
- Shuffleships, electroacoustic (2009)
- Breath(e), electroacoustic (2008)
