= Matthew Shlomowitz =

Australian composer (born 1975)

Matthew Shlomowitz (born 7 February 1975) is a composer of contemporary classical music and Associate Professor in Composition at the University of Southampton.

== Biography ==
He was raised in Adelaide, Australia, and studied with Božidar Kos at the Sydney Conservatorium of Music and with Brian Ferneyhough at Stanford University. He also studied privately with Michael Finnissy in the United Kingdom.

Since 2002 he has lived in London where he lectured at the Royal College of Music and for the Syracuse University London Program. He taught composition at Durham University during the 2008/09 academic year and was a Programme Collaborator for the Borealis Festival in Norway.

== Music ==
He is co-director of Plus minus ensemble and the performance series Rational Rec and is a member of InterInterInter, a group that creates events mixing performance and audience activity. He was also a co-founder of Ensemble Offspring. He has been represented by the New Voices scheme at the British Music Information Centre and by the Australian Music Centre.

The bulk of his compositions are for chamber ensembles and often involve unusual instrumental combinations. Free Square Jazz, for instance, is for recorder, electric guitar, double bass and drum kit and Line and Length is scored for soprano saxophone, oboe, clarinet, bass clarinet & bassoon.

A number of his works are interdisciplinary such as the music-video pieces Train Travel and Six Aspects of the Body in Image and Sound (co-created with Rees Archibald) and an ongoing series of works for visual performer and musician called Letter Pieces. Certain works fall more comfortably into the genre of "performance pieces" such as Northern Cities and When is a Door Not a Door? Other works blur the boundaries between concert music and performance piece such as Five Monuments of Our Time, an orchestral work that requires the conductor to perform a series of choreographed gestures often ludicrously unrelated to the music being played. Such apparent absurdity and humor is not unintended; it has been said that,

... he seems to have a special feeling for those inadvertently comical situations in which we all sometimes find ourselves: a peculiar kind of miscommunication where we don’t so much get our wires crossed ... as get entangled in them

— musicuratum.com

Some of his music shows the structural constraints analogous to the rules of Oulipo; familiar sounds from popular and everyday culture are also a regular feature of his music palette.

== Musical style ==
He has described his own music as being "something like the bastard love child of Brian Ferneyhough and Philip Glass."

== Musical works ==
Selected musical works, including commissions and major works, are:

Category	Title	Year	Orchestration	Commissioned by
Vocal music	Instrumental Music	2011	8 voices	EXAUDI
Performance pieces	Letter Pieces	2007+	Open-score pieces for performer and musician	-
Orchestra	Music and Actions for strings, keyboard and conductor	2015	Conductor, keyboard and string orchestra	Nederlands Strijkers Gilde
"	Listening Styles	2013	orchestra with drum kit	The Adelaide Festival
7+ players	Popular Contexts, Volume 3: The Music of Theatre Making	2011	Conductor, flute, oboe, bass clarinet, drum-kit (with glockenspiel), guitar, mandolin, violin, viola, cello, double bass and sampler keyboard	Nieuw Ensemble
"	Avant Muzak	2010	Flute, soprano saxophone, drum kit, electric guitar, harp, violin, cello and sampler	Centre Henri Pousseur for Ensemble bESIdES
"	Joy Time Ride for Ives	2009	Flute, oboe, bass clarinet, bassoon, drum-kit, electric organ, 2 violins, cello and double bass	Ives Ensemble
2–6 players	Popular Contexts, Volume 7: Public domain music	2014	Clarinet, electric guitar, synthesizer and sampler, drum-kit and cello	asamisimasa
"	The Major Sevenths Medley	2014	4 electric guitars	TRANSIT Festival for Zwerm
"	Popular Contexts, Volume 6	2013	Trio for vibraphone, drum-kit and sampler keyboard	MaerzMusik, Speak Percussion with support from Julian Burnside
"	Logic Rock	2013	Guitar and drum kit	bESIdES
"	Songs about words and about the pleasure of misery	2012	Soprano and piano	The Britten-Pears Foundation
"	Popular Contexts, Volume 4: Rhythm Section	2012	midi guitar and 3 drum kits	Drumming Grupo da percussao
"	Theme Street Parade	2009	String quartet	BBC for Quatuor Diotima
"	Earth Breeze Smoke	2008	2 recorders	The Bruges Concertgebouw
"	Line and Length	2007	Soprano saxophone, oboe, clarinet, bass clarinet & bassoon	The 2007 Spitalfields Festival for Calefax
"	Slow Flipping Harmony	2006	Four melodic instruments and one auxiliary player	The Australia Council for the Arts for Ensemble Offspring
"	Free Square Jazz	2005	Soprano/tenor recorder, electric guitar, double bass and drum kit	The Orpheus Institute for Champ D'Action
Solos	Popular Contexts, Volume 2	2010	For piano, sampler, voice and physical actions (one person)	Centre Henri Pousseur for Stephane Ginsburgh
"	Serious and Sincere Sentiments About Something (or "Thought Rhythms")	1999	Guitar	The Australia Council for the Arts
Works with video	A Documentary Saga of the OULIPO	2006–7	Video work with Rees Archibald & Andrew Infanti	-
"	Six Aspects of the Body in Image and Sound	2004	Clarinet, piano, violin, viola, cello and video (by Rees Archibald)	The Bath International Festival of Music for The Tate Ensemble

== Operas ==
- Electric Dreams (2017)

== Prizes and awards ==
- 7th Johann-Joseph-Fux Competition for Opera Composition
