= David Rokeby =

Canadian artist (born 1960)

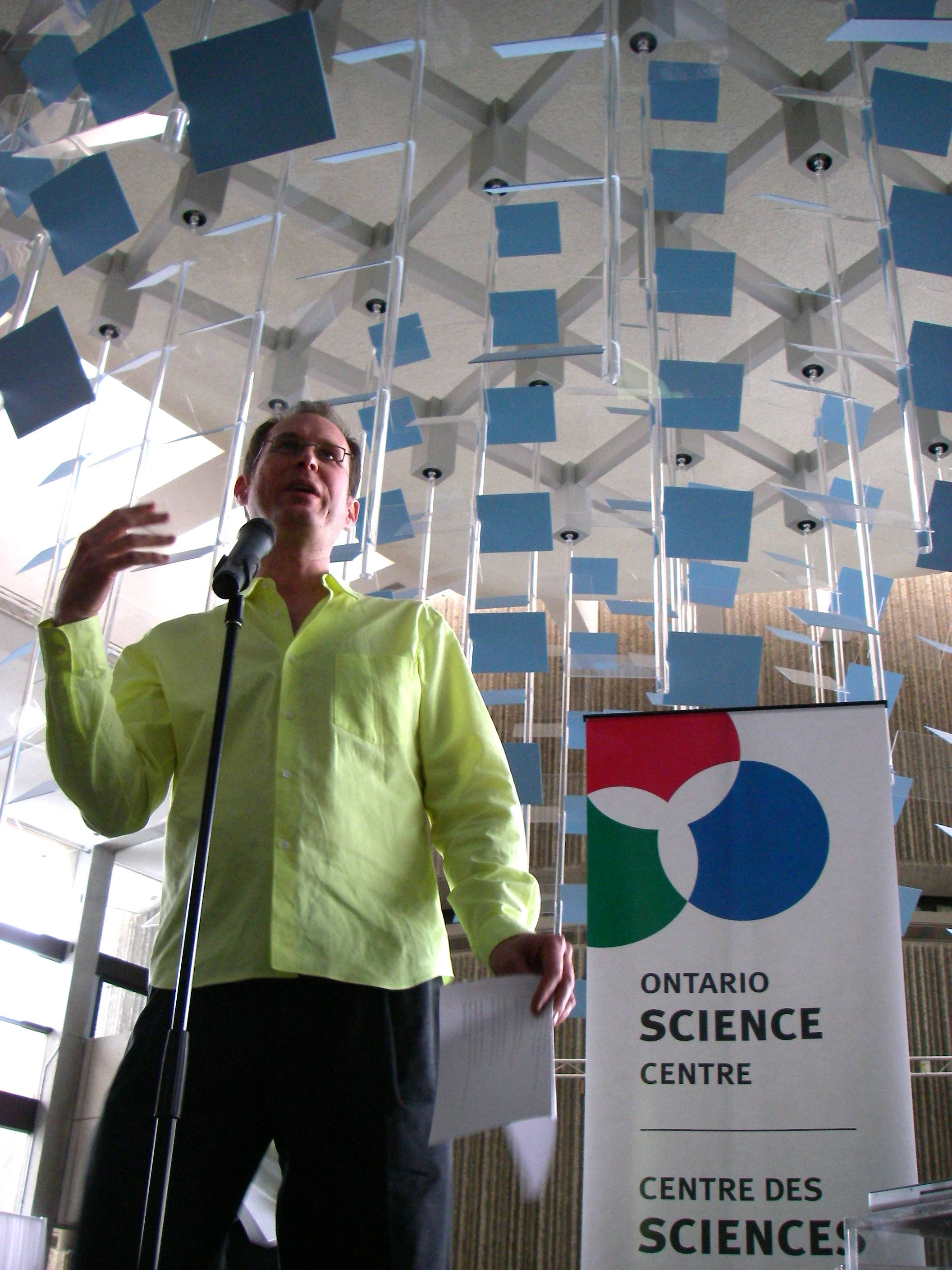
- Rokeby at the unveiling of the work Cloud (2007)
- Born: 1960 (age 65–66); Tillsonburg, Ontario, Canada
- Spouse: Eve Egoyan
- Children: 1
- Parents: Richard Rokeby (father); Jane Rokeby (née Jane Walkington) (mother)

David Rokeby (born 1960) is a Canadian artist who has been making works of electronic, video and installation art since 1982. He lives with his wife, acclaimed pianist Eve Egoyan, in Toronto, Canada.

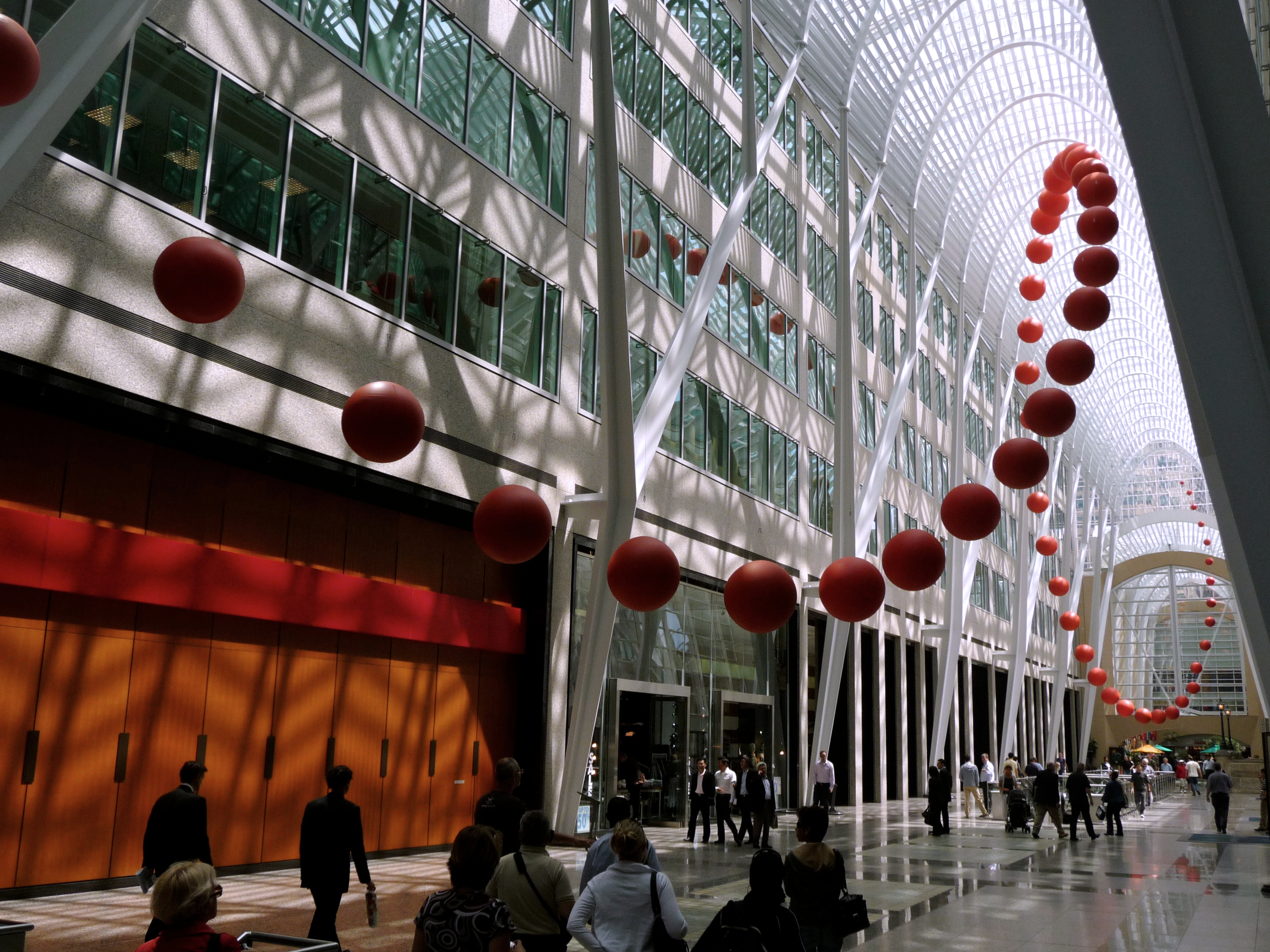
long wave by David Rokeby 2009

His early work Very Nervous System (1982–1991) is acknowledged as a pioneering work of interactive art, translating physical gestures into real-time interactive sound environments. Very Nervous System was presented at the Venice Biennale in 1986.

== Work ==
Rokeby's pioneering interactive work Very Nervous System has been evolving since 1982. In Wired Magazine the work is described as

"A combination of technologies, some off-the-shelf, some rare and esoteric, and some cooked up by Rokeby himself. Initially, in 1982, much more of the system was homemade. His circuitry, designed to speed up the response of the sluggish Apple II, was still not fast enough to analyze an image from an ordinary video camera, so he built his own low-res device: a little box with 64 light sensors behind a plastic Fresnel lens. But Very Nervous System has been evolving for 13 years, during which time the world has seen any number of technological revolutions. So Rokeby now has a lot more store-bought components incorporated into the system: it can handle a Mac Quadra and real video cameras, via sophisticated "Max" software from Paris."

A number of Rokeby's works address issues of digital surveillance, including Watch (1995), Guardian Angel (2002) and Sorting Daemon (2003). In addition to his surveillance art, other works engage in a critical examination of the differences between human and artificial intelligence. The Giver of Names (1991) and n-cha(n)t (2001) are artificial subjective entities, provoked by objects or spoken words in their immediate environment to formulate sentences and speak them aloud.

He has exhibited and lectured extensively in the Americas, Europe and Asia. He is the Director of the BMO Lab for Creative Research in the Arts, Performance, Emerging Technologies and AI at the Centre for Drama, Theatre and Performance Studies at the University of Toronto.

== Major exhibitions ==
- Venice Biennale, Venice, Italy (1986)
- Feuer / Erde / Wasser/ Luft, Mediale, Deichtorhallen, Hamburg, Germany (1993)
- Kwangju Biennale, Kwangju, Korea (1995)
- Alien Intelligence, Kiasma Museum of Contemporary Art, Helsinki, Finland (2000)
- Ars Electronica, Linz, Austria (2002, 1998 and 1991)
- Venice Biennale of Architecture, Venice, Italy (2002)
- Governor General's Award Winners, National Gallery of Canada, Ottawa Canada (2002)
- Einbildung, Das Wahrnehmen in der Kunst, Kunsthaus Graz, Graz Austria (2003)
- Algorithmische Revolution, Zentrum für Künst und Media, Karlesruhe, Germany (2004)
- David Rokeby, Silicon Remembers Carbon retrospective, FACT, Liverpool, and CCA, Glasgow, U.K. (2007)
- Profiling, Whitney Museum of American Art, New York City, U.S.A. (2007)
- e-art, Montreal Museum of Fine Arts, Montreal, Canada (2007)
- Synthetic Time, National Art Museum of China, Beijing, China (2008)
- See This Sound, Lentos Museum, Linz, Austria (2009)
- Panorama 14, Le Fresnoy Studio Nationale des arts contemporains, Tourcoing, France (2012)
- Realidad Elástica, Laboral Centro de Arte y Creación Industrial, Gijòn, Spain (2013)
- Human Intelligence, Centre Culturel Canadien, Paris, France (2020)
- Chengdu Biennale:SUPERFUSION, Chengdu, China (2021)

== Awards ==
Very Nervous System was awarded the first Petro-Canada Award for Media Arts in 1988 and Austria's Prix Ars Electronica Award of Distinction for Interactive Art in 1991. Watched and Measured (2000) was awarded the first BAFTA award for interactive art from the British Academy of Film and Television Arts in 2000. For his installation n-cha(n)t, Rokeby was awarded the Prix Ars Electronica (Golden Nica for Interactive Art) in 2002. In 2002, he was awarded a Governor General's Award in Visual and Media Arts.
