= Aisha Orazbayeva =

Violinist from Kazakhstan (born 1985)

Aisha Orazbayeva Айша Оразбаева
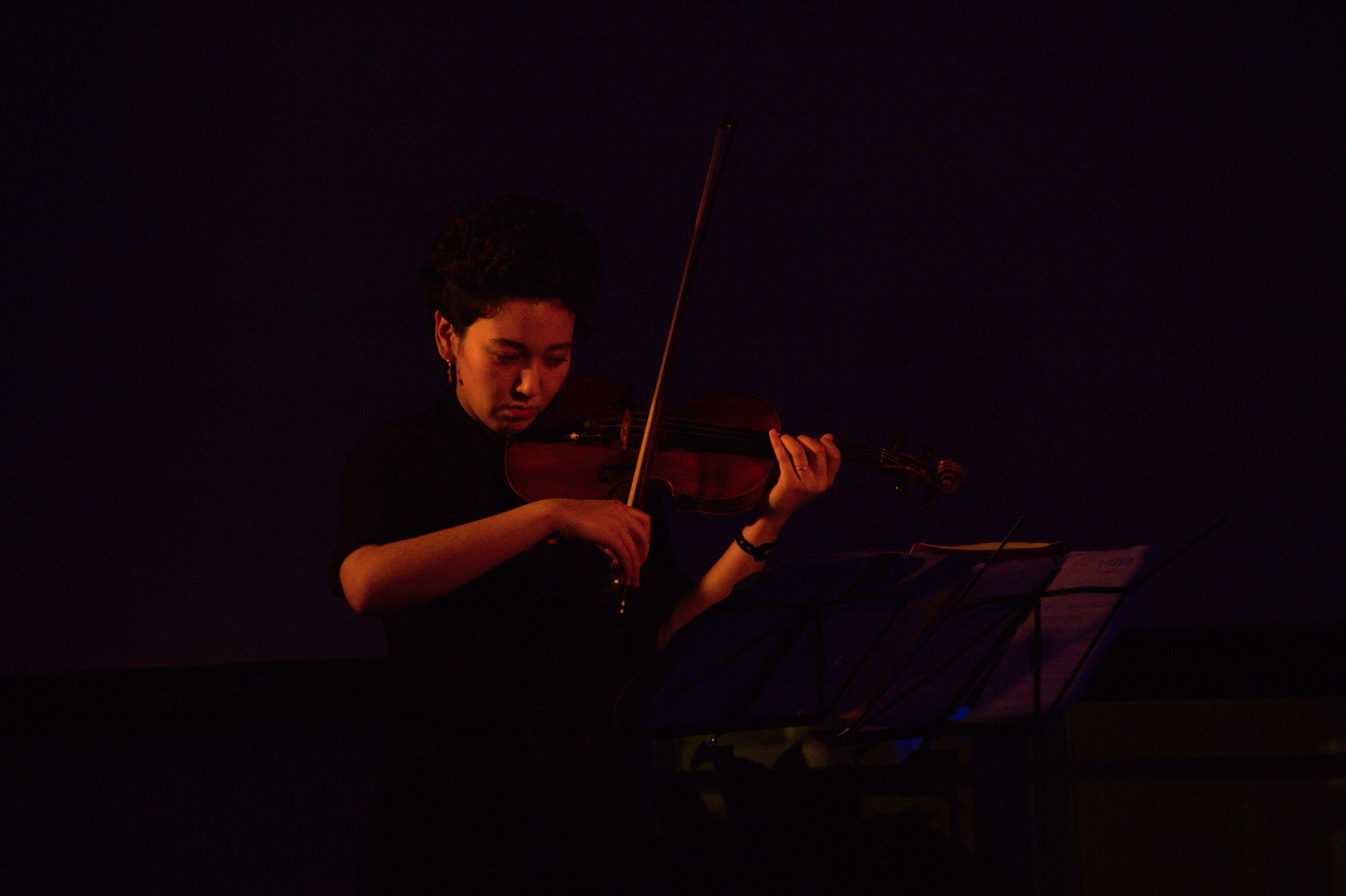
- Orazbayeva performing in 2017

Background information
- Born: 1985 (age 40–41)
- Origin: Kazakhstan
- Genres: Classical music
- Occupation: Violinist
- Website: aishaorazbayeva.com

Aisha Orazbayeva (Kazakh: Айша Оразбаева, romanized: Aişa Orazbaeva; born 1985) is a Kazakh violinist. Outside performing, she also writes and has had plays broadcast on the radio. She gained notice for her performance of Salvatore Sciarrino's Sei Capricci.

Orazbayeva collaborated with computer music composer Peter Zinovieff on a violin concerto Our Too, premiered at London Contemporary Music Festival in 2014.

In 2014, composer Bryn Harrison wrote Receiving the Approaching Memory, a 40-minute work for violin and piano, for Orazbayeva and pianist Mark Knoop. An album version was released in 2015.
