= Mira Benjamin =

Canadian musician

Mira Benjamin (born in Vancouver, British Columbia) is a Canadian violinist and researcher. She currently lives in London.

She was a member of the Quatuor Bozzini from 2011 to 2014.

Benjamin appears regularly with the London-based ensemble Apartment House, directed by Anton Lukoszevieze, and appears on multiple releases by that group on the Another Timbre label, including albums of music by composers such as Martin Arnold, Linda Catlin Smith, Jürg Frey, Chiyoko Szlavniks, Richard Glover, and Isaiah Ceccarelli.

She is co-director of nu:nord, a community-building project-based music and performing art network that connects practitioners in Canada, Norway and the United Kingdom.

She also works with the London Contemporary Orchestra and appears on albums including Radiohead's A Moon Shaped Pool

== Composer collaborations ==
Her collaboration with composer James Weeks resulted in an hour-long piece for solo violin called windfell, described by the composer as having arisen

...from the image of a violin played by the wind, the bow and strings set in motion without human mediation. windfell is a high, remote place, a wind-hill: the setting both for a gradual sounding-out of the instrument and a contemplation of the relationship between instrument and player, between sound, space and time, and between humanity and our environment.

She has also worked with Cassandra Miller, who, making use of Benjamin's 'down-to-earth, no-nonsense gritty focus' wrote for mira, which is an arrangement for violin of a transcription of an acoustic performance of Kurt Cobain singing Where did you sleep last night. Her work with composer Scott McLaughlin began with his string quartet, a metastable harmony (2012), written for the Quatuor Bozzini while Benjamin was a member, and was furthered with The Endless Mobility of Listening for violin and electronics. McLaughlin writes of the work:

This piece is based on the same string technique of drone-bowing on open strings to reveal upper partials, with the listening aspect now shifted to using a footswitch to trigger the electronics to ‘capture’ the current partial. The electronics infinitely sustain the briefly isolated partials in an ever-growing ‘tapestry’ of harmony as the detuning changes the environment.

Anna Höstman wrote Water Walking, for solo violin, for Benjamin. The piece is inspired by the Anishinaabe Migration Water Walk from Matane, Quebec to Madeline Island, Wisconsin.

Luke Nickel wrote his [factory] for Benjamin, the first of his scores that play on the use of the performer memory and risk. Benjamin received written score instructions from the composer, which she was permitted to read only once in learning the work.

== Writing ==
- Benjamin, M. (2017). Horatiu Radulescu - HORATIU RADULESCU : Piano Sonatas & String Quartets 1. Stephen Clarke, JACK Quartet. Mode 290. Tempo, 71(281), 100–101. doi:10.1017/S0040298217000298
- Benjamin, M., Nickel, L. (2017). Correspondance on Tuning. CeReNeM Journal, (6) 49–57.
