= Verdi Transcriptions (Finnissy) =

The 36 Verdi Transcriptions for piano by the British composer Michael Finnissy were composed between 1972 and 2005. They are based on the works of Giuseppe Verdi.

== Background ==
The Transcriptions, in the words of the composer, "are ...not simply about Verdi. They form a critique of a musical culture which is over-saturated in its past...by dissection, analysis, parody, and by self-dramatised intent." In four books of nine pieces each, they include in chronological sequence at least one transcription from each of Verdi's operas, together with one transcription drawn from his string quartet, and conclude with a transcription of the first section of his Requiem.

In creating the Transcriptions Finnissy was influenced by the concepts of Ferruccio Busoni, who believed that musical notation "is itself the transcription of an abstract idea. The moment that the pen takes possession of it, the thought loses its original form". The implication is that all composition is a form of transcription, and in this light Finnissy's often very substantial diversions from the originals may be viewed as re-creations of the original 'abstract ideas' which prompted Verdi himself. The influence of Busoni can be felt throughout the Transcriptions in the form of quotations from or allusions to Busoni's own compositions; the pianist Ian Pace considers the work to be a 'Homage to Busoni'.

In an interview the composer has stated: "I was trying to work out how to write my own music with Verdi's material, not obviously quoting from it. Indeed the series of pieces start off being completely unlike Verdi and only (with number 36) sounding at all like the originals." Concerning his transcription of the aria Me pellegrina ed orfano from La forza del destino (now no. XXVI of the complete sequence), he has written

I... generally increas[ed] the harmonic ambiguity, eliding the original phrases, re-voicing Verdi's (orchestral) texture, creating a kind of production of the scene in my imagination... like a film in which the actor has been entirely subsumed into the soundtrack, and the visible transcended.

== Composition ==
The first two books of the Transcriptions were composed in the period 1972–1988 and revised in 1995. Originally Book 2 consisted of only six transcriptions; in this form the first two books were performed by Ian Pace at Conway Hall, London in 1996 and recorded by him, together with three additional fragments, in 2001.

In the final (2005) version of the Transcriptions, each book is considered as an integral sequence of nine sections. Book I, which retains the same sequence as in the 1995 revision, covers Verdi's operas from Oberto (1839) to Attila, (1846). Book II, which is dedicated to Stephen Pruslin, begins with another Attila transcription and covers the operas to Rigoletto, (1851). The content differs from the 1995 version of Book II, with some of the earlier contents being removed to later books to match the temporal sequence of the operas, and new transcriptions composed to take their place. Book III, dedicated to Marilyn Nonken, ranges from a second Rigoletto transcription to Macbeth, (1865 version). Book IV, dedicated to Jonathan Powell, commences with a further Macbeth transcription and concludes with the Requiem aeternam section of the 1874 Requiem. This is the only transcription out of temporal sequence with that of the original works; it is preceded by transcriptions from Otello (1887) and Falstaff (1893). Unlike the other Transcriptions the final one is " a relatively faithful setting...though never quite totally stable".

== Reception ==
Critical response to the recording by Pace was generally positive. Michael Oliver, in International Record Review (April 2002), wrote that the composer matches "Verdian imagery with pianistic and fundamentally modern ones: a limpid glitter evokes the Venetian lagoon of I due Foscari but tempests follow, and lightning staccato clusters, and sepulchral rumblings like a Kraken stirring beneath the Adriatic. Grace notes in an aria from Giovanna d’Arco prompt poised and ornate lines of Finnissy’s own"; Oliver calls the Don Carlos transcription "both a highly original response to Verdi and a magnificently pianistic sound." Arnold Whitall, in The Gramophone (April 2002) was more cautious: "You could certainly argue that in its boldness, emotional intensity and love of display, Finnissy's music is truer to Verdi than any abject imitator of the Verdi style could ever be. On the other hand, pushing things to extremes was not the Verdian way either." BBC Music Magazine gave the recording a five-star rating.
