= Laurence Crane =

British composer

Laurence Crane (born 1961 in Oxford) is a British composer of contemporary classical music.

== Career ==
Laurence Crane is closely associated with the ensemble Apartment House, who have given over 40 performances of his works. Some performances they have given include Riis (1996) and John White in Berlin (2003).

He has written a considerable amount of piano music. Pianists who have performed his work include Michael Finnissy, Thalia Myers and John Tilbury.

His piece Octet was shortlisted for the 2009 Royal Philharmonic Society Music Awards in the Chamber-Scale Composition category, along with works by Harrison Birtwistle and Karlheinz Stockhausen. In 2017, he won the Paul Hamlyn Foundation Awards for Artists 2017. In the same year, his piece Omloop Het Ives for bass flute and string quartet was nominated for the British Composer Awards.

In 2021, Juliet Fraser, in association with Oxford Lieder Festival and Musica Sacra Maastricht, commissioned Crane to write a new piece that responds to the work of marine biologist Rachel Carson. The commission, Natural World for soprano and piano/sampler keyboard, won the Small Chamber Ivor Novello Award in 2022. Commenting on the piece, the jury added that "the composer has carefully chosen every note resulting in a beautifully placed and slowly evolving piece that is contemplative without losing momentum".

In 2021, to mark Crane's 60th birthday, a series of anniversary events was held at various venues across London. The extended festival featured performances of Crane's works by ensembles such as Plus-minus ensemble, EXAUDI vocal ensemble, and Apartment House.

He is currently Professor of Composition at the Guildhall School of Music and Drama.

== Compositional style ==
A 1995 Gramophone review described Crane's music as "as minimal as you can get, and irresistibly droll".

In the program for a concert in Oslo, Norway in April 2013, Crane writes that "I use simple and basic musical objects; common chords and intervals, arpeggios, drones, cadences, fragments of scales and melodies. The materials may seem familiar - perhaps even rather ordinary - but my aim is to find a fresh beauty in these objects by placing them in new structural and formal contexts..."

== Personal life ==
Laurence Crane was born in 1961 in Oxford. He read music at the University of Nottingham with Peter Nelson and Nigel Osborne.

His brother is the philosopher Tim Crane.

== Notable works ==
- John White in Berlin
- 20th Century Music
- Raimondas Rumsas
- Pieces About Art
- Sparling
- Holt Quartet
- Old Life was Rubbish
- Sound of Horse
- Slow Folk Tune: Sheringham
- Cobbled Section After Cobbled Section
- See Our Lake
- Birthday piece for Michael Finnissy
- Natural World
