= Ričardas Kabelis =

Lithuanian composer

Ričardas Kabelis (born 28 October 1957 in Panevėžys) studied composition with Prof. Julius Juzeliūnas at the Lithuanian Academy of Music, where he subsequently became a doctoral student (1983–87) and received his D.H. for research on dynamics of timbre in the 20th century works for orchestra in 1989. From 1987 to 1990 he was on the faculty of the Academy, teaching instrumentation.

== Study abroad ==
In 1990 Kabelis went to study electronic and computer music in Germany on a two-year fellowship granted by the German Academic Exchange Service (DAAD). The same year he participated in the Darmstadt summer courses for new music, and next year his Invariations for string quartet garnered him a Stille Musik Prize in Boswil, Switzerland. Since 1991 he has been lecturing at a number of academies and universities in Germany, Switzerland and Austria. From 1993 to 1998 he has spent another two biennial periods of time composing in Germany as a stipendiary of Akademie Schloss Solitude and the DAAD. In 1993 he won the Baden-Württemberg Science Prize for the program in the field of composition entitled "Electronic and Computer Media in Composition", and, in 1995, the prize of the German Science Research Investment Fund for his project "Computer Electronics in Musical Instruction and Composition", which formed the guidelines for the establishment of the Electronic Music Studio at the Lithuanian Academy of Music. Presently he is on the faculty of the Academy, teaching composition. His publications include a number of theoretical studies concerned with the instrumentation and computer aided structuring of microdimensional values.

== Style ==
Ričardas Kabelis' music is in constant demand at various contemporary music events in Lithuania and abroad. The striking austerity, characteristic of the major part of his compositions, seem to flow from the underlying formal procedures he employs such as meticulous reduction of musical material or exposition of certain single attribute chosen beforehand from that material (e.g. rhythm, timbre, pitch, harmony, etc.). Linear progress through time here gives way to varying degrees of intensity of acoustic presence, to the many-faceted exploration of sound's microdimensional depths. As a result of such "conceptual framing", Ričardas Kabelis came to be regarded as one of the most radical figures on the Lithuanian contemporary music scene.
