= James Saunders (composer) =

- Born: 1972 (age 52–53); Kingston upon Thames, England
- Education: Royal Northern College of Music
- Occupations: Composer; Academic teacher
- Organizations: Bath Spa University
- Website: www.james-saunders.com

James Saunders (born 1972) is a British composer and performer of experimental music. He is Professor of Music and Head of the Centre for Musical Research at Bath Spa University.

== Early life ==
Born in Kingston upon Thames, England, Saunders studied at the University of Huddersfield (1991–94) and then with Anthony Gilbert at the Royal Northern College of Music (1994–96). In 1998, he was a participant at the Darmstädter Ferienkurse where he was awarded a scholarship prize. He participated again in 2000 and 2002.

== Career ==
In 2001, he was a selected composer at the Ostrava New Music Days. He held composition residencies at the Experimental Studio fur Akustische Künst in Freiburg in 2003 and 2007.

His music has been played at international festivals, including Bludenz Tage fur zeitgemäßer Musik, Brighton Festival, BMIC Cutting Edge, Borealis, Darmstadt, Donaueschingen Festival, Gothenburg Arts Sounds, Huddersfield Contemporary Music Festival, Inventionen Berlin, The Kitchen, Music We'd Like to Hear, Ostrava New Music Days, Rainy Days, Rational Rec, Roaring Hooves, Spitalfields_Music, SPOR, Ultima, and Wittener Tage für neue Kammermusik

Saunders' music has been performed internationally by ensembles and musicians including Apartment House, Arditti Quartet, asamisimasa, Sebastian Berweck, ensemble chronophonie, duo Contour, Rhodri Davies, Exaudi, Nicolas Hodges, London Sinfonietta, Ensemble Modern, Neue Vocalsolisten, Plus-minus ensemble, Psappha New Music Ensemble, ensemble recherche, Suono Mobile, SWR Sinfonieorchester Baden-Baden und Freiburg, and 175 East.

He is active as a performer of experimental music, notably in the duo Parkinson Saunders with Tim Parkinson and as director of the ensemble Material at Bath Spa University.

Saunders currently serves as a Professor of Music and as the Head of the Centre for Musical Research at Bath Spa University. He is the co-author, with John Lely, of Word Events: Perspectives on Verbal Notation. His research interests include open forms, notation, group behaviours, instrumentalisation, series and modularity. His interviews with composers and improvisers focus on their working methods.

== Music ==
Saunders' work explores modular and serial structures and uses open forms. Series such as #[unassigned] (2000–9) and divisions that could be autonomous but that comprise the whole (2009–11) adopt a variable structure, comprising a selection of modules that can be combined in multiple ways to make new configurations for each performance. His music uses extended instrumental techniques and found objects as a means of exploring the sonic properties of materials. It is “predominantly quiet, with sustained tones, often on the edge of inaudibility, interspersed with shorter sounds, all produced by an instrumentarium that mixes conventional musical instruments with a range of low-tech sound sources”. He used interpersonal cueing systems to control the way his music is structured (things whole and not whole, 2011), and made distributed pieces that allow collaborative input from others (distribution study, 2011).

== Selected works ==
- lots and lots for us to do (2014)
- you say what to do (2014)
- positions in the sequence correctly recalled (2014)
- on bare trees (2014)
- so many territories (2014)
- everybody do this (2014)
- interspersed sometimes with weeds and brambles (2013)
- eight panels (2012)
- what you must do, rather than must not do (2012)
- overlay (2012)
- small template (2012)
- object network (2012–)
- things whole and not whole (2011)
- distribution study (2011)
- location composites (2011–)
- template (with alterations) (2010–)
- surfaces (2010–)
- geometria situs (2009–10)
- divisions that could be autonomous but that comprise the whole (2009–11)
- either/or (2008/9)
- with paper (2006/8, 2009–)
- #[unassigned] (2000–9)
