= Thalia Myers =

- Born: 1945 (age 80–81); England
- Genres: Instrumental
- Occupation: Pianist
- Instrument: Piano
- Labels: Usk Recordings, NMC Recordings, Metronome Recordings
- Website: www.thaliamyers.com

Thalia Myers (born in the West of England in 1945) is a British concert pianist, teacher and animateur.

Her solo recordings include six albums of contemporary works, as well as music by Haydn and Chopin. She is the initiator of the highly successful Spectrum anthologies, published by the ABRSM, and the Chamber Music Exchange.
