= Quatuor Bozzini =

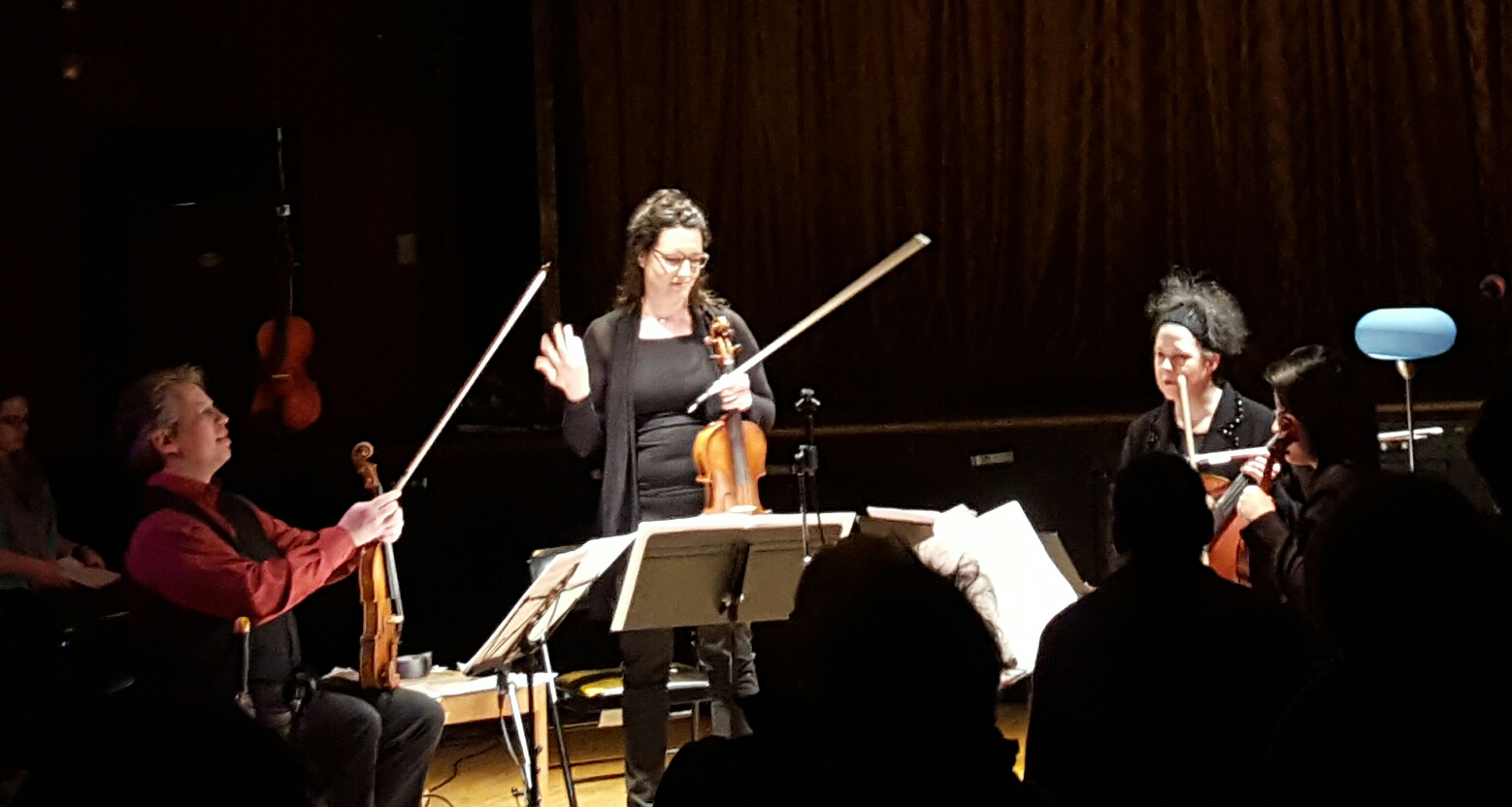
- Quatuor Bozzini performance at La Sala Rossa in Montreal

Background information
- Origin: Montreal, Quebec, Canada
- Genres: Experimental music
- Occupation: String quartet
- Years active: 1999–present
- Website: quatuorbozzini.ca/en

The Quatuor Bozzini is a string quartet that specializes in new and experimental music. They are based in Montreal, Canada.

== Activity ==
The Quatuor Bozzini is known for its numerous collaborations with composers of new and experimental music. Since its founding in 1999, the quartet has commissioned over 130 new works, and has premiered more than 200 other new works. The quartet collaborates closely with the Wandelweiser Group, an international group of composers and performers dedicated to experimental music, in addition to the SMCQ. The ensemble presents an annual concert series in Montreal entitled the "Salon QB", and maintains an active domestic and international touring schedule. It has been in residency at Concordia University since 2002.

The Quatuor Bozzini has participated in the development and presentation of many interdisciplinary projects. Notable cross-disciplinary collaborators include stage director Jean-Frédéric Messier, dancer and choreographer Marc Boivin, theatrical composer Jennifer Walshe, and videographer Nathalie Bujold.

Other composers the quartet has worked with include Denys Bouliane, Louis Dufort, Christopher Fox, Malcolm Goldstein, Michael Oesterle, Martin Arnold, and James Tenney.

=== Educational initiatives ===
The Quatuor Bozzini runs a number of annual mentorship programs for young and emerging composers such as the Composer's Kitchen and the Bozzini Lab, and co-directs the Concordia Creative Music Institute for young performers of contemporary music.

== Recordings ==
The Quatuor Bozzini records primarily under its label Collection QB, founded in 2004; it has released 15 records consisting of both commissioned pieces and experimental works from the 20th and 21st centuries. These recordings appear frequently in Canada on the CBC and on numerous foreign radio stations.

=== Discography ===
- Hardscrabble Songs - Malcolm Goldstein (2002) In situ
- Portrait Montréal - Vivier: Pulau Dewata; Lesage: Quatuor à cordes no 2; Oesterle: Daydream Mechanics V; Goldstein: A New Song of Many Faces for In These Times (2004) Collection QB
- Steve Reich: Different Trains (2005) Collection QB
- Jürg Frey: String Quartets (2006) Edition Wandelweiser
- Canons + Hoquets - Skempton: Catch; Tendrils; Kondo: Kypsotony; Fern; Mr Bloomfield, His Spacing (2007) Collection QB
- Und. Ging. Außen. Vorüber. (2007) Wergo
- Arbor Vitae: James Tenney - Quatuors + Quintettes (2008) Collection QB
- Le livre des mélancolies (with Jean-Guy Boisvert) - Grella-Możejko: ...River to the Ocean...; Lesage: Le livre des mélancolies; Brady: Slow Dances. (2008) Atma
- Michel Gonneville: Hozhro (with Marianne Lambert and Mathieu Golin) (2009) Collection QB
- À chacun sa miniature - 31 compositeurs (2011) Collection QB
- Martin Arnold: Aberrare - Arnold: contact; vault; Liquidambars; Slew & Hop; Aberrare (Casting) (2011) Collection QB
- Daniel Rothman, Ernstalbrecht Stiebler: Sens(e) Absence - Stiebler: Sehr langsam; Rothman: Sense Absence (2011) Collection QB
- Jean Dermoe, Joanne Hétu: Le mensonge et l'identité (2011) Collection QB
- Still Image: Chamber music by Owen Underhill - Underhill: String Quartet No. 4 - The Night; Still Image; String Quartet No. 3 - The Alynne; Trombone Quintet (with Jeremy Berkman) (2012) Centrediscs
- John Cage: Four - Cage: String Quartet in Four Parts; Thirty Pieces for String Quartet; Four (2014) Collection QB
- Jürg Frey: String Quartet No.3; Unhörbare Zeit (with Lee Ferguson and Christian Smith, percussion) (2015) Edition Wanderweiser
- Cassandra Miller: Just So; String Quartets (2018) Another Timbre
- Phil Niblock: Baobab/Disseminate as Five String Quartets (2019) Collection QB

== Recognition ==
Over the past 15 years, the ensemble has received many prizes for its work.

Opus prize from the Conseil québecois de la musique (CQM)

- Discovery of the Year (2002)
- Contemporary Disc of the Year (2004)
- International Outreach (2008)

Other prizes

- Étoile-Galaxie Prize from Radio-Canada (2001)
- Ernst von Siemens Musikstiftung (2007)
- German Record Critics Prize (for Arbor Vitae) (2009)
- Grand Prix du Conseil des Arts de Montréal Finalist (2012)

== Members ==
=== Current members ===
- Clemens Merkel (violin)
- Alissa Cheung (violin)
- Stéphanie Bozzini (viola)
- Isabelle Bozzini (cello)

=== Past members ===
- Mira Benjamin (violin)
- Charles-Étienne Marchand (violin)
- Nadia Francavilla (violin)
- Geneviève Beaudry (violin)
