= Linda Catlin Smith =

American composer (born 1957)

Linda Catlin Smith (born 1957 in New York City) is a composer based in Toronto, Ontario, Canada. In 2005 she became the second woman to win the Jules Léger Prize for New Chamber Music.

Smith studied composition and theory with Allen Shawn in New York, and with composers Rudolf Komorous, Martin Bartlett, John Celona, Michael Longton, and Jo Kondo at the University of Victoria in British Columbia; and attended lectures of Morton Feldman, by invitation, in Buffalo, New York. She studied piano with Nurit Tilles and Gilbert Kalish at the State University of New York at Stony Brook, and with Kathleen Solose in Victoria, British Columbia, where she also studied harpsichord with Erich Schwandt.

She moved to Toronto in 1981, where she produced a series of concerts at Mercer Union Gallery. She was Artistic Director of Arraymusic, one of Toronto's major contemporary music ensembles, from 1988 - 1993. She is a member of the performance collective, URGE. She has given lectures at many universities in Canada, and has taught composition privately and at Wilfrid Laurier University. Outside of teaching, her time is devoted to writing music.

Drawn to an ambiguity of harmony and narrative, her work is informed by her appreciation of the work of writers and painters, including: Marguerite Duras, Cormac McCarthy, Cy Twombly, Giorgio Morandi, Mark Rothko, Agnes Martin, and Joseph Cornell, among many others.

== Zart ==
"Zart" is a classical music composition written by Linda Catlin Smith at the request of The Music Gallery for pianist Anthony de Mare. Its first performance was on April 8, 1989. "Zart" has been recorded by Louise Bessette.

== Recognition ==
In 2019, The Guardian ranked Smith's Piano Quintet (2014) the 22nd greatest work of art music since 2000, with Kate Molleson writing, "Catlin Smith's music is slow and quiet but it's also lush. More than any minimalist, she takes her cues from Couperin, Debussy and the paintings of Agnes Martin. The results are sparse, rugged and sensual; quiet does not have to mean soft."

== See also ==
- Music of Canada
- List of Canadian composers
