= Michael Finnissy =

English composer and pianist

- Born: 17 March 1946 (age 80); Tulse Hill, London, England
- Education: Royal College of Music
- Occupations: Composer; Pianist; Academic teacher
- Organizations: Royal Academy of Music; University of Sussex; University of Southampton

Michael Peter Finnissy (born 17 March 1946) is an English composer, pianist, and pedagogue. An immensely prolific composer, his music is "notable for its dramatic urgency and expressive immediacy".

Although he rejects the label, he is often regarded as one of the foremost composers of the New Complexity movement.

== Biography ==
=== Early life ===
Michael Finnissy was born in Tulse Hill, London, on 17 March 1946 to Rita Isolene née Parsonson and George Norman Finnissy. His father was employed at the London County Council.

When he was four, he received his first piano lessons from his great-aunt Rose Louise (Rosie) Hopwood, soon after writing his first compositions.

He attended Hawes Down Infant and Junior schools, Bromley Technical High School, and Beckenham and Penge Grammar School, and excelled in graphic art, mathematics, and English literature.

=== Student years ===
Finnissy received the William Hurlstone composition prize at the Croydon Music Festival, a factor which assisted his parents' decision to let him apply to music college.

He was then awarded a Foundation Scholarship to study at the Royal College of Music, piano with Edwin Benbow and Ian Lake, and composition with Bernard Stevens and Humphrey Searle. Soon after, he received an Octavia travelling scholarship to study in Italy with Roman Vlad. Finnissy was then able to befriend Brian Ferneyhough.

In 1968, he wrote his first proper compositions.

=== Professional career ===
To earn money for his classes he took up a job as a répétiteur and freelanced at the London Contemporary Dance School and founded a department there, as well as working with numerous choreographers.

In 1972 he made his concert début in the Galerie Schwartzes Kloster in Freiburg im Breisgau. Meanwhile, he had been appearing around Europe.

Finnissy's first job as a composition teacher was at Dartington Summer School where he taught along with his colleague Ferneyhough and signed contracts with numerous publishers, including Oxford University Press.

He has been a member of the ensemble Suoraan (founded by James Clarke and Richard Emsley) and then its artistic director since the early 1970s, then joining Ixion (founded and still directed by Andrew Toovey) in 1987 - in both of these groups he not only played the piano but also conducted concerts.

Finnissy was invited to join by Justin Connolly to join the International Society for Contemporary Music and was president from 1990 to 1996. He is currently an Honorary Member.

He has attached to C.O.M.A. (initially known as the East London Late Starters Orchestra) since its inception, and is composer-in-residence Victorian College of the Arts and to the Gay and Lesbian Mardi Gras in Sydney. He has taught at the Royal Academy of Music, the University of Sussex, and is professor of composition at the University of Southampton and composer-in-residence at St. John's College, Cambridge. He won a competition to supply a violin solo test piece to the 1990 Carl Flesch International Violin Competition with Enek.

Finnissy completed his Verdi Transcriptions for piano (which he started in 1972) in 2005.

He is a homosexual.

== Music ==
=== Style ===
Finnissy is a profusely prolific composer, having written over 400 pieces for numerous ensembles, combinations, and instruments. His works for the piano are notable for their extreme demands on technique. They include his 36 Verdi Transcriptions, written between 1972 and 2005.

Finnissy is concerned with the political aspects of music, and he believes that all music is 'programmatic' to some degree, that is, a composition exists in not just the composer's mind, but inside a culture that reflects both the extra-musical and purely musical concerns of the composer. He rejects the idea that music is unable to express anything other than itself (as Stravinsky said); Finnissy considers music a force for change. His engagement with political and social themes became more frequent as his career progressed. For example, the influence of homosexual themes and concerns began to enter his work; as in Shameful Vice in 1994, and more explicitly in Seventeen Immortal Homosexual Poets in 1997.

== Bibliography ==
- Arnone, Augustus. 2013/2014. "The Ear Is Not A Camera: The Divide Between Visual And Acoustic Perceptual Habits In Finnissy's The History of Photography in Sound". The Open Space Magazine 15/16: 251–268.
- Barrett, Richard. 1995. "Michael Finnissy: An Overview". Contemporary Music Review 13, no. 1:23–43.
- Bortz, Graziela. 2003. Rhythm in the Music of Brian Ferneyhough, Michael Finnissy, and Arthur Kampela: A Guide for Performers. Ph.D. Thesis, City University of New York.
- Brougham, Henrietta, Christopher Fox, and Ian Pace (eds.). 1997. Uncommon Ground: The Music of Michael Finnissy. Aldershot, Hants., and Brookfield, VT: Ashgate. ISBN 1-85928-356-X.
- Pace, Ian. 1996. "The Panorama of Michael Finnissy: I". Tempo, no. 196 (1996), 25–35.
- Pace, Ian. 1997. "The Panorama of Michael Finnissy: II". Tempo, no. 201 (1997), 7–16.
- Steenhuisen, Paul. "Interview with Michael Finnissy". In Sonic Mosaics: Conversations with Composers. Edmonton: University of Alberta Press, 2009. ISBN 978-0-88864-474-9
- Toop, Richard. 1988. "Four Facets of the 'New Complexity'". Contact, no. 32:4–50.
