= Sebastian Hilli =

Finnish composer

Sebastian Hilli (born 20 May 1990 in Helsinki) is a Finnish composer. Hilli studied composition at the Sibelius Academy and at the University of Music and Performing Arts Vienna with Lauri Kilpiö, Michael Jarrell and Veli-Matti Puumala and orchestral conducting at Estonian Academy of Music and Theatre with Arvo Volmer. Hilli's works are published exclusively by Schott Music.

Hilli's first orchestral work Reachings won the International Toru Takemitsu Composition Award in Tokyo in 2015 and was the selected work in the "composers under 30" category in the 64th International Rostrum of Composers in Palermo, Italy in 2017. Hilli is the winner of the Gaudeamus Award 2018. Hilli's orchestral work Snap Music was awarded the Teosto Prize in 2019.

In May 2025, Pekka Kuusisto premiered Hilli's 37-minute violin concerto, 1977 – a Violin Concerto, with the Finnish Radio Symphony Orchestra and Nicholas Collon.

Hilli's works have been performed for example by BBC National Orchestra of Wales, Royal Stockholm Philharmonic Orchestra, Tokyo Philharmonic Orchestra, Finnish Radio Symphony Orchestra, Helsinki Philharmonic Orchestra and by conductors such as Ryan Bancroft, John Storgårds, Hannu Lintu, Jukka-Pekka Saraste, Anna-Maria Helsing, Nicholas Collon, André de Ridder, Olari Elts and Bas Wiegers and musicians such as Pekka Kuusisto, Nicolas Hodges, Anu Komsi. Hilli's largest work so far is 45-minute-long Affekt, premiered by Helsinki Philharmonic Orchestra, a 250-member choir and conducted by Leif Segerstam in 2017.

== Main works ==
=== Orchestra and orchestra with soloist ===
- Cupido (2024-2025), 45', clarinet solo, orchestra and acrobatics and light ad lib, commissioned by Hiljaisuus ry and Lapland Chamber Orchestra
- 1977 – a Violin Concerto (2023), 37', violin solo and orchestra, commissioned by Finnish Radio Symphony Orchestra, BBC Radio 3 and National Arts Centre Canada
- You Are the Earth Beneath You (Du är jorden under dig) (2022-2023), 34', soprano and orchestra, commissioned by Anu Komsi
- Miracle (2020), 20', orchestra, commissioned by Finnish Radio Symphony Orchestra
- Cinema (2019-2020), 20', string orchestra, commissioned by Ostrobothnian Chamber Orchestra
- Peach (2019), 9', orchestra, commissioned by Finnish Chamber Orchestra
- Snap Music (2017-2018), 15', orchestra, commissioned by Finnish Radio Symphony Orchestra
- Affekt (2016-2017), 45', choirs and orchestra, commissioned by HSMF
- Reachings (2014), 15', orchestra

=== Ensemble and chamber ===
- String Quartet No. 2 – Lion’s Teeth (2024), string quartet, 21', commissioned by Our Festival
- Misty Peaks (2023-2024), 30', organ, electronics and ensemble, commissioned by Susanne Kujala and defunensemble
- Palace (2023), 10', cl, vl, vc, pno, commissioned by Rusk Festival
- Teddy (2023), 15', solo accordion, commissioned by Janne Valkeajoki
- Hibernation (2021-2022), large ensemble, electronics, animation, commissioned by International Ensemble Modern Academy, IRCAM-Centre Pompidou, Time of Music Festival and Gaudeamus Muziekweek
- Honeymoon (2021), 28', trumpet solo and large ensemble, commissioned by Uusinta Ensemble and Ensemble Musikfabrik
- Peach (2019, rev. 2020), 9', large ensemble, commissioned by Finnish National Opera and Ballet
- Bird (2019), 16', large ensemble, commissioned by Gaudeamus Muziekweek
- Butterfly Curve (2018), 16', chamber ensemble, commissioned by International Music Council and Swedish Radio
- Psycho Wood (2018), 10', percussion quartet and tape, commissioned by Gaudeamus Muziekweek
- Paraphrase II – ”Giant steps and eden acid” (2016), 20', commissioned by Uusinta Ensemble
