= Teosto Prize =

The Teosto Prize is an annual award presented since 2003 by the Finnish Composers' Copyright Society, Teosto, to promote Finnish creative music by highlighting bold, original, and innovative works. The prize can be awarded up to 4 works or collections of works, with a monetary value of €40,000. If there is only one recipient, the prize amounts to €25,000. The recipient is selected by a three-member jury appointed by Teosto, from a shortlist of nominees chosen by a preliminary panel. In 2010 and 2021, the prize was not awarded.

== Prize winners ==
- 2003
  - Maija Vilkkumaa the songs on the album Ei
  - Kimmo Pohjosen work Kalmuk
  - Kimmo Hakola's work for orchestra Le Sacrifice
- 2004
  - Jukka Tiensuu's work for big band Umori
  - Ilmiliekki-quartet's works on the album March of the Alpha Males
- 2005
  - Veli-Matti Puumala's piano concerto Seeds of Time
  - Tuomari Nurmio's compositions and Alamaailman vasarat -group's arrangements Kinaporin kalifaatti -levyllä
- 2006
  - Marzi Nyman's works on the album Marzi
  - Sampo Haapamäki work Kirjo
- 2007
  - Olli Kortekankaan music in the opera Isän tyttö received half the prize
  - Jonna Tervomaa's lyrics and compositions on the album Parempi loppu
  - Jussi Jaakonaho's compositions on the album Parempi loppu
- 2008
  - Asa's works on the album Loppuasukas got half the prize and the other half was awarded the workgroup of the same album.
- 2009
  - Magnus Lindberg with his work Graffiti
  - Mira Luoti, Jori Sjöroos and Paula Vesala for their works on PMMP's album Veden varaan
- 2011
  - Sebastian Fagerlund for his clarinet concerto Ignite
  - Christel Sundberg for her works on Chisu's album Vapaa ja yksin
  - Wimme Saari, Tapani Rinne and Tuomas Norvio works on the album Mun
- 2012
  - Milla Viljamaa for her album Minne
- 2013
  - Anna Eriksson for her album Mana
  - Matthew Whittall for his composition Dulcissima, clara, sonans.
- 2014
  - Risto Ylihärsilä for his album II
- 2015
  - Mikko Hassinenfor his works on the album Elektro GT
- 2016
  - Antti Auvinen's composition and Harry Salmenniemi's libretto for the chamber opera Autuus
  - Malarian pelko – Paperi T (Henri Pulkkinen, Niko Liinamaa, Miska Soini, Roope Kinnunen, Kristo Laanti, Sandra Tervonen and Juuso Malin)
- 2017
  - Mikko Joensuu for his compositions, lyric and arrangements on the albums Amen 1 and Amen 2
- 2018
  - Astrid Swan for her album From the Bed and Beyond
  - Joona Toivanen Trio for _XX_
- 2019
  - Color Dolor (Stina Koistinen and Nicolas Rehn) for the album Love
  - Sebastian Hilli for his composition Snap Music
- 2020
  - Jesse Markin and Totte Rautiainen for their compositions and lyrics on the album Folk.
- 2021
  - The prize was not awarded due to the pandemic
- 2022
  - Johanna Rasmuksen (Yona) and her work group for the works on Yona's album Uni johon herään
  - Cecilia Damström's composition ICE
  - Linda Fredriksson's compositions on the album Juniper
  - Eevil Stöö and his work group for the works on Eevil Stöö's albumMarsipan Wave.
- 2023
  - Mikko Sarvanne's compositions on the Mikko Sarvanne Garden album Heräämisen valkea myrsky,
  - Helmi Kajasteen and work group for the works on Draama-Helmi's albumDraama-Helmi kuistilla
  - Sanna Ahvenjärvi's ja Tapio Lappalainen's compositions Water.
