= International Rostrum of Composers =

Annual forum for the promotion of contemporary classical music

The International Rostrum of Composers (IRC) is an annual forum organized by the International Music Council that offers broadcasting representatives the opportunity to exchange and publicize pieces of contemporary classical music. It is funded by contributions from participating national radio networks.

The first Rostrum took place in 1954 and involved delegates from the German, French, Belgian and Swiss national broadcasting companies. From then until 2002 the Rostrum's sessions were held at UNESCO's headquarters in Paris, with the exception of 2000 when they were hosted by Muziek Groep Nederland and the Gaudeamus Foundation in Amsterdam. Since 2003, a rotation system has been in place, where the Rostrum is hosted every other year by Radio France and in the intervening year visits a European venue. Starting from 2010 the Rostrum is travelling around Europe by invitation of National Radio Broadcasters. Rostrum in 2020 was postponed until 2021.

Over thirty national radio networks now send delegates, presenting in total sixty or so works each year that have been composed no more than five years previously. Following sessions of listening and discussion, the delegates highlight one of the works submitted (that year's "selected work") and recommend a number of the others. They also highlight one or two works by composers under the age of thirty and recommend one or two others. These selected and recommended works are those most likely to be broadcast or played in concerts sponsored by the participating networks or others that follow the Rostrum's deliberations. All works presented are offered by the European Broadcasting Union to its members via satellite. Copies of recordings, scores and notes featured during the forum are kept at the Gaudeamus Foundation.

From 1991 until 2003 the composer of each year’s selected work was awarded the UNESCO Mozart Medal. Since 2004 the composer of each year’s selected work is awarded the UNESCO Picasso-Miró Medal and the composer or composers under the age of thirty whose work or works are selected are awarded the Guy Huot Bursary for young composers.

Since 2015, the International Rostrum of Composers is part of a large project called Rostrum+ a cooperation project co-funded by the Creative Europe programme of the European Union which aims to rethink the ways in which contemporary music connects with audiences through radio network by exploring new strategies to develop audiences, promote new music, enhance the skills of radio professionals and inspire cooperation between musicians, higher music education institutions and broadcasting companies throughout Europe and beyond.

The selected composer in the General Category of each edition receive a joint commission Radio France / IMC for an Alla Breve composition that are performed by musicians of the Orchestre Philharmonique de Radio France, recorded and broadcast by Radio France in a special program called Alla Breve.

Swedish Radio and IMC jointly commission a work to the composer selected in the “Under 30” category. The composer is invited to Sweden for an introductory 2-day workshop with a local ensemble and then write a work for them which is broadcast live by the Swedish Radio.

== List of winners ==
The International Rostrum of Composers has two main categories:

- **the general category** (the names of the winners are listed in bold)
- the category of composers under 30 years of age.

Usually there is one winner in each category, but sometimes there are more winners.

2025 – Held in Ljubljana, Slovenia

- **Gundega Šmite** (1977, Latvia): **The White Birds** for string trio (2024)
- Darja Kukal Moiseeva (1998, Czech Republic): Calmness II for clarinet and vibraphone (2022-2023)

2024 - Held in Vilnius, Lithuania

- **Rafał Ryterski** (1992, Poland): **Totentanz** for countertenor, orchestra and electronics (2022)
- Thomas van Dun (1995, Netherlands): Rocailles de l'après-vie… for large ensemble (2023)

2023 - Held in The Hague, Netherlands

- **Lisa Streich** (1985, Sweden): **Jubelhemd** for trumpet, percussion, harp, viola and orchestra (2021)
- **Othman Louati** (1988, France): **Nuits** for chamber ensemble (2022)
- Matic Romih (1996, Slovenia): The Card Players (Kvartopirci) for string orchestra (2018)

2022 - Held in Palermo, Italy

- **Kristine Tjøgersen** (1982, Norway): **Between trees** for orchestra (2021)
- Monika Szpyrka (1993, Poland): Part among Parts for solo accordion and orchestra (2021)

2021 – Held in Belgrade, Serbia

- **Ivana Ognjanović** (1971, Serbia): **Lonesome Skyscraper** for orchestra and electronics (2019)
- Krists Auznieks (1992, Latvia): Are one for voice, chamber orchestra and electronics (2021)

2019 – Held in San Carlos de Bariloche, Argentina.

- **Petra Strahovnik** (1986, Slovenia): **Prana** for orchestra (2018)
- Jēkabs Jančevskis (1992, Latvia): When for choir and cello (2016)

2018 – Held in Budapest, Hungary.

- **Páll Ragnar Pálsson** (1977, Iceland): **Quake** for cello and orchestra (2018)
- Jan-Peter de Graaff (1992, Netherlands): Le café de nuit for orchestra (2017)

2017 – Held in Palermo, Italy.

- **Artur Zagajewski** (1978, Poland): **Brut** for cello and ensemble (2014)
- Sebastian Hilli (1990, Finland): Reachings for orchestra (2014)

2016 – Held in Wroclaw, Poland.

- **Oscar Bianchi** (1975, Switzerland): **Partendo** for countertenor and ensemble (2015)
- Maria Kõrvits (1987, Estonia): Langedes ülespoole, taeva kaarjasse kaussi for orchestra (2015)

2015 – Held in Tallinn, Estonia.

- **Jan Erik Mikalsen** (1979, Norway): **Songr for Orchestra** (2014)
- Matej Bonin (1986, Slovenia): Cancro for symphony orchestra (2015)

2014 – Held in Helsinki, Finland.

- **Yannis Kyriakides** (1969, Cyprus): **Words and Song without Words**, for cello and electronics (2013)
- Andrzej Kwieciński (1984, Poland): Canzon de' Baci, tenor and orchestra (2013)

2013 – Held in Prague, Czech republic.

- **Agata Zubel** (1978, Poland): **Not I**, for voice, chamber ensemble and electronics (2010)
- Úlfur Hansson (1988, Iceland): So very strange, electroacoustic work (2011)

2012 – Held in Stockholm, Sweden.

- **Pedro Ochoa** (1968, Argentina): **Tierra Viva**, for piano and tape (2011)
- Peter Kerkelov (1984, Bulgaria): Attempt at Screaming, ensemble (2011)

2011 – Held in Vienna, Austria.

- **Francesco Filidei** (1973, Italy): **Macchina per scoppiare Pagliacci**, for double orchestra (2005)
- Juan Pablo Nicoletti (1983, Argentina): Abismo al Abismo, electroacoustic work (2011)

2010 – Held in Lisboa, Portugal.

- **Simon Steen-Andersen** (1976, Denmark): **Ouvertures (Part 1)**, for guzheng, sampler and orchestra (2008)
- Kristaps Pētersons (1982, Latvia): Twilight Chants, for mixed choir, double bass and glasses (2009)

2009 – Held in Paris, France.

- **Martijn Padding** (1956, Netherlands): **First Harmonium Concerto**, for harmonium and orchestra (2008)
- Justė Janulytė (1982, Lithuania): Aquarelle, for mixed choir (2007)

2008

- **Misato Mochizuki** (1969, Japan): **L'Heure Bleue**, for orchestra (2007)
- Florent Motsch (1980, France): Memoire du Vent, for orchestra (2006)

2007

- **Erin Gee** (1974, USA): **Mouth Piece IX**, for voice and orchestra (2006)
- Ülo Krigul (1978, Estonia): Jenzeits, for orchestra (2005)

2006

- **Arnulf Herrmann** (1968, Germany): **Terzenseele**, for ensemble (2005–06)
- Ēriks Ešenvalds (1977, Latvia): Légende de la femme emmurée, for mixed choir (2005)

2005

- **Mārtiņš Viļums** (1974, Latvia): **Le temps scintille...**, for mixed choir (2003)
- Luke Bedford (1978, United Kingdom): Rode with darkness, for large orchestra (2003)

2004

- **Helena Tulve** (1972 Estonia): **Sula (Thawing)**, for orchestra (1999)
- Santa Ratniece (1977, Latvia): Sens nacre, for ensemble (2004)
- Abigail Richardson-Schulte (1976, Canada): Dissolve, for harp, piano, percussion (2002)

2003 (the 50th edition)

- **Hanna Kulenty** (1961, Poland): **Trumpet Concerto**, for trumpet and symphony orchestra (2002)
- Johannes Maria Staud (1974, Austria): Polygon for piano and orchestra (2002)

2002

- **Anders Hillborg** (1954, Sweden): **Dreaming River**, for orchestra (1999)
- Daniel Vacs (1972, Argentina): Viento negro, for violin (2002)

2001

- **Uljas Pulkkis** (1975, Finland): **Enchanted Garden**, for violin and orchestra (2000)
- Brian Current (1972, Canada): For the time being, for orchestra (1999)

2000

- **Georg Friedrich Haas** (1953, Austria): **Violin Concerto**, for violin and orchestra (1998)
- Jüri Reinvere (1971, Estonia): Loodekaar, for chamber ensemble (1998)

1999

- **Brett Dean** (1961, Australia): **Ariel's Music**, for clarinet and orchestra (1995)
- **Rolf Wallin** (1957, Norway): **Ground**, for cello and string orchestra (1997)
- Maja Ratkje (1973, Norway): Waves II B, for chamber orchestra (1997–78)

1998

- **Pascal Dusapin** (1955, France): **Watt**, for trombone and orchestra (1994)
- Tommi Kärkkäinen (1969, Finland): Seven miniatures, for orchestra (1996)

1997

- **Marc-Andre Dalbavie** (1961, France): **Violin Concerto**, for violin and orchestra (1997)
- Thomas Heinisch (1968, Austria): Abglanz und Schweigen, for chamber ensemble (1996)

1996

- **Pär Lindgren** (1952, Sweden): **Oaijé**, for orchestra (1993)
- Mari Vihmand (1967, Estonia): Floreo, for orchestra (1995–96)

1995

- **Michio Kitazume** (1948, Japan): **Ei-Sho**, for orchestra (1993)
- Paweł Mykietyn (1971, Poland): 3 for 13, for chamber orchestra (1994)

1994

- **Eero Hämeenniemi** (1951, Finland): **Nattuvanar**, for chamber ensemble (1993)
- Thomas Adès (1971, United Kingdom): Living Toys, for chamber orchestra (1993)

1993

- **Kimmo Hakola** (1958, Finland): **Capriole**, for bass and cello (1991)
- Gisle Kverndokk (1967, Norway): Initiation, for violin and orchestra (1992)

1992

- **Esa-Pekka Salonen** (1955, Finland): **Floof**, for soprano and chamber orchestra (1982)
- Jesper Koch (1967, Denmark): Icebreaking, for two accordion and percussion (1991)

1991

- **Thomas Demenga** (1954, Switzerland): **Solo per due**, for cello and orchestra (1990)
- Chris Harman (1970, Canada): Iridescence, for 24 strings (1990)

1990

- **Édith Canat de Chizy** (1950, France): **Yell**, for orchestra (1985)
- Benoît Mernier (1964, Belgium): Artifices, for organ (1989)

1989

- **Daniel Börtz** (1943, Sweden): **Parodos**, for orchestra (1987)
- Jukka Koskinen (1965, Finland): String Quartet, (1987)

1988

- **Jukka Tiensuu** (1948, Finland): **Tokko**, for male choir and computer-generated tape (1987)
- Srđan Dedić (1965, Croatia): Snake Charmer, for bass clarinet (1986)

1987

- **Roger Smalley** (1943, Australia): **Piano Concerto**, for piano and orchestra (1985)
- Kimmo Hakola (1958, Finland): String Quartet, (1986)

1986

- **Magnus Lindberg** (1958, Finland): **Kraft**, for clarinet, cello, piano, 2 percussion, orchestra and tape (1983–85)
- Luc Brewaeys (1959, Belgium): E poi c 'era, for orchestra (1985)

1985

- **Alejandro Iglesias Rossi** (1960, Argentina): **Ancestral Rites of a Forgotten Culture**, mezzo and 6 percussion (1983)
- George Benjamin (1960, United Kingdom): At first light, oboe and orchestra (1982)

1984

- **Eugeniusz Knapik** (1951, Poland): **String Quartet**, (1980)
- Alessandro Solbiati (1956, Italy): Di Luce, for violin and orchestra (1982)

1983

- **György Kurtág** (1926, Hungary): **Messages de feu demoiselle R.V. Troussova**, soprano and chamber orchestra (1976–80)
- Detlev Müller-Siemens (1957, Germany): Passacaglia, for orchestra (1978)

1982

- **Yoshihisa Taira** (1938, France): **Meditations**, for orchestra (1982)
- Magnus Lindberg (1958, Finland): ... de Tartuffe, je crois, for piano quintet (1981)

1981

- **Frédéric van Rossum** (1939, Belgium): **Réquisitoire**, for brass ensemble and percussion (1973)
- Jouni Kaipainen (1956, Finland): Trois morceaux de l’aube, for cello and piano (1980–81)

1980

- **Aleksander Lasoń** (1951, Poland): **Symphony No. 1**, for brass, percussion and 2 pianos (1975)
- Akira Nishimura (1953, Japan): Ketiak, for 6 percussion (1979)

1979

- **Charles Chaynes** (1925, France): **Pour un monde noir**, 4 poems for soprano and orchestra (1976)

1978

- **Manfred Trojahn** (1949, Germany): **String Quartet** (1976)

1977

- **Louis Andriessen** (1939, Netherlands): **De Staat**, for 4 female vocal soloists and 27 instruments (1972–76)

1976

- **Tomás Marco** (1942, Spain): **Autodafé**, for piano, organ, three instrumental groups, and violins in echo (1975)
- **Dimitar Tapkov** (1929, Bulgaria): **Cantate pour la paix**, for soprano, choir and orchestra (1975)

1975

- **Zsolt Durkó** (1934, Hungary): **Burial prayer**, oratorios for tenor, baritone, choir and orchestra (1967–72)

1974

- **Hans Kox** (1930, Netherlands): **L 'Allegri**, soprano and orchestra, (1967)

1973

- **Henryk Górecki** (1933, Poland): **Ad Matrem**, for soprano, choir and orchestra (1971)

1972

- **Sándor Balassa** (1935, Hungary): **Requiem for Lajos reserve**, for choir and orchestra (1968–69)

1971

- **George Crumb** (1929, USA): **Ancient Voices of Children**, soprano and octet (1970)

1970

- **András Szőllősy** (1921, Hungary): **Concerto No. 3**, for sixteen strings (1969)
- Steven Gellman (1947, Canada): Mythos II, for flute and string quartet (1968)

1969

- **György Ligeti** (1923, Hungary/Austria): **Lontano**, for orchestra (1967)

1968

- **Jan Kapr** (1914, Czechoslovakia): **Exercises pour Gydli**, for soprano, flute and harp (1967)
- **Witold Lutosławski** (1913, Poland): **Symphony No. 2**, for orchestra (1966–7)
- **John Tavener** (1944, United Kingdom): **The Whale**, dramatic cantata (1966)

1967

- **Franco Donatoni** (1927, Italy): **Puppenspiel No**, for flute and orchestra (1965)
- **Luboš Fišer** (1935, Czechoslovakia): **Fifteen Prints after Dürer’s Apocalypse**, for orchestra (1965)

1966

- **Tadeusz Baird** (1928, Poland): **Four Dialogues**, for oboe and chamber orchestra (1965)

1965

- **Angelo Paccagnini** (1930, Italy): **Wind in the Wind**, for mezzo-soprano and orchestra (1964)
- **Tōru Takemitsu** (1930, Japan): **Textures from the Arc**, for piano and orchestra (1964)

1964

- **Witold Lutosławski** (1913, Poland): **Three poems by Henri Michaux**, for 20 voice choir and orchestra (1963)

1963

- **Tadeusz Baird** (1928, Poland): **Variations without a theme**, for orchestra (1962)

1962

- **Niccolò Castiglioni** (1932, Italy): **Through the Looking Glass**, a radio opera
- **Akira Miyoshi** (1933, Japan): **String Quartet No. 1** (1962)
- **Luigi Nono** (1924, Italy): **España en el corazon**, for soprano, baritone, choir and instruments, (1952)

1961

- **Elliott Carter** (1908, USA): **String Quartet No. 2**, (1959)

1960

- **Humphrey Searle** (1915, United Kingdom): **Diary of a Madman**, opera (1958)

1959

- **Tadeusz Baird** (1928, Poland): Four Essays, for orchestra (1958)
- **Witold Lutosławski** (1913, Poland): **Funeral Music**, for string orchestra (1956–8)

1958

- **Niccolò Castiglioni** (1932, Italy): **Symphony No. 1**, for soprano and orchestra (1956)
- **Benjamin Lees** (1924, USA): **String Quartet No.1** (1952)
- **Constantin Regamey** (1907, Switzerland): **Cinq Etudes**, for female voice and orchestra (1956)

1957

- **Ingvar Lidholm** (1921, Sweden): **Ritournelle**, orchestra (1955)

1956

- **Frank Martin** (1890, Switzerland): **Cembalo Concerto**, for harpsichord and orchestra (1951–52)
- **Hans Werner Henze** (1926, Germany): **Symphony No. 3** (1949–50)

1955

- **Luciano Berio** (1925, Italy) **Chamber Music**, for voice, clarinet, cello, harp (1953)
- **Henri Dutilleux** (1916, France): **Symphony No. 1**, for orchestra (1951)
