= Paul Clift =

Australian classical composer

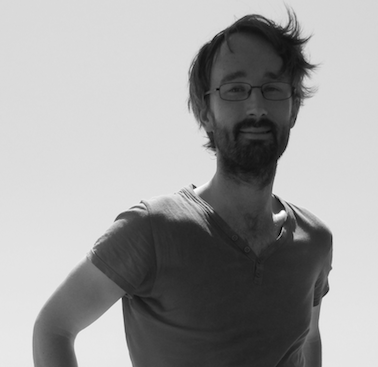
Australian Composer Paul Clift (b. 1978)

Paul Clift (born 21 March 1978) is an Australian composer and sound artist. His works comprise mostly instrumental music, often with electronics, video or other multimedia elements.

== Biography ==
Born in Melbourne, Australia, Paul Clift began his musical education with studies of piano. After graduating with a degree in music composition and linguistics from Monash University, he moved to Paris for further study of composition. In 2006, he earned a master's degree from King's College London. The following year, he returned to Paris where he undertook the IRCAM Cursus de composition et d'informatique musicale. In 2009, he moved to New York for doctoral studies at Columbia University. His doctoral thesis deals with musical temporality and its relationship with memory and perception. While working on his doctorate, he undertook residencies at the Paul Sacher Foundation (Basel), to research alternative temporal/spatial notation systems and novel forms of musical tablature, and at IRCAM, where he collaborated with René Caussé on the development of "Acoustic Aggregate Synthesis", a "real-time performance tool which fuses synthetic and acoustic sound sources to yield a semi-acoustic re-synthesis of a pre-defined acoustic model." His subsequent publications in the latter field have been widely cited in research on hybrid musical instruments.

Among the composition professors which Paul Clift acknowledges as significant influences on his creative outlook are Franck Bedrossian, Fred Lerdahl, Tristan Murail, Fabien Lévy, Philippe Leroux and George Benjamin.

In 2016, he moved to Basel, Switzerland, where he currently resides. From 2016 to 2022, he served as artistic director of neuverBand, a chamber ensemble dedicated to contemporary music. In 2019, his large-scale scenic work "Portal Fantasies" was premiered at the Zeiträume Biennale für neue Musik und Architektur in Basel. From January 2023 until August 2024, he was the artistic director of Freiburg-based Ensemble Recherche. Also in 2023, he became president of the Basel chapter of the International Society for Contemporary Music (Internationale Gesellschaft für Neue Musik, IGNM).

His works have been performed at contemporary music festivals including World Music Days, Agora, Festival Ensemble(s), Weimarer Frühjahrstage für zeitgenössische Musik, Darmstädter Ferienkurse, ReMusik, MATA, Rainy Days Luxembourg, Musikfestival Bern, Sonic Matter Zurich, SMC Lausanne, and Ultima Oslo.

His scores are published by BabelScores, Schweizer Musikedition, and the Australian Music Centre.

== Selected works ==
=== Orchestral and Large Ensemble Works ===
- landscape (overexposed) for orchestra (2025)
- La Géométrie d'après Descartes for orchestra (2020)
- Objets à réaction poétique for 19 instruments (2015)
- qui, dove mezzo son... for flute solo and 8 instruments (2014)
- Infinite Regress for 10 instruments (2011)

=== Chamber Music ===
- state of matter for saxophone, percussion, accordion, piano, cello & electronics (2024)
- colours are like memories of other colours II for saxophone, accordion, percussion, violin & electronics (2024)
- automation of the personalization process for two oboes, electronics and video (2023)
- collective imaginary for chamber ensemble, electronics and video (2022)
- the grammar of shadows for chamber ensemble (2021)
- Tombeau de Clément Ader for chamber ensemble and electronics (2020)
- the great silence for chamber ensemble (2019)
- RGBA for saxophone quartet (2019)
- the past is a foreign country, they do things differently there for flute, saxophone and piano (2019)
- Astatine for saxophone, accordion, cello and electronics (2019)
- V Prostranem Morju Sanj for flute, violin, piano and a fourth performer (2018)
- Shadow Art II for flute, voice and electronics (2018)
- élan vital for flute, clarinet, saxophone and piano (2018)
- The sea isn't rising, the ground is sinking for soprano, saxophone, piano, percussion and electronics (2017)
- the more perfect is the more immaterial for chamber ensemble (2016)
- duet/anagram for two saxophones and electronics (2015)
- Colours are like memories of other colours for string octet and electronics (2014)
- On the celestial hierarchy for chamber ensemble (2014)
- Le détour permet le retour for string quartet, electronics and video (2013)

=== Solo Works ===
- free will generator for solo cello (2024)
- turn me on, dead man for soprano, electronics and video (2020)
- Radotements avec citation for solo trombone (2016)
- presence, absence, degree for accordion and electronics (2015)
- Feuille Volante for solo alto flute (2012)
- 1950-C for solo guitar (2010)

=== Staged Works ===
- Portal Fantasies, a musical, architectural and literary promenade for two actors & five musicians (2019)
- With my limbs in the dark for chamber ensemble, dancer and electronics (2009)
