= Peat, Smoke & Seaweed Storm =

Studio album by Osmo Tapio Räihälä
- Released: 2014
- Genre: Art music, Orchestral music, Contemporary music
- Length: 65:10
- Label: Alba Records
- Producer: Timo Ruottinen

Osmo Tapio Räihälä chronology
Rock Painting (2006)	Peat, Smoke & Seaweed Storm (2014)	Zensolence (2024)

Peat, Smoke & Seaweed Storm is the second album of the Finnish composer Osmo Tapio Räihälä, released in 2014. The music on the album is performed by the Finnish Radio Symphony Orchestra, and two solo performers, the French horn player Jukka Harju and the pianist Matilda Kärkkäinen. The album consists of five works, written between 1999 and 2012. The opening track on the album, Barlinnie Nine, is a "musical portrait" of the Scottish ex-football player and Everton cult hero, Duncan Ferguson. The last track, Ardbeg (The Ultimate Piece for Orchestra) is a "musical landscape" of the Inner Hebrides island Islay, and an hommage to its single malt whisky tradition, and in particular Ardbeg.

== Track listing ==
No.	Title	Length
1.	"Barlinnie Nine"	11:33
2.	"Soliloque 2: La tornade"	7:37
3.	"Iron Rain (Rautasade)"	15:32
4.	"Aflao Highway (I More Than Able 4:59 - II Observers Are Worried 4:17 - III Do Good in Case of Tomorrow 3:36)"	12:52
5.	"Ardbeg (The Ultimate Piece for Orchestra)"	17:04

== Personnel ==
- Osmo Tapio Räihälä – composer, producer (all tracks)
- Timo Ruottinen – executive producer (all tracks)
- Sakari Oramo – conductor (1)
- Dima Slobodeniouk – conductor (3, 5)
- Jukka Harju – French horn (2)
- Matilda Kärkkäinen – piano (4)

== Media reception ==
Peat, Smoke & Seaweed Storm received positive reviews in the music media, and was by then Räihälä's major critical success. For example, the Gramophone magazine stated that "This is a well-recorded disc of attractive music, well worth investigating", and according to MusicWebInternational "Substantial and well worth exploring".

In 2015, Peat, Smoke & Seaweed Storm was nominated for the Independent Music Awards for the best Contemporary Classical album award.

== Notes ==
According to the sleeve notes, the tracks 1 (Barlinnie Nine) and 3 (Iron Rain) are live concert recordings, whereas the rest are studio recordings.
