= 1993 International Rostrum of Composers =

The 1993 International Rostrum of Composers was the 39th edition of the forum. Finnish composer Kimmo Hakola won the UNESCO Mozart Medal with Capriole, a 1991 composition for cello and bass clarinet.

== Recommended Works ==
- (Brazil) Jorge Antunes - Idiosynchronie
- (Belgium) Jean-Luc Fafchamps - Attrition
- (Finland) Kimmo Hakola - Capriole
- (Norway) Alfred Janson - Tarantella
- (Norway) Gisle Kverndokk - Initiation
- (France) Philippe Manoury - La Nuit du Sortilege
- (France) Gerard Pésson - Le Gel par Jeu
- (Slovenia) Uroš Rojko - Atemaj
- (United Kingdom) Mark-Anthony Turnage - Kai
- (Argentina) Ezequiel Viñao - La Noche de las Noches
- (Austria) Herbert Willi - Concerto for Orchestra

=== Under-30 Category ===
- (Italy) Pietro Borradori - String Quartet
- (Norway) Gisle Kverndokk - Initiation
- (Italy) Luca Tessadrelli - St. Lucie's Day
