= Jhett =

Jhett may refer to:

- JHETT (DJ), Japanese DJ and producer of the 2005 song "Just Go"
- Jhett Tolentino (born 1976), Filipino entertainment producer
- Jack E. Jett (1956–2015), American model and television personality
