= Oscar Bianchi =

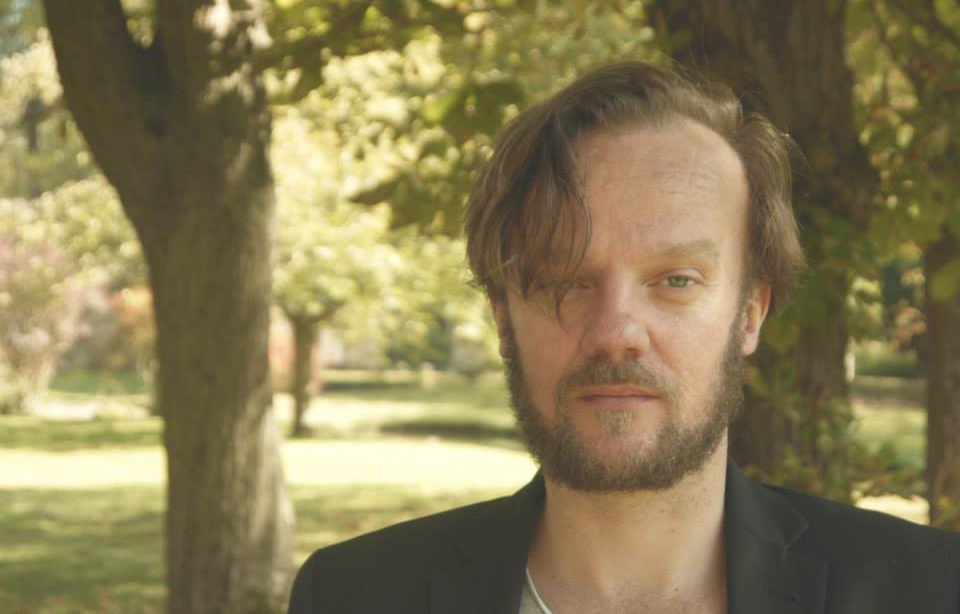
- In Royaumont Abbaye, 27 September 2014

Background information
- Born: Oscar Bianchi; 1975 (age 50–51); Milan, Italy
- Origin: Italy, Switzerland
- Genres: Contemporary classical
- Occupation: Composer
- Years active: 2000-present
- Labels: Cypres, Musiques Suisses, db Records
- Website: www.oscarbianchi.com

Oscar Bianchi (born 1975 in Milan) is a Gaudeamus Laureate composer of Italian and Swiss citizenships. He is a recipient of several international prizes and honors. He is noted for his large scale works, in particular his cantata Matra for six voices and large ensemble and his opera Thanks to My Eyes.

== Biography ==
Oscar Bianchi began music studies at the age of 7 under the guidance of Gabriella Montalbetti. In his teenage years, he enrolled at the Milan Conservatory and studied composition with Adriano Guarnieri, Sandro Gorli, Umberto Rotondi and with Salvatore Sciarrino in Città di Castello. At the Milan Conservatory He also studied Choir music and choral conducting with Franco Monego and electronic music with Riccardo Sinigaglia and with Alvise Vidolin at the Conservatorio Giovanni Battista Martini in Bologna. In 2003 Oscar Bianchi will eventually foster his education in composition with Fausto Romitelli at the Royaumont Abbey. In name of the friendship that the two composers had established since the early 2000 and after the loss of who was seemingly becoming a mentor, Oscar Bianchi dedicated his composition Mezzogiorno to the memory of Fausto Romitelli.

- In 2003 he settles in Paris to attend to the yearlong composition and electronic music master course at IRCAM
- In 2005 he settles in New York City thanks to a fellowships from Columbia University to pursue doctoral studies under the guidance of Tristan Murail
- In 2009 he spends a year in Berlin as guest of the DAAD Künstlerprogramm Berlin
- in 2010 he spends several months in Warsaw as guest of Pro-Helvetia Warsaw at the Ujazdów Castle

== Catalog ==
His works are published by Universal Music Publishing Group

=== Large ensemble, orchestra ===
- Orango, for ensemble and audience (2018)
- Roar, for symphonic orchestra (2017)
- Contingency, for ensemble (2017)
- Exordium, for symphonic orchestra (2015-2016)
- Inventio, for symphonic orchestra (2014-2016)
- Celeste discontinuità, for cello concertante and string orchestra (2013-2014)
- Oneness, for clarinet, basset horn and orchestra (2013)
- Permeability, for 19 instruments and electronics (2013)
- Ajna Prelude, for orchestra (2010)
- Vishudda Concerto, for ensemble (2009)
- Anahata Concerto, for ensemble (2008)
- Trasparente II, for ensemble (2007, rev 2008)
- Aqba, nel soffio tuo dolce, for percussion ensemble (2005)
- Mezzogiorno, for ensemble (2005)

=== Vocal and staged works ===
- Sinatra in Agony, music-theatre (2018)
- Circled Existence, for electric guitar and six voices (2018)
- Partendo, for countertenor and ensemble (2015)
- Here, for soprano and string orchestra (2014)
- The Past, for 11 performers (2014)
- Approve, for countertenor and 8 instruments (2014)
- Fluente, for soprano, barytone and bagpipes (2013)
- Sotto Vuoto, for female voice and percussion (2012)
- Lullaby, for male voice and five musicians (2012)
- Ante Litteram, for six voices a cappella (also for six voices and bass clarinet) (2012-2013)
- The Infinite Jest, for soprano, dancer and actress (2012)
- Thanks to My Eyes, opera in one act, libretto and staging by Joël Pommerat (2011)
- Matra, Cantata for vocal ensemble, instrumental ensemble and trio concertante (2007)
- Primordia Rerum, for soprano and ensemble (2003)

=== Instrumental ===
- Étude no 1, for piano (2018)
- Senza, for recorder and violin (2018)
- Antilope, for bass clarinet, cello and piano (2018)
- Pathos of distance, string quartet no 2 (2017)
- Topologia delle passioni, for wind quintet (2016)
- Alteritas, for bass clarinet (2015)
- Reinforced Sympathy, for two ouds (2015)
- Derogatory Magnifier, for oboe solo (2014)
- Docile ascesa, for contrabass solo (2014)
- De Profundis, for basset horn solo (2011, rev 2013)
- Adesso, string quartet no 1 (2011)
- Schegge, for prepared piano (2011)
- Gr…, for bass flute (2010)
- Semplice, for violin (2010)
- Zaffiro, for four instruments (2005)
- Crepuscolo, for Paetzold contrabass recorder and electronics (2004)
- De Rerum Natura, for flute and violin (2001)
- Pathos of distance, string quartet no 2 (2017)

== Awards ==
- 2016 «Partendo», for countertenor and ensemble wins the 63rd International Music Council International Rostrum of Composers
- 2014 Grand Prix de la Musique SACEM, catégorie Musique Symphonique
- 2013 Portrait CD awarded Preis der Deutschen Schallplattenkritik
- 2013 Crepuscolo CD awarded Nutida Swedish prize
- 2012 Crepuscolo CD nominated for the Swedish Grammy Awards
- 2010 Prix Dussurget, Festival d'Aix-en-Provence
- 2008 Alarm Will Sound competition winner, Alice Tully Hall Reopening Nights Festival, Lincoln Center – New York
- 2005-2007 ICTUS ensemble, Brussels: composer in residence
- 2005 Gaudeamus first prize
- 2004 Aargauer Kuratorium, Switzerland: Career grant (Beitrag an das künstlerische Schaffen)

== Selected discography ==
- Portrait CD, Klangforum Wien, Ensemble Modern, Ictus Ensemble, Nieuw Ensemble, and others. 2013 MGB, CTS-M 138
- Matra, Ictus Ensemble, Neue Vocalsolisten Stuttgart, Susanne Fröhlich, Rico Gübler, Michael Schmid, George-Elie Octors. 2013 Sub Rosa Record, CYP4502
- Semplice, Miranda Cuckson. UAV-CD-5998
- Crepuscolo, Anna Petrini. 2012 db Production, dbCD143
- Grammont Sélection 4', Paolo Vignaroli. 2010 MGB, CTS-M 130

== Collaborations ==
- Oscar Bianchi has written for and collaborated with artists such as Pablo Heras-Casado, Sabine Meyer, Jack Quartet, Quatuor Diotima, David Grimal, Franck Ollu, Joel Pommerat, Constanza Macras Stefan Asbury, Pascal Rophé, Enno Poppe, Miranda Cuckson, Baldur Brönnimann, Brad Lubman.
- with orchestras such as the Gewandhaus Orchestra, Orchestre Philharmonique de Radio France, Deutsche Symphonie Orchester, Klangforum Wien, Ensemble Modern, Ictus, Uusinta Ensemble, Neuevocalsolisten Stuttgart, Remix Ensemble, Alarm Will Sound, International Contemporary Ensemble, Les Percussions de Strasbourg, Nieuw Ensemble, Ensemble l’Itinéraire, Ensemble Contrechamps, Kammerensemble für neue Musik Berlin, Phoenix Ensemble, Collegium Novum Zürich, Drumming Grupo de Percussão from Porto, Ensemble Laboratorium, Österreichisches Ensemble für neue Musik, Sound’arte Eklekto, San Francisco Contemporary Music Players.
- Oscar Bianchi has taught composition at Columbia University, at the Royaumont Abbey and at the Luzern Musikhochschule
