= NeuverBand Ensemble für Neue Musik =

Chamber music group in Basel, Switzerland

neuverBand Ensemble für Neue Musik is a 10-member chamber ensemble based in Basel, Switzerland and dedicated to the performance of contemporary music. The ensemble was founded in 2012 by then students in the New Music Performance Master's programme at the Basel Hochschule für Musik. Since its creation, the group has commissioned works from dozens of emerging composers, including Yu Kuwabara, Nicolas von Ritter-Zahony, Michele Sanna, Stefan Keller, Bryan Jacobs, Alireza Farhang, William Dougherty, Arturo Corrales, Ashkan Behzadi and Benjamin Attahir, and has presented the Swiss premieres of works by composers such as Salvatore Sciarrino, Franck Bedrossian, Julián Carrillo, Stefano Gervasoni, Gérard Pesson, Klaus Lang, Fabien Lévy, Philippe Leroux, Martin Matalon, Misato Mochizuki, Per Nørgård, Uroš Rojko, Rebecca Saunders and Simon Steen-Andersen.

The ensemble regularly appears at new music festivals in Switzerland, such as Archipel (Geneva), Musikfest Bern, Zeiträume (Basel) and SMC Lausanne, as well as international events such as Koper Biennale (Slovenia), Sound Plasma (Berlin) and ReMusik (Saint Petersburg).
