= Barlinnie Nine =

Orchestral composition

Barlinnie Nine is a single-movement orchestral composition by the Finnish composer Osmo Tapio Räihälä. The work was premiered by the Finnish Radio Symphony Orchestra under the conductor Sakari Oramo on 20 April 2005 at Finlandia Hall.

== Composition ==
Barlinnie Nine has a duration of roughly 11 and half minutes and is composed in one continuous movement. The work has a subtitle A Tribute to Duncan Ferguson. Räihälä has described the work as a symphonic poem, and as a "musical portrait" of the Scottish footballer Duncan Ferguson.

I got the idea for it when he was facing jail and had just become something of a cult figure for Everton. It takes into account the contradictions in him: he has an aggressive side but there is a lyrical undertone to him, as the fact that he keeps pigeons shows. When I started composing seriously about 20 years ago, I realised that people take inspiration from all kinds of sources and I just let Everton play a part in my compositions. More than anything, though, Duncan has been one of the great underachievers of his generation.

=== Instrumentation ===
The work is scored for three flutes (doubling piccolo and tin whistles), three oboes (doubling cor anglais), three clarinets (doubling bass clarinet), three bassoons (doubling contrabassoon), four French horns, three trumpets, three trombones, tuba, timpani, two percussionists, harp, and strings.

=== The title ===
According to Räihälä, the title refers to HMP Barlinnie, where Ferguson served his prison sentence in 1995, and to Ferguson's shirt number in Everton.

== The Ferguson goal co-incidence ==
In the same evening when Barlinnie Nine was premiered in Helsinki, Duncan Ferguson returned to the Everton side, that was chasing a spot in the Champions League, for a game versus Manchester United. Ferguson had been out of the side for most of the season, but headed the only goal of the game, giving Everton their first win over Manchester United for ten years. As it happens, the previous victory was also at Goodison Park, and even then Ferguson was the scorer of the only goal of the game, a header at the same end of the pitch. However, at this time Räihälä, a lifelong Everton supporter, had stopped following football, and was unaware of the game. After having learned about this co-incidence, Räihälä stated:

It was like an alcoholic hitting the bottle again. There I was describing Duncan as a failure in Finland, and thousands of miles away at Everton he rises like a phoenix from the ashes to score against Manchester United. If there are gods of football up there, this proves they have got a most twisted sense of humour.

== Recording ==
The live performance of Barlinnie Nine was released on Räihälä's profile album Peat, Smoke & Seaweed Storm in 2014. The score is published by Sikorski publishing house.
