= Andrzej Kwieciński =

Polish composer

Andrzej Kwieciński (born 1984) is a Polish composer.

Kwieciński studied at composition department of Koninklijk Conservatorium in Den Haag (the Royal Conservatory in The Hague, Netherlands) in the class of Richard Ayers, Diderik Hakmy-Wagenaar, Martijn Padding, Yannis Kyriakides and Louis Andriessen.

In 2010 he was awarded the 1st prize in the composers' competition 'Young Masters XXI'. In 2012 he was nominated for the Gaudeamus Prize. In 2014, at the 61st International Rostrum of Composers his song "Canzon de 'baci" won first place in the category of composers under 30 years of age, the recommendation in the general category and a special commission from the International Music Council and Radio France.

== Sources ==
- Composer's biography at Culture.pl
- Kwiecinski's Profile at Polish Information Music Center
- Andrzej Kwiecinski wins at the International Rostrum of Composers, Culture.pl
- Composer-Andrzej-Kwiecinski-gets-Helsinki-broadcast-honour Kwiecinski Wins International Rostrum of Composers, Polish Radio External Service, Polskie Radio
