= Osmo Tapio Räihälä =

Finnish composer of contemporary music (born 1964)

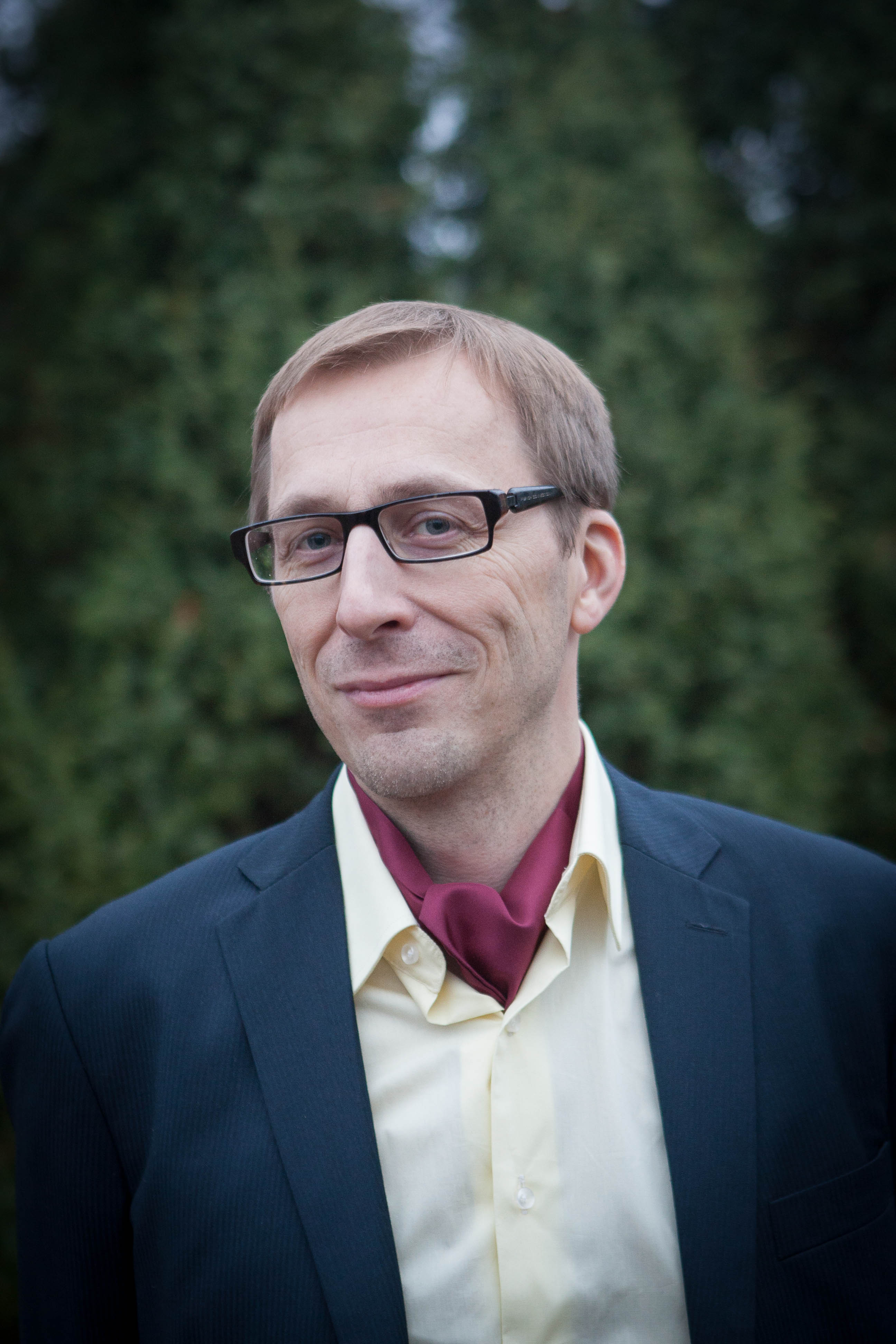
Osmo Tapio Räihälä (2013)

Osmo Tapio Everton Räihälä (Finnish pronunciation: [ˈos.mo ˈtɑ.pi.o ˈræi̯.hæ.læ]; born 15 January 1964) is a Finnish composer of contemporary music. He has written chamber music, vocal and electronic music, as well as several concertos and a few works for symphony orchestra.

== Life and career ==
Räihälä was born in Suomussalmi. He has studied under Harri Vuori. He began as a rock musician, only turning into art music in his late teens. His best-known work is the 2005 orchestral portrait Barlinnie Nine, a tribute to the Scottish football player Duncan Ferguson, then of Everton, whom Räihälä is known to be a supporter of. In 2004, another orchestral tribute, this time to the Islay single malt whisky Ardbeg, was chosen as one of recommended works in the international Uuno Klami competition. The French horn concerto received the same accolade in 2014.

Apart from the Nordic countries, Räihälä's music has been performed in the United States, United Kingdom, France, Netherlands, Germany, Russia and many other countries. The first CD recording of his works, Rock Painting, was released in 2006, and the following, Peat, Smoke & Seaweed Storm in 2014. As of 2015, Räihälä's music is represented by the German publisher Sikorski Musikverlage. In 1998 he started the Uusinta Ensemble, a group focusing on contemporary art music.

Räihälä is also known as a writer of music in Finland. His first book Miksi nykymusiikki on niin vaikeaa [Why Is Contemporary Music So Difficult] won the prestigious Finlandia Prize book award in nonfiction category in 2021.

== Personal life ==
Räihälä stated in an interview with Sikorski magazine that he has synesthesia.

== Discography ==
- Saatana saapuu Turkuun (KACD2001-2, 1999)
- Chadwick Drive (FFCD1025, 1999)
- Damballa (UUCD101, 2004)
- Rock Painting (UUCD103, 2006)
- Peat, Smoke & Seaweed Storm (ABCD367, 2014)
- L'homme à la licorne (OPTCD-15013, 2015)
- Kirkasvetinen (AVI8553408, 2018)
- Kalliokirskuja (WREC1, 2020)
- Zensolence (0022030KAI, 2024)
- Extinction (UVU229, 2026)
