= Just Go (JHETT song) =

2005 single by Jhett

Single by JHETT featuring Koda Kumi

from the album JHETT, Jhett Black Edition, Out Works & Collaboration Best
- B-side: Leave It To Fate ~ubiquitous~; Just Go (COLDFEET Remix)
- Released: March 9, 2005
- Genre: R&B
- Label: Avex; CD (CTCR-40203)
- Songwriters: JHETT, Koda Kumi, Lori Fine
- Producer: JHETT

JHETT singles chronology
"Get Ready -Nite 2 Remember-" (2005)	"Just Go" (2005)

Koda Kumi singles chronology
"hands" (2005)	"Just Go" (2005)	"Hot Stuff" (2005)

Just Go is the second single released by Japanese DJ and music producer JHETT a.k.a. YAKKO for AQUARIUS, and featured singer-songwriter Koda Kumi. The single was released on March 9, 2005 and only available as a CD.

JHETT was part of the underground hip-hop unit AQUARIUS.

== Information ==
Just Go feat. Koda Kumi is the second single released by Japanese DJ and music producer JHETT a.k.a. YAKKO for AQUARIUS on March 9, 2005, and featured singer-songwriter Koda Kumi. The single was only released as a CD, which contained four songs, including a remix of the title track, along with its instrumental.

JHETT had worked predominantly in the underground hip hop scene, mainly with the group AQUARIUS. While having only released two singles, Just Go and the previous single Get Ready -Nite 2 Remember-, JHETT would go on to release three albums under the Avex label: JHETT, My Hood Iz... and Jhett Black Edition, all of which were released throughout 2005.

The single contained two coupling tracks. It held the COLDFEET remix of "Just Go" and the song "Leave It To Fate ~ubiquitous~", which featured sample vocals from American funk and soul artist Roy Ayers. Along with the two b-sides, the single also held the instrumental for the title track.

"Just Go" would be placed on the first disc of the album JHETT. The COLDFEET remix and the music video would be placed on the album Jhett Black Edition.

In 2010, Koda Kumi would release the song on her fourth compilation album, Out Works & Collaboration Best as track No. 6.

== Background and composition ==
"Just Go" was written and composed by both JHETT and Lori Fine. The lyrical portion, however, was a collaborative effort between Fine and the featured artist, Koda Kumi. The song would be placed on JHETT's self-titled album. JHETT and Fine also composed the coupling track "Leave It To Fate ~ubiquitous~", while sampling vocals from funk and soul artist Roy Ayers.

The remix of "Just Go" was performed by COLDFEET, and mixed by Yoshiaki Onishi. The remix would be placed on JHETT's third album, JHETT Black Edition (stylized as JHETT BLACK EDITION). "Leave It To Fate" would also receive a remix on the album. The version would omit Roy Ayers and replace the vocals with Lori Fine's.

== Track listing ==
CD
No.	Title	Lyrics	Music	Length
1.	"Just Go feat. Koda Kumi"	Koda Kumi • Lori Fine	JHETT • Lori Fine	4:30
2.	"Leave It To Fate ~ubiquitous~ feat. Roy Ayers"		JHETT • Lori Fine • Watusi (Bass) • Roy Ayers (Vibraphone)	4:06
3.	"Just Go feat. Koda Kumi" (COLDFEET Remix)	Koda Kumi • Lori Fine	Yoshiaki Onishi • Watusi	6:05
4.	"Just Go" (Instrumental)		JHETT • Lori Fine	4:28

== Personnel ==
Credits are adapted from single's Liner Notes

Musicians

- Koda Kumi – vocals, lyricist (track 1, 3)
- Lori Fine – background vocal arrangement (track 1), lyricist, keyboards (track 2)
- JHETT – arranger, composer
- D.O.I – mixer, programmer (track 1, 2)
- Roy Ayers – vibraphone (track 2)
- Watusi – bass (track 2), instrumental (track 3)
- MATSUMONICA – chromatic harmonica (track 2)
- Yoshiaki Onishi – mixer (track 3)
- Mitsuyasu Kaneko at GAILLO PORTA – recorder (track 1)
- Tomohiro Murata at Daimonion Recordings – recorder (track 2)
- Tim Donovan at Jammin' Downtown Studio – recorder (track 2)

Production

- JHETT – executive producer, programmer
- KRIMINAL DESIGN – art direction, design
- JFKK for H.Y.D.P. – photographer
