= Agata Zubel =

Polish composer and singer (born 1978)

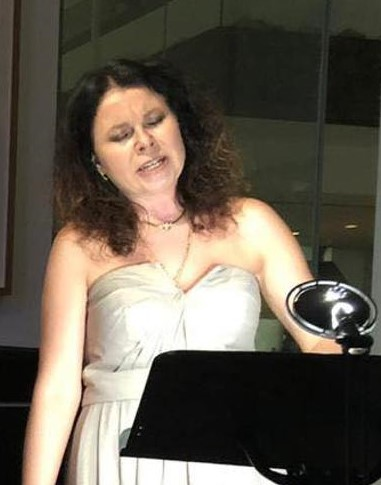
Agata Zubel

Agata Zubel (born 1978 in Wrocław, Poland) is a Polish composer and singer.

== Life ==
Zubel is a graduate of Wrocław's Karol Szymanowski High School of Music (percussion and music theory) and the Karol Lipiński University of Music, where she studied composition with Jan Wichrowski. She is a member of the Youth Circle of the Polish Composers' Union and a recipient of the Ministry of Culture and National Heritage scholarship. Currently she teaches at the Academy of Music in Wrocław (full professor). In 2013 she was honoured by the International Music Council’s International Rostrum of Composers with the best composition title for Not I, which she wrote for soprano, instrumental ensemble and electronics.

In October 2017 she was awarded the Bronze Medal "Gloria Artis". She is an ordinary member of the Polish Composers' Union.

== Selected works ==
- Lumiere pour percussion (1997)
- Nocturne for solo violin (1997)
- Three Miniatures for piano (1998)
- Birthday for mixed a cappella choir; text by Wisława Szymborska (1998)
- A Song about the End of the World for voice, reciter and instrumental ensemble; text by Czesław Miłosz (1998)
- Meditations for mixed a cappella choir; text by Jan Twardowski (1999)
- Ragnatela for bassoon and string orchestra (1999)
- Ludia and Fu for solo guitar (1999)
- Ballad for voice, percussion and tape (1999)
- Photographs from an Album for Marimba and String Quartet (2000)
- Trivellazione a percussione for percussion (2000)
- Re-Cycle for five percussionists (2001)
- Lentille for string orchestra, voice and accordion (2001)
- Symphony No. 1 for orchestra (2002)
- Nelumbo for four marimbas (2003)
- Unisono I for voice, percussion and computer (2003)
- Unisono II for voice, accordion and computer (2003)
- Concerto grosso for recorder, baroque violin, harpsichord and two choirs (2004)
- Stories for voice and prepared piano (2004)
- Symphony No. 2 for 77 performers (2005)
- String Quartet No. 1 for four cellos and computer (2006)
- Maximum Load for percussion and computer (2006)
- Cascando for voice, flute, clarinet, violin and cello (2007)
- nad Pieśniami (of Songs) for soprano (mezzosoprano), cello, mixed choir and orchestra (2007)
- Between – opera/ballet for voice, electronics and dancers (2008)
- Not I for voice, ensemble and electronics; text by Samuel Beckett (2010)
- Symphony No. 3 for a double Bell trumpet and symphony orchestra (2010)
- Aphorisms on Miłosz, for soprano and ensemble (2011)
- Violin Concerto (2014)
- where to for soprano and chamber ensemble (2015)
- Double Battery for instrumental ensemble (2016)
- Bildbeschreibung, opera form for two voices, instrumental ensemble and electronics; text by Heiner Müller (2016)
- Cleopatra's Song for voice and ensemble; text by William Shakespeare (2017)
- Fireworks for large symphony orchestra (2018)
- Chamber Piano Concerto (2018)
- 3x3 for ensemble (2019)
- Triptyque for ensemble (2020)
- Memory of Bronze for carillon (2021)
- Outside the Realm of Time for hologram-soloist and orchestra (2022)
