= Lefteris Papadimitriou =

Greek composer and performer

Lefteris Papadimitriou is a Greek composer and performer.

== Biography ==
He was born in Volos, Greece. He studied composition with Iannis Ioannidis and has written many compositions for live instruments and electronic media.

He is a graduate of the Department of Musicology of the University of Athens.

He plays live electronic music with a laptop as his instrument. A live work, entitled “Jollywood”, was based entirely on MIDI sounds.

He is interested in applying electronic techniques to acoustic music and in the exploration of acoustic musical expressiveness in the medium of electronic music.

In 2006, he won the Gaudeamus International Composers Award with his work for piano and orchestra, titled “Black and White”.

He is currently studying for a PhD in composition at the University of Huddersfield with the support of a scholarship from the Huddersfield contemporary music festival and the Centre of Research in New Music.
