= Fabien Lévy =

French composer (born 1968)

- Born: Fabien Lévy; 1968 (age 57–58); Paris, France
- Occupation: Composer
- Website: www.fabienlevy.net

Fabien Lévy (born 11 December 1968) is a French composer.

== Biography ==
Lévy was born in Paris, France. After having been a jazz pianist, he studied composition with Gérard Grisey, orchestration with Marc–André Dalbavie and ethnomusicology with Gilles Leothaud at the Conservatoire de Paris from 1996 to 2000. Trained in mathematics and mathematical economics (Master from ENSAE and ENS Ulm Delta, adjunct in mathematics from 1989 to 1992 and researcher from 1992 to 1994), he definitively quit science for music in 1994. In 2001, he went to Berlin on the DAAD Artist program, and in 2002 to the Villa Medici / Academy of France in Rome. In 2004, he shared the Ernst von Siemens Composer Prize in composition with Johannes Maria Staud and Enno Poppe. A former pedagogical advisor at IRCAM in Paris and professor of orchestration at the Hanns Eisler Music Conservatory in Berlin, he was 2006–2012 assistant professor in composition at Columbia University in New York, was 2012–2017 senior professor for composition at the Hochschule für Musik Detmold in Germany, and since October 2017 has been senior professor for composition at the Hochschule für Musik und Theater 'Felix Mendelssohn-Bartholdy' Leipzig. He has held numerous composition seminars and lectures in Europe (including Berlin, Como, Royaumont, Darmstadt, Tchaikovsky city, and Paris) and the US (including at Harvard University, Carnegie Mellon, Northwestern University, Manhattan School of Music, and Cornell University).

His instrumental works, influenced by the spectral school, some acoustic illusions and techniques from various non-Western cultures, mainly focus on paradoxes of perception and musical grammatology, and on techniques of "cross-rhythms" generalized to every musical parameter and "instrumental pointillism", and on deconstructing major concepts of the Western music. While using new technologies, he has also developed some "meta-works" (such as Soliloque sur [x, x,...]).

== Catalog ==
- Jusqu'à peu, for organ four hands (2022, Peters ed.)
- Avant-demain, for six car horns (2020, Peters ed.)
- De l'art d'induire en erreur, for three amplified voices and orchestra (2019, Peters ed.)
- Chroniques déchantées, for Accordion and piano (2019, Peters ed.)
- Murmelt mein Blut, for Soprano and piano (2018, Peters ed.)
- Quand Friselda et son voisin, erotic Canon for 6 voices (2017, Ricordi ed.)
- Nun hab' ich nichts mehr, for soprano, accordion, electric guitar and piano (2016, Ricordi ed.)
- Als Gregor und Griselda, erotic canon for six voices (2015, Ricordi ed.)
- à tue-tête for nine in space wind instruments (2014, Ricordi ed.)
- Towards the door we never opened, for saxophone quartet (2013, Ricordi ed.)
- Danse polyptote, for cello and accordion (2013, Ricordi ed.)
- Après tout, for six singers, flute, saxophone, accordion, electric guitar, percussion and cello (2012, Ricordi ed.)
- A peu près de, for two trumpets (2010, Ricordi ed.)
- A propos, for flute, clarinet, piano, violin & cello (2008, Ricordi ed.)
- Pour orchestre, for big orchestra (2008, Billaudot ed.)
- Lexèmes hirsutes, for cello solo (2007, Billaudot ed.)
- Querwüchsig, for ensemble (2007, Billaudot ed.)
- Tre volti del volubile Ares, for wind symphonic orchestra (2006, Billaudot ed.)
- Les murmures d'une orchidée solitaire, for two Guqin, Chinese flutes, hammond organ, harp, violin & cello (2004, Billaudot ed.)
- Risâla fî-l-hob wa fî'lm al-handasa, ["Small treatise of love and geometry"] for flute, clarinet, euphonium or tenor saxophone, violin & cello (2003, Billaudot ed.)
- Soliloque sur [X, X, X et X], commentaries from a computer about a misunderstood concert (2002) (webpage for the metawork Soliloque)
- Hérédo-ribotes, for solo viola and 51 orchestra musicians (2001)
- Où niche l'hibou ?, small pedagogical pieces for a young student and his teacher (for two saxophones or two flutes or two clarinets) (1999, Billaudot ed.)
- Coïncidences, for ensemble of 33 musicians (1999, Billaudot ed.)
- Durch, in memoriam G. Grisey, for saxophone quartet (1998, Billaudot ed.)
- L'air d'ailleurs-Bicinium, for alto saxophone and tape (1997, Billaudot ed.)
- Dr.B., for baritone and bassoon. Musical theater, inspired by "die Schachnovelle" by Stefan Zweig (1996, Billaudot ed.)
- Les deux ampoules d'un sablier peu à peu se comprennent, for solo amplified harp (1996, Billaudot ed.)

== Former students ==
- Victor Adan
- Hed Bahack
- Rui Pedro Cardoso Antunes
- Mahir Cetiz
- Guillermo Cobo
- Paul Clift
- Zosha di Castri
- Mario Diaz di Leon
- Michele Foresi
- Evan Gardner
- Amit Gilutz
- Pablo Andoni Gómez Olabarría
- Sampo Haapamäki
- Max Hundelshausen
- Bryan Jacobs
- Brahim Kerkour
- Andile Khumalo
- Steve Lehman
- Dariya Maminova
- Ehsan Mohagheghi-Fard
- Yoshiaki Onishi
- Kate Soper
- Eric Wubbels

== References and external links ==
- "Fabien Lévy" (biography, works, resources) (in French and English). IRCAM.
- Wikipedia website in French
- Publisher's website: Ricordi Berlin
- Publisher's website: Billaudot
- Columbia University Website
- Personal website of the composer
