= Helsinki Chamber Choir =

Finnish mixed choir

The Helsinki Chamber Choir (Finnish: Helsingin kamarikuoro) is a Helsinki-based professional chamber choir that specializes in performing contemporary music and new commissions. It was founded in 2005 by the singers of the Finnish Radio Chamber Choir to continue its work after its funding was cut. The choir has been directed by Nils Schweckendiek since 2007.

In February 2024 the choir, together with Uusinta Ensemble, won the Grammy for Best Choral Performance with its recording Reconnaissance, containing the eponymous work and other choral works by Kaija Saariaho. The recording also won the Emma award of the Finnish music production industry in the same year.
