= Uusinta Ensemble =

Finnish chamber ensemble

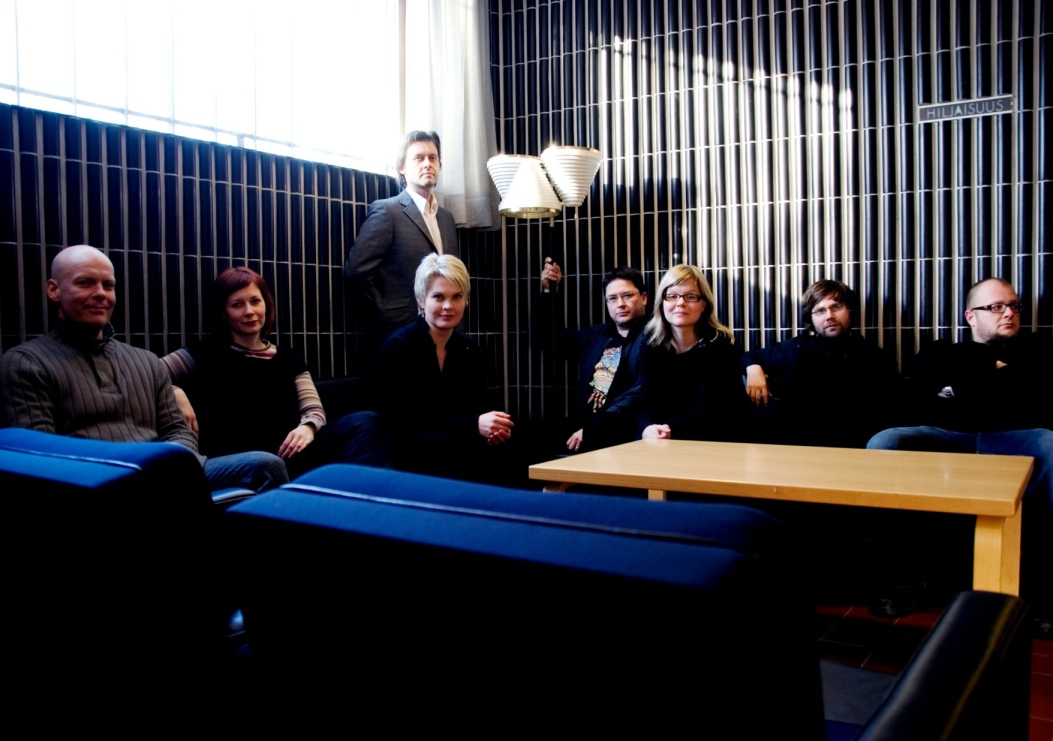
Uusinta Chamber Ensemble in 2009

Uusinta Ensemble is a Grammy-winning Finnish chamber ensemble, focusing on contemporary music. Until 2013, the ensemble was known as "Uusinta Chamber Ensemble", or "Uusinta-kamariyhtye" in Finnish.

Uusinta Ensemble was started in 1998 by the composer Osmo Tapio Räihälä, and in the early years most of its members were composers, such as Max Savikangas, Riikka Talvitie, Kimmo Leppälä and Lauri Toivio. The ensemble has premiered a vast number of Finnish and Nordic composers' music. In recent years, Uusinta's repertoire has widened internationally, much as a result of the ensemble's co-operation with various organizations and festivals. Apart from its native Finland, Uusinta has performed in France, Spain, Denmark, Norway, Sweden, Germany, Austria, Estonia and the United States. Uusinta has premiered over one hundred works by composers of various nationalities. Uusinta's American debut in New York in April 2014 received very good reviews. Uusinta Ensemble released its first album, at the edge of time, in 2004.

The ensemble's current members belong to the most prominent Finnish musicians born in the 1970s and the 1980s. Inside the ensemble, there is an established string quartet, Uusinta String Quartet, which comprises the violinists Maria Puusaari and Aleksi Kotila, the violist Max Savikangas, and the cellist Pinja Nuñez. As of 2023, the artistic director of the Uusinta Ensemble is the composer Jarkko Hartikainen.

Uusinta Ensemble has co-performed with among others the Helsinki Chamber Choir, the French Ensemble Aleph, the German ensemble adapter and the Spanish Ensemble Espai Sonor.

During the season 2009–2010, Uusinta Ensemble was part of the EU funded re:new project, which promoted European contemporary music in 11 countries. In 2009, Uusinta Ensemble celebrated its tenth season. The contemporary music concert series Klang, which started in Helsinki in 2011, was launched by the initiative of the Uusinta Ensemble members.

Besides the ensemble, Uusinta also started the publishing house Uusinta Publishing Company Ltd. in 2000, but the two now work separately.

== Awards ==
Together with the Helsinki Chamber Choir and the conductor Nils Schweckendiek, Uusinta won in 2024 both the ICMA prize and the Grammy award for "Best Choral Performance" for the album Reconnaissance, performing music of Kaija Saariaho. The same album won also the Finnish Emma Award for the best classical album of 2023.

== Discography ==
- Max Savikangas: Extraterrestrial 2003, 2CD
- At the Edge of Time 2004
- Osmo Tapio Räihälä: Rock Painting 2006
- Being Beauteous with Anu Komsi 2011
- Suså 3 2011
- Veli Kujala: Hyperorganism 2016
- Beat Furrer: Works for Choir and Ensemble 2016
- Sebastian Hilli: confluence / divergence 2020
- Kaija Saariaho: Reconnaissance 2023
- Osmo Tapio Räihälä: Zensolence 2024
- Mioko Yokoyama: Mineralization 2026
