= Kumiko Omura =

Japanese composer

- Born: 25 June 1970 (age 55); Shizuoka Prefecture, Japan
- Other name: 大村 久美子
- Occupation: composer

Kumiko Omura (大村 久美子, Ōmura Kumiko; born 25 June 1970 in Shizuoka Prefecture) is a Japanese composer in the field of contemporary instrumental and electronic music.

== Career ==
Omura studied with Isao Matsushita, Kenjirō Urata and Jo Kondo at the Tokyo University of the Arts. She then took music composition with Prof. Nicolaus A. Huber and electronic music with Ludger Brümmer and Dirk Reith at the Folkwang University of the Arts in Essen, Germany. She further studied electronic music at IRCAM in Paris, and Intermedia Art (master's degree) with Kiyoshi Furukawa in Tokyo. Her music has been performed in Japan, Korea, USA, and Europe (Wittener Tage für neue Kammermusik, musica viva in Munich, Festival AGORA, Festival Acanthe in France, Gaudeamus Music Week in the Netherlands, Emufest in Italy, Bludenzer Tage zeitgemäßer Musik in Austria and Music from Japan in New York) by such orchestras and ensembles as the New Japan Philharmonic, Ensemble Modern, musikFabrik, Ensemble recherche, Ensemble resonanz and Nieuw Ensemble. Between 2006 and 2010, she was a guest artist at ZKM Center for Art and Media Karlsruhe in Karlsruhe, Germany, and from 2010–2011 she was a composer-in-residence at Künstlerhof Schreyahn.

== Recognition ==
- 1994: Irino Prize in Japan
- 1998: Gaudeamus International Composers Award in the Netherlands
- 1999: Prize by Biennale Neue Musik Hannover
- 2000: Förderpreis des Landes Nordrhein-Westfalen für junge Künstlerinnen und Künstler
- 2000: ACL Yoshiro IRINO Memorial Prize by Asian Music Festival
- 2004: Takefu Composition Award in Japan
- 2005: Composition Prize for young composer by Japan Society for Contemporary Music
- 2012: Supporting prize by Giga-Hertz-Preis by ZKM (Zentrum für Kunst und Medientechnologie) and Experimentalstudio des SWR

== Discography ==
- Double Contour / Kumiko Omura Portrait CD by fontec "Japanese Composer" series (2009)
- Double Contour for cello and live electronics (2001)
- Germination II 6 Players (Fl.Ob.Cl.Vn.Pf.Vib.) (2003)
- Hommage à Pluton ensemble and live electronics (2006–07)
- Mutation of the Möbius recorder and viola d'amore (2005)
- La complication d'image AB for alto/baritone saxophone (2002/7)
- Reticulation for Orchestra (1993–94)
- Imaginary Bridge for shakuhachi, ensemble and electronic sound (1998–99)
- Double Contour for cello and live electronics (2001) / Computer music journal sound and video anthology, vol. 28, (2004)
- La complicatiln d'image for tenor saxophone and live electronic (2002) / Takashi Saito (Sax) Solo CD by ALM Record in Japan (2003)
- Synapse for strings ensemble (2001–02) / Wittener Tage für neue Kammermusik 2002 bem WDR
