= Zou Hang =

Chinese Composer (born 1975)

Nándor Zsolt
- Born: 1975 (age 50–51)
- Occupation: Composer

Academic background
- Education: Central Conservatory of Music

Academic work
- Discipline: Music
- Institutions: Central Conservatory of Music

Zou Hang (Chinese: 左航; born 1975) is a Chinese composer born in Hunan province. He studied traditional music at an early age from his father, Professor Zou Shuliang. He began to study composition in 1990, and was admitted to the Central Conservatory of Music, where he studied under the composer Ye Xiaogang. In 2001, he obtained his master's degree and became a faculty member of the conservatory.

== Awards ==
- Gaudeamus International Composers Award (1997)
- The Best Music for dance drama music of the 5th National Water Lily Prize Dancing Competition of China (2005)
- Golden Bell Award of Chinese music (as composer and lyricist) (2001)
- The Gold prize of the 9th Guangdong Art Festival (2005)
- Excellent Works award in the 6th Music Contribution Competition of Taiwan Symphony Orchestra (1997)

== Works ==
- 2011 (for Children Choir and Orchestra) and The Color of Beijing (for Orchestra) premiered in Beijing Modern Festival
- Distance of Jazz] (for Piano Solo) performed in Northern Sea Jazz Festival
- Ai, Ai? Ai! Ai. (for Piano Trio) excerpt "Nine Horses-New music from China"
- Eighteen Arhats (for Chamber Orchestra) and E-Time (for Large Ensemble) were premiered in Gaudeamus Music Week
- Flying Kite (for Mix Ensemble) commissioned by Silk Road Plan of YoYo Ma
- Nanjing 1937 (for Dance Drama) won The Best Music of the 5th National Water Lily Prize Dancing Competition of China;
- Miss XIU (The Embroidery Girl) (for Dance Drama) performed in John F. Kennedy Arts Center
- Fo Tiao Qiang (Buddha Jumps Over the Wall)(for Chinese Traditional Folk Symphony Orchestra)
- Shi Bian Wu Hua (Ten Changes and Five Variables) (for String Quartet and Chinese Instrument Chamber Orchestra) premiered in New Zealand Festival
- Tipsy Dancing Devarajas(for Large Ensemble) performed in USA, Russia, Austria and Many countries

== Other ==
In 2007, he has served music director for the Opening Ceremony of the 9th National Traditional Games of Ethnic Minorities of China, this has also the youngest music director of the large game's Opening Ceremony. In 2011, he has served music director for the Cui Jian’s rock Symphony Concert.
