= ICTUS =

Belgian orchestra

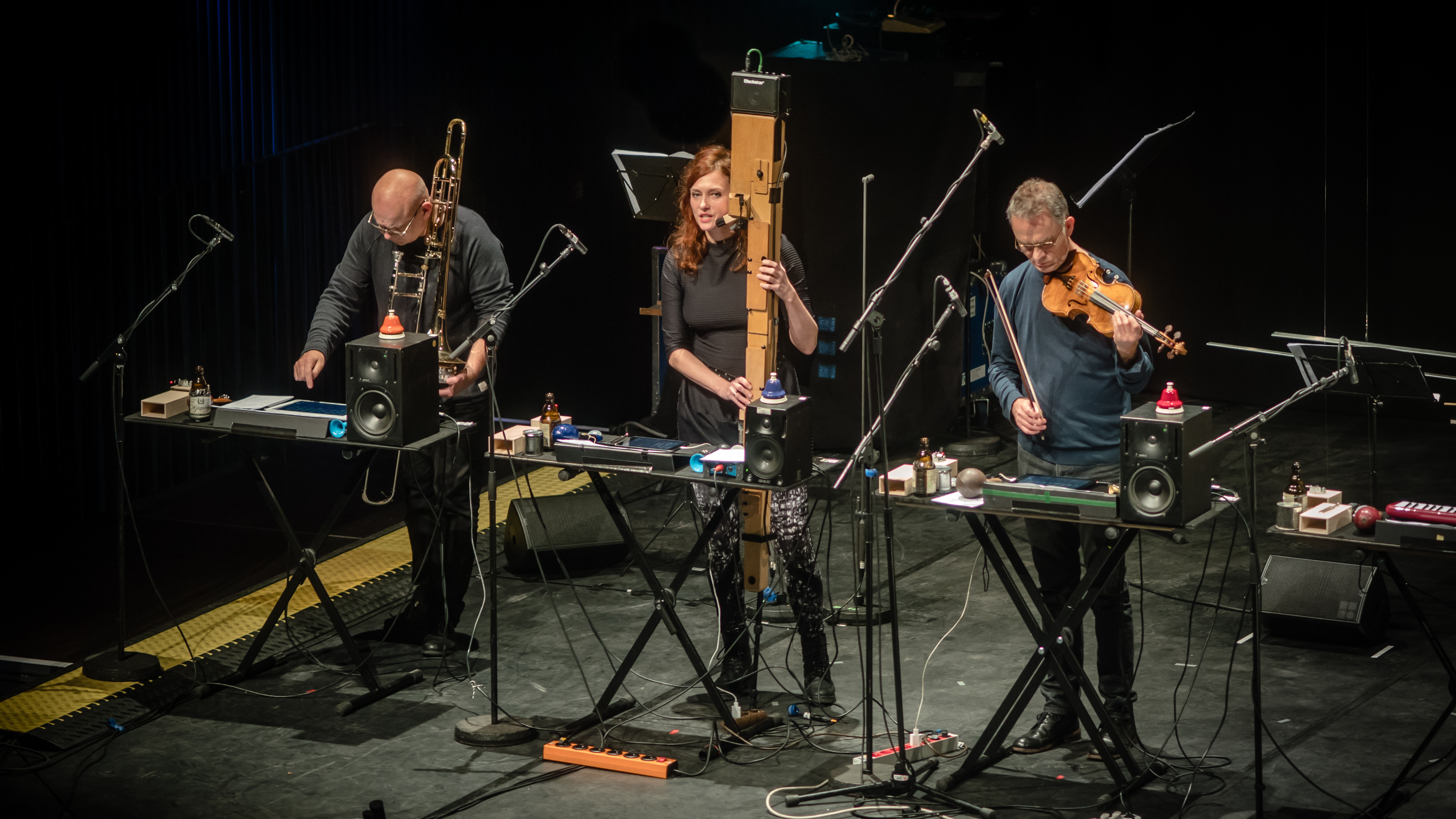
Ictus Ensemble

ICTUS is a Belgian orchestra, founded by Jean-Luc Plouvier in 1994, specialising in contemporary classical music. It is based in Brussels where it is involved in frequent collaborations with the contemporary dance choreographer Anne Teresa De Keersmaeker.

The orchestra specialises in music written since 1950 with an emphasis on contemporary compositions.

== Selected recordings ==
- Oscar Bianchi: Matra, Cyprès, CYP4502
- Fausto Romitelli / Paolo Pachini: An Index of Metals, Cyprès, CYP5622
- Georges Aperghis / Peter Szendy: Avis de Tempête, Cyprès, CYP5621
- Fausto Romitelli: Professor Bad Trip, Cyprès, CYP5620
- Steve Reich: Drumming, Cyprès, CYP5608
- Terry Riley: In C, Cyprès 5601
- Jonathan Harvey: Wheel of Emptiness, Cyprès, CYP5604
- Georges Aperghis: Die Hamletmaschine – Oratorio, Cyprès, CYP5607
- Jean-Luc Fafchamps: Melencholia si..., Sub Rosa, Unclassical, SR179
- Benoît Mernier: Les Idées Heureuses, Cyprès, CYP4613
