= Thanks to My Eyes =

Opera by Oscar Bianchi

Thanks To My Eyes is the first opera by the Italian Swiss composer Oscar Bianchi. It was premiered at the Festival d'Aix-en-Provence in 2011 and received its Belgian premiere at the La Monnaie in Brussels in March 2012. The same year further performances took place in Europe. The libretto by Joël Pommerat is based on his former play Grace a mes Yeux.

== Roles ==
Role	Voice type	Premiere cast, Aix-en-Provence July 2011 Conductor: Frank Ollu
Aymar	Countertenor	Hagen Matzeit
The Father	bass-baritone	Brian Bannatyne-Scott
The Mother	comedian	Anne Rotger
A Young Woman in the Night	soprano	Keren Motseri
A Young Blonde Woman	soprano	Fflur Wyn
A man with long hair	mime	Antoine Rigot

== Instrumentation ==
Flute (C Flute, bass Flute and Piccolo), Recorder (sopranino Recorder, soprano Recorder, tenor Recorder, bass Recorder and Paetzold contrabass Recorder in F), Clarinet (Clarinet in Bb, bass Clarinet in Bb and contrabass Clarinet in Bb), Saxophone (soprano Saxophone, alto Saxophone and Eb Tubax), Trumpet in C (doubling Flugelhorn), Trombone, Percussion, Accordion, Violin, Viola, Violoncello, Contrabass, Electronics.
