= Rock Painting =

Rock Painting (Värikallio)

Studio album by Osmo Tapio Räihälä
- Released: 2006
- Genre: Art music, Chamber music, Contemporary music
- Length: 59:31
- Label: Uusinta
- Producer: Osmo Tapio Räihälä

Osmo Tapio Räihälä chronology
| Rock Painting (Värikallio) (2006) | Peat, Smoke & Seaweed Storm (2014) |

Rock Painting (Finnish title Värikallio) was the first album of the Finnish composer Osmo Tapio Räihälä, released in 2006. The music on the album is performed by the Uusinta Chamber Ensemble. The album consists of seven works, written between 1997 and 2004.

== Track listing ==
| No. | Title | Length |
|---|---|---|
| 1. | "Rampant" | 6:18 |
| 2. | "Damballa" | 7:43 |
| 3. | "String Quartet nr. 2 (Jobimao)" | 9:24 |
| 4. | "King of Lycksele (Lyckselen kuningas)" | 3:54 |
| 5. | "Stoa Trilogy (I Ataraxy 4:16 - II Apathy 2:42 - III Autarchy 3:51)" | 10:49 |
| 6. | "Emperor of Vuokki (Vuokin keisari)" | 3:58 |
| 7. | "Rock Painting (Värikallio)" | 17:20 |

== Personnel ==
- Osmo Tapio Räihälä – composer, producer (all tracks)
- Eva Ollikainen – conductor (7)
- Lauri Toivio – flute (2, 7)
- Riikka Talvitie – oboe (2)
- Anni Haapaniemi – oboe (7)
- Kimmo Leppälä – clarinet (2)
- Marko Portin – clarinet (7)
- Janne Pulkkinen – bassoon (7)
- Reeta Rossi – French horn (7)
- Emil Holmström – piano (5, 7)
- Reeta Maalismaa – violin (1, 3)
- Maria Puusaari – violin (1-3, 5-7)
- Mirka Malmi – violin (7)
- Max Savikangas – viola (3, 7)
- Markus Hohti – violoncello (3-4, 7)
- Henrika Fagerlund – double bass (7)

== Notes ==
The solos on the track Rock Painting are improvised by Lauri Toivio (flute), Max Savikangas (viola) and Marko Portin (clarinet).
