= Geoff Hannan =

British composer and musician

Geoff Hannan (born 1972 in London, England) is a British composer and musician born to Irish parents.

== Education ==
Hanan studied composition privately with Michael Finnissy from 1987 to 1990 before reading Music at the University of Manchester. In 2006 he was awarded a PhD from Royal Holloway, University of London, where, with financial assistance from the Arts and Humanities Research Council, he studied composition with film composer Brian Lock. He has attended a number of composition classes in mainland Europe with composers such as Harrison Birtwistle and Helmut Lachenmann, and participated in Brian Ferneyhough's composition course at Royaumont Abbey (Fondation Royaumont) in 1994 and 1995.

In 1998 he was joint winner of the Gaudeamus International Composers Award; in 2007 he was the recipient of the 5th Marenco International Composition Prize. In 2019 he received an Ivor Novello Composer Award for Pocket Universe.

== Career ==
In 2008, he won a scholarship to study film composition at the National Film & Television School. His teachers there included Annabelle Pangborn and Peter Howell. He has composed the music for the BAFTA-nominated Take Your Partners and the multi-award-winning Kahanikar. He has also worked as orchestrator on Permanência and Miss Christina, the recipient of a Gopo Award for best original music score.

His music has been played by, among others, Ensemble Contrechamps, Ensemble Accroche Note, Tegenwind, Isabel Ettenauer, the Nieuw Ensemble, IXION, Noszferatu, the Ives Ensemble (NL), CONTINUUM (Toronto), EXAUDI Vocal Ensemble and the London Sinfonietta. His work has been played at the London Sinfonietta's State of the Nation, the Huddersfield Contemporary Music Festival, the British Music Information Centre's 'Cutting Edge' series, and SOUNDINGS, a platform event organised by the Austrian Cultural Forum. The Ives Ensemble toured Bubblegum in 2003 and Work / Bonk in 2007.

Between 2011 and 2014, he taught composition and orchestration at the Royal Birmingham Conservatoire.

== Selected concert work ==
- Information Pack (2020)
- Communion (for four musicians) (2020)
- Rubric (2019)
- Dúlamán (2018–19)
- Twisted Biscuit (2018)
- Between Tenses (2018)
- Bone Structure (2018)
- Time is a Prison (2017)
- Pocket Universe (2016)
- Air Abacus (2016)
- The Damascene (2014)
- Four Piano Pieces for Children (2011)
- World Cinema (2001-2011)
- Work / Bonk (2006)
- Why do you think people believe in God? / Go to Hell, World! (2004)
- Where I Live is Shite / Where I Live is Posh (2002)
- Cover Versions (2002)
- Bubblegum (2001)
- Joyrider (2000)
- Centrifugal Bumblepuppy (1999)
- Rigmarole (1997)
