= Dorky Park =

German dance company

Dorky Park is a dance company from Berlin, created and directed by choreographer Constanza Macras. Initially, between 1997 and 2003, the dance troupe was called Tamagotchi Y2K.

Constanza Macras was born in Buenos Aires, where she studied dance and fashion design. After spending some time obtaining additional training at the Merce Cunningham Studio New York she moved to the city of Amsterdam, where she presented her work in various local venues. In 1995 Constanza Macras moved to Berlin and founded the group Tamagotchi Y2K which became Constanza Macras/DorkyPark in 2003

Dorky Park
Founded in:	2003
Type of performances:	Dance/Theater
Website:	http://www.dorkypark.org

== General information ==
'Constanza Macras/Dorky Park' is a dance/theater company created in 2003 emerging from the cultural mecca of Berlin. Dorky Park's productions Back to the Present (2003) "Big In Bombay" (2005), "Sure...Shall We Talk About It?" (2005), "No Wonder" (2005), Scratch/Neuköln (2004) and "Mir 3: Endurance" (2003), I'm Not the Only One"Volksbühne Berlin, Brickland (2007 ) Schaubühne Berlin, Hell On Earth (2008, Hebbel am Ufer). The company continue to tour internationally to acclaimed theaters and festivals. Categorizing Constanza Macras' work can be difficult because of the unique mix of dance, music, video, and physical humor.

== Members of Dorky Park ==
Carmen Mehnert (from the city of Lima, Peru), Diane Busuttil (Australia), Jared Gradinger (Rochester, New York, USA), Jill Emerson (from the state of Iowa, USA), Joria Camelin (Grenoble, France), Claus Erbskorn (Bebra, Germany), Knut Berger (Gelsenkirchen, Germany), Maike Möller (Mönchengladbach, Germany), Rahel Savoldelli (Germany), Yeri Anarika Vargas Sanchez (Mexico/Germany) Ana Mondini, Roni Maciel, Fernada Farah,( Brazil) Tatiana Saphir,( Argentina) and others... including special guests from each country where the group performs - like actor and choreographer Romeo Jesus Ballayan who accompanied Dorky Park in their United States tour in 2006. Hiromi Iwasa Japan ( 2005) etc.
