= Claus-Steffen Mahnkopf =

German composer, editor and author (born 1962)

Claus-Steffen Mahnkopf (born 22 October 1962) is a German composer, editor and author.

== Career ==
Claus-Steffen Mahnkopf was born in Mannheim, Germany, and studied composition with Brian Ferneyhough, Klaus Huber and Emanuel Nunes and music theory at the music academy in Freiburg where he graduated in 1992. At the same time, he studied musicology, philosophy with Jürgen Habermas and sociology at university. Later he was influenced by Habermas's antagonist Peter Sloterdijk and appropriated the idea of a philosophical explanation of the female orgasm (which lacks biological necessity in terms of procreative function) from an email novel Sloterdijk had published three years earlier.

In 1993 Mahnkopf was awarded a doctorate in philosophy for his dissertation on Arnold Schoenberg. For his compositions Mahnkopf won numerous international prizes, among them the Gaudeamus International Composers Award in 1990, the composition prize of the city Stuttgart and the Composers Award of the Ernst von Siemens Music Foundation in 1998. Mahnkopf went to Rome (Villa Massimo), Italy, Venice (Centro Tedesco di Studi Veneziani), Italy, and Basel (Paul-Sacher-Stiftung), Switzerland, on scholarships. From 2001 until 2005 Mahnkopf worked regularly at the Experimental Studio of the SWR. Since 2005 Claus-Steffen Mahnkopf has taught composition at the University of Music and Theatre "Felix Mendelssohn Bartholdy" in Leipzig. His music has been performed by many ensembles, like SurPlus or ensemble recherche at international festivals, for example at the Salzburger Festspiele or at the Flanders Festival. Among musicians who regularly perform his works are oboist Peter Veale, Sophie-Mayuko Vetter, Carin Levine, James Avery and Frank Cox.

In 1995 Mahnkopf was one of the founders of the Gesellschaft für Musik und Ästhetik (society for music and aesthetics) at Freiburg and he is also one of the editors of the society's magazine. Mahnkopf has worked as music theory teacher and as consultant for opera houses and he has published many essays in musicological magazines.

== Private life ==
In 1999, Mahnkopf married professor doctor Francesca Yardenit Albertini (1974–2011), a Jewish philosopher of religion.

== Major works ==
=== Stage works ===
- Angelus novus (1997/2000). Musical theatre after Walter Benjamin, soloists: Soprano, Flute, Piccolo, Oboe, Violoncello, Piano, Percussion (variable), written for the Munich Biennale

=== Orchestra ===
- Prospero’s Epilogue (2004) for piano and orchestra, written for Salzburger Festspiele
- humanized void (2003–2007) for large orchestra, written for Bayerischer Rundfunk

=== Chamber orchestra ===
- Chorismos (1986/1987)
- Medusa (1990–1992) for oboe/English horn and chamber orchestra
- Meta Medeian (1994), serenade for strings
- Kammersymphonie 1,2, & 3 (1993/94, 1997/99 & 2007)

=== Ensemble works ===
- »il faut continuer« Requiem for Samuel Beckett (1990–92) for chamber ensemble
- Solitude-Sérénade (1997) for piccolo oboe and ensemble
- Angela Nova (1999/2000) for soprano and ensemble
- Todesmusik [Music of Death] I & II (2001) for ensemble

=== Chamber music ===
- Krebs-Zyklus [Cancer Cycle] (1985) for violoncello and piano
- Die Schlangen der Medusa [Medusa's Snakes] (1991) for 4 clarinets
- Illuminations du brouillard (1992/1993) for oboe and piano, written for the Baden-Württemberg Ministry of Science, Research and Arts
- Mon coeur mis à nu (1986/1996/1997) for four voices (soprano, alto, tenor, bass), written for the Baden-Württemberg Ministry of Science, Research and Arts
- Trio basso for viola, cello and double bass (1995)
- resquiescant in pace (2000) in memoriam victimarum Christianitatis, for four players (violin, viola, violoncello and percussion), written for ensemble recherche
- Hommage à Frank Cox (2006) for three players (electric guitar, quarter-tone vibraphone and piano), written for ensemble asamisimasa

=== Solo works ===
- Monade (1985/1986) for oboe
- memor sum (1989) for viola
- Stheno und Euryale (1992) for harp or for harp with a second, scordated harp
- La terreur d’ange nouveau (1997–99) for flute
- deconstructing accordion (2000/2001) for accordion, written for Südwestrundfunk
- Beethoven-Kommentar (2004) for piano

=== With electronic media ===
- D.E.A.T.H (2001/2002) for eight-track tape
- W.A.S.T.E (2001/2002) for oboe and live electronics
- void – mal d’archive (2002/2003) space and sound composition, for eight-track tape

== Primary texts ==
- Mahnkopf, Claus-Steffen, Veale Peter. The Techniques of Oboe Playing. A Compendium with Additional Remarks on the Oboe D’amore and Cor Anglais. Bärenreiter, Kassel 1994.
- Since 2002 editor of the book series New Music and Aesthetics in the 21st Century. Hofheim: Wolke-Verlag in collaboration with the Gesellschaft für Musik und Ästhetik
- Editor of the study series sinefonia. Wolke-Verlag, Hofheim.
- Klein, Richard, Mahnkopf, Claus-Steffen. Mit den Ohren denken. Suhrkamp 1998.
- Mahnkopf, Claus-Steffen. Kritische Theorie der Musik. Velbrück 2006.
- Huber, Klaus, Mahnkopf, Claus-Steffen. Von Zeit zu Zeit. Wolke-Verlag, Hofheim 2009.
- Mahnkopf, Claus-Steffen. Deutschland oder Jerusalem: das kurze Leben der Francesca Albertini (Springe: Zu Klampen, 2013).

== Secondary texts ==
- Anon. 2004. "Claus-Steffen Mahnkopf". Komponisten der Gegenwart, edited by Hanns-Werner Heister, Walter-Wolfgang Sparrer. Munich: edition text + kritik.
- Fox, Christopher. 2001. "New Complexity." The New Grove Dictionary of Music and Musicians, second edition, edited by Stanley Sadie and John Tyrrell. London: Macmillan Publishers.
- Mahnkopf, Claus-Steffen. Preface to Mon Coeur mis a nu (score).
- Mahnkopf, Claus-Steffen. Preface to Second Chamber Symphony (score).
- https://arquivo.pt/wayback/20160109211113/http://www.sikorski.de/
- https://www.wolke-verlag.de
