= Anu Komsi =

Finnish operatic and concert soprano (born 1967)

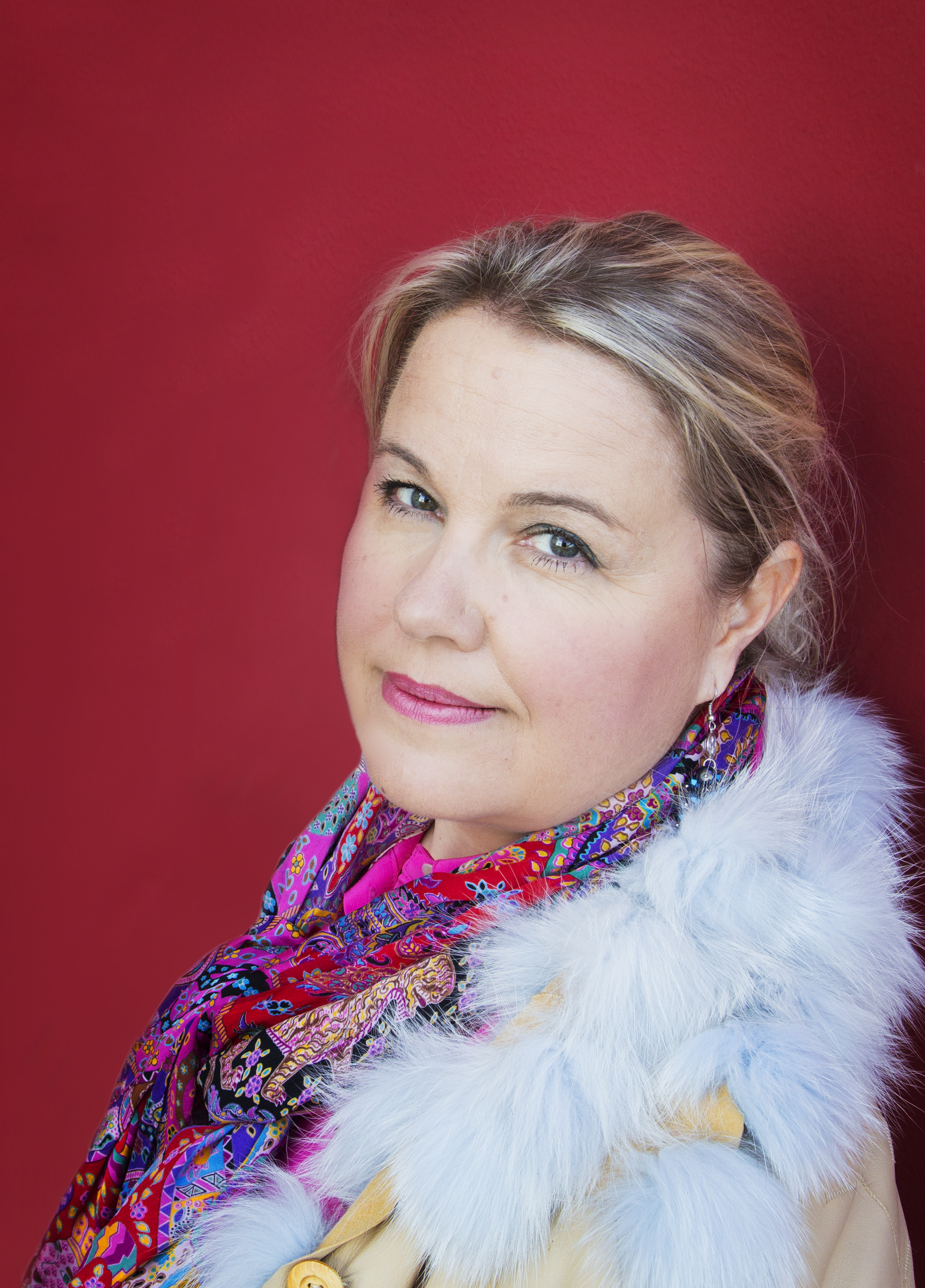

Anu Komsi (born 9 January 1967) is a Finnish operatic and concert soprano.

Komsi was born in Kokkola. She graduated in 1993 from the Sibelius Academy in Helsinki and gave her first concert. She sings jazz as well as classical music.

Komsi has been the soloist with numerous major orchestras like New York Philharmonic, Los Angeles Philharmonic, Berlin Philharmonic, BBC Symphony Orchestra London, DSO Berlin, La Scala Theatre Orchestra Milan, Vienna Symphony, City of Birmingham Symphony Orchestra, Mahler Chamber Orchestra, Chamber Orchestra of Europe, Ensemble Modern, Czech Philharmonic, Ensemble InterContemporain, London Sinfonietta, Oslo Philharmonic, Royal Stockholm Philharmonic, Philharmonic Orchestra of Radio France, Rotterdam Philharmonic, and Ostrobothnian Chamber Orchestra. She is a founding member and artistic director of West Coast Kokkola Opera.

Komsi is married to the conductor Sakari Oramo. She is the twin sister of soprano and cellist Piia Komsi.
