= Symphony No. 3 (Henze) =

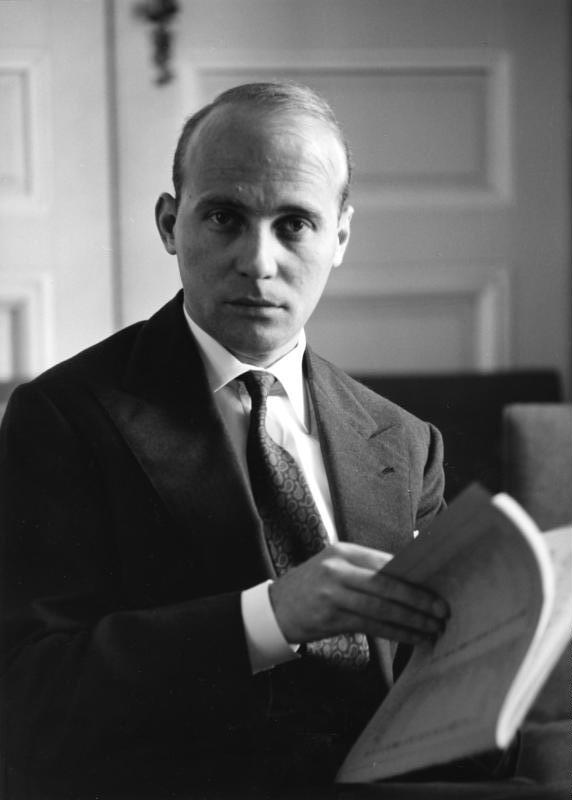
Hans Werner Henze in 1960

Hans Werner Henze's Symphony No. 3 was written between 1949 and 1950. It was premiered at the Donaueschingen Festival on 7 October 1951 by the South German Radio Symphony Orchestra conducted by Hans Rosbaud.

== Structure and style ==
The symphony is scored for piccolo, 2 flutes, 2 oboes, cor anglais, 2 clarinets, bass clarinet, tenor saxophone, 2 bassoons, contrabassoon, 4 horns, 4 trumpets, 3 trombones, tuba, percussion (4 players), harp, celesta, piano and strings.

It is in three movements:

1. Anrufung Apolls (Invocation of Apollo)
2. Dithyrambe (Dithyramb)
3. Beschwörungstanz (Incantation Dance)

A typical performance lasts approximately 25 minutes.

The first movement is broadly divided into three sections. The first is quiet, featuring the flutes, bass clarinet, bassoons and horns, developing into fanfares from the brass. This leads into the second section, a quick and accelerating Passacaglia. After a climax, the quiet mood of the beginning returns.

The second movement features the horn themes from the first which frame an Andantino section featuring the harp, which in turn frames a broad hymn-like central section.

The final movement has been described as "wild, almost orgiastic [and] dance based". Rhythms of 3/4 and 3/8 prevail and the mood is only interrupted briefly by a calm and canonic episode immediately before the "furious" ending.

Henze himself said that the symphony is an attempt to "separate the term "symphony" from the idea of Classical or Romantic forms." and has a "thoroughly Pagan atmosphere".

== Reception ==
The first performance at Donaueschingen was met with dismay by some of Henze's colleagues. According to Henze "Some people were not best pleased that the work failed to follow the modernist eclectics of the Darmstadt School."

== Ballet ==
In 1951 choreographer Peter van Dijk choreographed the Anrufung Apolls movement for an evening of ballet conducted by Henze on 28 October 1951 as part of the German-French Culture Days festival in Wiesbaden.

== Recordings ==
- American Symphony Orchestra records - American Symphony Orchestra conducted by Leon Botstein
- Deutsche Grammophon/Brilliant Classics - Berlin Philharmonic conducted by the composer
- Wergo - Berlin Radio Symphony Orchestra conducted by Marek Janowski
