= Ryan Bancroft =

American conductor

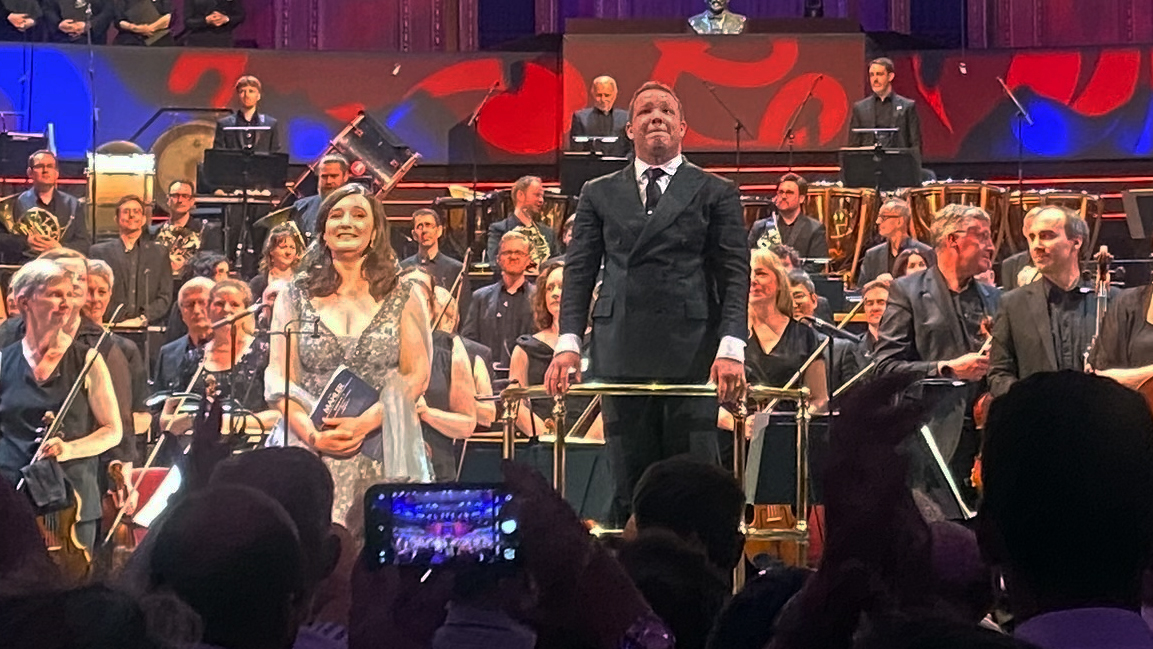
- Ryan Bancroft at the 2025 BBC Proms with mezzo-soprano Beth Taylor

Background information
- Born: 1989 (age 36–37); Lakewood, California
- Occupation: Conductor

Ryan Bancroft (born 1989) is an American conductor. He is principal conductor of the BBC National Orchestra of Wales and the Royal Stockholm Philharmonic Orchestra.

== Early life and education ==
Bancroft grew up in Lakewood, California, from a working-class background, where his father was a housepainter and his mother worked at a grocery. He attended the California Institute of the Arts (CalArts), where his academic studies focused on trumpet and his mentors included Edward Carroll. Bancroft also developed particular interests in drumming and Ghanaian dance. He earned a BFA degree from CalArts in 2011 and an MFA degree from CalArts in 2013.

== Career ==
One of Bancroft's earliest experiences in conducting was the direction of an ad hoc ensemble in the Requiem of Wolfgang Amadeus Mozart, in a memorial concert for his father in 2010. He continued conducting studies at the Royal Conservatoire of Scotland (RCS). During his studies at the RCS, he played trumpet with the BBC Scottish Symphony Orchestra (BBC SSO), and conducted the BBC SSO, Red Note, and the Royal Scottish National Orchestra. Bancroft graduated from the RCS in 2015. In The Netherlands, he participated in the Nationale Master Orkestdirectie via the Amsterdam Conservatory and the Royal Conservatoire of The Hague. His conducting mentors have included Kenneth Montgomery, Ed Spanjaard, and Jac van Steen.

In April 2018, Bancroft was the winner of both the First Prize and the Audience Prize of the Malko Competition for Young Conductors. During the competition, he conducted the de facto world premiere of the competition test composition Sarabande Blues, composed by Poul Ruders, as the first contestant to conduct the complete work without interruption.

In November 2018, Bancroft first guest-conducted the BBC National Orchestra of Wales (BBC NOW), as an emergency substitute for Xian Zhang. He returned as guest conductor to the BBC NOW in May 2019. In September 2019, the BBC NOW announced the appointment of Bancroft as its next principal conductor, effective with the 2020–2021 season, with an initial contract of 3 years. This appointment marks his first orchestral post, which he formally assumed in September 2020. Bancroft is the first American conductor to be named principal conductor of the BBC NOW. Bancroft concluded his tenure with the BBC NOW at the close of the 2025–2026 season.

In 2019, Bancroft first guest-conducted the Royal Stockholm Philharmonic Orchestra. In December 2021, the orchestra announced the appointment of Bancroft as its next principal conductor, effective with the 2023–2024 season.

== Personal life ==
Bancroft and his husband Tyler Smith reside in London.

Cultural offices
Preceded by Thomas Søndergård	Principal Conductor, BBC National Orchestra of Wales; 2020–2026	Succeeded by (post vacant)
Preceded by Sakari Oramo	Principal Conductor, Royal Stockholm Philharmonic Orchestra; 2023–present	Succeeded by incumbent
