= Gaudeamus International Composers Award =

The Gaudeamus International Composers Award is administered by the Gaudeamus Foundation. The prize is awarded yearly, to a young composer at a Dutch music concert during Gaudeamus Muziekweek.

== History ==
The Gaudeamus Foundation had held an annual music week of Dutch compositions since 1947, alternating with an international competition until 1959, since when all the events have been fully international.

== Winners ==
- 1957 Peter Schat (NL)
- 1958 Otto Ketting (NL)
- 1959 Louis Andriessen (NL)
- 1960 Lars Johan Werle (SE)
- 1961 Misha Mengelberg (NL), Per Nørgård (DK) and Enrique Raxach (ES/NL)
- 1962 Pauline Oliveros (US)
- 1963 Arne Mellnäs (SE)
- 1964 Ib Nørholm (DK)
- 1965 Joep Straesser (NL) and Mario Bertoncini (IT)
- 1966 Alfred Janson (NO) and Ton Bruynèl (NL)
- 1967 Hans-Joachim Hespos (DE), Costin Miereanu (RO/FR), Maurice Benhamou (FR), Jean-Yves Bosseur (FR) and Tona Scherchen (CH), Ralph Lundsten – Leo Nilson (SWE)
- 1968 Vinko Globokar (FR)
- 1969 Jos Kunst (NL)
- 1970 Jan Vriend (NL)
- 1971 John McGuire (US)
- 1972 Daniel Lentz (US)
- 1973 Maurice Weddington (US)
- 1974 Christian Dethleffsen (DE)
- 1975 Robert Saxton (UK)
- 1976 Fabio Vacchi (IT)
- 1977 Şerban Nichifor (RO)
- 1978 Stefan Dragostinov (BG)
- 1979–1983 no prizes awarded
- 1984 Mauro Cardi (IT)
- 1985 Unsuk Chin (KR)
- 1986 Uros Rojko (SI)
- 1987 Karen Tanaka (JP)
- 1988 Michael Jarrell (CH)
- 1989 Richard Barrett (UK)
- 1990 Claus-Steffen Mahnkopf (DE) and Paolo Aralla (IT)
- 1991 Asbjørn Schaathun (NO)
- 1992 Jörg Birkenkötter (DE)
- 1993 David del Puerto (ES)
- 1994 Richard Ayres (UK)
- 1995 Michael Oesterle (CA) and Jesus Torres (ES)
- 1996 Régis Campo (FR)
- 1997 Hang Zou (CN)
- 1998 Kumiko Omura (JP) and Geoff Hannan (UK)
- 1999 Michel van der Aa (NL)
- 2000 Yannis Kyriakides (CY/NL)
- 2001 Palle Dahlstedt (SE) and Takuya Imahori (JP)
- 2002 Valerio Murat (IT)
- 2003 Dmitri Kourliandski (RU)
- 2004 Sampo Haapamäki (FI)
- 2005 Oscar Bianchi (IT/CH)
- 2006 Lefteris Papadimitriou (GR) and Gabriel Paiuk (AR)
- 2007 Christopher Trapani (US)
- 2008 Huck Hodge (US)
- 2009 Ted Hearne (US)
- 2010 Marko Nikodijevic (RS/DE)
- 2011 Yoshiaki Onishi (JP/US)
- 2012 Konstantin Heuer (DE)
- 2013 Tobias Klich (Germany)
- 2014 Anna Korsun (Ukraine)
- 2015 Alexander Khubeev (RU)
- 2016 Anthony Vine (US)
- 2017 Aart Strootman (NL)
- 2018 Sebastian Hilli (FI)
- 2019 Kelley Sheehan (US)
- 2021 Annika Socolofsky (US)
- 2022 Rohan Chander (US)
- 2023 Zara Ali (US)
- 2024 Yixie Shen (CN)
- 2025 Matthew Grouse (UK)

== Nominees (not including the winners) ==
- 2022 Bekah Simms (CA), Alex Paxton (UK), Baldwin Giang (US), Bethany Younge (US)
- 2023 Artun Çekem (TR), Saad Haddad (US), Uri Kochavi (IL), Aya Yoshida (JP)
- 2024 Patrick Ellis (UK), Beniamino Fiorini (IT), Cem Güven (TR), Lucy McKnight (US)
- 2025 Golnaz Shariatzadeh (IR), Robin Haigh (UK), Yaz Lancaster (US)
