= Sampo Haapamäki =

Finnish composer (born 1979)

Sampo Haapamäki (born 3 February 1979) is a Finnish composer. He has won several international composition competitions.

== Education ==
Haapamäki studied at the Sibelius Academy in Helsinki with Tapio Nevanlinna and Veli-Matti Puumala. He has also studied with Claus-Steffen Mahnkopf in Leipzig, Germany and with Tristan Murail at Columbia University.

== Compositions ==
Haapamäki has embraced a quarter-tone-based language since 2004. Some of his compositions written in this style are: "Velinikka" (2008), for quarter-tone accordion and 18 musicians; "Kirjo" (2006), for bass clarinet and 26 musicians; "Design" (2005), for 16 musicians; "Fresh" (2004, 2007), for 15 musicians; "Maailmamaa" (2010), for mixed choir and tape.

Haapamäki’s compositions have been premiered, for example, by Veli Kujala (quarter-tone accordion) and Arctic Philharmonic Sinfonietta conducted by Tim Weiss, Tuuli Lindeberg (soprano) and Finnish Radio Symphony Orchestra conducted by Anna-Maria Helsing, Helsinki Philharmonic Orchestra conducted by Susanna Mälkki, Serge Lemouton (computer music designer) and International Contemporary Ensemble conducted by Christian Karlsen, Ensemble Court-Circuit conducted by Jean Deroyer, Elisa Järvi (quarter-tone piano) and Avanti! Chamber Orchestra conducted by Tomas Djupsjöbacka, Ensemble Musikfabrik conducted by Christian Eggen.

== Awards ==
- 2003 Finalist at the Queen Elisabeth Composition Competition
- 2004 Gaudeamus International Composers Award
- 2005 ISCM-CASH Young Composer Award
- 2006 Teosto Prize (in Finnish)]
- 2020 Nordic Council Music Prize for his Quarter-tone Piano Concerto

== Works ==
=== Symphony orchestra ===
- Motto (2015)
- Historia (2022)

=== Chamber orchestra ===
- Signature (2003)
- Fresh (2004, 2007)
- Design (2005)

=== Soloist(s) and orchestra ===
- Kirjo (2006) concerto for bass clarinet
- Velinikka (2008) concerto for quarter-tone accordion
- Conception (2012) double concerto for quarter-tone guitar and quarter-tone accordion
- Quarter-Tone Piano Concerto (2017)
- Quarter-Tone Accordion Concerto No. 2 (2025)

=== Ensemble ===
- Heritage (2016) for ensemble of Harry Partch instruments
- 24/7 (2019) for quarter-tone flute, quarter-tone clarinet, quarter-tone guitar, quarter-tone piano, quarter-tone accordion, violin and violoncello

=== Ensemble/instrument with electronics ===
- Logo (2013) for violin and 9-channel electronics
- IDEA (2018) for 11 musicians and 8-channel electronics

=== Concert band ===
- Sight (2001)

=== Big band ===
- Style (2001)

=== Chamber music ===
- Sonata (2000) for clarinet, marimba, piano and accordion
- Avenue (2000) for alto saxophone and piano
- Wide (2001) for clarinet, piano, violin, viola, cello
- Highway (2002) for flute and piano
- Connection (2007) for 2 violins, viola and cello

=== Solo instrument ===
- Emfa (2000) for tuba
- Tri (2000) for trombone
- Power (2001) for accordion

=== Vocal music ===
- Haljennut (2004) for sopranist-baritone, violin, viola and cello
- Maailmamaa (2010) for mixed choir and tape
