= Yoshiaki Onishi =

- Born: 1981 (age 44–45); Hokkaido, Japan
- Genre: Contemporary classical
- Occupations: Composer, Conductor, Clarinetist
- Instrument: Clarinet
- Years active: 2000-present
- Website: yoshionishi.com

Yoshiaki Onishi (大西 義明, Onishi Yoshiaki; born 1981 in Hokkaido, Japan) is a Japanese-American composer, conductor, and clarinetist. He is a recipient of several international prizes and honors. He currently resides in the United States. In 2018 he won a Guggenheim Fellowship and is currently the Assistant Professor of Music Composition at the University of Delaware School of Music.

== Education ==
In 2000 he entered the Conservatory of Music at the University of the Pacific, studying composition and clarinet, graduating in 2004. Between 2005 and 2008 he did his graduate studies in music composition at Yale University. In February 2015 he received his doctorate from Columbia University, where his principal teachers have been Fabien Lévy, Tristan Murail and Fred Lerdahl.

== Awards ==
- Fromm Commission (2018)
- Guggenheim Fellowship (2018)
- Civitella Ranieri Foundation Fellowship (2012)
- Gaudeamus International Composers Award (2011)

== Onishi as a composer ==
Onishi's music has been in part characterized by the engineering of timbres. In his 2009 work for string quartet, Culs-de-sac (en passacaille), he employs varieties of extended techniques for the string instruments. Anthony Tommasini of The New York Times said of the piece: “Who needs electronic instruments when a composer can draw such varied, eerily alluring sounds from good old string instruments?”.

Onishi's works have been commissioned by performers and organizations including Mayumi Miyata, Pacific Music Festival, Norfolk and Lucerne Festivals. His composition, Départ dans… was commissioned by Takefu International Music Festival in 2010, and became the winning piece of the Gaudeamus Prize in Music Composition in 2011.

Performance organizations, including JACK Quartet, Quatuor Diotima, Yarn/Wire, Nieuw Ensemble, Ensemble Intercontemporain, and Klangforum Wien have performed Onishi's works.

Since 2014, Onishi's works are published by Edition Gravis Verlag.

=== Works ===
The following is a partial list of works.

- Gz III (2019–20), for bass clarinet and bassoon
- Second String Quartet (2019–20)
- Antefenas-Studies (2018), for ensemble and electronics
- Vgf II (2011), for 15 players
- Gz, a Vuza Canon (2017), for tenor recorder and shakuhachi
- Envoi II (2017), for string trio
- Tramespace (2012–15), diptych for large ensemble
- Palinody (2010), for 14 players in 7 groups
- Départ dans... (2010), for 5 players
- Culs-de-sac (en passacaille) (2009, rev. 2010/18), for string quartet

== Onishi as a conductor ==
During his time at the University of Missouri School of Music in Columbia, Missouri, Onishi became an assistant conductor of the Mizzou New Music Ensemble. Previously he was an assistant conductor of the Columbia University Orchestra until 2013. He is also affiliated with New York-based percussion ensemble Iktus Percussion as a conductor of the Iktus+. He has also guest conducted several ensembles, including the Wet Ink Ensemble.
