= Sakari Oramo =

Finnish conductor (born 1965)

Sakari Oramo OBE
- Born: Sakari Markus Oramo; 26 October 1965 (age 61); Helsinki, Finland
- Education: Sibelius Academy, Helsinki
- Occupations: Conductor of classical music (active 1993–present)
- Known for: Conductor of: Finnish Radio Symphony Orchestra; City of Birmingham Symphony Orchestra; Royal Stockholm Philharmonic Orchestra; BBC Symphony Orchestra
- Spouse: Anu Komsi (m. 1988)
- Children: 2

Sakari Markus Oramo OBE (born 26 October 1965) is a Finnish conductor. He is chief conductor of the BBC Symphony Orchestra.

== Biography and career ==
Born in Helsinki, Oramo is the son of two music academics who taught at the Sibelius Academy, Ilkka Oramo, a professor of music theory, and Liisa Pohjola, a piano professor. His sister is Anna-Maaria Oramo. Oramo started his career as a violinist and concertmaster of the Finnish Radio Symphony Orchestra. In 1989, he enrolled in Jorma Panula's conducting class at the Sibelius Academy. In 1993, just one year after completing the course, he stood in for a sick conductor with the Finnish Radio Symphony Orchestra. Oramo has also worked with Finland's Avanti! ensemble. Oramo became principal guest conductor of the Ostrobothnian Chamber Orchestra in 1995, and one of its principal conductors in 2009. In 2013, he became the orchestra's artistic director.

=== City of Birmingham Symphony Orchestra ===
In September 1996, Oramo was named principal conductor of the City of Birmingham Symphony Orchestra (CBSO), having conducted the CBSO in two concerts prior to that appointment. He then assumed the post of music director and artistic advisor in 1998. His work in Birmingham included the Floof! festival of contemporary music. He also championed the music of John Foulds in concerts and recordings with the CBSO.

Oramo was at the forefront of the Edward Elgar sesquicentenary celebrations in 2007, and was awarded the Elgar Medal in 2008 for his efforts in advancing Elgar's music. In 2008, Oramo stepped down as the CBSO's music director and became the orchestra's principal guest conductor for the 2008–2009 season.

In April 2007, Oramo was one of eight conductors of British orchestras to endorse the 10-year classical music outreach manifesto, "Building on Excellence: Orchestras for the 21st Century", to increase the presence of classical music in the UK, including giving free entry to all British schoolchildren to a classical music concert. In addition to his conducting and recording work, Oramo has also published newspaper articles on music.

=== European career ===
From 2003 to 2012, Oramo was sole principal conductor of the Finnish Radio Symphony Orchestra. Oramo and his wife Anu Komsi, together with Annika Mylläri and Robert McLoud, founded West Coast Kokkola Opera in 2004. Oramo has served as its vice chairman and principal conductor.

In September 2008, Oramo became chief conductor and artistic advisor of the Royal Stockholm Philharmonic Orchestra. His initial contract in Stockholm was for three years. With the Royal Stockholm Philharmonic, he has recorded symphonies of Robert Schumann. In 2011, Oramo's contract with the Royal Stockholm Philharmonic was extended to 2015. In April 2016, his Stockholm contract was further extended to 2021. He concluded his chief conductorship of the Royal Stockholm Philharmonic at the close of the 2020–2021 season. He has made commercial recordings with the Royal Stockholm Philharmonic for such labels as BIS.

In March 2023, Oramo first guest-conducted the Gürzenich Orchestra Cologne. In October 2024, the Gürzenich Orchestra Cologne announced the appointment of Oramo to the newly-created position of 'Artistic Partner', effective with the 2025–2026 season, with an initial contract of five seasons.

=== BBC Symphony Orchestra ===
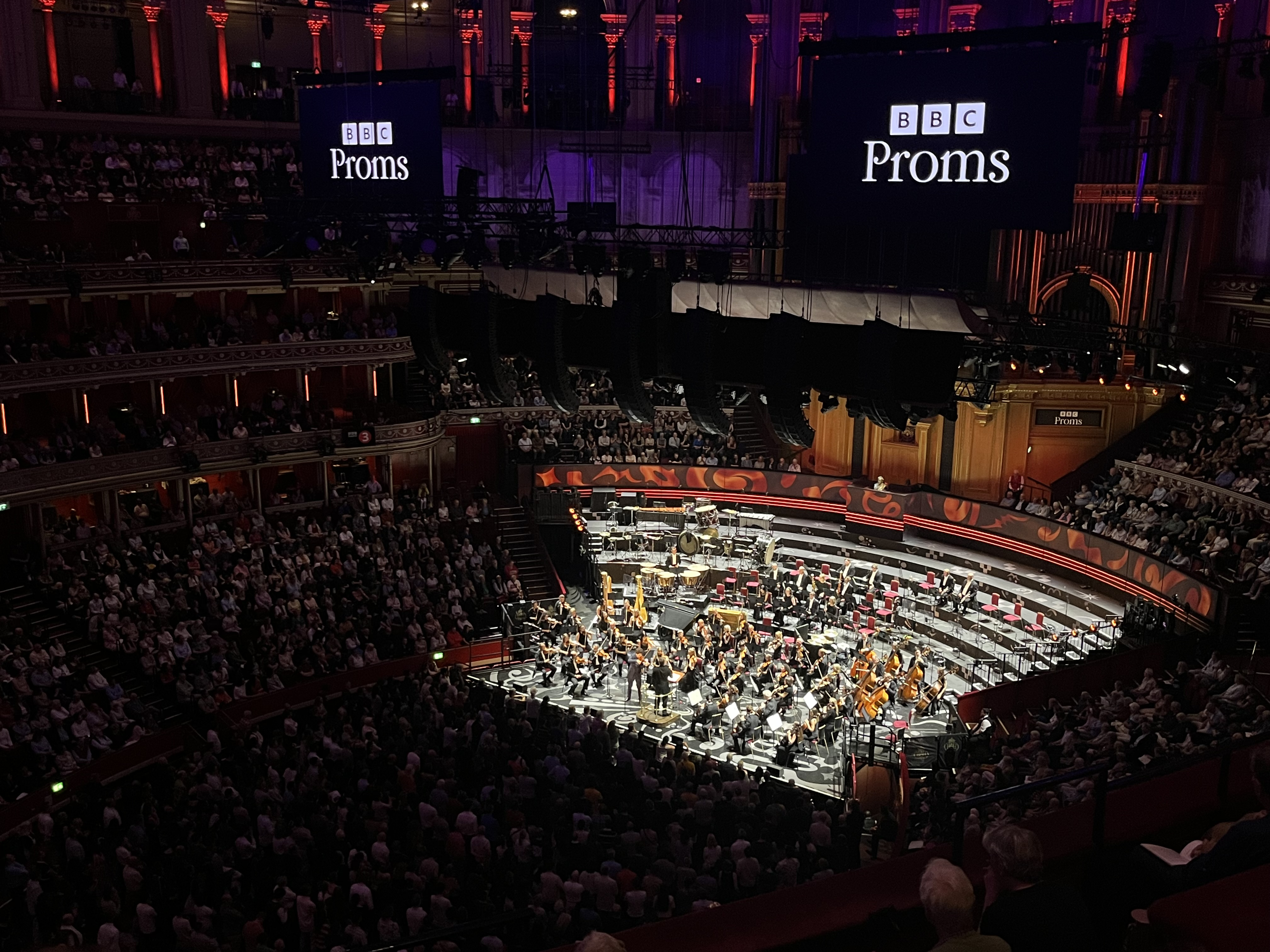
Sakari Oramo conducts the BBC Symphony Orchestra at the Royal Albert Hall

In October 2011, Oramo made his first guest conducting appearance with the BBC Symphony Orchestra (BBC SO), his first guest-conducting engagement with any London orchestra. On the basis of this concert, in February 2012, Oramo was named the 13th chief conductor of the BBC SO, effective with the First Night of the 2013 Proms season. His initial contract was for three years, with a pending subsequent option for an additional two years. Oramo held the title of chief conductor designate for the 2012–2013 season. In September 2015, the BBC SO announced the extension of his contract to the 2019–2020 season. In May 2018, the BBC SO indicated a further extension of Oramo's contract through 2022.

In October 2020, the BBC SO announced a further extension of Oramo's contract as chief conductor through September 2023. In April 2022, the BBC SO announced an additional extension of Oramo's contract as its chief conductor through the end of the 2025–2026 season. In September 2024, the BBC SO announced a further extension of Oramo's contract as its chief conductor to 2030. He has recorded commercially with the BBC SO with such labels as harmonia mundi and Chandos, including the second commercial recording of William Alwyn's Miss Julie.

=== Additional biography ===
Oramo and Komsi have two sons, Taavi and Leevi. In May 2009, Oramo was awarded an honorary OBE for services to music in Birmingham. In March 2017, the Sibelius Academy announced the appointment of Oramo as professor of orchestral training and orchestral conducting, with a contract scheduled from 1 January 2020 through 31 December 2024. Oramo is scheduled to conclude his academic contract with the Sibelius Academy at the close of the 2024–2025 academic year.

Cultural offices
Preceded by Jukka-Pekka Saraste	Principal Conductor, Finnish Radio Symphony Orchestra; 2003–2012	Succeeded by Hannu Lintu
Preceded by Alan Gilbert	Principal Conductor, Royal Stockholm Philharmonic Orchestra; 2008–2021	Succeeded by Ryan Bancroft
Preceded by Juha Kangas	Artistic Director, Ostrobothnian Chamber Orchestra; 2013–2019	Succeeded by Malin Broman
