= Veli-Matti Puumala =

Finnish composer (born 1965)

Veli-Matti Puumala (born 18 July 1965) is a Finnish composer. He is currently (since 2005) the professor of composition at the Sibelius Academy.

Puumala was born in Kaustinen, and studied composition in Helsinki under Paavo Heininen from 1984 to 1993 and in Siena under Franco Donatoni in 1989 and 1990. His musical style is rooted in European Modernism, but has been also described to contain stylised references to folk music and modal elements. In addition to instrumental and vocal music, Puumala has also composed a number of electronic works and one radiophonic work, Rajamailla (Borderlands), which won the Prix Italia in 2001. His piano concerto Seeds of Time was awarded the Teosto Prize by the Finnish Composers' Copyright Society in 2005, and in 2011 he was awarded the Erik Bergman Jubilee Prize "in recognition of his excellent, versatile work continuing the ethical and spiritual tradition of Modernism". Puumala is also known as a musical educator: he has taught music theory since 1989 and composition since 1997 at the Sibelius Academy and was appointed as a professor of composition in 2005.

== Selected works ==
- Scroscio (1989) for chamber ensemble
- Verso (1990–91) for chamber ensemble
- Ghirlande (1992) for chamber ensemble
- Line to Clash (1991–93) for orchestra
- Tutta via (1992–93) for chamber orchestra
- String Quartet (1994)
- Chant Chains (1994–95) for chamber orchestra
- Chains of Camenæ (1995–96) for orchestra
- Soira (1996) for accordion and chamber orchestra
- Chainsprings (1995–97) for orchestra
- Taon (1998-2000) for double bass and chamber orchestra
- Seeds of Time (2004) for piano and orchestra
- Mure (2008) for chamber ensemble
- Anna Liisa (2001–08), opera in three acts, libretto by the composer and Tiina Käkelä-Puumala based on a play by Minna Canth.
- Rope (2010–12) for orchestra
- Tear (2012–13) for chamber orchestra
- Rime (2012–13) for string orchestra
- Root (2015-17) for orchestra

== Sources ==
- Hillilä, Ruth-Ester and Hong, Barbara B. 1997. "Historical Dictionary of the Music and Musicians of Finland". Greenwood. ISBN 978-0313277283
