= Royal Stockholm Philharmonic Orchestra =

Symphony orchestra based in Stockholm

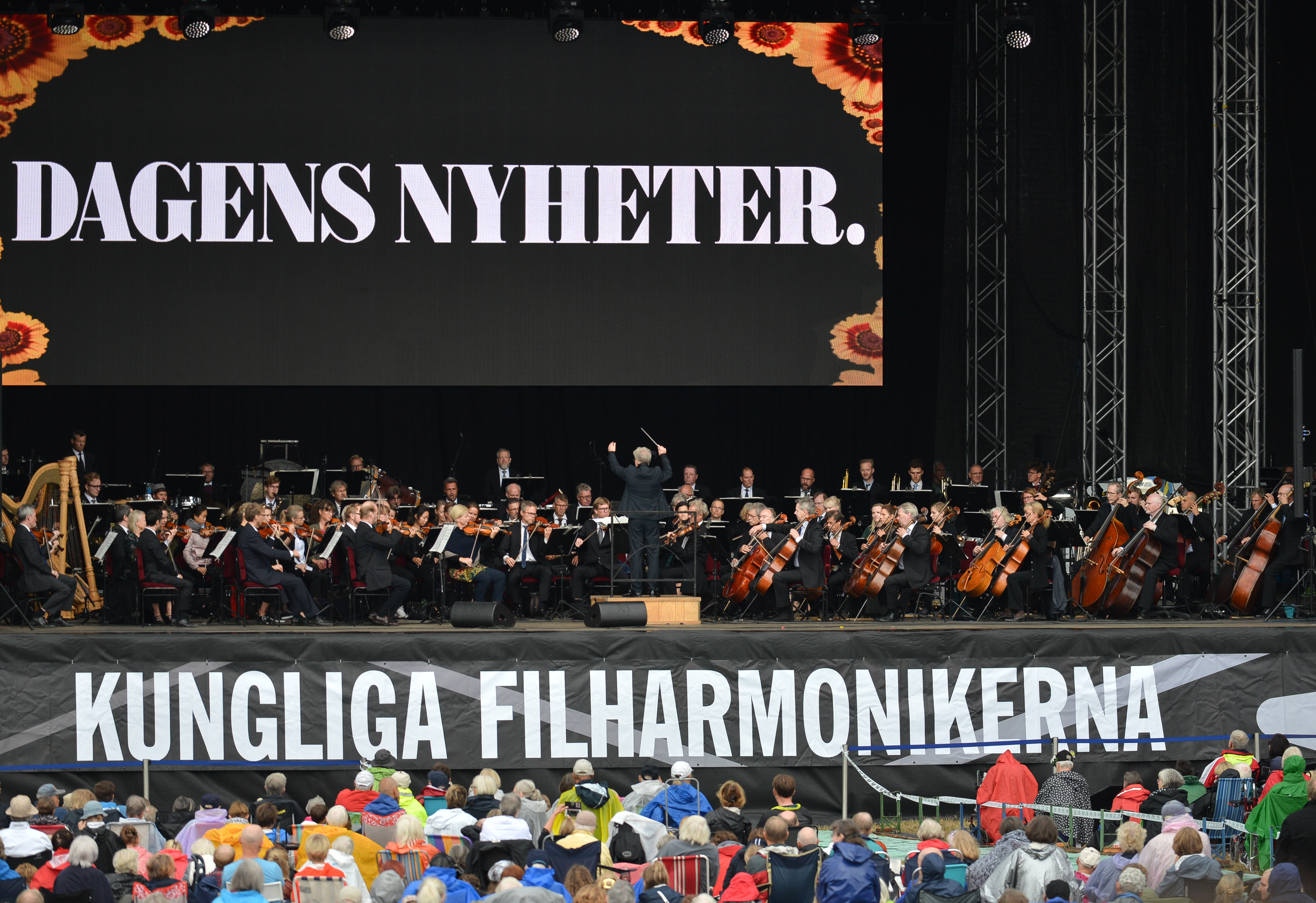
Kungliga Filharmonikerna in 2018

The Royal Stockholm Philharmonic Orchestra (Swedish: Kungliga Filharmonikerna or Kungliga Filharmoniska Orkestern, literal translations, "Royal Philharmonic" or "Royal Philharmonic Orchestra" (Note: In Swedish, "Stockholm" is not included in the orchestra's title. The English version of the orchestra's name includes "Stockholm" to distinguish this orchestra from the Royal Philharmonic Orchestra, London.)) is a Swedish orchestra based in Stockholm. Its principal venue is the Konserthuset.

== History ==
The orchestra was founded in 1902 as the Stockholm Concert Society Orchestra (Stockholms konsertförenings orkester). It became a permanent ensemble in 1914. Since 1926, it has been based at Stockholm Concert Hall (Konserthuset). Starting in 1937, Radiotjänst (now Swedish Radio) utilized the orchestra as its main broadcast orchestra, in lieu of having its in-house orchestra. In 1957, it was renamed the Stockholm Philharmonic Orchestra (Stockholms Filharmoniska Orkester). In 1992 it acquired its present name, with patronage from the Swedish royal family.

Georg Schnéevoigt was the orchestra's first principal conductor, from 1915 to 1924. Its current principal conductor is Sakari Oramo, since 2008, with an initial contract of 3 years. In 2011, Oramo's contract with the orchestra was extended until 2015. In April 2016, the orchestra announced a further extension of Oramo's contract until 2021. Oramo concluded his chief conductorship of the Royal Stockholm Philharmonic at the close of the 2020–2021 season and now has the title of hedersdirigent (conductor laureate) of the orchestra.

In 2019, Ryan Bancroft first guest-conducted the orchestra. In December 2021, the orchestra announced the appointment of Bancroft as its next principal conductor, effective with the 2023-2024 season.

The orchestra participates annually in the Nobel Prize ceremonies and the Polar Prize for music celebrations. It also holds two annual festivals at its home, the Stockholm Concert Hall, namely the Stockholm International Composer Festival and Composer Weekend in May, focusing on a contemporary Swedish composer.

== Principal conductors ==
- Georg Schnéevoigt (1915–1924)
- Václav Talich (1926–1936)
- Fritz Busch (1937–1940)
- Carl Garaguly (1942–1953)
- Hans Schmidt-Isserstedt (1955–1964)
- Antal Doráti (1966–1974)
- Gennadi Rozhdestvensky (1974–1977)
- Yuri Ahronovitch (1982–1987)
- Paavo Berglund (1987–1990)
- Gennadi Rozhdestvensky (1991–1995)
- Guest conductors: Andrew Davis and Paavo Järvi (1995–1998)
- Alan Gilbert (2000–2008)
- Sakari Oramo (2008–2021)
- Ryan Bancroft (2023–present)
