= Philippe Leroux =

French composer (born 1959)

Philippe Leroux (born 24 September 1959) is a French composer living in Montreal, Quebec, who has been identified as "one of the most important composers in contemporary music."

== Biography ==
Leroux was born in Boulogne-Billancourt. He studied composition starting in 1978 with Ivo Malec, Claude Ballif, Pierre Schaeffer, and Guy Rebeil at the Paris Conservatoire National Supérieur de Musique, where he obtained three first prizes. He studied at both the Groupe de Recherches Musicales and at IRCAM during this period. He was selected for a residency at the French Academy in Rome from 1993 to 1995.

From 2001 to 2006 he was a composition teacher at IRCAM, in the Cursus d’Informatique Musicale programme. Since 2011 he has been an associate professor in composition at the Schulich School of Music, McGill University.

== Selected works ==
- (D)Tourner (2016/17) for solo percussion and 10 instruments
- Envers IV (2016) for symphony orchestra
- Postlude à l'Épais (2016) for flute, clarinet, violin, cello and piano
- De l'imitation (2015) for saxophone quartet and electronics
- White face (2015) for string quartet
- Nomadic Sounds (2015) for a cappella choir
- Quid sit musicus (2013/14) for 4 voices, guitar, cello, and electronics
- Total SOLo (2013) for 28 instruments
- Ailes (2012) for baritone and 15 instruments
- De l'itération (2012) for 6 percussionists
- ...Ami...chemin...oser...vie... (2011) for 15 instruments
- Extended Apocalypsis (2011) for 4 voices, 16 instruments, electronics, and video ad libitum.
- Envers Symphonie (2010) for symphony orchestra
- Pourquoi? (2009) for 4 voices and orchestra
- Objets trouvés ...posés (2009) acousmatic
- AMA (2009) for solo piano
- L’unique trait de pinceau (2008/9) for saxophone and symphony orchestra
- De la texture (2007) for 8 instruments
- Pour que les êtres ne soient pas traités comme des marchandises (2004) for 12 mixed voices, orchestra, and ad libitum electronics
- m'M (2003) concerto grosso for symphony orchestra
- Du souffle (2003) for saxophone quartet
- Airs (2003) for saxophone and percussion
- Voi(Rex) (2002) for voice, 6 instruments, and electronics
- Les Uns (2001) for 3 percussionists
- De la Vitesse (2001) for 6 percussionists
- SPP (2000) for soprano saxophone and piano
- Plus loin (1999–2000) for symphony orchestra
- M.É. (1998) acousmatic
- M (1997) for 2 pianos, 2 percussion and electronics
- AAA (1996) for 7 instruments
- Souffles (1996) for wind quintet
- (d')Aller (1995) for solo violin and 16 instruments
- Continuo(ns) (1994) for quintet
- PPP (1993) for flute and piano
- AIR (1993) for B♭ clarinet and percussion
- AIR-RÉ (1992) for violin and percussion
- Je brûle, dit-elle un jour à un camarade (1990) for voice
