= Kimmo Hakola =

Finnish composer

Kimmo Hannu Tapio Hakola (born 27 July 1958) is a Finnish composer. Born in Jyväskylä, he studied composition with Einojuhani Rautavaara and Magnus Lindberg at Sibelius Academy. He first came to prominence with his First String Quartet, which won the Unesco Composers' Rostrum in 1987.

Among his best-known works are his Clarinet Concerto, Piano Concerto (1996), Violin Concerto (2012) and Guitar Concerto. Apart from concertos he has written several orchestral works, chamber music and solo pieces for different instruments. He has also composed operas including the cartoon opera Mastersingers of Mars (2000), the family opera Mara and Katti (2011) and the monologue opera Akseli (2012). His opera La Fenice was performed at the Savonlinna Opera Festival in 2012. His Concerto Fidl, Op.99, was the test piece for the finalists of the 2019 Queen Elisabeth Competition for Violin and was written specially for that occasion.
