= Huddersfield Contemporary Music Festival =

English music festival

The Huddersfield Contemporary Music Festival (also known by the acronym HCMF, stylised since 2006 as the lowercase hcmf) is a new music festival held annually in Huddersfield, West Yorkshire, England. Since its foundation in 1978, it has featured major international figures of experimental and avant garde music, including guest composers such as Karlheinz Stockhausen, Louis Andriessen, Terry Riley, Brian Eno, John Cage, Steve Reich, Jonathan Harvey, Helmut Lachenmann and Sir Harrison Birtwistle. Its programme also includes improvisation, installation, sound sculptures, happenings, new technology and free jazz.

The festival is held across several venues in the town, including the Lawrence Batley Theatre, Huddersfield Town Hall, St Paul's Hall, St Thomas's Church, and the Creative Arts Building of the University of Huddersfield. There is also a Festival Hub which offers refreshments, CDs and free live shows every morning of the festival.

The Huddersfield Contemporary Music Festival archive is held at the University of Huddersfield Archives at Heritage Quay.

== History ==
The festival was founded at the suggestion of Richard Phillips, then music officer of the Yorkshire Arts Association. Richard Steinitz, a composer and lecturer at Huddersfield Polytechnic (later to become the University of Huddersfield), was appointed the festival director. The first concert was held on 13 October 1978.

Steinitz was succeeded as director by Susanna Eastburn in 2001 and guest director Tom Service in 2005. The current director is Graham McKenzie, who was appointed in 2006.

=== 2005 ===
The festival was held from 17 to 27 November.

=== 2006 ===
The festival took place from 17 to 26 November. On the event list was Kitchen Motors, and Psappha.

=== 2008 ===
The festival ran from 21 to 30 November. A highlight was the performance of several Frank Zappa pieces by the Ascolta ensemble with guests.

=== 2009 ===
The festival ran from 20 to 29 November. Jonathan Harvey was composer in residence, and the festival also featured the Arditti Quartet, Nieuw Ensemble, Louis Andriessen and musikFabrik.

=== 2010 ===
The festival ran from 19 to 28 November. The composer in residence was Rebecca Saunders.

=== 2011 ===
In 2011 Bent Sørensen was composer in residence.

=== 2012 ===
The composer in residence for 2012 was Maja Ratkje.

=== 2020 ===
The COVID-19 pandemic saw the festival realised in a reduced form, with live events restricted by the UK's lockdown of autumn 2020. The programme included a livestream by Space Afrika, and BBC Radio 3 live broadcasts with Explore Ensemble, GBSR Duo, and London Sinfonietta, featuring music by Joanna Bailie, Oliver Leith, Cassandra Miller, Arne Gieshoff, Angharad Davies, and James Dillon .

=== 2021 ===
Chaya Czernowin was composer in residence, and the programme featured composers and artists including Brigitta Muntendorf, Georgia Rodgers, Mauro Lanza & Andrea Valle, Eva Maria Houben, James Dillon, Enno Poppe, Cath Roberts, Clara Iannotta, Bára Gísladóttir, Hannah Kendall, Laurence Osborn, Eva Reiter, John Butcher, Laurence Crane, Luke Nickel, Lisa Illean. Performer and groups included Explore Ensemble, GBSR duo, Red Note Ensemble, Ensemble Musikfabrik, The Riot Ensemble, Ensemble Klang, Arditti Quartet, Ictus Ensemble, Juliet Fraser & Mark Knoop, Zubin Kanga, London Sinfonietta

=== 2022 ===
Lisa Streich was composer in residence. The programme featured composers and artists Jürg Frey, Liza Lim, Philip Venables, Pat Thomas, Jan Hendrickse, Raven Chacon, Andreas Borregaard, Tyshawn Sorey, Justė Janulytė. Performers and groups included Decibel, Australian Art Orchestra, Crash Ensemble, Quatuor Diotima, Riot Ensemble, Marco Blaauw, London Sinfonietta, Red Note Ensemble, and Ensemble Intercontemporain.

=== 2023 ===
Jennifer Walshe was composer in residence, and the programme featured composers and artists including Rebecca Saunders, Laura Bowler, Angharad Davies, Steven Daverson, Žibuoklė Martinaitytė, Lisa Illean, Nicole Lizée, John Butcher, Liza Lim, Michel Chion. George Lewis, Hans Werner Henze, Anna Korsun, Charles Uzor, Tyshawn Sorey, Mariam Rezaei, Jürg Frey, and Bára Gísladóttir. Performers and groups included Oslo Sinfonietta, GBSR Duo, Nadar Ensemble, Ensemble Nikel & Noa Frenkel, Ensemble Synaesthesis, Lee Patterson, Stone Drawn Circles, Apartment House, London Sinfonietta, Exaudi, Quatuor Bozzini, Matmos, Éliane Radigue, and Riot Ensemble.
