= November Music =

November Music is an annual international festival of contemporary music in the Netherlands on various locations in 's-Hertogenbosch. Its motto is 'Today's Music by Today's Makers'.

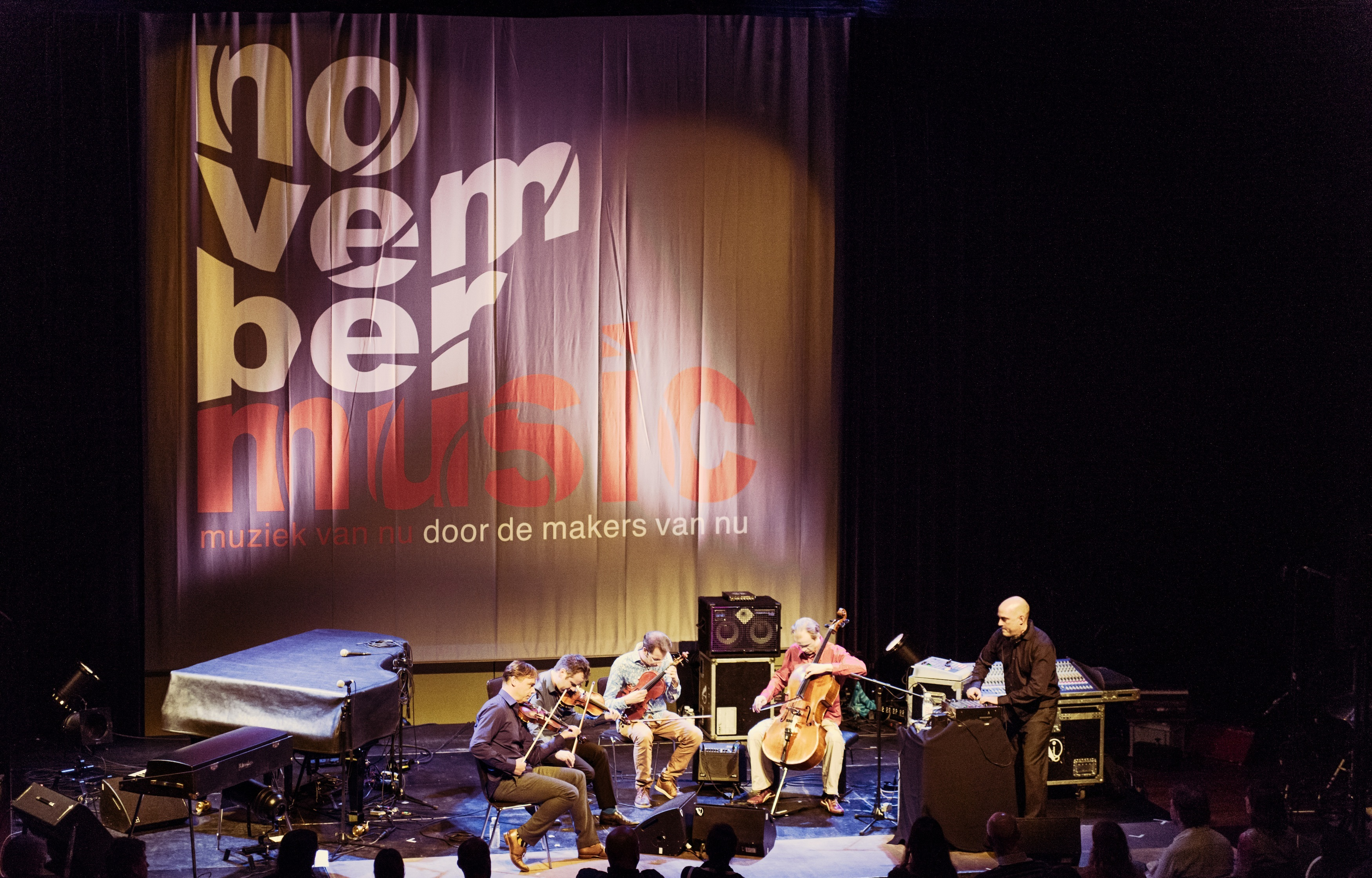
November Music2013

The ten-day festival is held in the first half of November. It offers a programme of contemporary composed music, jazz and improvisation, avant-garde world music, sound installations, electronic music, modern opera, music theatre, and interdisciplinary performances. Concerts are staged in different venues.

== History ==
The first November Music took place in 1993. There is an ongoing collaboration with various international festivals. In recent years, November Music has also organised concerts outside the scope of the festival in other Dutch cities.

Composers and musicians who have featured in the festival include Sofia Gubaidulina, Mauricio Kagel, John Zorn, Louis Andriessen, Martijn Padding, Heiner Goebbels, Frederic Rzewski, Daniel Johnston, Mayke Nas, Michel van der Aa, Nik Bärtsch, Kayhan Kalhor, Helmut Lachenmann, Christian Wolff. Furthermore, groups like Kronos Quartet, Arditti Quartet, Ensemble Modern, musikFabrik, Asko Ensemble, Nederlands Kamerkoor and Raschèr Saxophone Quartet gave presence at November Music.

November Music regularly links up Dutch jazz musicians with improvisators from other countries and arranges a first get-together on stage. Some combinations initiated by November Music: Yuri Honing and Mathias Eick, Anton Goudsmit and The Bad Plus, Vijay Iyer and Misha Mengelberg, Marc Ribot and ZAPP4, Martin Fondse and Matthew Herbert, ZAPP4 and Jan Bang, Rembrandt Frerichs Trio and Kayhan Kalhor.

=== Sound art installations ===
Since 2012 November Music also has a sound art program. Initially organized by sound artist Horst Rickels. Since 2016 sound art organisation iii became the curator of a special line-up featuring sound installations and sound sculptures. Pierre Bastien (among others) was part of the 2016 line-up in this program. The 2017 edition had programmed Yuri Landman, Mariska de Groot and Dmitry Morozov (a.k.a. Vtol) and others. This program happens in the Kruithuis, a 1620 built military magazine.

== Previous editions ==
=== 2021 ===
Hawar Tawfiq composed the Bosch Requiem, other artists and performers included Rebecca Saunders, Kaija Saariaho, Accentu, Julius Eastman, Explore Ensemble perform Mauro Lanza and Andrea Valle, and with Juliet Fraser, Ensemble Musikfabrik perform Enno Poppe and Richard Rijnvos, Silbersee & Ariane Schluter, Ensemble Klang, Spectra Ensemble perform Georg Friedrich Haas, Juliet Fraser performs Rebecca Saunders, Quatuor Diotima perform Mauro Lanza, Marco Blaauw, Ensemble Modern, Ensemble Nikel & Noa Frenkel, Ensemble Klang & Agata Zubel, Metropole Orkest & Louis Cole, and The Gurdjieff Ensemble.

=== 2022 ===
Joey Roukens composed the Bosch Requiem, and Remy van Kesteren was the artist-in-residence, with other artists and performers including Nederlands Kamerkoor, Amsterdam Sinfonietta, Willem Boogman, Patrick van Deurzen, Micha Hamel, Martijn Padding, Bryce Dessner, Jürg Frey, Silbersee and Ensemble Lucilin, and Beatrice Dillon as part of the FAQ Festival. Younger artists including Rick van Veldhuizen, Jan-Peter de Graaff, Lucas Wiegerink, Bram Kortekaas, Celia Swart, Petra Strahovnik.

=== 2023 ===
John Zorn, Barbara Hannigan, Jennifer Walshe, Rebecca Saunders, Simon-Steen Andersen, Tristan Murail, Oslo Sinfonietta, Jack Quartet and The Crossing, goat (jp), Aart Strootman, Maya Fridman, Rozalie Hirs, Kika Sprangers, Jameszoo and LudoWic.

== Sources ==
- Brabants Dagblad
- NRC Handelsblad
- Stadsblad 's-Hertogenbosch
- Written in Music
- ECPNM
