= Spasov =

Spasov or Spassov (Bulgarian: Спасов) is a Bulgarian masculine surname, its feminine counterpart is Spasova or Spassova . Notable people with the surname include:

- Anton Spasov (born 1975), Bulgarian footballer
- Bozhidar Spasov (born 1949), Bulgarian composer
- Daniel Spassov, Bulgarian folk singer
- Dime Spasov (born 1985), Macedonian politician
- Emil Spasov (born 1956), Bulgarian footballer
- Ferario Spasov (born 1962), Bulgarian football coach
- Hristo Spasov (born 1988), Bulgarian footballer
- Jeanette Spassova (born 1962), Bulgarian actress
- Larisa Spasova (born 1960), Bulgarian basketball player
- Luben Spasov (1943–2023), Bulgarian chess grandmaster
- Nikola Spasov (1958–2020), Bulgarian footballer
- Petar Spasov (born 1934), Bulgarian boxer
- Rositsa Spasova (born 1954), Bulgarian rower
- Rumyana Spasova (born 1989), Bulgarian pair skater
- Saltirka Spasova-Tarpova (born 1933), Bulgarian gymnast
- Slavi Spasov (born 2001), Bulgarian footballer
- Spas Spasov (born 1990), Bulgarian footballer
- Theodosii Spassov (born 1961), Bulgarian jazz musician
- Valentin Spasov (born 1946), Bulgarian basketball player
- Vasil Spasov (disambiguation) – multiple people

== See also ==
- Spasova, a rural locality in Leninskoye Rural Settlement, Kudymkarsky District, Perm Krai, Russia
