= Juliet Fraser =

British soprano

Juliet Fraser is a British soprano, based in London and specialising in contemporary classical music. She has commissioned more than 20 solo vocal works and premiered several hundred new works, many written for her. Fraser is the artistic director of eavesdropping, an experimental music festival in East London, and co-director of all that dust, the record label she founded in 2018 with Mark Knoop and Newton Armstrong. She was awarded an Honorary Doctorate of Music by the University of Southampton in 2023.

== Education ==
Fraser studied at the Purcell School and at the University of Cambridge, where she read Music and History of Art. Initially an oboist, she began her vocal training at the age of 21, combining private lessons with freelance performing.

== Early career ==
A former chorister in the chapel choir of Clare College, Cambridge, Fraser began her professional career singing with British choirs such as Polyphony, Tenebrae, the Monteverdi Choir and BBC Singers. In 2002, she co-founded EXAUDI vocal ensemble with James Weeks and was executive director of the group until 2014. She remains one of the core members, performing early and contemporary music around Europe. She was a member of the soloists of Collegium Vocale Gent (dir. Philippe Herreweghe) from 2007 to 2012, performing and recording Renaissance polyphony by Orlande de Lassus, Tomas Luis de Victoria, Carlo Gesualdo and William Byrd.

== Contemporary music ==
Fraser is best known as an interpreter of contemporary classical music. Her repertoire focuses on new works for solo voice, voice and tape/electronics, voice and piano (with duo partner Mark Knoop), and voice and ensemble.

She has performed as a soloist with Ensemble MusikFabrik, Klangforum Wien, Ensemble Modern, London Sinfonietta, BBC Scottish Symphony Orchestra, Asko|Schönberg, Talea Ensemble, Remix Ensemble, Plus-Minus, Quatuor Bozzini, and Explore Ensemble. She has a long-standing duo with pianist Mark Knoop.

Festival appearances include Aldeburgh Festival, Huddersfield Contemporary Music Festival, TECTONICS Glasgow, IRCAM's ManiFeste Paris, Lucerne Festival, Milano Musica, Munich Biennale, Musikfest Berlin, November Music and TIME:SPANS (NYC). She has performed at venues including the Wigmore Hall, Queen Elizabeth Hall and Kings Place London, Symphony Hall Birmingham, Berlin Philharmonie, Elbphilharmonie Hamburg, Alte Oper Frankfurt, Wiener Konzerthaus, Centre Pompidou Paris, L'Auditori Barcelona, Casa da Música Porto and Helsinki Music Centre.

Fraser has developed particularly close partnerships with a range of significant contemporary composers. In 2016 she premiered Bernhard Lang's The Cold Trip, part 2 at the MaerzMusik festival in Berlin and Michael Finnissy's Andersen-Liederkreis at Transit festival in Belgium, both with pianist Mark Knoop. In the same year, Rebecca Saunders wrote Skin for Fraser and Klangforum Wien; it was premiered at the Donaueschingen Festival and performed again at the Huddersfield Contemporary Music Festival, where she was described as sounding "positively alien at various points, adding unsettling frissons to our perception of the nature of the voice". The premiere recording of this work appears on the Donaueschingen-released recording from that year. Fraser has given premiere performances of a number of works by Saunders, notably The Mouth, for voice and electronics, in 2020. In the 2021/22 season she premiered two new works by Pascale Criton.

Since 2016 Fraser has been collaborating with Canadian composer Cassandra Miller, resulting in an ongoing and modular series of compositions called Tracery. This project had its first outing at Cafe OTO and subsequent iterations have been programmed by Experimental Sound Studio Chicago, Klangspuren in Schwaz and Bastard Assignments.

Fraser has performed Gerard Grisey’s final work Quatre chants pour franchir le seuil across Europe, including a performance in 2019 with conductor Susanna Mälkki and Scholars of the Karajan Academy at the Berlin Philarmonie as part of Musikfest Berlin, where she "sang the solo part with pathos and a beautifully dark hue".

During a series of summer concerts at Snape Maltings in 2021, Fraser performed a double bill of Samuel Beckett’s Not I and Morton Feldman’s Three Voices. Her performance was described as a “tremendous tour de force”, with “every element perfectly executed”. In 2022, she performed Feldman's monumental Neither at the Melos-Ethos Festival in Bratislava.

Recent premieres include Laurence Crane's Natural World performed at Musica Sacra, Maastricht in September 2021, and subsequently at Oxford Lieder Festival, Huddersfield Contemporary Music Festival and Music We'd Like to Hear, London; Christopher Fox’s The air is just desire with Quatuor Bozzini, alongside a “direct, and powerfully moving” performance of Schoenberg’s Second String Quartet at the 2022 Dartington International Summer School; and a “fearless” performance of Laura Bowler's ground-breaking multimedia chamber piece Distance at Sound Festival in Scotland, Cheltenham Music Festival and Spitalfields Music Festival, which involved Fraser performing live in the UK, alongside Talea Ensemble who were live-streamed from New York.

=== Commissioning ===
Fraser frequently commissions new vocal works, often collaborating closely with the composer. These commissions include:

- Newton Armstrong The Book of the Sediments (2022, voice and tape)
- Nwando Ebizie I birth the moon (2022, voice and tape)
- Martin Smolka All is Ceiled (2022, voice and double bass)
- Anna Zaradny E U P H O R I A O F F U R I E S (2022, voice, double bass and electronics)
- Lara Agar This Unquiet Autumn (2021, voice and piano-keyboard)
- Laurence Crane Natural World (2021, voice and piano-keyboard)
- Pascale Criton Ritournelle pour J&F (2021, voice and double bass)
- Cassandra Miller Tracery (2017-2020, voice and tape)
- Sivan Eldar Heave (2019, solo version for voice and tape)
- Lisa Illean A through-grown earth (2018, voice and tape)
- Andrew Hamilton To The People (2018, voice and percussion)
- Catherine Kontz Tea Break for Juliet (2017, voice and tape)
- Nicholas Peters Scantlebury (2017, voice and tape)
- Eleanor Cully I, as mouth (2015 rev. 2017, voice and percussion)
- Michael Finnissy Andersen-Liederkreis (2016, voice and piano)
- Bernhard Lang The Cold Trip, part 2 (2016, voice and piano/keyboard)
- Matthew Shlomowitz Songs about words and about the pleasure of misery (2012, voice and piano)
- James Weeks Late Moons (2006, voice and ensemble)

=== Premieres ===
Other notable world premieres include:

- Christopher Fox The air is just desire (2022)
- Cassandra Miller Thanksong (2022)
- Gavin Bryars Wittgenstein Fragments (2022)
- Øyvind Torvund Plans for Future Operas (2022)
- Annesley Black tolerance stacks II (2022)
- Pascale Criton Alter (2022)
- Laura Bowler Distance (2021)
- Luke Nickel Steel becomes silk, gravity recast (2021)
- Rebecca Saunders The Mouth (2020)
- Naomi Pinnock I am, I am (2019)
- Frank Denyer Screens (2019)
- Rebecca Saunders O Yes & I (2018)
- Lisa Illean A through-grown earth (2018)
- Lawrence Dunn While we are both (2018)
- John Croft Lost Songs (2017)
- Rebecca Saunders Skin (2016)

=== Teaching ===
Alongside her work on stage, Fraser has delivered masterclasses and taught short courses on contemporary vocal performance or collaborative composition for the Britten-Pears Young Artist Programme, Dartington International Summer School, 'Academie Voix Nouvelles' at Royaumont Abbey, Festival Mixtur, November Music, University of Southampton and Leeds Conservatoire. In 2023 she launched VOICEBOX, an initiative to support singers wanting to specialise in contemporary vocal performance, delivered in partnership with Britten Pears Arts, City, University of London, sound festival (Aberdeen) and Dartington Music.

=== Writing ===
As a writer on contemporary music and performance practice, Fraser has had essays commissioned by Cheltenham Music Festival 2022, MaerzMusik—Festival for Time Issues 2022, Britten Pears Arts 2021 and the Fragility of Sounds lecture series 2021. In 2019 she was granted a Hartley Residency at the University of Southampton, giving a paper on collaboration and leading workshops on the subject. Fraser later revised and presented this paper as a keynote speaker at the CREATIE and Mixed Currents conference-festival 2019 at the Royal Conservatoire Antwerp. During a tour of recitals and lectures in the US in 2017, Fraser was a guest speaker at the University at Buffalo, Northwestern University and Peabody Institute at Johns Hopkins University. Her writing has been published in TEMPO and by Wolke Verlag. From 2013 to 2016, Fraser was Reviews Editor for TEMPO, the Cambridge University Press quarterly journal of new music.

== Discography ==
=== Contemporary music ===
- What of Words and What of Song (NEOS, 2023) - works by Chaya Czernowin, Beat Furrer, Enno Poppe & Rebecca Saunders
- Laurence Crane - Natural World (Another Timbre, 2023)
- John Croft Lost Songs (First Hand Records, 2021)
- My Adventures With The TC Helicon Voicelive 2 (TAKUROKU, 2020) - twenty-two tracks of loops, refrains and laments made by Fraser during lockdown
- Spilled Out from Tangles (HCR, 2020) - works by Lisa Illean, Sivan Eldar, Nomi Epstein & Lawrence Dunn
- Cassandra Miller - Songs About Singing (all that dust, 2019)
- Frank Denyer - The Boundaries of Intimacy (Another Timbre, 2019)
- Milton Babbitt - Philomel (all that dust, 2018)
- Andrew Hamilton - music for people (2014) (NMC Recordings, 2018)
- Bernhard Lang - The Cold Trip, part 2 (Kairos, 2017)
- Rebecca Saunders - Skin (NEOS, 2017)
- Michael Finnissy - Andersen-Liedererkreis (Hat Hut Records, 2016)
- Morton Feldman - Three Voices (Hat Hut Records, 2016) - nominated for a Schallplattenkritik prize.
- Frank Denyer - Whispers (Another Timbre, 2015)

=== Early music ===
- Carlo Gesualdo - Madrigals with EXAUDI (Winter & Winter, 2019)
- William Byrd - Infelix Ego with Collegium Vocale Gent (phi, 2014)
- Carlo Gesualdo - Responsoria 1611 with Collegium Vocale Gent (phi, 2013)
- Tomas Luis de Vitoria - Officium Defunctorum with Collegium Vocale Gent (phi, 2012)
- Orlande de Lassus - Cantiones Sacrae with Collegium Vocale Gent (Harmonia Mundi, 2008)
