= Jasna Veličković =

Serbian composer

Jasna Veličković (Serbian Cyrillic: Јасна Величковић) (born 1974) is a Serbian composer.

== Biography ==
Jasna Veličković was born in Belgrade, 1974.

She completed her Bachelors in composition at the Faculty of Music in Belgrade under Srdjan Hofman. She has been living and working as a composer in the Netherlands since 2001 where she completed a Masters in music at the Royal Conservatory of The Hague under Louis Andriessen, Gilius van Bergeijk and Clarence Barlow with distinction.

Velickovic has written and been performed by various ensembles including Belgrade Philharmonic Orchestra, Belgrade Radio Philharmonic Orchestra, Dutch Radio Kamerorkest conducted by Péter Eötvös, Robot orchestra by Godfried Willem Raes, David Kweksilber's Big Band, Maarten Altena Ensemble, LOOS, 'de Ereprijs', Le Nouvel Ensemble Moderne, Ensemble Aleph, Piano Possibile, pianoduo Post & Mulder, Claron McFadden, Nada Kolundzija, Stephanie Pan, Gośka Isphording, Debora Richards as well by ensembles with specific instrumentation formed for the particular piece.

Her works have been performed at festivals such as Holland Festival, Gaudeamus Music Week, Music Biennale Zagreb, Archipel Festival (Swiss), Time of Music (Finland), Festival Aspekte (Austria), A-devantgarde (Germany), Manca (France), International Review of Composers (Serbia) among others.

Velickovic is co-founder of CHINCH – Initiative for Research and Production of Contemporary Music, “Live” and Visual Arts. Guest speakers included Richard Ayres, Louis Andriessen, Gilius van Bergeijk among others. She is also co-founder of Teorija koja Hoda (Walking Theory).

== Awards ==
- She was the laureate of the 4th International Youth Music Forum in Kiev (1995)
- The first prize at the International Review of Composers in Belgrade (1996)
- Second prize at the International Review of Composers in Belgrade (1997)
- The Josip Slavenski Award in Belgrade (1998)
- Finalist with the orchestra piece at the Dutch Music Days festival (2002)
- IRINO Prize in Tokyo, Japan (2007) with her piece "Strelka" (for two pianos, harp, harpsichord, accordion, cymbal and music saw).

== Sources ==
- Paragrami tela/figure- text by Misko Suvakovic, CENPI-Centar za novo pozoriste i igru, Belgrade 2001
- Music and Networking- text by Vesna Mikic, University of Arts in Belgrade, 2004
- Teatron-text by Jelena Novak, Museum of Theater Art, 2004
- TKH & Think Performance- Museum of Applied Art, 2005
- The LOGBOOK Ensemble Aleph-interview with Makis Solomos, Paris, 2006
- Nutida Musik 3 2007- text by Neimarevic, Mikic Markovic, Stockholm 2007
- Tempo, 61 : 39-60 - text by Donata Premeru, Cambridge University Press 2007
