= Hanna Kulenty =

Polish composer (born 1961)

Hanna Kulenty (born March 18, 1961, in Białystok) is a Polish composer of contemporary classical music. Since 1992, she has worked and lived both in Warsaw (Poland) and in Arnhem (Netherlands).

== Musical education ==
After studying piano at the Karol Szymanowski School of Music in Warsaw from 1976 to 1980, Kulenty studied composition with Włodzimierz Kotoński at the Fryderyk Chopin Music Academy in Warsaw. From 1986 to 1988 she studied composition with Louis Andriessen at the Royal Conservatory in The Hague. In 1984 and 1988 she participated in Darmstadt International Summer Courses for New Music. In 1983 and 1990 she was participant in the International Courses for Young Composers in Kazimierz, organised by the Polish section of the ISCM — where she attended lectures with Iannis Xenakis, Witold Lutosławski, Thomas Kessler and François-Bernard Mâche.

== Main activities ==
From 1989 Kulenty worked as a free-lance composer, and received numerous commissions and scholarships. She has composed 2 operas and 12 works for large orchestra. She has written numerous works for solo instruments and chamber groups. Since 2007 she is also involved in writing music for television plays and for film.

In 1990 she was for one-year guest composer at the German Academic Exchange Service (DAAD) in Berlin. In 1998 she was invited as guest lecturer at three universities around Los Angeles. In 1999/2000 she was composer-in-residence with Het Gelders Orkest in the Netherlands. In November 2000 a portrait concert was organized by Deutschlandfunk in Cologne (released on the CD ‘Arcs & Circles’). She lectured at the Other Minds 10 festival (San Francisco) and at Soundstreams Canada 2005 in Toronto. In 2007 she was guest professor at the ESMUC, Music Academy in Barcelona.

She was a jury member during Munich Biennale in 1995, during the Gaudeamus International Composers Award 2002 in Amsterdam, during the Kazimierz Serocki 9th International Composers’ Competition in Warsaw (2003), during the International New Chamber Opera Competition "Orpheus-Luciano Berio 2003–2004" in Spoleto, and in 2005 and 2007 during the International Competition of Contemporary Chamber Music in Cracow.

== Style and technique of composition ==
"Hanna Kulenty’s music is permeated with images of organic transformation and growth. The intuitive shaping of evolving sound patterns, extended phrases and richly detailed textures in these works results from Kulenty’s original compositional technique which she calls ‘the polyphony of arches’ or ‘arcs’. The works include many layers of simultaneous ‘arches’ which may begin at different points of their trajectories and proceed at different speeds.

Her compositional style has evolved during the years since her dazzling orchestral debut, Ad Unum, a powerful, dissonant, dramatic and well-crafted study of convergence towards musical unity. Since that work, Kulenty's preferred medium has been the symphony orchestra.

Through the 1990s the composer developed an original version of ‘post-minimalist’ style, characterized by a reduction of the number and density of musical layers, in comparison with the earlier, saturated and dramatic style of the ‘polyphony of arches’. She called this style her version of the ‘European trance music’. Kulenty seldom used sudden textural cuts and shifts in this period. Instead, she often structured her compositions as single, powerful arches, slowly evolving in time, gradually increasing their gripping intensity of emotion.

Her penchant for musical drama and intensity of emotion found a suitable expression in her music for stage. The ‘intuitive constructivism’ coupled with a heightened emotional intensity of her music is well-suited for highlighting dramatic situations. Kulenty's mastery of time and her ability to structure her musical material into layers moving inexorably, inevitably towards powerful climaxes brings a symphonic dimension to her other theatrical compositions.

Kulenty's latest compositional technique of the ‘polyphony of time dimensions’ emphasizes the circularity of time and the simultaneity of time-events occurring on different temporal planes."

== Awards ==
In 1985 Kulenty was awarded the second prize of the European Young Composers’ Competition organized in Amsterdam with Ad Unum for orchestra (1985).

In 1987 she was awarded the Stanislaw Wyspianski Award (2nd class).

In the same year she was awarded the second prize by the Young Composers’ Competition of the Polish Composers' Union with Ride for 6 percussionists (1987).

She was also awarded prizes in the Composers’ Competition from the Warsaw branche of the Polish Composers’ Union: Quinto for 2 piano's (1986), first prize; Breathe for string orchestra (1987), first prize;Cannon for violin and piano (1988) third prize; aaa TRE for viola, cello and double bass (1988) second prize 1989.

In 2003 her composition Trumpet Concerto (2002) won the first prize at the 50th International Rostrum of Composers, for which she received the UNESCO Mozart Medal from the International Music Council.

Her compositions Preludium, Postludium and Psalm, for cello and accordion (2007) and String Quartet No. 3 – Tell me about it (2008), were respectively chosen among the ten best Dutch compositions of 2007 and 2008 during the ‘Toonzetters’ contest in Amsterdam.

== About the performances ==
Kulenty's compositions have been premiered at festivals throughout the world, such as the Huddersfield Contemporary Music Festival, Schleswig-Holstein Musik Festival, Munich Biennale, Warsaw Autumn, and Musica Polonica Nova. Her numerous orchestral pieces have been performed by symphony orchestras in the Netherlands (Radio Filharmonisch Orkest), Denmark (Danish National Symphony Orchestra), Poland, and Germany (Radio-Symphonie-Orchester Berlin), with conductors such as David Porcelijn, Antoni Wit, Peter Hirsch, Peter Eötvös, Ingo Metzmacher, Renato Rivolta, and Ronald Zollman. Soloists such as Isabelle van Keulen, Elisabeth Chojnacka, Krzysztof Bąkowski, Marco Blaauw, and Frank Peters have performed her work, as have the Dutch ensemble De Ereprijs, who commissioned her to write pieces on several occasions. In 2008 the Kronos Quartet performed her String Quartet No. 4. Since the success of her opera The Mother of Black-Winged Dreams at the Munich Biennale 1996 she is considered "one of the leading figures on the Polish composers’ scene".

Kulenty's compositions are published by Donemus (part of Music Center the Netherlands) in Amsterdam and by PWM Edition in Cracow.

== List of works (by genre) ==
=== Operas and other stage works ===
- Hoffmanniana (2003) – opera in two acts
- The Mother of Black-Winged Dreams (1995) – opera in one act
- Przypowieść o ziarnie [Parable on grain] (1985) – chamber opera / monodrama
- Island (2006) – stage work for trumpet solo, voice, ensemble and tape
- Lost & Found twenty-five (2008) – music-dance theater for ensemble and tape

=== Symphony orchestra and chamber orchestra ===
- Ad unum (1985) – symphony orchestra
- Breathe (1987) – chamber orchestra
- Certus (1997) – chamber orchestra
- Part One (1998) – symphony orchestra
- Passacaglia (1992) – chamber orchestra
- Piano Concerto No. 2 (1991) – piano, symphony orchestra
- Piano Concerto No. 3 (2003) – piano, symphony orchestra
- Quatro (1986) – chamber orchestra
- Trigon (1989) – chamber orchestra
- Sinequan Forte A (1994) – solo amplified cello with delay, symphony orchestra
- Sinequan Forte B (1994) solo amplified cello with delay, chamber orchestra
- Symphony No. 1 (1986) – symphony orchestra
- Symphony No. 2 (1987) – symphony orchestra, mixed choir
- Symphony No. 3 (2000) – symphony orchestra
- Trumpet Concerto (2002) – trumpet, symphony orchestra
- Violin Concerto No. 1 (1993) – violin, symphony orchestra
- Violin Concerto No. 2 (1996) – violin, symphony orchestra

=== Large ensemble ===
- A few minutes for Ereprijs (1992) – ensemble
- Air (1991) – ensemble
- Elfen (1997) – ballet music for ensemble
- Flute Concerto no. 1 (2001) – flute (amplified, delay) and chamber orchestra
- Going Up 2 (1995) – ensemble
- Mezzo Tango (2004) – brass band
- Mezzo Tango 2 (2005) – ensemble
- Piano Concerto No. 1 (1990) – piano, ensemble
- Perpetuus (1989) – ensemble
- Postcard from Europe (2004) – ensemble
- Violin Concerto No. 1 (1992) – violin, ensemble

=== Chamber groups ===
- Arcus (1988) – three percussionists
- aaa TRE (1988) – viola, cello, double bass
- A Cradle Song (1993) – violin, cello, piano
- A Fourth Circle (1994) – violin (or viola/cello) and piano
- A Sixth Circle (1995) – trumpet, piano
- Asjaawaa (2001) – mezzo-soprano, flute, harp, piano, percussion, electronics
- Blattinus (1996) – saxophone quartet
- Brass No. 2 (2005) – for horn and trumpet
- Cannon (1988) – violin, piano
- Crossing Lines (2001) – violin, clarinet, piano
- Decimo (2000) – for choir, six voices
- Going Up 1 (1995) – violin, double bass
- Kisses & Crosses (2007) – for piano and percussion
- Lysanxia (1994) – gamelan, tape
- MM-blues (1999) – two piano's and two percussions
- Preludium, Postludium and Psalm (2007) – for cello and accordion
- Quinto (1986) – two pianos
- Rainbow 3 (2003) – flute, bass clarinet, piano
- Rapidus (1998) – saxophone quartet
- Ride (1987) – six percussionists
- Run (2004) – flute and piano
- Sierra (1996) – violin, cello
- Stretto (1998) – flute, clarinet, cello, guitar
- String Quartet no. 1 (1984)
- String Quartet No. 2 (1990)
- String Quartet No. 3 – Tell me about it (2007)
- String Quartet No. 4 (A Cradle Song) (2007)
- Tap-Blow-Dance4* (2020) 2 bass clarinets, violoncello, vibraphone [12']
- Sugar-Fela Tango (2009) – for piano and four instruments
- Tell me about it 1 (2006) – for clarinet, cello, trombone and piano
- Tell me about it 2 (2006) – for bass clarinet, cello, trombone and contra bas
- Waiting for… (1997) – voice, piano

=== Solo instruments ===
- Arci (1986) – percussion solo
- A Fifth Circle (1994) – alto flute with delay
- A Third Circle (1996) – piano solo
- Brass No. 1 (2004) – trumpet solo
- Brass No. 2 (2004) – horn and trumpet
- Brass No. 3 (2005) – horn solo or trumpet solo
- Brass No. 4 (2007) – tuba solo
- Cadenza (1992) – violin solo with delay
- Drive Blues (2000) – piano solo
- E for E (1991) – harpsichord solo
- Harmonium (1999) – harmonium solo
- One by One (1988) – marimba solo
- Preludium and Psalm (2007) – harmonium solo or another keyboard instrument
- Sesto (1985) – piano solo
- Sinequan (1993) – cello solo with optional delay
- Sinequan (rev. 1993) – cello solo with delay
- Still Life with a Cello (1993) – cello solo
- Still Life with a Violin (1985) – violin solo
- Three Minutes for the Double Bass (1983) – double bass solo

=== Electroacoustic music ===
- Prośba o Słońce [Request for the Sun] (1984) – electroacoustic tape
- Souvenir from a Sanatorium (1988) – computer music

== See also ==
- Polish composers
- Music of Poland
- List of Poles
- List of 20th century classical composers by birth date
