= Marco Blaauw =

Dutch trumpeter

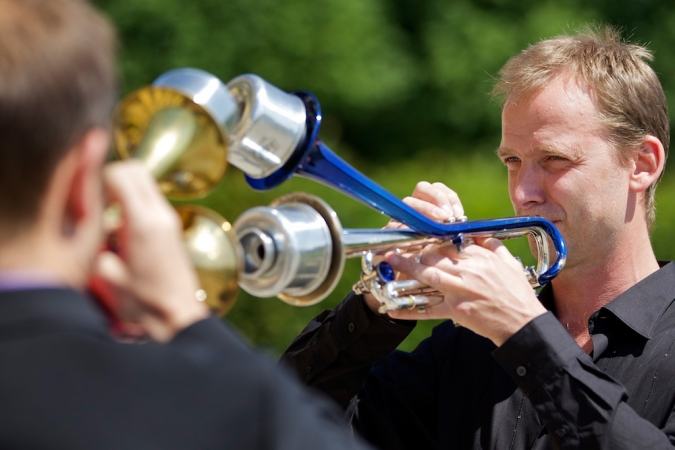
Marco Blaauw with his double bell trumpet

Marco Blaauw is a Dutch trumpet soloist known for his work in the field of new music and with Cologne-based contemporary music group Ensemble Musikfabrik. He plays a double bell trumpet, an invention that has allowed for numerous new compositions for trumpet, including those by Ernst von Siemens Music Prize winner, Rebecca Saunders. Blaauw is a consistent faculty member at the Darmstadt Summer Course, the Stockhausen Courses Kürten, the Lucerne Festival, and the Chosen Vale International Trumpet Seminar.

== Biography ==
Blaauw was born September 23, 1965, in Lichtenvoorde, the Netherlands, and began playing trumpet at a young age in the local band. As a young student, Blaauw attended the Sweelinck Conservatorium in Amsterdam and later studied with Pierre Thibaud and Markus Stockhausen.

Blaauw has an extensive solo career, particularly in the contemporary, new, and improvised music scenes. He has collaborated on and premiered several pieces for trumpet solo and ensemble and is well known for his work with composer Karlheinz Stockhausen. Marco was also a founding member of contemporary music group Ensemble Musikfabrik in Cologne, Germany, and appears on several recordings with the ensemble.

Blaauw has performed solo with numerous orchestras and new music ensembles, including the Dutch Radio Symphony Orchestra, the National Polish Radio Symphony Orchestra, WDR Symphony Orchestra Cologne, the Deutsche Oper Berlin, Klangforum Wien, London Sinfonietta, and Asko|Schönberg Ensemble. He has also performed at festivals such as Musikfest Berlin, Donaueschinger Musiktage, Huddersfield Contemporary Music Festival, the Lucerne Festival, and more.

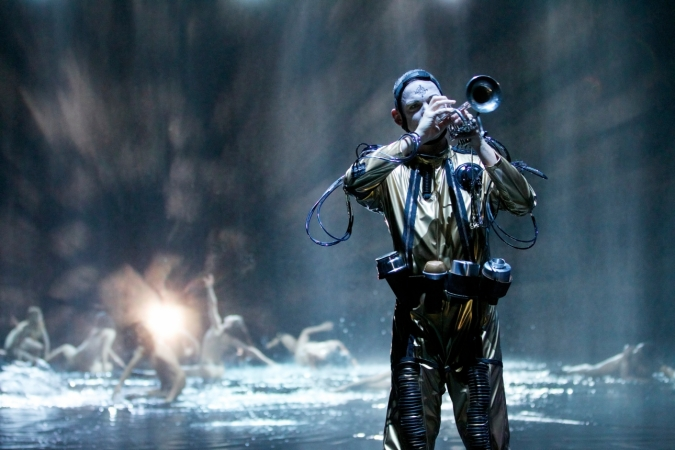
Marco Blaauw performing as MICHAEL in Stockhausen's SUNDAY from LIGHT

The focus of Marco Blaauw's work is the further development of the trumpet, its technique, and its repertoire, often collaborating on works with both established and younger composers. Many works have been written for Blaauw or have been inspired by his playing, including ones made by Peter Eötvös, Rebecca Saunders, Richard Ayres, Isabel Mundry, Hanna Kulenty, Georg Friedrich Haas, John Zorn, and Wolfgang Rihm.

=== Double bell trumpet ===
Marco Blaauw plays a double bell trumpet. The first model was made by Dieter Gaertner in Düren, Germany, with whom Blaauw had previously worked on various C trumpets. This instrument inspired composer Péter Eötvös to write the first piece for the instrument – "Snatches of a Conversation" – which Blaauw premiered and recorded. In the relatively short life of the double bell trumpet, Marco Blaauw has generated a huge amount of new repertoire for the instrument and helped spearhead development of other double bell brass instruments (now used by Ensemble Musikfabrik).

Since the first iteration of the double bell trumpet built by Gaertner, Blaauw has developed a close working relation with Hub van Laar of Van Laar Trumpets and Flugelhorns in Margraten, the Netherlands. Along with B-flat, C, and piccolo trumpets, Van Laar has also made the quarter-tone flugelhorn (notable for its use in Karlheinz Stockhausen's PIETÀ from DIENSTAG aus LICHT) and the double bell trumpet that Blaauw now plays.

=== Collaborations and projects ===
Marco Blaauw worked in close collaboration with German composer Karlheinz Stockhausen for 17 years. Beginning in 1998, Marco Blaauw worked intensely with Karlheinz Stockhausen and premiered solo roles in scenes of the opera cycle LICHT. In August 2008, he presented the premiere of "HARMONIES for trumpet" from KLANG for BBC Radio 3 in the Royal Albert Hall. Blaauw has since performed all major works for trumpet by Stockhausen and can be heard on several recordings of the Stockhausen Verlag (see discography).

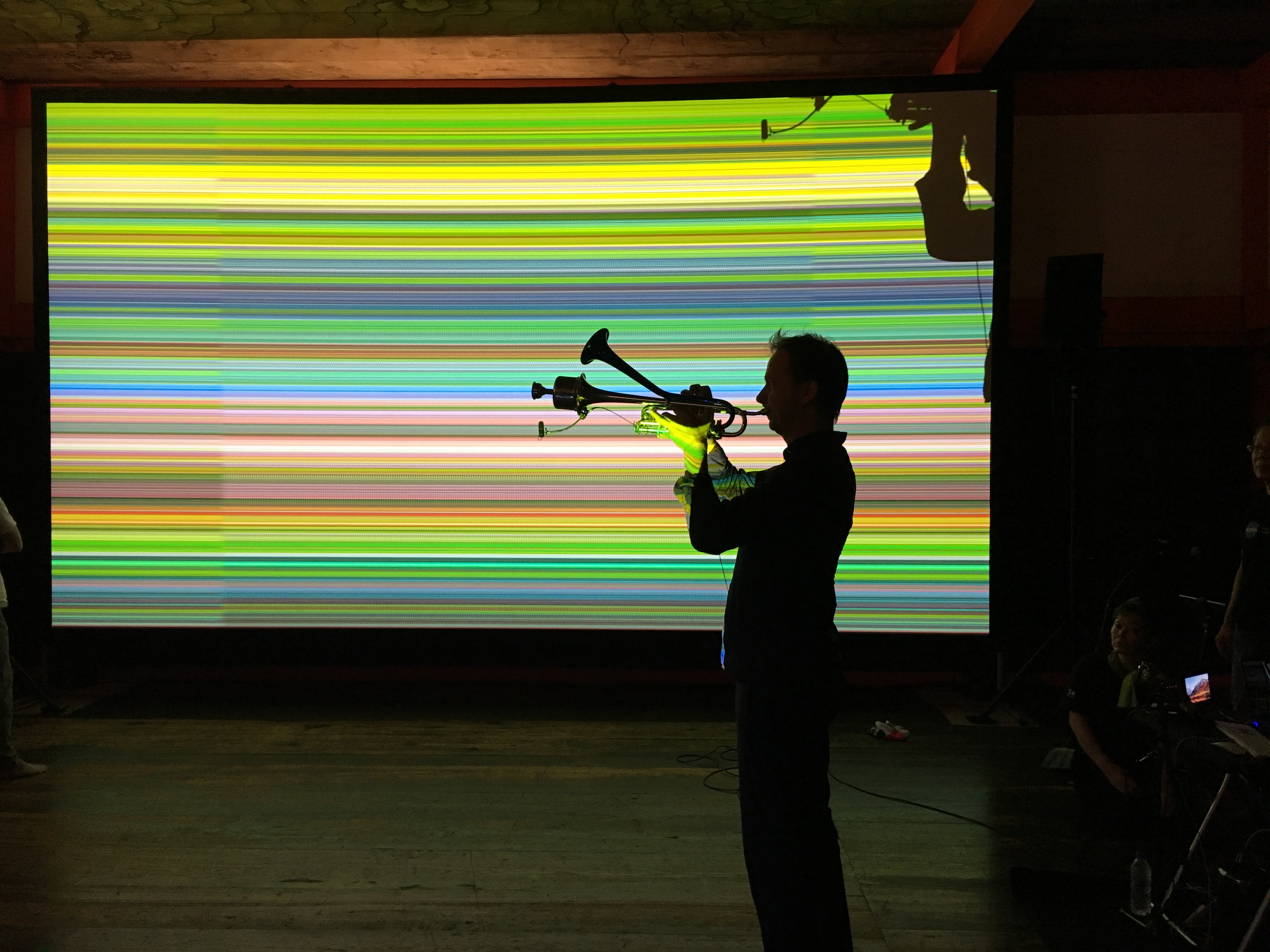
Marco Blaauw performing "Moving Picture" in Kyoto

In 2015, Blaauw started working with La Monte Young on “the Second Dream of the High Tension Line Stepdown Transformer" for a concert in the Chelsea Dream House, NYC, and went on to perform to critical acclaim in Warsaw, Huddersfield, Paris, Oslo, Amsterdam, Krems, Cologne, and Polling. This project has since grown into the Monochrome Project – an ensemble of 8 trumpet players – which maintains an active schedule of premieres, including works by Anthony Braxton.

Blaauw has also worked in close collaboration with famous German painter Gerhard Richter. Blaauw, with Ensemble Musikfabrik, premiered "Richter's Patterns" by composer Marcus Schmickler at the Kölner Philharmonie in 2016, and Blaauw has continued a close working relationship with the artist since. In 2019, Blaauw played for the premiere of Richter's "Moving Picture 946-3" at the Kiyomizu-dera Temple in Kyoto, Japan. The film was created in collaboration with Corinna Belz (filmmaker) with score for solo trumpet and electronics by Rebecca Saunders and has since also been a featured event at Musikfest Berlin 2020.

Recently, Blaauw has been working on the Global Breath project working to record and archive iconographic sounds, as well as connect pioneering trumpet players worldwide. The project will host a conference in March 2021.

=== Teaching ===
Marco Blaauw served on the faculty of the Masters aus LICHT program at the Koninklijk Conservatorium in The Hague, the Netherlands from 2017 until 2019. This one-time masters program served to instruct students in the performance of the music of Karlheinz Stockhausen and prepare them to play solo roles in the aus LICHT production of the Dutch National Opera and 2019 Holland Festival.

Marco Blaauw has been a teacher at the Darmstadt Summer Course since 2014 and head of the Brass Academy since 2016. He also currently leads the trumpet class at the Stockhausen Courses Kurten and has served as a faculty member of the Chosen Vale International Trumpet Seminar since 2008. In 2018, Blaauw and the Musikfabrik brass soloists created the Ensemble Musikfabrik Brass Academy, and they have since hosted the course at the Musikfabrik studios every summer with the exception of 2020, when the academy took place online due to the coronavirus pandemic.

=== Honors and awards ===
In 2003 Marco Blaauw was awarded the Orpheus Prize for his performance of Hanna Kulenty's Trumpet Concerto during the Warsaw Autumn Festival. In 2008 he received the Karel de Grote-award from the city of Nijmegen. Blaauw's sixth solo CD, Angels, was awarded the Preis der Deutschen Schallplattenkritik 2014. As a composer, Blaauw was awarded the 2016 Karl Sczuka Prize for his first radio play, deathangel. Blaauw also gave the laudation speech in honor of Rebecca Saunders for her Ernst von Siemens Music Prize award.

== Discography ==
=== As featured artist ===
- 2005 Blaauw (BVHAAST)
- 2006 HOT (BVHAAST)
- 2008 Improvisation, with Gijsbrecht Roye (World Edition)
- 2010 Play Robot Dream, with Yannis Kyriakides (Unsounds)
- 2011 Blue Dog (Wergo)
- 2014 Angels (Wergo)

=== Appearances ===
- 1993 Arrows in Time, by Rajesh Mehta Collective (New Limits); Performing Rajesh Mehta's Third Kalpa for 4 trumpets
- 1995 Mauricio Kagel 7: Nah und Fern, by Mauricio Kagel (Montaigne)
- 1996 Music + Practice, by Ives Ensemble (Donemus); Performing Richard Ayres' No. 5 Untitled for trumpet and piano
- 1997 Bassetsu-Trio, by Karlheinz Stockhausen (Stockhausen Verlag)
- 1997 Conquest of Melody, by Marcus Weiss (Hat Hut); Performing Stefan Wolpe's Quartet for trumpet, tenor saxophone, piano and percussion
- 1999 Madrigale, by Ives Ensemble (Hat Hut); Performing Aldo Clementi's Studi for violin, trumpet and piano
- 2000 Counterpoise, by Marcus Weiss, Trio Accanto, XASAX (Hat Hut); Performing Wolpe's Quartet & John Carisi's “Counterpoise No 1” for trumpet, baritone sax, percussion and piano
- 2000 James Tenney Forms 1-4, by musikFabrik (Hat Hut); Performing Stefan Wolpe's Piece for Trumpet and 7 Instruments
- 2002 Dutch New Music, by Concertzender Live 02 (Muziekgroep Nederland); Performing Christina Viola Oorebeek's Fulgura Frango for trumpet/piccolo/flugel and ensemble
- 2002 LICHT-BILDER, by Karlheinz Stockhausen (Stockhausen Verlag)
- 2001 Cornelius Cardew, Chamber Music 1955–1964, by Apartment House (Matchless Recordings); Performing Cornelius Cardew's Three Rhythmic Pieces for Trumpet and Piano
- 2001 Arcs & Circles – Portrait Concert of Hanna Kulenty, by Hanna Kulenty (Frau Musica); Performing A Sixth Circle for trumpet and piano
- 2003 Warsaw Autumn 2003, no. 1, by Sinfonia Varsovia under Renato Rivolta; Performing Hanna Kulenty's Trumpet Concerto
- 2003 ON Turntable Jazz, by Produciehuis Oost Nederland
- 2003 Michaels Ruf, Quitt, and Trumpetent, by Karlheinz Stockhausen (Stockhausen Verlag)
- 2004 Hoch-Zeiten, by Karlheinz Stockhausen (Stockhausen Verlag)
- 2004 Snatches, by Péter Eötvös (BMC); Performing Snatches of a Conversation for double-bell trumpet, speaker and ensemble with Ensemble Musikfabrik
- 2004 Vision, by Karlheinz Stockhausen (Stockhausen Verlag)
- 2005 Soundstreams Canada, Performing world première of Hanna Kulenty's Brass No. 1 for double bell trumpet
- 2005 fiato coninuo 1,2,3,4,5, by Bojidar Spassov (Wergo); Performing Fiato Coninuo IV for trumpet and tape
- 2007 Dokumentation Wittener Tage für neue Kammermusik 2007, 20. Bis 22. April, by Salome Kammer, Stimme, and WDR Rundfunkchor Köln under Rupert Huber; Performing Isabel Mundry's gesichtet, gesichelt for voice, trumpet and 3 choirs
- 2007 50th Warsaw Autumn, CD no8, by Various Artists; Performing Yannis Kyriakides' “Dog Song” (Cerberus serenades Orpheus)
- 2008 Witten 2008 Tage für neue Kammermusik; Performing Rebecca Saunders' Company for 5 soloists
- 2008 Musik in Deutschland 1955-2000, by Musikfabrik (Deutsche Musikrat); Performing Rebecca Saunders' Behind the Velvet Curtain & Richard Ayres' No 31 noncerto for trumpet and ensemble
- 2008 Richard Ayres Portrait CD, by Musikfabrik (BMC); Performing Richard Ayres' No 31 and No. 5 Untitled
- 2008 Stirrings Still, by Musikfabrik (Wergo); Performing Rebecca Saunders' Blaauw for double bell trumpet
- 2009 Speech Songs, by Musikfabrik (Wergo)
- 2009 Antichamber, by Yannis Kyriakides; Performing “Dog Song” (Cerberus serenades Orpheus)
- 2009 Gleichzeit – Eine Musikalische Zeitreise, by Junge Deutsche Philharmonie under Susanna Mälkki; Performing Bernd Alois Zimmermann's Nobody Knows the Trouble I See
- 2010 Hoffnung und Glanz, by Karlheinz Stockhausen; playing "GLANZ" with members of Ensemble Musikfabrik (Stockhausen Verlag)
- 2010 Visible Traces; with Ensemble Musikfabrik (Wergo)
- 2010 Treue und Erwachen, by Karlheinz Stockhausen; playing "AWAKENING" with members of Ensemble Musikfabrik (Stockhausen Verlag)
- 2010 NONcertos and Others, by Richard Ayres; playing "No. 31: NONcerto for Trumpet" with Ensemble Musikfabrik (NMC)
- 2010 Harmonien und Schönheit, by Karlheinz Stockhausen (Stockhausen Verlag)
- 2010 Edition Musikfabrik vol. 3 – From Heaven to Hell, with Ensemble Musikfabrik (Wergo)
- 2010 Edition Musikfabrik vol. 5 – Coronation; playing "Cinnabar" by Rebecca Saunders (Wergo)
- 2011 Donaueschinger Musiktage 2011; playing "'Séraphin' – Symphonie" by Wolfgang Rihm with Ensemble Musikfabrik (NEOS)
- 2012 Maria de Alvear – Flores; playing "Flores" with Ensemble Musikfabrik (World Edition)
- 2013 Michael's Reise um die Erde, by Karlheinz Stockhausen; with Peter Rundel, Nicola Jurgensen, and Ensemble MusikFabrik (Wergo)
- 2013 Tongue of the Invisible, by Liza Lim; with Ensemble Musikfabrik (Wergo)
- 2014 Malika Kishino – Irisation, playing "Sensitive Chaos" with Ensemble Musikfabrik (Wergo)
- 2014 Edition Musikfabrik vol. 8 – Graffiti; playing "...Miramondo Multiplo..." by Olga Neuwirth with Ensemble Musikfabrik (Wergo)
- 2014 György Ligeti – Cello Concerto, Mysteries of the Macabre, Piano Concerto; performing "Mysteries of the Macabre", with PluralEnsemble and Fabian Panisello (NEOS)
- 2017 Milica Djordjevic; playing "Phosphorescence" (Wergo)
- 2017 Edition Musikfabrik vol. 12 – Silence; with Ensemble Musikfabrik (Wergo)
- 2018 Edition Musikfabrik vol. 13 – Crossings; with Ensemble Musikfabrik (Wergo)
- 2019 Oxana Omelchuk, with Ensemble Musikfabrik (Wergo)
- 2019 Substratum, by Sam Hayden; with Ensemble Musikfabrik (Nmc)
- 2019 A Selection of Instrumental Pieces by Czech Composers; with Ensemble Musikfabrik (Czech music Information Center)
- 2019 Edition Musikfabrik vol. 16 – Fall; with Ensemble Musikfabrik (Wergo)
- 2020 Richters Patterns, by Marcus Schmickler; with Ensemble Musikfabrik (Tochnit Aleph)
