= Makis Solomos =

Franco-Greek musicologist (born 1962)

- Born: 1962 (age 63–64); Athens, Greece
- Education: Paris-Sorbonne University
- Occupation: Musicologist

Makis Solomos (born 1962) is a Franco-Greek musicologist. He specializes in contemporary music, particularly the musical works of Iannis Xenakis and Theodor W. Adorno.

In 2005, Solomos co-founded the magazine Filigrane, which aimed to broaden the field of musicology. His research focuses on issues related to sound ecology and decay.

== Biography ==
Solomos was born in Athens, Greece, in 1962. Early in his life, he was interned in the Gyaros concentration camp alongside his mother. Following their time in the concentration camp, his family was exiled to France. Solomos has lived in Paris since 1980. He studied musical composition with Yoshihisa Taira and Sergio Ortega, and musicology at the Paris-Sorbonne University. He taught at the University of Montpellier Paul Valéry until 2010. He is currently a professor at the Paris 8 University Vincennes-Saint-Denis and a junior member of the Institut universitaire de France.

== Research areas ==
Solomos' research encompasses a range of analytical, historical and hermeneutic approaches. While much of his work has focused on Iannis Xenakis, he has also written about composers such as Webern, Varèse, Boulez, Criton, Vaggione, and Di Scipio. Solomos' genres of interest include spectral music, electronic music, and aspects of popular music. He also addresses aesthetic questions informed by the philosophical writings of Adorno.

Adopting a modernist perspective, Solomos engages with contemporary music aesthetics, particularly those associated with neoclassicism and postmodernism. He is a critic of historicism, challenging the particular the notion of a linear musical evolution centered exclusively on canonical composers. In contrast, he argues for a more pluralistic understanding of musical development as a complex interplay of diverse aesthetics and conceptions.

In his recent work, Solomos has explored topics such as the emergence of sound as a central musical parameter, sound ecology, and the concept of decay in contemporary music.

== Bibliography ==
- Le devenir du matériau musical au XXe siècle, in SOULEZ Antonia, SCHMITZ François, SEBESTIK Jan (ed)., Musique, rationalité, langage: L'harmonie, du monde au matériau, Cahiers de philosophie du langage (No 3), Paris, L’Harmattan, 1998; (pp.137–151)
- Notes sur la spatialisation de la musique et l'émergence du son, in GENEVOIS Hugues, ORLAREY Yann (ed)., Le son et l'espace, Lyon, Aléas, 1998 (pp. 105–125).(Musique et Sciences).
- Schaeffer phénoménologue, in Ouïr, entendre, écouter, comprendre après Schaeffer, Paris, Buchet-Chastel / INA, 1999, (pp. 53–68) (Bibliothèque de Recherche Musicale).
- Le ‘Savant’ et le ‘Populaire‘, le postmodernisme et la mondialisation, in Musurgia, vol. IX/1, Le Savant et le Populaire, 2002.
- Analyse et idéologie chez Xenakis, in BARDEZ Jean-Michel (ed). Analyse et création musicales, Colloque (1995, Montpellier), Paris, L’Harmattan, 2001, (pp.87–100) (Musique et Musicologie).
- Du projet bartokien au son: L’évolution du jeune Xenakis, in SOLOMOS, Makis (ed.), Présences de Iannis Xenakis, colloque (1998, Paris), Paris, CDMC, 2001.
- De la musique contemporaine à la société, in Filigrane, No 1, Musicologies?, 2005, (pp.49–61)
- Notes pour une comparaison des paradigmes technologiques des musiques électroniques savantes et populaires, in BARBANTI Roberto, LYNCH Enrique, PARDO Carmen, SOLOMOS Makis (ed.), Musiques, arts et technologies: Pour une approche critique, symposium (2000, Montpellier, Barcelone), Paris, L’Harmattan, 2004, (pp.281–290) (Musique Philosophie).
- Iannis Xenakis, Mercues, PO Editions, 1996; (updated in 2004)
- Formel / Informel in SOLOMOS, Makis, SOULEZ, Antonia, VAGGIONE, Horacio, Formel Informel: Musique – Philosophie, Paris, L’Harmattan, 2003. His article De l'apollinien et du dionysiaque dans les écrits de Xenakis can be found in SOLOMOS, Makis, SOULEZ, Antonia, VAGGIONE, Horacio, Formel Informel: Musique – Philosophie, Paris, L’Harmattan, 2003, (pp. 49–90) (Musique Philosophie).
- L’espace : musique-philosophie (with Jean-Marc Chouvel: Paris, l’Harmattan, 1998),
- La métaphore lumineuse. Xenakis-Grisey (Paris, l’Harmattan, 2003)
- Musiques, arts, technologies. Pour une approche critique / Music, arts and technologies. Towards a critical approach / Musicas, artes y tecnologías. Por una aproximacion critica (avec Roberto Barbanti et Carmen Pardo: Paris, l’Harmattan, 2004)
- Horacio Vaggione: Composition theory (Contemporary Music Review vol 24 part 4+5)
- Makis Solomos(éd), Espaces composables: essais sur la musique et la pensée musicale d'Horacio Vaggione, Paris, L'Harmattan, 2007, ISBN 978-2-296-02832-6 (ouvrage reprenant en grande partie en version française les textes de "Horacio Vaggione: Composition theory)
- Rythme, temps et émergence in Rythmes de l'homme, rythmes du monde, Séminaire de l'École normale supérieure de la rue d'Ulm 2006-2008, under the direction of Christian Doumet and Aliocha Wald Lasowski, Éditions Hermann, 2010
