= Frank Denyer =

English composer (born 1943)

Frank Denyer (born 12 April 1943) is an English composer. His music uses a combination of conventional instruments and new, unusual, and structurally modified instruments. Partly due to his studies of non-Western music, much of Denyer's music is microtonal.

== Biography ==
Frank Denyer was born in London on 12 April 1943. He was a chorister at Canterbury Cathedral and later studied at the Guildhall School of Music and Drama in London. In 1967, he formed the ensemble Mouth of Hermes, which for a number of years performed new and experimental music across the United Kingdom, western Europe and Scandinavia.

He worked as a lecturer in Composition and 20th Century Studies at Hornsey College of Art. In 1973 he appeared as composer and performer at the Festival d'Orléans in France. In 1974, Denyer left the United Kingdom to undertake ethnomusicological fieldwork in West Asia and northern India. He also taught at the National Institute of Design in Ahmedabad during this period.

Returning to England in 1981 he joined Dartington College of Arts in Devon where he taught composition until 2010. In 1992, as both pianist and composer, he joined the Barton Workshop in Amsterdam, an ensemble created by James Fulkerson and dedicated to the performance of new and experimental music. The group played in Europe, the United States, Scandinavia and far Eastern countries and made many CD recordings.

His recordings of the solo piano music and ensemble works of Morton Feldman, Galina Ustvolskaya, Christian Wolff, John Cage, Jerry Hunt, James Tenney, Alvin Lucier and others have met with wide acclaim. Denyer's music has remained resolutely independent of musical fashion. An early interest in melody in the 1970s has remained a feature of his work. His music shows an extraordinary ear for timbre, and for novel combinations of acoustic sounds.

In 2012 he was a featured composer in Tectonics Festival, Reykjavík, Iceland. That year he also appeared as pianist in the Promenade Concerts, London. The following year saw the première of his work The Colours of Jellyfish for dispersed symphony orchestra, played by the BBC Scottish Orchestra conducted by Ilan Volkov at the Tectonics Festival, Glasgow.

== Musical style and practice ==
Denyer's music is associated with linear microtonality and unconventional approaches to instrumentation, the precise physical placement of musicians, both on-stage and off-stage, in the auditorium or outside. In many of his scores there are both seen and unseen musicians. There is also a persistent use of non-musical sounds, such as knocking sounds that recur throughout his genre. His compositions range from chamber works to larger-scale ensemble pieces, and all his scores are meticulously notated. He has particular musical interest in memory, linearity, and colour.

== Compositions for shakuhachi ==
Though not a shakuhachi player himself, Denyer has collaborated with Yoshikazu Iwamoto to write pieces for the instrument, including:

- After the Rain
- Wheat
- The Tender Sadness of Tyrants as They Dance
- Stalks
- Winged Play
- Unnamed

== Discography ==
- Silenced Voices. Mode, 2008 (includes Woman, Viola and Crow; Two Beacons; Ghosts Again; Tentative Thoughts, Silenced Voices )
- Music for Shakuhachi. Another Timbre, 2007 (includes On, on - it must be so; Quite White; Wheat; Unnamed)
- Faint Traces. Mode, 2005 (includes Out of the Shattered Shadows 1; Out of the Shattered Shadows 2; Faint Traces; Music for Two Performers; Play; Passages)
- Fired City. Tzadik, 2002 (includes Towards the Darkness; Beneath the Fired City; Quick, Quick, the Tamberan is Coming; The Hanged Fiddler; Resonances of Ancient Sins; Prison Song)
- Finding Refuge in the Remains. Etcetera, 1998 (includes Finding Refuge in the Remains; Quartet; Frog; Archeology; Contained in a Strange Garden; The Tender Sadness of Tyrants as They Dance)
- The Contrabass Saxophone. Earup, 1996 (includes Resonances of Ancient Sins)
- Konink & Andriessen: Notes 94. Walpurgis, 1994 (includes Beneath the Fired City)
- A Monkey's Paw. Continuum, 1991 (includes Stalks; After the Rain; A Fragile Thread; A Monkey's Paw; Winged Play)
- Wheat: The Music of Frank Denyer. Orchid Records, 1984 (includes On, On, it must be so; I Await the Sea’s Red Hibiscus; Wheat; Quick, Quick, the Tamberan is Coming; Quite White; Voices)

== Writings and interviews ==
- Interview with Frank Denyer (2007) by Dan Warburton in Paris Transatlantic Magazine
- Denyer, Frank (ed.) & Landy, Leigh (ed.). Leaving the Twentieth Century: Ideas & Visions of New Musics. Harwood Academic Pub., 1997. ISBN 90-5702-104-8.
- Denyer, Frank. Finding a Voice in an Age of Migration (1994) in Contemporary Music Review, 1996, vol. 15, nos 3–4.
- Denyer, Frank. The Shakuhachi and the Contemporary Music Instrumentarium: a Personal View (1991) in Contemporary Music Review, 1994, vol. 6, no. 2.
