= James Weeks (composer) =

British composer, conductor and teacher of composition

Dr James Weeks (born 1978) is a British composer, conductor and teacher of composition.

== Career ==
Weeks was educated at the University of Cambridge, before studying a Ph.D in Composition under Michael Finnissy at the University of Southampton. His works have been performed by internationally renowned ensembles and soloists such as London Sinfonietta, Apartment House, Quatuor Bozzini, Alison Balsom, EXAUDI, Morgan/Dullea, Wandelweiser, New London Chamber Choir, Uroboros Ensemble, Endymion, Anton Lukoszevieze and Christopher Redgate.

Weeks is also well known for his work with EXAUDI, which he co-founded with the soprano Juliet Fraser in 2002.

As well as a composer and conductor, Weeks is also an active writer on classical music, working with the Guardian, Tempo and the BBC.

He is currently assistant professor in music at Durham University, previously head of composition at the Guildhall School of Music and Drama.

== Works ==
=== One performer ===
- The World in tune solo soprano (2013)
- Narrow Path solo flute (2013)
- Nakedness solo soprano (2012)
- Sixty Notes for Anna solo cello (2010)
- Digger solo guitar (2010)
- Sky solo clarinet with electronics (2010)
- Burnham Air solo oboe d’amore (2008/9)
- Sixty Notes for Mike solo horn (2007)
- Tide solo cello (2007)
- Complainte solo soprano/mezzo (2007)
- Matsushima solo (or multiple) piano(s) (2005)
- Capricho solo violin (2003)
- Siciliano solo violin (2003)
- Two Perscriptions solo piano (2002)

=== Two performers ===
- Signs of Occupation speaking voice, clarinet (2014)
- Softest Numbers violin, piano (2014)
- A Toy violin, piano (2011)
- Sixty Notes horn, cello (2007-)
- Wie soll ich meine Seele halten violin, piano (2006/9)
- Sacred Muses trumpet, organ (2005)
- Amor de lonh soprano, harpsichord (2002)

=== Instrumental ensembles ===
- Joy 2 violins, percussion (2016)
- Cornish String Music any orchestral string instruments (2015)
- Walled Garden 2 alto flutes, bass flute, violin, viola, cello (2015)
- Olympic Frieze any pitched instruments (2014)
- common ground violin, viola, cello (2014)
- Looping Busker Music violin, clarinet, guitar, accordion, tape (2013)
- Three Trios violin, cello, piano, tape (2010–11)
- Fanfare-Canon 6 trumpets (2010)
- String Quartet (to Alberto Caeiro) string quartet (2010)
- TIDE oboe d’amore, clarinet, cello, electronics (2007–10)
- The Nunhead Harmony clarinet, violin, viola, double bass (2009)
- The Peckham Harmony mixed ensemble (2009)
- The Lewisham Harmony violin, viola, cello, piano (2008)
- The Catford Harmony mixed ensemble (2008)
- Come Away soprano, violin, cello, piano (2008)
- New Day solo piano and mixed ensemble (2006)
- Stacking, Weaving, Building, Joining any pitched instruments (2006)
- Honey Celebration violin, cello, piano (2005)
- Matsushima multiple (or solo) piano(s) (2005)
- Schilderkonst mixed ensemble, string quartet, solo piano (2003-4)

=== Vocal ensembles and choirs ===
- Old English Apple Cultivars 4 upper or lower voices (2015)
- A tear mixed voices, organ (2014)
- Radical Road voices with stones (2014)
- mural one or more vocal quartets SATB (2012–13)
- Freehand Etude three performers drawing and vocalising (2012)
- Inscription SATB soli, string quartet (2011)
- The Freedom of the Earth mixed voices, ensemble (2011)
- Glossa ATB choir (2010)
- Orlando Tenebrae SATB choir (2010)
- Mala punica SSAATTBB soli (2008-9)
- Fantastic Alarms of the Shaking Luminances mixed voices and instruments (2007)
- Hototogisu children’s choir, piano duo (2007)
- The Open Consort mixed voices and instruments (2005)
- Liebeslied als Geige SATB soli (2005)
- Spanish Ladies unison male voices, 2 clarinets, cymbal, piano (2004)
- Sint lumbi SATB choir (2004)
- Selbstbildnis als Laute SATB soli (2003)
