= Horacio Vaggione =

Argentinian musician (born 1943)

Horacio Vaggione (born 21 January 1943) is an Argentine composer of electroacoustic and instrumental music who specializes in micromontage, granular synthesis, and microsound and whose pieces are often scored for performers and computers (mixed music).

== Biography ==
He studied composition at the National University of Córdoba (1958–1961) and privately in Buenos Aires with Juan Carlos Paz (1960–1963), then at the University of Illinois with Lejaren Hiller and Herbert Brün (1966) where he first gained exposure and access to computers. In 1983 he received a Doctorate in Musicology at the University of Paris VIII (thesis director: Prof. Daniel Charles).

Vaggione was born in Córdoba, Argentina, but has lived in Europe since 1969. While in Argentina he was a co-founder of the Experimental Music Center (CME) of the National University of Cordoba (1965–1968), and co-organizer of the Experimental Music Meetings of the III Bienal Americana de Arte (1966).

From 1969 to 1973 he lived in Madrid, Spain, and was part of the ALEA live electronics music group with Luis de Pablo, the ALEA electronic Music Studio and the Project Music and Computer at the University of Madrid. In 1978 he moved to France, where he still resides, and began work at IMEB in Bourges, INA-GRM and IRCAM in Paris. In 1987–1988 was a resident of the DAAD Berliner Kunstler Program, working at the Technische Universität Berlin. Since 1989 he has been Professor of Music (Composition and Research) at the University of Paris VIII. In 1996 founded the CICM (Centre de Recherche Informatique et Création Musicale).

Composition Prizes: Newcomp Prize (Cambridge, USA, 1983). Bourges Prizes (1982, 1986, 1988). Euphonie d'Or (Bourges, 1992). ICMA International Computer Music Association Commission Award (USA, 1992). Ton Bruynel Foundation Prize (Amsterdam, 2010). Giga-Hertz Produktion Preis (ZKM, Karlsruhe, 2011), among others.

Writings and research papers: 54 papers, published in Proceedings, books (MIT Press, Harwoord Academic Publishers, Swett and Zeitlinger, L’Harmattan, Routledge) and specialized journals (Computer Music Journal, Contemporary Music Review, Journal of New Music Research, Musica-Realtà, etc.).

== Selected Compositions ==
- Secuencias for instrumental ensemble (1963)
- Verticales for instrumental ensemble and Feedback set-up (1965) (CD CMMAS CD017, 2014)
- Sonata IV for piano and tape (1966, LP JME-1, Bienal americana de arte, Cordoba, Argentina)
- Triadas for orchestra (1968)
- Modelos de Universo III for instrumental ensemble and sounds generated by computer (1972)
- Undicit for 18 instruments (1976)
- Octuor (1982), LP Computer Musik, IBM Deutschland (1984)
- Fractal C (1984)
- Thema for bass saxophone & computer-generated tape (1985, CD Wergo WER 2026–2; CD Adda AD581047)
- Tar for bass clarinet & computer-generated tape (1987, CD Le Chant du Monde LCD 278046/47)
- Sçir for contrabass flute in G & tape (1988, CD DAAD Berlin LC 0864)
- Ash (1990, CD Ina REF INAG 6032)
- Till for piano & computer-generated tape (1991, CD Chrysopée Electronique LCD 278 1102)
- Kitab for bass clarinet, piano, contrabass and computer-processed and controlled sounds (1992, CD Centaur CRC 2255)
- Tahil for solo piano (1992, CD Chrysopée Electronique LCD 278 1102)
- Myr for solo piano (1993), CD Chrysopée Electronique LCD 278 1102)
- Schall (1995, CD Chrysopée Electronique LCD 278 1102)
- Nodal (1997, CD Ina REF INAG 6032)
- Agon (1998, CD ICMC 01, Berlin; CD Opus 30 IMEB LCD 2781117)
- Préludes Suspendus II (2000, CD CMR Vol. 24 part 4+5(book + CD)
- Phases for clarinet, piano and electroacoustic set-up (2001, CD Ina REF INAG 6032)
- 24 Variations (2001, CD ICMC Göteborg LJCD 5232)
- Atem for horn, bass clarinet, piano, double bass and electroacoustic set-up (2002) (CD CMR Vol. 24 part 4+5 (book + CD)
- Harrison Variations (2002, CD EMF Media, EM 153)
- Gymel Electroacoustic music (2003)
- Taléas for Paezold recorders and electroacoustics (2002/2004) (CD CMR Vol. 24 part 4+5 (book + CD)
- Arenas (2007, CD Ina REF INAG 6032)
- Préludes Suspendus III (2009)
- Points critiques (2011, CD Ina REF INAG 6032)
- Consort for convolved violins (2011)
- Consort for convolved pianos (2012)
- Arches (2013)
- Mécanique des fluides (2014)

== Bibliography ==
- Horacio Vaggione: Composition theory, Contemporary Music Review (CMR), London, Vol. 24 part 4+5 (book + CD) (2005)
- "Composing with Networks, Objects and Time-scales: An Interview with Horacio Vaggione" (O. Budon), Computer Music Journal 24-3 (2000)
- "An Introduction to Horacio Vaggione's Musical and Theoretical Thought" (Makis Solomos), HAL, Archives ouvertes, 2013)
- Espaces composables : essais sur la musique et la pensée musicale d'Horacio Vaggione (Makis Solomos, éd), Paris L'Harmattan (2007), (book + CD)
- "The Art of Articulation : the Electroacoustic Music of Horacio Vaggione" (Curtis Roads), clang.mat.ucsb Reprint (2005)
- "Horacio Vaggione: Towards a Syntax of Sound" (Jean-Claude Risset) Contemporary Music Review (CMR) Vol. 24
- "Some Ontological Remarks about Music Composition Processes" (Horacio Vaggione), Computer Music Journal 25-1 (2001) (read & download PDF)
- "Objets, représentations, opérations" (Horacio Vaggione), Revue Ars Sonora, Paris (1995) (read & download)
- "The Making of Octuor" (Horacio Vaggione), Computer Music Journal 8-2 (1984)
- "A Note on Object-based Composition" (Horacio Vaggione), Interface - Journal of New Music Research vol. 20, 3-4 (1991)
- "Articulating Microtime" (Horacio Vaggione), Computer Music Journal vol. 20-1 (1996)
- "L'espace composable. Sur quelques catégories opératoires dans la musique électroacoustique" (Horacio Vaggione), in L'espace : musique-philosophie (J.-M. Chouvel, M. Somolos (éds), Paris, L'Harmattan (1997)
- "Son, temps, objet, syntaxe. Vers une approche multi-échelle dans la composition assistée par ordinateur" (Horacio Vaggione), in Musique, rationalité, langage, Cahiers de philosophie du langage n° 3 (1998)
- Formel / informel, musique et philosophie (M. Solomos, A. Soulez, H.Vaggione), Paris L'Harmattan (2003)
- "Une introduction à la pensée musico-théorique d'Horacio Vaggione" (Makis Solomos) HAL archives ouverts (in French)
- "Composition musicale : représentations, granularités, émergences" (Horacio Vaggione), in Anne Sedes (éd): Musique et cognition, Intellectica 1–2, n° 48-49 (2008)
- Manières de faire des sons (A. Soulez, H.Vaggione), L'Harmattan (2010)
- "Coïncidences autour de Granger : l'opératoire et l'objectal en musique" (A. Sedes, G. Carvalho, H. Vaggione) in La pensée de Gilles-Gaston Granger, Paris Éditions Hermann, (2010)

== Sources ==
- Leigh Landy (1994). Experimental Music Notebooks. ISBN 3-7186-5553-5
- Horacio Vaggione: Composition Theory. Contemporary Music Review, Vol 24, Parts 4 + 5, 2015. 0749-4467 (2005) 24.4.1-0
- Solomos, Makis, Ed. (2007). Espaces composables, essais sur la musique et la pensée musicale de Horacio Vaggione. (L'Harmattan, Paris) ISBN 978-2-296-02832-6
- Symposium on Computer Music Composition (1983, Cambridge: MIT Press)
- Roads, Curtis (2001) Microsound (Cambridge: MIT Press) ISBN 0-262-18215-7
- Risset, Jean-Claude (2005) Horacio Vaggione: Towards a Syntax of Sound (Contemporary Music Review vol. 24 part 4+5). Reprinted in French in Risset, Jean-Claude (2014) "Composer le son", Écrits, vol. 1 (Paris, Hermann)
- Solomos, Makis (2013) De la musique au son. L'émergence du son dans la musique des XX et XXI siècles (Presses universitaires de Rennes) ISBN 978-2-75352638-9
- Grove Music Online
