= Vasil Spasov =

Vasil Spasov may refer to:

- Vasil Spasov (chess player) (born 1971), Bulgarian chess grandmaster
- Vasil Spasov (footballer) (1919–1996), Bulgarian football player and manager
- Vasil Spasov (musician) (born 1969), Bulgarian pianist, composer and arranger
