= Pascale Criton =

French composer (born 1954)

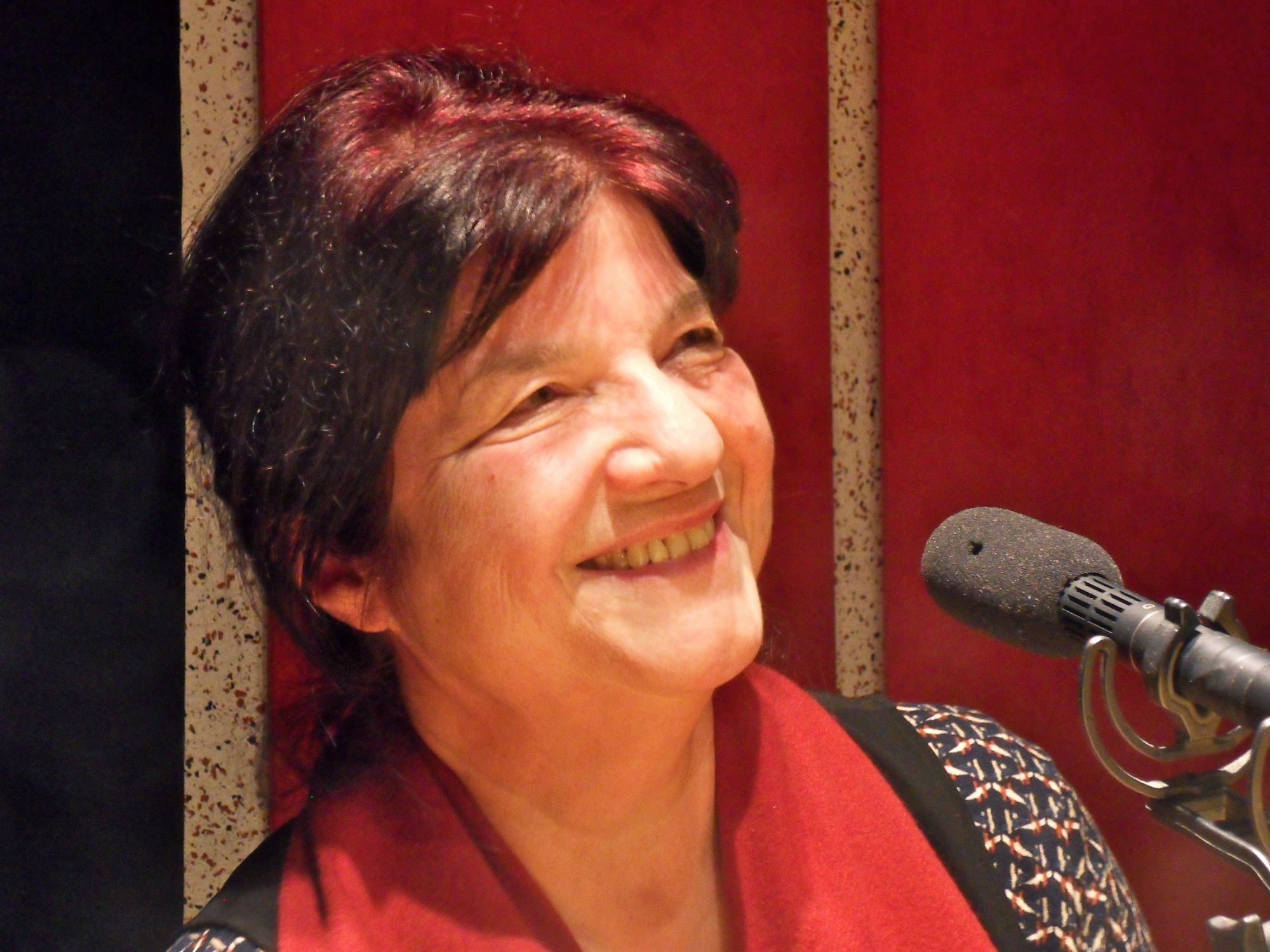

Background information
- Born: 1954 (age 71–72); Paris, France

Pascale Criton (born 1954) is a French composer of contemporary music, and musicologist. She is particularly known for exploiting very dense microtonal scales such as 1/12 tone or 1/16 and beyond for the particular perception properties they imply.

== Life ==
Born in 1954 in Paris, Pascale Criton was the daughter of artists Jean Criton and Dominique d'Acher. She had a compositional formation with Ivan Wyschnegradsky, Gérard Grisey and Jean-Etienne Marie. She took part in the Darmstadt Academy in 1980 and 1988, and had an electroacoustic formation (CIRM,1980–82). She also had a computer music training course, IRCAM(1986). Criton became interested into ethnomusicology as well, taking part in the activities of the "Groupe de Recherche sur la Tradition Orale" (Abidjan 1979).

Her works are created in France and abroad: Darmstadt, American Festival of Microtonal Music (New York), Ircam, Radio France, Manca, Today Musics, Midem, Presences, Intermusica, Ars Electronica, Ijsbrecker Institute, Archipelago Festival, Ilkhom XX (Tashkent), Simn (Bucharest).

== Composition ==
Since the early 80s, she has investigated the microvariability of the sound and she dedicated her instrumental composition to microtonal tuned instruments (pianos, microtonal guitares, strings tuned in 1/4, 1/8, 1/12, 1/16 tone) which it is most of the time associated with diatonic instruments as well as to the Audio synthesis

Her aesthetic and intellectual approach of the music is strongly linked to the thought of philosopher Gilles Deleuze she met in 1987. Pascale Criton takes interest most particularly in the considerations concerning the continuum. In regard to this, her compositional approach lies in going above the natural discontinuity of scales to reach some state of continuity while closing up the continuum thanks to very dense microtonal scales. (very small intervals and very close to each other). And she takes advantage of the very specific properties these microtonal scales have on the ear perception.

The interval of two or three 1/16 tone is very small and is barely recognisable by the ear, but it affects the perception of timbre, rhythm, the feeling of time. Criton takes advantage of this property to create subtle shifting of notes, giving rise to progressive but imperceptible change of musical texture.

== Works ==
- Mémoires for 1/16 tone piano (1982)
- Thymes, for 1/4 tone Piano and digital synthesis (1988)
- Clines, for bass flute, clarinet, violin, cello, piano and tape (1990)
- Biffurcations for cello and 1/16 tone piano (1994)
- Territoires imperceptibles, for bass flute, 1/16 tone tuned guitar and cello(1997)
- La Ritournelle et le galop, 1/16 tone tuned guitar with 1/4 tone frets (1995)
- Le passage des heures, For voice, cello, violin and flute (1998)
- Artefacts for flute, clarinet, horn, timbales, three guitars (amplified, in 1/12 tone), violin, viola, cello, doublebasse(2001)
- OUT for waves (2015)
- Bothsways solos and duos for violin and cello tuned in 1/16th of a tone, 5 movements (2015)
- I double for two guitars tuned in 1/12th of a tone (2015)
- Wander steps for two microtonal accordions (2018)

== Bibliography ==
- Herschel, David; Omer Corlaix; Makis Solomos; Roman Brotbeck et al. Pascale Criton, les univers microtempérés, ("Pascale Criton, The micromoderate universes") Collection A la ligne vol. 1, Ensemble 2e2m, 2000.
