= Bára Gísladóttir =

Icelandic musician and composer

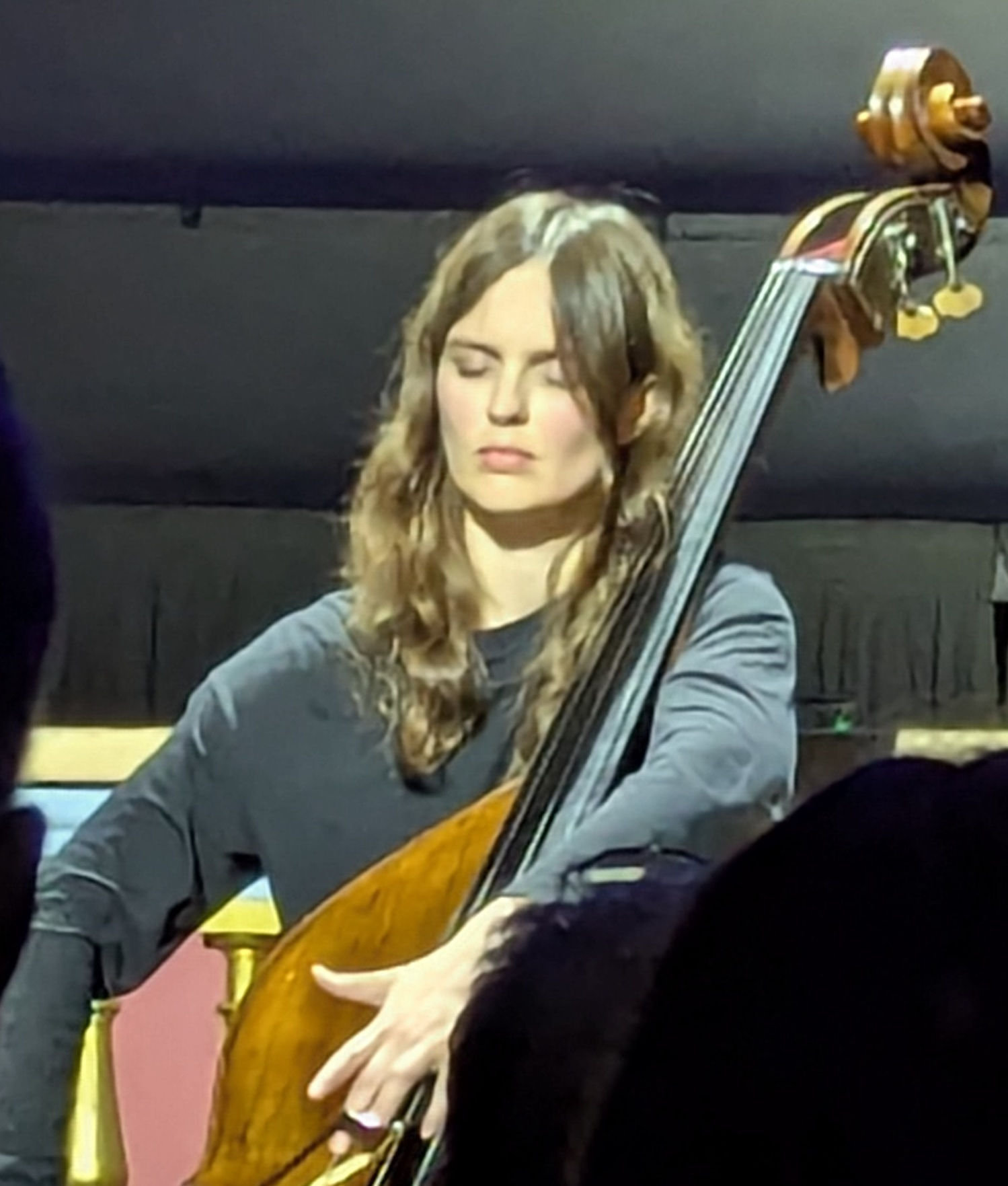

Background information
- Born: November 21, 1989 (age 36); Reykjavík, Iceland
- Genres: Contemporary classical, experimental
- Occupations: Composer, musician
- Instrument: Double bass
- Years active: 2006–present
- Labels: Dacapo Records, Mengi Records, Sono Luminus
- Website: baragisladottir.com

Bára Gísladóttir (born 1989) is an Icelandic composer and double bassist, based in Copenhagen. She often performs with longtime collaborator Skúli Sverrisson. She is the double bassist of Elja Ensemble. Bára has said that her work is concerned with the qualities of sound.

== Biography ==
Born in Reykjavík on 21 November 1989, Bára played the violin from an early age, specialising in double bass from her teens onwards. She studied composition at the Royal Danish Academy of Music where she completed a master's degree and an Advanced Postgraduate Diploma under the guidance of Niels Rosing-Schow and Jeppe Just Christensen. Prior to that she studied composition at the Milan Conservatory with Gabriele Manca and earned a bachelor's degree at the Iceland Academy of Arts with Hróðmar I. Sigurbjörnsson and Þuríður Jónsdóttir.

Bára has released seven albums. Her debut, Different Rooftops, came out in 2015, and contained works that included voice, electronics, saxophone, and double bass. the 2016 follow-up, B R I M S L Ó Ð, employed double bass and electronics across three movements. A 2017 album entitled Mass for some contained compositions for double bass, electronics, and voice. HĪBER, released in 2020, utilised electronics and double bass. Caeli, a collaboration with Skúli Sverrisson, was released in 2021. SILVA, a single hour-long composition for double bass and electronics, was released in 2023 and Orchestra Works with the Iceland Symphony Orchestra was released in 2024.

Her works are published by Edition S in Denmark.

== Prizes ==
Bára has received the Carl Nielsen and Anne Marie Carl-Nielsen Foundation's Talent Awards, the Léonie Sonning Talent Prize, and won the "Shout Out" award at The Reykjavík Grapevine Music Awards. She was nominated at the Icelandic Music Awards in 2019 and 2020 for "piece of the year" and the Carl Prize in 2020 as "Composer of the Year – Chamber Ensemble". In 2022, she was nominated for the Nordic Council Music Prize. She received the Ernst von Siemens Composer Prize in 2024.

== Discography ==
- Different Rooftops (2015)
- B R I M S L Ó Ð (2016)
- Mass for some (2017, Mengi Records)
- HĪBER (2020, Dacapo Records)
- Caeli (2021, Sono Luminus), with Skúli Sverrisson
- SILVA (2023, Sono Luminus)
- Orchestral Works (2024, Dacapo Records), with the Iceland Symphony Orchestra

=== Other recordings ===
- "Ós" (2018), on Atmospheriques, vol. I (2023, Sono Luminus), by the Iceland Symphony Orchestra
