= Cassandra Miller =

Canadian experimental composer

Cassandra Miller (born Metchosin, British Columbia, Canada, 1976) is a Canadian experimental composer currently based in London, UK. Her work is known for frequently utilising the process of transcription of a variety of pre-existing pieces of music.

She has been widely commissioned by international orchestras, ensembles and soloists, and has won the Jules Léger Prize for New Chamber Music twice, in 2016 and in 2011. In 2019, writers of The Guardian ranked her Duet for cello and orchestra (2015) the 19th greatest work of art music since 2000, with Kate Molleson writing, "Miller is a master of planting a seed and setting in motion an entrancing process, then following through with the most sumptuous conviction." Writing in The New Yorker, Alex Ross described her viola concerto I cannot love without trembling as "music of bruising immediacy".

From 2018 to 2020 Miller was Associate Head of Composition at the Guildhall School of Music and Drama, leading the undergraduate programme. She has been invited as a visiting teacher and lecturer at many institutions including Stanford, Columbia, and CalArts, London’s Royal Academy of Music, Birmingham Conservatoire, McGill University, the University of Manitoba, and the Orkest de Ereprijs Young Composers Meeting.

== Education ==
Miller studied with Christopher Butterfield at the University of Victoria (2005) and at the Royal Conservatory of the Hague (2008) with Richard Ayres and Yannis Kyriakides before studying privately with Michael Finnissy in 2012.

Miller returned to academic research in 2014, as a PhD candidate at the University of Huddersfield, supervised by Dr Bryn Harrison and supported by the Jonathan Harvey Scholarship.

== Career ==
Miller's music has been commissioned and performed by orchestras including BBC Scottish Symphony Orchestra, the Oslo Philharmonic, the Toronto Symphony Orchestra and the Winnipeg Symphony Orchestra. Ensembles who have performed her work include EXAUDI Vocal Ensemble, Explore Ensemble, the London Sinfonietta, I Musici de Montréal, Ensemble Plus-Minus, Ensemble contemporain de Montréal, and Continuum Contemporary Music.

She has ongoing artistic relationships with the soprano Juliet Fraser and the Canadian string quartet Quatuor Bozzini, for whom she wrote the pieces About Bach (2015), Leaving (2011), Warblework (2011) and Just So (2008/2018). These four works were released as an album by the label Another Timbre in 2018, alongside a second album of her orchestra and ensemble music.

From 2010 to 2013, Miller also was artistic director of the concert series "Innovations en concert" in Montreal. Miller moved to London to take up the post of Associate Head of Composition (Undergraduate) at the Guildhall School of Music and Drama in September 2018.

In March 2023, her viola concerto, I cannot love without trembling, was premiered. This piece was commissioned by violist Lawrence Power, BBC Radio 3, Canada's National Arts Centre Orchestra, and the Scottish Chamber Orchestra.

In May 2023, Miller's chamber work Perfect Offering featured as the title track of Explore Ensemble's album of the same name, released on Huddersfield Contemporary Records, which Ian Potter, writing in Tempo, described as 'A must-listen for a monumental snapshot of British new music of the past years'.

In October 2024, Miller received two Ivor Novello Award nominations at The Ivors Classical Awards 2024. The City, Full of People was nominated for Best Choral Composition and I cannot love without trembling was nominated for Best Orchestral Composition in association with Dorico. The City, Full of People, went on to win the Ivor Novello Award for Best Choral Composition on November 12, 2024. The City, Full of People was commissioned by Eamonn Quinn for Louth Contemporary Music Society (LCMS). The premiere was performed by Chamber Choir Ireland conducted by Paul Hiller at LCMS Folks' Music Festival in Dundalk Ireland June 2023

In October 2025, Miller was nominated for an Ivor Novello Award for her piece Chanter for guitar and string ensemble.

== Use of transcription ==
Miller often bases her work on pre-existing music, for example: a computer transcription of Kurt Cobain singing the folk song "Where Did You Sleep Last Night?", in for mira (2012), written for violinist Mira Benjamin, a recording of Maria Callas singing "Vissi d’arte" from Puccini's opera Tosca in Bel Canto (2010), and a recording by Mozambican mbira player Zhukake Masingi in Philip the Wanderer (2012).

Her work takes these transcriptions as starting points, investigating her response to the music through processes of repetition and looping. Often the source material is unrecognisable in Miller's finished works.

Her works employ musical notation, but also sometimes recordings of the source music, which performers learn by memory, such as a recording of the blues singer Maria Muldaur, which Miller uses in her piece Guide (2013).

== Selected works ==
- I cannot love without trembling (2022) for viola and orchestra
- Swim (2024) for orchestra
- Dad Goes to the Mountain (2025) for orchestra
- Three Songs (2025) for string quartet
- Chanter (2024) for guitar and string orchestra
- The City, Full of People (2023) for sixteen mixed voices
- Bismillah Meets the Creator in Springtime (with Silvia Tarozzi) (2022) for two soloists, large spatialized ensemble and fixed audio
- La Donna (2021) for orchestra, commissioned by L'Auditori from Barcelona
- Perfect Offering (2020/21), for septet
- Round (2017) for orchestra, for the Toronto Symphony Orchestra
- Tracery (2017–2018) for voice and tape, in collaboration with Juliet Fraser
  - Tracery : Hardanger (2017)
  - Tracery : Lazy, Rocking (2017)
  - Tracery : The Slits (2017)
  - Tracery : attending to a task (2018)
- Traveller Song (2017) for ensemble, for Plus Minus
- About Bach (2015) for string quartet
- Duet for cello and orchestra (2015) for Charles Curtis and the BBC Scottish Symphony Orchestra at Tectonics Festival
- Guide (2013) for vocal ensemble, for EXAUDI
- Philip the Wanderer (2012) for piano
- For Mira (2012) for solo violin
- Leaving (2011) for string quartet
- Warblework (2011) for string quartet
- Bel Canto (2010) for mezzo-soprano and ensemble
- A Large House (2009) for orchestra, for the Janácěk Philharmonic at the Ostrava New Music Days
- Just So (2008/2018) for string quartet
- O Zomer! (2007) for the Asko Ensemble
- Orfeo by Monteverdi by Cassandra Miller (2006) for ensemble
- Dry Bones (1998), for eight timpani, bass drum, viola and cello
- Through night and day and in and out of weeks and almost over a year (1998) for two recorders, prepared cello and three prepared double basses
