= Antonia Soulez =

French musician and philosopher

- Born: 1943 (age 82–83); Paris, France

Philosophical work
- Main interests: Philosophy of language, Logic, Wittgenstein, Vienna Circle
- Notable works: Détrôner l’Être, Wittgenstein antiphilosophe ? (en réponse à Badiou) (2016); Au fil du motif, autour de Wittgenstein et la musique (2012); Le projet d’une grammaire philosophique chez Platon : du Cratyle au Sophiste (1991)

Antonia Soulez (born 1943 in Paris) is a French philosopher, musician, poet, and emerita professor of philosophy at Paris 8 St-Denis.

== Life ==
She started teaching philosophy in Lille before relocating to Amiens. She then taught at Tunis University, Créteil, and Nancy before finally settling at the university of Paris 8 St-Denis. She co-directed the Collège international de philosophie between 2001 and 2004.

== Thought ==
After a thesis on Plato, she shifted towards philosophy of language and logic and Wittgenstein. She is now a specialist of the Vienna Circle and of Wittgenstein.

== Publications ==
- Détrôner l’Être, Wittgenstein antiphilosophe ? (en réponse à Badiou). Paris : Lambert-Lucas, 2016.
- Au fil du motif, autour de Wittgenstein et la musique. Sampzon : Delatour France, 2012.
- Le projet d’une grammaire philosophique chez Platon : du Cratyle au Sophiste. Paris : PUF, 1991.
