= Yoshikazu Iwamoto =

Japanese musician

Yoshikazu Iwamoto (Japanese: 岩本由和; born 1945) is a Japanese-born professional shakuhachi player living in the United Kingdom.
