= Mariam Rezaei =

English musician (born 1984)

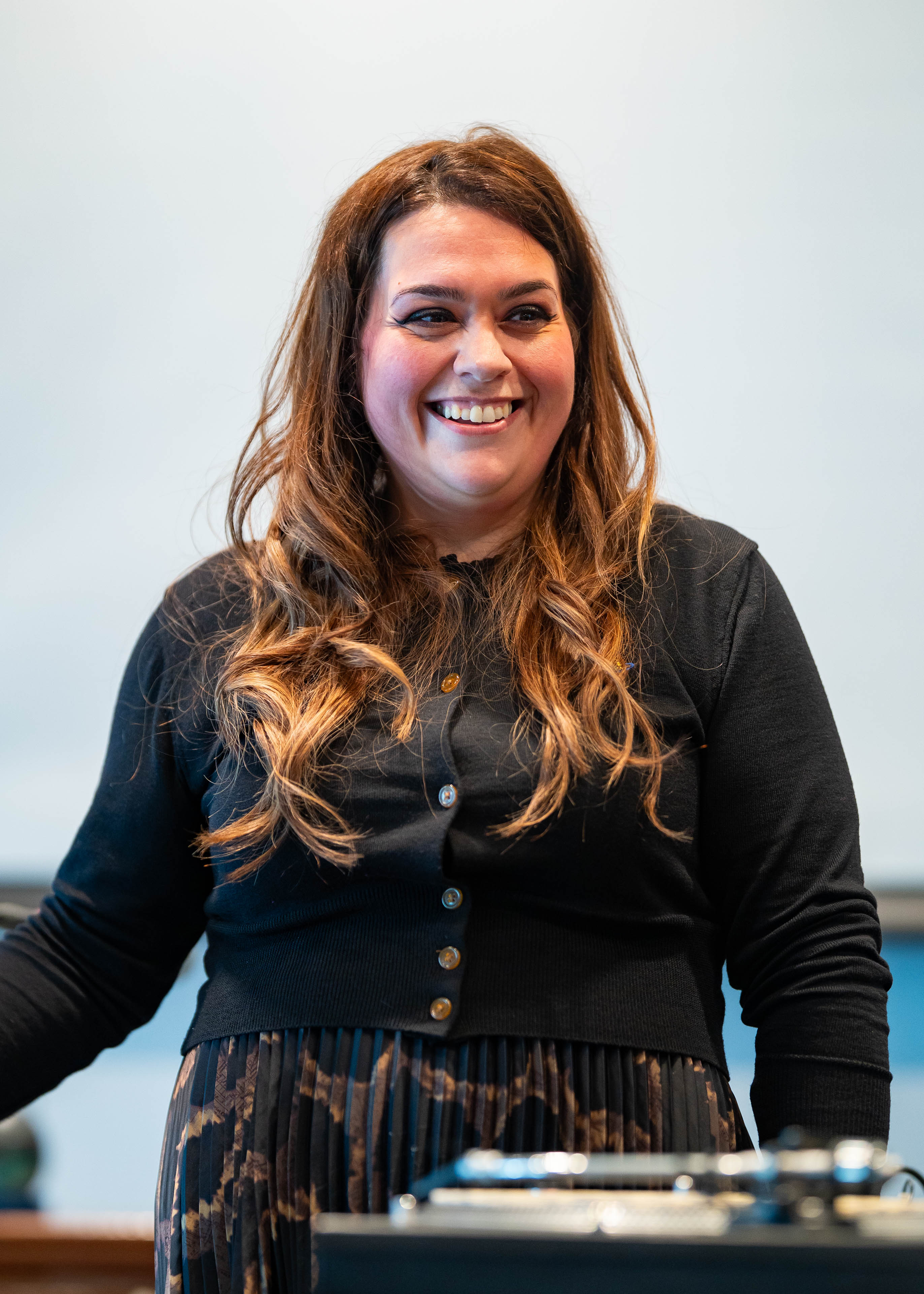
- Rezaei at Punktfestivalen 2025
- Born: 16 October 1984 (age 41); Gateshead, Tyne and Wear, England
- Occupations: Musician, artist, academic
- Years active: 2011–present
- Website: mariamrezaei.co.uk

Mariam Rezaei (born 16 October 1984) is an English composer, writer, performer, DJ and improviser. Mariam works predominantly with turntables, piano, vocals and electronics. She was formerly producer of TOPH, a producing mixed arts space in Newcastle, and is now Artistic Director of TUSK Festival.

A number of Rezaei's compositions and performances have been featured on BBC Radio 3 since 2015.

== Early life and education ==
Mariam is from Gateshead, Tyne and Wear and of English-Iranian heritage. She grew up playing the classical piano. She first developed an interest in DJing at the age of fifteen and began writing music at this time. Her interest in writing with turntables developed a little while later, as she was competing in local and national DJ competitions. She completed and was awarded her Doctoral degree in the Philosophy of Composition For Turntable and Ensemble at Durham University in May 2016 and is a lecturer in Music Technology and Composition at Newcastle University.

== Career ==
For the 2012 Cultural Olympiad, she composed for NOISESTRA, to perform with Apartment House at the Sage Gateshead, 2012 and Edinburgh in 2013. She was invited by Ilan Volkov as a guest improviser for the BBC Proms 47 in 2012, at the John Cage Centenary Celebration. She performed 'Jig Hop' with Kathryn Tickell and Folkestra for the BT River of Music Festival as part of the 2012 Cultural Olympiad, in Trafalgar Square.

In 2014 she performed graphic scores by Richard Dawson, developing new work as Wax Magnetic, a new BFI commission for 'Der Golem' with Noize Choir, 'SuperDream' with Isis Arts, Swallows Foundation, British Council ZA and The Trinity Session ZA. Other commissions around this time include Olavsfestdagene, Norway, for Turntable Quartet, Solo voice and Double Bassist Michael Duch, and 'INSiiiDE' an ensemble piece for Ilan Volkov, Tectonics Festival, Tel Aviv. 'ANX' was a commission for TECTONICS GLASGOW and the BBC, for members of the BBC SSO and Glasgow Improvisers Orchestra, premiered on 1 May and broadcast on BBC Radio 3. With support from Arts Council England, Mariam began the first ever composer residency at the Literary and Philosophical Society Library, Newcastle, in May 2014, working with Neil Davidson (Glasgow), Rhodri Davies (Gateshead) and Michael Duch (Norway) in short-term research projects.

In 2015 Mariam composed and performed in theatre including 'Flock' and 'Cinema' by ZENDEH, 'Beats North' by Curious Monkey, both in 2015 'Into Thin Air' by Precious Cargo, 'Here Is The News' Northern Stage and Lorne Campbell, 'Your Aunt Fanny', Live Theatre and 'Jumping Puddles' by Open Clasp Theatre Co.

=== TOPH / The Old Police House ===
In 2013 Rezaei set up a studio and performance space at The Old Police House in Gateshead.

An organisation and artists' collective called TOPH (of which Rezaei is a director and artist member) has developed from and beyond this specific location. TOPH has hosted the TUSK FRINGE as part of TUSK Festival, Gateshead since 2015.

== Awards ==
Mariam was awarded Best Newcomer 2012 Award at the Journal Culture Awards and the 'Enhancing Communities' Award with Northern Proud Voices in 2014.

In 2022 Rezaei received the Paul Hamlyn Foundation 'Awards for Artists' prize for her contribution to the field of music composition.
