= Donata Premeru =

Musicologist, broadcaster, journalist, lecturer and historian (born 1934)

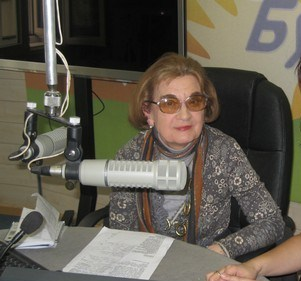
- Donata Premeru in the studio of Radio Belgrade
- Born: 4 June 1934 (age 91); Kingdom of Yugoslavia
- Occupations: musicologist, broadcaster

Donata Premeru (born 4 June 1934) is a former Yugoslav musicologist, broadcaster, lyricist, journalist, lecturer and historian of Arts based in Belgrade, Serbia.

== Biography and career ==
After graduation at the Musicology and History of Arts in Zagreb in Croatia, she did postgraduate studies of Early and Contemporary Music at London University in the United Kingdom. Donata started as student lecturer and broadcaster at Radio Zagreb and continued as Music Editor of Stereorama programme on Radio Belgrade. In 1965 she was invited to start the Radio Beograd Third Programme (music section) as its first musicologist, and in 1983 its stereo weekend Music Programme Stereorama.

The composer, writer and artist Dušan Radić (1929-2010) in his book Tragovi balkanske vrleti-vreme-život-muzika (2007) dedicated a whole section (p. 107-114) to Donata Premeru and her broadcast programme Music Matters. For after 20 years of his absence from the musical scene, she interrupted this silence and invited him in her radio programme regarding his 75th birthday on April 10, 2004.

In 2016, book Film and Music – Temptations of great composers – based on 14 radio programmes – was published with her guest, Borislav Stojkov.

== Honours and awards ==
- 1965, 1st Prize on Radio Belgrade
- 1990, The Journalistic Golden Microphone of Radio Belgrade for 25 Years of Highest Achievements in Broadcasting Media given the first time to a Music Editor
- 2006, Acknowledgement and Diploma from the GitarArt festival as to a professional promoter in 2014.

== Published papers and articles ==
- On Children’s Operas (1997)
- Conversations with Contemporary Composers and Musicians, 2000/2012 /first broadcast on the III program/: Pierre Boulez, Michael Tippett, Peter Pears, Hans Werner Henze, Peter Ruzicka, Peter Maxwell Davies, George Benjamin, Goffredo Petrassi, Ada Gentile, Gloria Coates
- In daily newspapers: Politika, Borba, Naša Borba, Danas
- In magazines: OKO (Zagreb), Il mondo della musica (Rome) & The C.E.J. Newsletter (EU Community of Journalists) – in Italian, New Moment Magazine (London) and TEMPO a Quarterly Review of Modern Music (Cambridge, UK)
- III Programme, Magazine of Radio Belgrade, Projekat, Pozorište (Novi Sad), Reč, Pro Femina, Pro Musica, Continuo, Novi Zvuk/New Sound, Teatron, Muzikologija, Književnost, Književni magazin, Koraci, Muzika klasika
- First Opera Leksikon (Belgrade, 2008) she wrote articles mainly on contemporary operas (Daniel Börtz Marie Antoinette; Zoltán Kodály Háry János; György Ligeti Le grand macabre; Luigi Nono Intolleranza 1960; Emil Petrovič C'est la guerre!; Sándor Szokolay/Federico García Lorca/ Vérnász, Isidora Žebeljan Zora D., Ferenc Erkel Bánk Bán)
