= Bozhidar Spasov =

Bulgarian composer (born 1949)

Bozhidar Spasov (Bojidar Spassov, Cyrillic: Божидар Спасов) (born 1949) is a Bulgarian composer.

Born on 13.08.1949 in Sofia, Spasov went to Moscow to study music, graduating in composition from the Moscow Conservatory in 1975. He then became a research associate with the Musicology Institute of the Bulgarian Academy of Sciences. His music shows an awareness of contemporary trends, such as the music of Karlheinz Stockhausen and Luciano Berio; he takes much of his inspiration from medieval texts. Among his works are two chamber opera-ballets, 1975's Omagyosaniyat (The Bewitched) and Printsesata i svinaryat (The Princess and the Swineherd) of 1980.
