= Rebecca Saunders =

British-born music composer based in Germany (born 1967)

Rebecca Saunders (born 19 December 1967) is a London-born composer who lives and works freelance in Berlin. In a 2017 Classic Voice poll of the greatest works of art music since 2000, Saunders' compositions received the third highest total number of votes (30), surpassed only by the works of Georg Friedrich Haas (49) and Simon Steen-Andersen (35). In 2019, writers of The Guardian ranked Skin (2016) the 16th greatest work of art music since 2000, with Tom Service writing that "Saunders burrows into the interior world of the instruments, and inside the grain of Fraser's voice [...] and finds a revelatory world of heightened feeling.". Her opera Lash – Acts of Love was premiered at Deutsche Oper Berlin in mid-2025 to critical acclaim.

== Biography ==
Saunders studied violin and composition at the University of Edinburgh, earning a PhD in composition in 1997. As a DAAD scholar, she studied with Wolfgang Rihm from 1991 to 1994 at the Hochschule für Musik Karlsruhe; Nigel Osborne supervised her doctoral thesis.

Her awards include the Busoni Prize of the Academy of Arts, Berlin, Sponsorship award (1994), the Ernst von Siemens Composer Prize (1996), the Hindemith Prize of the Schleswig-Holstein Musik Festival (2003), the composition prize of the ARD, and the Mauricio Kagel Music Prize (2015). In 2019 she won the Ernst von Siemens Music Prize (main prize), the second woman, and first female composer to be awarded. In 2024, Rebecca Saunders received the Golden Lion for Lifetime Achievement from La Biennale di Venezia.

In 2010 and 2012, she taught at the Darmstadt International Summer Courses and was composer-in-residence at the Konzerthaus Dortmund from 2005 to 2006, Staatskapelle Dresden from 2009 to 2010, and Huddersfield Contemporary Music Festival in 2010. In the 2023/24 season, Saunders was featured as a composer in residence in a portrait series at the Elbphilharmonie Hamburg.

Fabio Luisi and the Staatskapelle Dresden gave the UK premiere of Saunders' revision of traces at the 2009 Proms. She is a member of the Berlin Academy of Arts, the Saxon Academy of Arts in Dresden, and the Bavarian Academy of the Fine Arts. Her music has been performed by notable ensembles worldwide, including Ensemble Musikfabrik, Klangforum Wien, Ensemble Modern, Ensemble Dal Niente, the Arditti Quartet, Ensemble Resonanz, Ensemble Recherche, and the BBC Symphony Orchestra.

In 2024, Saunders received the Ivor Novello Award in the category Best Small Chamber Composition for The Mouth, for soprano and tape. She has won multiple Royal Philharmonic Society Music Awards, including for Stirrings Still (2008), Fletch (2013), Skin (2017), and Yes (2019). She has also received British Composer Awards. She received the GEMA Music Prize for Instrumental Music at the German Music Authors' Prize. She received the Hans and Gertrud Zender Foundation Prize. In 2018 she received an honorary doctorate from the University of Huddersfield. In 2023 she was awarded an honorary Doctor of Music by the University of Edinburgh, and in 2026 she was awarded with the Wihuri Sibelius Prize.

== Music ==
Saunders's music is characterized by limited pitch material and a wide breadth of timbral complexity. She is fascinated with resonance and extraneous noise created by instrumentalists, such as the scratch of a bow change, the thud of the pedals of a piano or harp, and the taps and slides of the left hand on a string instrument's fingerboard. Due to the subtleties and specificity of the sounds she creates, Saunders includes lengthy textual explanations in many of her scores to describe each effect that she wishes the performer to produce.

Much of Saunders's music is based upon a single pitch, or sometimes a small collection of pitches which govern large sections of music. Therefore, development and elaboration are determined more by sonority and texture rather than traditional voice leading. However, she does sometimes include "quasi-diatonic" pitch collections, which suggest a more traditional context than that of her music based on single notes.

Rebecca Saunders has also explored physical space in her music. In an interview for the Huddersfield Contemporary Music Festival, she described her music thus:

For me, what's really important is enabling the listener to feel the magical physicality of sound, the timbre, the colour, the mass, the weight, of sound. That's what I feel I'm working with, almost like a sculptor works with different materials.

By describing the "mass and weight" of her music, and comparing her art to that of a sculpture, she is attempting to bring sound into a physical plane. Additionally, in works like chroma, she invites the listener to wander around and explore the influence of physical space on the audience's experience.

== Works ==
- Behind the Velvet Curtain (1991–92), for trumpet, harp, piano and cello
- Trio (1992), for clarinet, violoncello and piano
- Mirror, mirror on the wall (1993–94), for piano
- The Under Side of Green (1994), for clarinet, violin and piano
- Molly's Song 1—crimson (1995), for twelve soloists, metronome, whistle, music box and conductor
- Molly's Song 2—a shade of crimson (1995), for voice, viola, flute, steel string guitar and shortwave radios
- Molly's Song 3—shades of crimson (1995), for alto flute, viola, steel-stringed guitar, four radios and music box
- Duo (1996), for violin and piano
- Into the Blue (1996), for clarinet, bassoon, cello, double bass, piano and percussion
- dichroic seventeen (1996), for piano, two percussionists, two double basses, accordion and electric guitar
- G and E on A (1996–97), for orchestra and 27 music boxes
- String Quartet (1997)
- QUARTET (1998), for piano, B-flat clarinet/bass clarinet, double bass and accordion
- cinnabar (1999), for violin, trumpet and ensemble
- duo four – two exposures (2000–01), for solo trumpet, solo percussion and orchestra
- albescere (2001), for twelve instruments and five voices
- vermilion (2003), for clarinet, electric guitar and cello
- insideout (2003), for woodwinds, brass, timpani, percussion, piano, strings, accordion, electric guitar — music for the choreographic installation by Sasha Waltz
- blaauw (2004), for double-bell trumpet
- Choler (2004), for piano duo
- Miniata (2004), for accordion, piano, choir and orchestra
- Crimson (2004–05), for piano
- Fury I (2005), for double bass
- Blue and Gray (2005), for two double basses
- rubricare (2005), for strings and organ
- A Visible Trace (2006), for seven soloists and conductor
- Traces (2006–09), for orchestra
- Soliloquy (2007), for six voices a cappella
- Stirrings Still I (2007), for alto flute, oboe, clarinet, piano and bowed crotales
- Stirrings Still II (2008), for six players: alto flute, oboe, clarinet in A, crotales, piano and double bass
- Company (2008), for counter tenor, trumpet, violoncello, accordion and electric guitar
- Disclosure (2008), for five players: bass clarinet (doubling clarinet), trumpet, trombone, piano and violin
- murmurs (2009), Collage for ten players
- Fury II (2010), Concert for double bass and ensemble
- To and fro (2010), for violin and oboe
- Stratum (2010), for orchestra
- Stasis I (2011), a special collage for 16 soloists
- Stasis collective (2011–16), a special collage for 23 musicians
- Stasis II (2011–14), quartet for trumpet, oboe, percussion and piano
- Caerulean (2011), for bass clarinet
- Dialogue (2011), for viola and percussion
- Neither (2011), for 2 double bell trumpets
- Stirrings (2011), for nine players: alto flute, clarinet in A (boehm system), oboe, crotales (top octave with 2 violoncello bows), piano (grand), harp, violin, violoncello (IV scordatura), double bass (with five strings, V scordatura)
- Still (2011), for violin and orchestra
- Ire (2012), Concerto for violoncello, strings and percussion
- Fletch (2012), for string quartet
- Shadow (2013), for piano
- ...of waters making moan (2013), for accordion
- Solitude (2013), for violoncello
- Void (2013–14), for two percussionists and chamber orchestra
- Alba (2014), for trumpet and orchestra
- Six for AK (2015), for 2 percussionists, piano (2 players), guitar (steel strings) and harp
- White (2015, revised 2016), for double bell trumpet solo
- Skin (2016), for soprano and ensemble
- Myriad (2015–2016) sound installation of 2464 identical musical box mechanisms
- O Yes & I, for soprano and bass flute (text: James Joyce)
- Yes (2017), collage for soprano voice and 19 soloists
- Nether (2018/19), for soprano voice and 19 soloists (extract from Yes)
- Scar (2018–19), for 15 soloists and conductor
- Withinnan (2019), for solo inside the piano
- Unsaid (2019), for solo piano
- The Mouth (2018–2020), for soprano voice and tape
- to an utterance – study (2020), for solo piano
- void II (2014/2020), for two percussion
- Either/Or (2017/2020), for two double-bell trumpets
- to an utterance (2020), concerto for piano and orchestra
- That Time (2019/21), for baritone saxophone, piano and percussion
- dust II (2018/2020), for two percussion
- Us Dead Talk Love (2021), for alto voice, tenor saxophone, e-guitar, Korg organ and percussion (text: Ed Atkins)
- Hauch II (2021), for solo viola
- Hauch – Dance (2021), collage for 8 musicians and 3 dancers
- Taste (2022), for violin and piano (co-written with Enno Poppe)
- Wound (2022–23), for soloist ensemble and large orchestra
- Whispers (2023), for solo violin
- Breath (2023), for violin duo
- Skull (2023), for 14 instruments and conductor
- Rockaby (2017–2024), collage for 5 musicians and 200 music boxes
- Lash – Acts of Love (2023–25), opera for actress, 3 singers, 3 instrumental soloists and large orchestra
- Chroma (I–XXIII) (2003–25), collage for 12–16 musicians and objects
