= Ensemble Musikfabrik =

Contemporary classical music ensemble based in Cologne, Germany

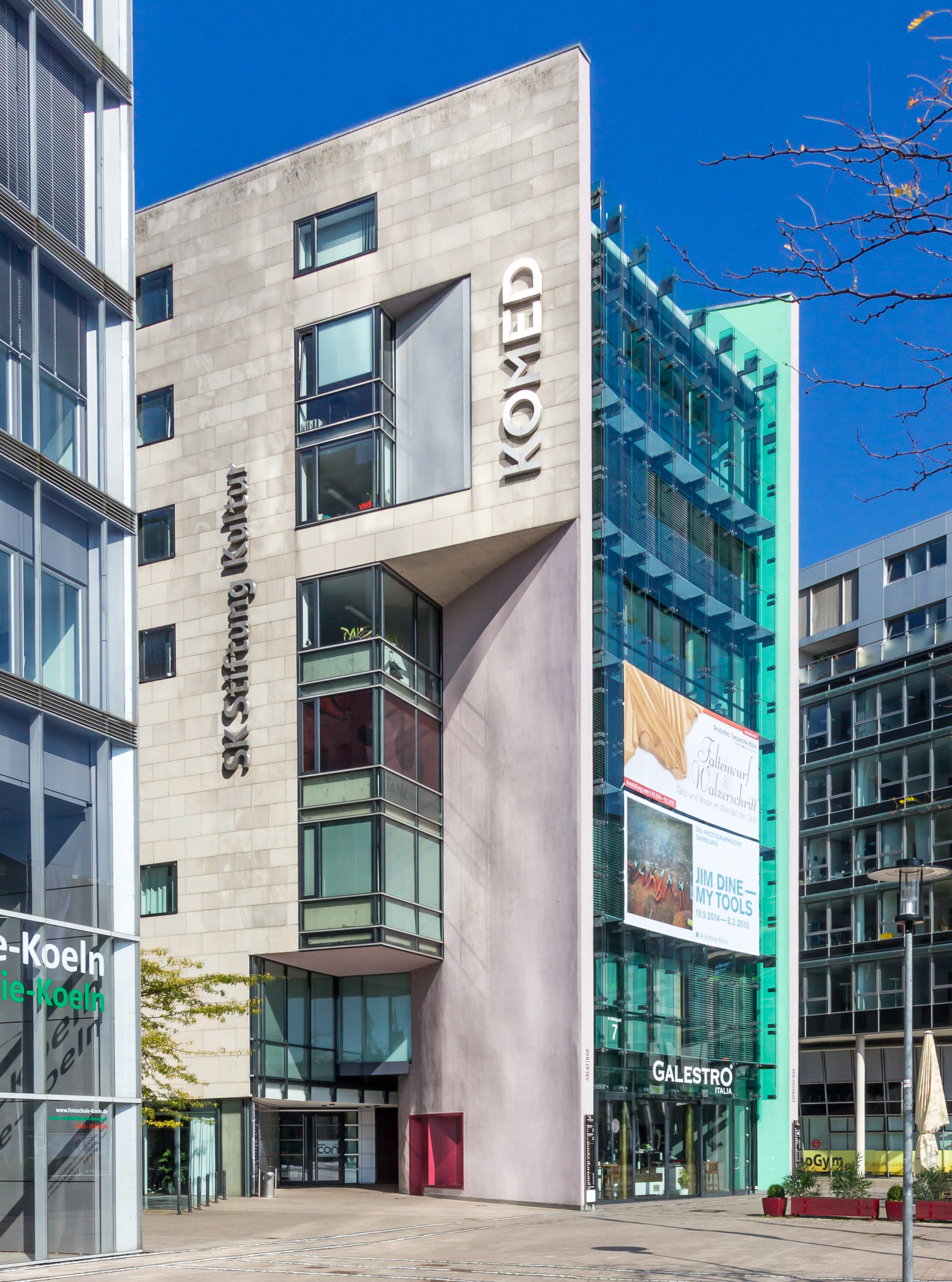
The KOMED building at MediaPark 7 in Cologne, where Ensemble Musikfabrik is based.

The Ensemble Musikfabrik (music factory ensemble) is an ensemble for contemporary classical music located in Cologne. Their official name is Ensemble Musikfabrik Landesensemble NRW e.V. (Ensemble Musikfabrik of the state of North Rhine-Westphalia, registered association).

== Overview ==
Ensemble Musikfabrik was founded in 1990, and is regarded as one of the leading ensembles for contemporary music. As the name suggests, musikFabrik is especially dedicated to artistic innovation. New and in their medial form unknown works that they have often commissioned are their actual production area. The results of this work, frequently in a close collaboration with the composers, are presented by the ensemble of international soloists in 80 to 100 concerts a year in Germany and abroad in festivals and in their own world Première series "Musikfabrik in WDR" along with regular radio and CD productions. The Ensemble Musikfabrik is supported by the state of North Rhine-Westphalia.

== History ==
They gave their debut under the name „Ensemble Neue Musik Nordrhein-Westfalen“, 28 April 1991, at the Wittener Tage für neue Kammermusik (Witten Days for new chamber music). The formation of the ensemble took place at the end of 1990. The founders of the ensemble, Bernhard Wambach, Nicolaus A. Huber, and Gerhard Stäbler and the designated conductor and artistic director Johannes Kalitzke selected and summoned almost 20 musicians and presented the proposed project. Most of the musicians present were excited about the idea of forming a full-time professional ensemble that would be working on contemporary music and programs in close collaboration with composers.

Since 1997, the ensemble has organised itself and made all important artistic decisions within its own ranks. The emphasis shifted then from North Rhine-Westphalian composers to a more international focus.

Founded after the Amsterdam Asko Ensemble (formed 1965), the London Sinfonietta (1968), the Schönberg Ensemble (Den Haag, 1974), Ensemble InterContemporain (Paris, 1976), Ensemble Modern (Frankfurt, 1980), Klangforum Wien (Vienna) and Freiburg's ensemble recherche (both 1985), Ensemble Musikfabrik is one of the youngest leading New Music ensembles in the world.

In 2003, Ensemble Musikfabrik moved from Düsseldorf to Cologne. Thanks to generous support from the Kunststiftung NRW, WDR (West German Radio) and KölnMusik, musikFabrik has now a highly successful world Première concert series "musikFabrik in WDR“. MusikFabrik prepares for these concerts and for other projects in their new domicile in the KOMED building in MediaPark (Cologne), where they moved in the summer of 2008.

== Profile ==
The musicians of Ensemble Musikfabrik have collaborated with both the younger generation of conductors, composers, directors and choreographers as well as the more renowned ones. The guest list of the ensemble includes Mark Andre, Louis Andriessen, Stefan Asbury, Oscar Bettison, Sir Harrison Birtwistle, Unsuk Chin, Péter Eötvös, Brian Ferneyhough, Heiner Goebbels, Toshio Hosokawa, Michael Jarrell, Mauricio Kagel, György Kurtág, Helmut Lachenmann, David Lang, Liza Lim, Benedict Mason, Mouse on Mars, Carlus Padrissa (La Fura dels Baus), Emilio Pomàrico, Enno Poppe, Clement Power, Wolfgang Rihm, Peter Rundel, Rebecca Saunders, Karlheinz Stockhausen, Ilan Volkov and Sasha Waltz. Since 2012 they have performed a number of works by Harry Partch, using a set of replicas of Partch's instruments built for the ensemble by Thomas Meixner.

The experimentation and implementation with modern forms of communication, experimental electronics, dance, theatre, film, literature, and creative arts broaden the conventional form of a conducted ensemble concert along with chamber music and the frequent confrontation with works that have an open form and include improvisation. Lecture discussion concerts and experimenting with a concert form that allows the integration of audience participation belong to these ideas.

== Members ==
Helen Bledsoe (Flute), Carl Rosman (Clarinet), Peter Veale (Oboe), Christine Chapman (Horn), Marco Blaauw (Trumpet), Bruce Collings (Trombone), Melvyn Poore (Tuba, Sound), Benjamin Kobler (Piano), Ulrich Löffler (Piano), Dirk Rothbrust (Percussion), Sara Cubarsi (Violin), Hannah Weirich (Violin), Axel Porath (Viola), Dirk Wietheger (Violoncello), Florentin Ginot (Double Bass).
