= 2015 in classical music =

== Events ==
- January 14 – Opening night gala concert at the Philharmonie de Paris
- January 15 – The Alabama Symphony Orchestra announces the appointment of Carlos Izcaray as its next music director, as of September 2015.
- January 19 – The Basel Sinfonietta announces the appointment of Baldur Brönnimann as its first-ever principal conductor, effective with the 2016–2017 season.
- January 23
  - The Konzert Theater Bern announces the appointment of Kevin John Edusei as its next chief conductor, effective with the 2015–2016 season.
  - The city of Brandenburg an der Havel announces the appointment of Peter Gülke as the next chief conductor of the Brandenburger Theater and of the Brandenburger Symphoniker, effective with the 2015–2016 season.
- January 28
  - The Orchestre de la Suisse Romande announces the appointment of Jonathan Nott as its 10th music director and artistic director, effective January 2017.
  - The Kennedy Center for the Performing Arts announces the appointment of Mason Bates as its first-ever composer-in-residence, effective with the 2015–2016 season, for a term of three years.
- February 6
  - The Dusseldorf Symphony Orchestra (Düsseldorfer Symphoniker) announces the appointment of Ádám Fischer as its next principal conductor.
  - The New York Philharmonic announces that Alan Gilbert is to conclude his tenure as the orchestra's music director after the 2016–2017 season.
- February 8 – First US performance of the Felix Mendelssohn edition (1841, Leipzig) of the JS Bach St Matthew Passion
- February 12
  - Arts Council England announces its intention to remove English National Opera from its national portfolio of regularly funded UK arts organisations, and to change its funding arrangement from a three-year plan to a two-year plan, with stipulations that ENO reform its current business model.
  - The Milwaukee Symphony Orchestra announces that Edo de Waart is to conclude his tenure as the orchestra's music director after the 2016–2017 season.
- February 18 – The National Symphony Orchestra and the John F. Kennedy Center for the Performing Arts announce that Christoph Eschenbach is to conclude his music directorship of both organisations after the 2016–2017 season.
- February 22 – The Bruckner Orchestra Linz and Linz Opera announce the appointment of Markus Poschner as their next chief conductor, effective in 2017.
- February 26 – The BBC Philharmonic announces the appointment of Mark Simpson as its next Composer-in-Association, effective September 2015.
- February 27
  - The Auckland Philharmonia Orchestra announces the appointment of Giordano Bellincampi as its next music director, effective in 2016, with an initial contract of three years.
  - The Memphis Symphony Orchestra announces the scheduled conclusion of the tenure of Mei-Ann Chen as its music director, after the end of the 2015–2016 season.
  - The Cincinnati May Festival announces that James Conlon is to stand down as its music director after the 2016 Festival, and subsequently to take the title of music director laureate.
- March 3 – The London Symphony Orchestra announces the appointment of Sir Simon Rattle as its next music director, effective September 2017, with an initial contract of five years.
- March 4 – The New York Philharmonic announces that David Geffen is to donate $100M USD to the orchestra for the renovation of Avery Fisher Hall, with the proviso that the hall be renamed "David Geffen Hall" and bear the new name in perpetuity.
- March 5 – The Oslo International Church Music Festival 2015 opens in Norway, continuing until March 15.
- March 6 – Palm Beach Opera announces the appointment of David Stern as its next music director, effective June 1, 2015.
- March 9
  - English National Opera announces the appointment of Cressida Pollock, a management consultant, as its interim CEO.
  - The Palau de les Arts Reina Sofia announces the appointments of Roberto Abbado and Fabio Biondi as its next joint music directors, and of Ramón Tebar as its next principal guest conductor.
- March 11
  - The BBC Scottish Symphony Orchestra announces the appointment of Thomas Dausgaard as its 11th chief conductor, effective with the 2016–2017 season.
  - Simon Halsey is announced as the recipient of the Queen's Medal for Music 2014.
- March 16 – Alan Buribayev becomes principal conductor of the Astana Opera House, Kazakhstan.
- March 18 – The Birmingham Conservatoire announces the appointment of Julian Lloyd Webber as its next Principal, after the scheduled retirement of David Saint, the current Principal, in June 2015.
- March 19 – The Montreal Symphony Orchestra announces a new five-year recording contract with Decca Records.
- April 3
  - The Monte-Carlo Philharmonic Orchestra announces the appointment of Kazuki Yamada as its next principal conductor and artistic director, effective September 2016, with an initial contract of three years.
  - The Boston Symphony Orchestra announces a new recording partnership with Deutsche Grammophon that focuses on the music of Dmitri Shostakovich.
- April 9 – The Adelaide Symphony Orchestra announces the appointment of Nicholas Carter as its next chief conductor, with an initial contract of two years.
- April 14 – The Glenn Gould Foundation announces its selection of Philip Glass as the Eleventh Glenn Gould Prize Laureate.
- April 20 – The Japan Philharmonic Orchestra announces the appointment of Pietari Inkinen as its next chief conductor, effective September 2016, with an initial contract of three seasons.
- April 21 – Scottish Opera announces the appointment of Stuart Stratford as its next music director, effective June 1, 2015.
- April 24 – The Royal Liverpool Philharmonic announces the appointment of Sir Andrew Davis as its new conductor emeritus.
- April 28 – The Zurich Chamber Orchestra announces the appointment of Daniel Hope as its next music director, effective in 2016.
- May 1 – The 2015 Malko Competition for conductors announces Tung-Chieh Chuang as this year's winner.
- May 8 – Symphony Number One gives its debut concert at the Baltimore War Memorial.
- May 12 – The BBC National Orchestra of Wales announces the appointment of Huw Watkins as its next Composer-in-Association, for the period 2015–2018.
- May 26 – The BBC announces the appointment of David Pickard as the next director of the BBC Proms.
- June 3 – The Orchester Musikkollegium Winterthur announces the appointment of Thomas Zehetmair as its next principal conductor, effective September 2016, with an initial contract of three seasons.
- June 9 – The RAI National Symphony Orchestra announces the appointment of James Conlon as its next principal conductor, effective with the 2016–2017 season.
- June 10 – The Regina Symphony Orchestra announces the appointment of Gordon Gerrard as its next music director, effective with the 2016–2017 season.
- June 11 – The Orchestre de Paris announces the appointment of Daniel Harding as its 9th principal conductor, effective September 2016.
- June 12 – Queen's Birthday Honours 2015
  - James MacMillan and Karl Jenkins are each made Knight Bachelor.
  - Sir Neville Marriner is made a Companion of Honour.
  - Simon Halsey and Mark-Anthony Turnage are each made a Commander of the Order of the British Empire.
- June 17 – The Residentie Orchestra announces the appointment of Nicholas Collon as its co-principal conductor, effective August 1, 2016, for a minimum term of three years.
- June 19 – Jongmin Park wins the Song Prize in the 2015 Cardiff Singer of the World competition.
- June 21
  - Nadine Koutcher wins the final, Main Prize of the 2015 Cardiff Singer of the World competition.
  - Amartuvshin Enkhbat is the winner of the Audience Prize of the 2015 Cardiff Singer of the World competition.
- June 22 – The Berlin Philharmonic announces its election of Kirill Petrenko as its next chief conductor.
- June 29
  - The New Zealand Symphony Orchestra announces the appointment of Edo de Waart as its next music director, effective in 2016.
  - The Bayreuth Festival announces the appointment of Christian Thielemann as its music director.
  - The European Union Youth Orchestra announces the appointments of Vasily Petrenko as its next chief conductor effective September 2015, and of Bernard Haitink as its conductor laureate with immediate effect.
- June 30 – The Sinfonieorchester Basel announces the appointment of Ivor Bolton as its next chief conductor, as of the 2016–2017 season, with an initial contract of four years.
- July 2 – The Beethoven Orchester Bonn announces the appointment of Christof Perick as its interim Generalmusikdirektor for the 2016–2017 season.
- July 3 – The Deutsches Nationaltheater and Staatskapelle Weimar announce the appointment of Kirill Karabits as its next Generalmusikdirektor (GMD) and chief conductor, effective with the 2016–2017 season, with an initial contract of three years.
- July 10 – English National Opera announces the departure of John Berry as artistic director.
- August 6 – The Ames Stradivarius violin, stolen from Roman Totenberg in 1980, is returned to Totenberg's family in New York City.
- August 7 – The Spartanburg Philharmonic Orchestra announces that Sarah Ioannides is to conclude her tenure with the orchestra after the 2016–2017 season.
- August 13
  - The Lucerne Festival announces the appointment of Riccardo Chailly as the next music director of the Lucerne Festival Orchestra, effective with the 2016 Lucerne Festival, with an initial contract of five years.
  - The Metropolitan Opera announces that Mary Jo Heath is to be the new radio host for the Metropolitan Opera Saturday radio broadcasts, effective in September 2015.
- August 17 – The Lahti Symphony Orchestra announces the appointment of Dima Slobodeniouk as its next principal conductor, effective in the autumn of 2016, with an initial contract of three seasons.
- August 24 – The Theater Bonn announces the appointment of Jacques Lacombe as the new chief conductor of Bonn Opera, effective with the 2016–2017 season, with an initial contract of two years.
- September 2 – La Monnaie announces the appointment of Alain Altinoglu as its next music director, effective January 2016.
- September 3 – The Leipzig Gewandhaus Orchestra announces that Riccardo Chailly is to conclude his tenure as Gewandhauskapellmeister in June 2016, four years ahead of their most recent contract agreement.
- September 4
  - At a conference of the International Musicological Society in Saint Petersburg, Russia, Natalya Braginskaya announced the re-discovery of an early orchestral work of Igor Stravinsky, Pogrebal'naya Pesnya (Funeral Song), which had gone missing since its only performance in January 1909.
  - The Lucerne Festival announces the appointments of Wolfgang Rihm as the new director of the Lucerne Festival Academy, and of Matthias Pintscher as principal conductor of the Lucerne Festival Academy.
- September 7 – The Bamberg Symphony announces the appointment of Jakub Hrůša as its next chief conductor, as of the 2016–2017 season, with an initial contract of five seasons.
- September 9 – The Leipzig Gewandhaus Orchestra announces the appointment of Andris Nelsons as its 21st Gewandhauskapellmeister, effective with the 2017–2018 season, with an initial contract of five seasons.
- September 11
  - Arvo Pärt's 80th birthday is celebrated worldwide.
  - The Zuger Sinfonietta announces the appointment of Daniel Huppert as its next chief conductor, effective with the 2016–2017 season.
- September 13 – The Chineke! Orchestra, the first black and minority ethnic orchestra in Europe, gives its ensemble debut concert at the Queen Elizabeth Hall, London.
- September 15
  - The Liechtenstein Symphony Orchestra announces the appointment of Stefan Sanderling as its next chief conductor, effective with the 2016–2017 season.
  - The Colorado Symphony Orchestra announces that Andrew Litton is to stand down from his post as the orchestra's music director after the 2015–2016 season, and to become the orchestra's artistic advisor and principal guest conductor through the 2017–2018 season.
- September 16 – The Cabrillo Festival of Contemporary Music announces that Marin Alsop is to conclude her tenure as its director in August 2016.
- September 18 – The Berlin Radio Symphony Orchestra announces the appointment of Vladimir Jurowski as its next chief conductor.
- September 21
  - English National Opera formalises the full appointments of Harry Brünjes as chairman, with immediate effect, and of Cressida Pollock as chief executive officer, for an additional three years.
  - The Munich Chamber Orchestra announces the appointment of Clemens Schuldt as its next principal conductor, effective with the 2016–2017 season, with an initial contract of three years.
  - The Dalasinfoniettan announces the appointment of Daniel Blendulf as its next chief conductor, with immediate effect, with an initial contract of three years.
- September 22 – San Francisco Opera announces the appointment of Matthew Shivlock as its 7th general director, effective July 2016.
- September 23 – Welsh National Opera announces the appointments of Tomáš Hanus as its next music director as of the 2016–2017 season, and of Carlo Rizzi as its conductor laureate with immediate effect.
- September 27 – The world premiere of the eight-hour version of Sleep, composed by Max Richter in collaboration with David Eagleman, occurred at the Wellcome Collection and was broadcast live on BBC Radio 3, the single longest musical composition ever broadcast live in the history of the BBC.
- October 1
  - Gotham Chamber Opera announces immediate cessation of operations, because of a fiscal deficit that the company judged itself unable to redeem.
  - The Memphis Symphony Orchestra announces the appointment of Robert Moody as its new principal conductor, effective with the 2016–2017 season, with an initial contract of two years.
  - PIAS officially takes full control of the music assets of harmonia mundi.
- October 5 – Camerata Notturna announces the appointment of Gemma New as its next principal conductor.
- October 6 – The Iceland Symphony Orchestra announces the appointment of Yan Pascal Tortelier as its next chief conductor, effective with the 2016–2017 season, with an initial contract of three years.
- October 8 – The Deutsches Symphonie-Orchester Berlin announces the appointment of Robin Ticciati as its next principal conductor, effective with the 2017–2018 season, with an initial contract of five years.
- October 13 – The Berlin Philharmonic Orchestra announces that Kirill Petrenko is formally to begin his tenure as its new chief conductor with the 2019–2020 season.
- October 14 – Opera Lyra Ottawa announces immediate cessation of operations, citing insufficient revenue and funding.
- October 23 – The Queensland Symphony Orchestra announces the appointment of Alondra de la Parra as its first-ever music director, effective in 2017, the first conductor ever to have the title of music director with an Australian orchestra, and the orchestra's first female conductor in a leadership post.
- November 5 – The Royal Philharmonic Society announces Martha Argerich as the 101st recipient of the Royal Philharmonic Society Gold Medal.
- November 9 – Opera Theatre of Saint Louis announces that music director Stephen Lord is to stand down from the post after the 2017 season, and to take the title of music director emeritus.
- November 11 – Orchestras Live announces the appointment of Sarah Derbyshire as its next chief executive.
- November 16 – The New Jersey Symphony Orchestra announces the appointment of Xian Zhang as its 14th music director, as of the 2016–2017 season, with an initial contract of four years.
- November 17 – Glyndebourne Festival Opera announces the appointment of Sebastian F. Schwarz as its next general director, effective in May 2016.
- November 18
  - The Three Choirs Festival announces the appointment of Alexis Paterson as its new chief executive, effective in January 2016.
  - The Staatsorchester Rheinische Philharmonie announces the appointment of Garry Walker as its next chief conductor, effective with the 2017–018 season.
- November 24 – The Grawemeyer Foundation announces Hans Abrahamsen as the winner of the 2016 Grawemeyer Award for Music Composition, for his song cycle let me tell you.
- December 1 – The BBC National Orchestra of Wales announces the appointment of Xian Zhang as its next principal guest conductor, the first female conductor ever named to a titled post with any BBC orchestra.
- December 2 – Birmingham Contemporary Music Group announces the appointment of Christoph Trestler as its new chair.
- December 3 – The Detroit Symphony Orchestra announces that Leonard Slatkin is to conclude his tenure as the orchestra's music director after the 2017–018 season, and subsequently to take the title of music director emeritus.
- December 5 – Nikolaus Harnoncourt announces via his website that he is retiring from conducting, the day before his 86th birthday, wi–h a handwritten note scanned to his website. This note is reproduced in the concert programme of the Concentus Musicus Wien the next day at the Musikverein, Vienna, on the actual day of his 86th birthday.
- December 8 – The Royal Liverpool Philharmonic Orchestra announces Bethan Morgan-Williams as the winner of its first annual Christopher Brooks Composition Prize.
- December 9 – The Royal Opera House, Covent Garden announces that Kasper Holten is to leave the post of director of music in March 2017.
- December 16 – The Bulgarian National Radio Symphony Orchestra announces the appointment of Rossen Gergov as its next chief conductor, effective January 2016.
- December 22 – Anonymous 4 gives their final live concert performance at the Metropolitan Museum of Art in New York City before formally disbanding.
- December 29 – Myung-whun Chung submits his resignation as music director of the Seoul Philharmonic Orchestra.
- December 30 – Angela Hewitt is appointed a Companion of the Order of Canada.
- December 31
  - New Year's Honours 2016
    - Radu Lupu is made a Commander of the Order of the British Empire.
    - Steuart Bedford, Leslie East, Malcolm Martineau and Helen Odell-Miller are each made an Officer of the Order of the British Empire.
    - Catherine Arlidge, Alina Ibragimova, Michael McCarthy, and Michael Rafferty are each made a Member of the Order of the British Empire.
  - Finchcocks Musical Museum in Goudhurst closes permanently.

== New works ==
The following composers' works were composed, premiered, or published this year, as noted in the citation.

=== A ===
- Hans Abrahamsen – Left, alone
- John Adams
  - Second Quartet
  - Scheherazade.2 (symphony for violin and orchestra)
- John Luther Adams – Across the Distance
- Eleanor Alberga – Arise, Athena!
- Julian Anderson
  - In lieblicher Bläue (Violin Concerto)
  - Van Gogh Blue
- B Tommy Andersson – Pan
- Timo Andres – Strong Language (for string quartet)
- Cathy Applegate – Piano Concertantrum (composed 2012–2013; premiered March 2015)
- Richard Ayres – No 48 (In the Night Studio)

=== B ===
- David Balasanyan
  - Six Microludes, for piano
  - Monument, for piano and tape
- Guy Barker – The Lanterne of Light
- Gerald Barry – The One-Armed Pianist
- Sally Beamish – "Be still" (Introit)
- Luke Bedford
  - Instability
  - Saxophone Quartet
- Fiona Bennett – The New Lady Radnor's Suite
- Judith Bingham
  - Ghostly Grace
  - Zodiack
- Harrison Birtwistle
  - The Cure
  - The Silk House Sequences
- Victoria Borisova-Ollas – ... and time is running past midnight ...
- Mark Bowden and Owen Sheers – A Violence of Gifts
- Luc Brewaeys – Sonnets to Sundry Notes

=== C ===
- Gary Carpenter – Dadaville
- Elliott Carter – The American Sublime
- Friedrich Cerha – Piccola Commèdia
- Unsuk Chin – Mannequin – Tableaux vivants for orchestra
- Pete Churchill – Echoes: A Song of Poland
- James Clapperton – Northern Sky
- Anna Clyne – The Seamstress
- Edward Cowie – Three Spitfire Motets
- Paul Crabtree – O Icarus
- Laurence Crane – Chamber Symphony No 2 ("The Australian")

=== D ===
- Richard Danielpour – Of Love and Longing
- Tansy Davies – Re-greening
- Luis de Pablo - Pensieri (Rhapsody for Flute and Orchestra)
- Bryce Dessner – Quilting
- Zosha Di Castri – Dear Life
- Hugues Dufourt – Ombre portée
- Frédéric Durieux – Entscheiden
- Richard Dünser – Entreacte
- Benjamin Dwyer - Nocturnal, after Benjamin Britten

=== E ===
- Jason Eckardt - Practical Alchemy
- Benjamin Ellin – Miyabi – Concerto for Violin and Orchestra
- Thierry Escaich – Concerto for Orchestra

=== F ===
- Mohammed Fairouz – Locales (composed 2014; premiered February 14, 2015)
- Ivan Fedele – Hommagesquisse
- David Fennessy – Hirta Rounds
- Lorenzo Ferrero
  - Country Life, for saxophone and piano
  - A Night in Nashville, for saxophone and piano
- Michael Finnissy – Janne
- Alan Fletcher
  - Concerto for Oboe and Orchestra
  - On a winter's night a traveler
- Cheryl Frances-Hoad – From the Beginning of the World
- Peter Fribbins – Violin Concerto
- Vivian Fung – Violin Concerto No 2 ('Of Snow and Ice')

=== G ===
- Michael Gandolfi – Ascending Light
- Philip Glass – Concerto for Two Pianos
- Alexander Goehr
  - Variations (Homage to Haydn), for solo piano
  - Seven Impromptus, Op. 96, for two pianos
- Iain Grandage – Dances with Devils (percussion concerto)
- Helen Grime – Concerto for clarinet and trumpet
- HK Gruber – into the open...
- Barry Guy – Mr Babbage is Coming to Dinner

=== H ===
- Georg Friedrich Haas
  - "I can't breathe" (In memoriam Eric Garner)
  - Saxophone Quartet
- Chris Paul Harman – Lieder und Arien
- Jennifer Higdon
  - Civil Words
  - Viola Concerto
- Robin Holloway
  - Soldered Schumann
  - Silvered Schubert
  - Europa and the Bull (tuba concerto)
- James Horner – Collage: A Concerto for Four Horns and Orchestra
- Emily Howard – Afference
- James Newton Howard – Violin Concerto
- Philippe Hurel – Inserts

=== I ===
- Márton Illés – Re-akvarell (concerto for clarinet and orchestra)

=== J ===
- Marisol Jiménez - XLIII – MEMORIAM VIVIRE
- Betsy Jolas – Ravery Pour Pierre en ce jour

=== K ===
- Darryl Kubian – O for a Muse of Fire
- György Kurtág – Petite musique solennelle en hommage à Pierre Boulez 90

=== L ===
- Libby Larsen – The Birth Song Cycle
- James Ledger and Paul Kelly – War Music
- Joanna Lee - Hammer of Solitude
- Georges Lentz – Jerusalem (after Blake) (composed 2011–2014; premiered January 16, 2015)
- Mica Levi – Greezy
- Magnus Lindberg
  - Accused
  - Violin Concerto No. 2

=== M ===
- Tod Machover – Symphony in D
- Steven Mackey – Mnemosyne's Pool
- James MacMillan
  - A Little Mass
  - Symphony No 4
- Philippe Manoury – Chaconne
- Bruno Mantovani – B
- Colin Matthews and Michael Morpurgo – The Pied Piper of Hamelin
- David Matthews – Symphony No 8
- Melinda Maxwell – Fractures: Monk Unpacked
- Christopher Mayo – Supermarine
- Anna Meredith – Smatter Hauler
- Claudia Molitor – 2TwoLO
- Marc Monnet – bourdonnement, bruissement, bruit, chuchotage, chuchoterie, chuchotis, frémissement, gazouillement, gazouillis, murmure, susurrement...
- Samy Moussa - Crimson
- Nico Muhly
  - Viola Concerto
  - Mixed Messages
  - Sentences
- Dominic Muldowney – Smooth between Sea and Land
- Thea Musgrave – Power Play

=== N ===
- Marc Neikrug:
  - Acequias for Guitar and String Quartet
  - Canta-Concerto
- Andrew Norman
  - Frank's House
  - Switch (percussion concerto)
  - Split (piano concerto)

=== P ===
- Enno Poppe – Zwölf
- André Previn – Nonet

=== R ===
- Torsten Rasch – A Welsh Night
- Wolfgang Rihm
  - Violin Concerto No. 6 (Gedicht des Malers; composed in 2014, premiered in 2015)
  - Über die Linie VIII
  - Con Piano? Certo!
  - Funde im Verscharrten
  - Geste zu Vedova
  - Gruss-Moment

=== S ===
- Kaija Saariaho – Trans
- David Sawer – Coachman Chronos
- Albert Schnelzer – Tales from Suburbia
- Pascal Schumacher – Windfall Concerto (for vibraphone and orchestra)
- Elliott Sharp – Wannsee Noir
- Sean Shepherd:
  - Concerto for Ensemble
  - String Quartet No. 2
- Mark Simpson
  - Israfel
  - The Immortal (text by Melanie Challenger)
- Howard Skempton – The Rime of the Ancient Mariner
- Derrick Spiva – Prisms, Cycles, Leaps
- Johannes Maria Staud
  - Moment, Leute, Moment!
  - Segue II für Pierre Boulez
  - Auf die Stimme der weißen Kreide (Specter I-III)
  - Wasserzeichen (Auf die Stimme der weißen Kreide II)

=== T ===
- Tan Dun – The Wolf (concerto for double bass and orchestra; composed in 2014, premiered in 2015)
- Conrad Tao – An Adjustment
- Augusta Read Thomas – Of Being Is a Bird

=== U ===
- Shiori Usui: Ophiocordyceps unilateralis s.l.

=== W ===
- Errollyn Wallen – Rebuttal Blues No 1
- Bertram Wee – Dithyrambs
- Judith Weir – Good Morning, Midnight
- Lotta Wennäkoski – Päärme, for piano trio
- Jörg Widmann – Viola Concerto
- Michael F. Williams – Letters from the Front
- Michael Wolters – Requiem to Let
- Hugh Wood – Epithalamion

=== Y ===
- Raymond Yiu – Symphony
- Nina C. Young – Agnosco Veteris

== Opera ==
Listed by composer surname.

=== A ===
- Mark Adamo – Becoming Santa Claus
- Matthew Aucoin – Crossing

=== B ===
- Jeremy Howard Beck and Stephanie Fleischmann – The Long Walk
- Per Bloland and Paul Schick – Pedr Solis
- Charlotte Bray and Amy Rosenthal – Entanglement

=== D ===
- Tansy Davies and Nick Drake – Between Worlds
- Johanna Doderer – Fatima, oder von den mutigen Kindern
- Donnacha Dennehy and Enda Walsh – The Last Hotel

=== G ===
- Hans Gefors and Kerstin Perski – Notorious
- Philip Glass and Christopher Hampton – Appomattox (revised version)
- Ricky Ian Gordon and William M. Hoffman – Morning Star

=== H ===
- Georg Friedrich Haas and Jon Fosse – Morgen und Abend
- Jake Heggie and Terrence McNally – Great Scott
- Jennifer Higdon and Gene Scheer – Cold Mountain

=== L ===
- Jimmy López and Nilo Cruz – Bel Canto
- Gilda Lyons and Tammy Ryan – A New Kind of Fallout

=== M ===
- Ben Moore and Nahma Sandrow – Enemies, a Love Story

=== P ===
- Kevin Puts and Mark Campbell – The Manchurian Candidate

=== R ===
- Matt Rogers and Sally O'Reilly – The Virtues of Things

=== S ===
- Daniel Schnyder and Bridgette A. Wimberly – Charlie Parker's Yardbird
- Mauricio Soleto and Andrés Ibáñez – El Público
- Gregory Spears and Royce Vavrek – O Columbia

=== T ===
- Joby Talbot and Gene Scheer – Everest
- Marco Tutino and Fabio Ceresa – La Ciociara (Two Women)

=== W ===
- Derrick Wang – Scalia/Ginsburg

== Albums ==
- Havergal Brian – The Tigers (first commercially issued recording, from 1983 BBC performance)
- Kaija Saariaho – Émilie Suite; Quatre Instants; Terra Memoria
- Ēriks Ešenvalds – "Northern Lights" (Hyperion)
- Rebecca Saunders, Fletch; Benedict Mason, Second String Quartet; Luke Bedford, Wonderful Four-Headed Nightingale; John Zorn, Pandora's Box – Arditti Quartet, Sarah Maria Sun (Col Legno)
- Johann Adolph Hasse – Siroe (first complete recording)
- Liza Lim – The Compass; Pearl, Ochre, Hair String; The Guest
- Kevin Volans – Trio Concerto; Piano Concerto; Symphony "Daar kom die Alibama"
- Mario Capuana, Bonaventura Rubino – Requiem Masses (Namur Chamber Choir)
- Agostino Steffani – Niobe, regina di Tebe
- Mario Castelnuovo-Tedesco – Violin Concerto No 2 (I Profeti), Concerto Italiano
- Nikolai Medtner – Piano Sonatas, 'Ein Idyll'
- Tabea Zimmermann (viola), Thomas Hoppe (piano) – Romance oubliée (Myrios Classics)
- Donnacha Dennehy – Crane; O; The Vandal; Hive
- Ricky Ian Gordon and Royce Vavrek – 27
- Marc Andre – ...auf...
- Félicien David – Le Désert
- Michael Gordon – Dystopia; Rewriting Beethoven's Seventh Symphony
- Tchaikovsky – Piano Concerto No. 1 (world premiere recording of 1879 version) / Prokofiev – Piano Concerto No. 2 (Myrios Classics)
- Hans Abrahamsen – Zählen und Erzählen
- Missy Mazzoli – Vespers for a New Dark Age
- Théodore Dubois – Musique Sacrée et Symphonique
- Wolfgang Rihm – Et Lux
- Judith Weir – Storm
- Krzysztof Penderecki – Magnificat, Kadisz
- Harrison Birtwistle – Angel Fighter, In Broken Images, Virelais
- Lotta Wennäkoski – Soie, Hava, Amor Omnia Suite
- Wartime Consolations : Shostakovich – Sonata for Violin and Piano (unfinished) / Mieczysław Weinberg – Rhapsody on Moldavian Themes (orchestral version) / Karl Amadeus Hartmann – Concerto funebre
- Roger Sacheverell Coke – Preludes and Variations
- Václav Tomášek – Songs
- Bob Chilcott – The Angry Planet
- Jörg Widmann – String Quartets
- John Adams – Absolute Jest, Grand Pianola Music
- Grażyna Bacewicz – String Quartets, Vol 1
- Christopher Simpson – Ayres
- Sadie Harrison – 'Solos and Duos for Piano and Strings'
- Boris Tischenko – Piano Sonatas Nos 7 and 8
- Brett Dean – String Quartets Nos 1 & 2; Five Epitaphs
- David Lang, Luciano Berio, Betty Olivero – Song of Songs
- Paul Hindemith – The Long Christmas Dinner
- Cheryl Frances-Hoad, Gordon Crosse, Piers Hellawell – Bach 2 the Future (Fenella Humphreys, violin)
- Wim Henderickx – Triptych
- Morton Feldman – For Bunita Marcus
- Jonathan Rathbone – Under the Shadow of His Wing
- Heinz Holliger – Machaut Transcriptions
- John Luther Adams – Ilimaq
- Charles Gounod – La Colombe
- Patricia Kopatchinskaja (violin) – Take Two (including music by Jorge Sanchez-Chiong et al)
- Toshio Hosokawa – Voyage VIII et al.
- Michael Nyman – War Work
- Robin de Raaff – Waiting for Miss Monroe
- Jürg Frey – Third String Quartet
- Joseph Kuridka – Beauty and Industry

== Deaths ==
- January 2 – Bob Gilmore, British musicologist, 53
- January 6 – Lawrence Gushee, American musicologist, 83
- January 9 – Colin Sauer, British violinist, 90
- January 10 – Countess Yoko Nagae Ceschina, Japanese-born Italian aristocrat and patroness of classical music, 82
- January 12 – Elena Obraztsova, Russian operatic mezzo-soprano, 75
- January 13 – Frank Glazer, American pianist, 99
- January 19
  - Vera Gornostayeva, Russian pianist and piano teacher, 85
  - Ward Swingle, American singer, 87
- January 27 – Ebbe Grims-land, Swedish viola and mandolin player and composer, 99
- January 29 – Israel Yinon, Israeli conductor, 59
- February 1 – Aldo Ciccolini, Italian-born French pianist, 89
- February 3 – Andrew Patner, American music critic, 55
- February 9 – Marvin David Levy, American composer, 82
- February 13 – John McCabe, British composer and pianist, 75
- February 28 – Ezra Laderman, American composer, 90
- March 1 – Jennifer Ward Clarke, British cellist, 79
- March 19 – Peter Katin, British pianist, 84
- March 22 – Norman Scribner, American choral conductor, 79
- March 24 (killed in the crash of Germanwings Flight 9525):
  - Oleg Bryjak, Kazakh-born German opera singer, 54
  - Maria Radner, German opera singer, 33
- March 28 – Ronald Stevenson, British composer and pianist, 87
- March 29 – Ronald Knudsen, American orchestral violinist and conductor, 83
- April 2 – Dennis Marks, British radio & television producer and opera administrator, 66
- April 3 – Andrew Porter, British music critic, librettist, scholar and editor, 86
- April 5 – Claudio Prieto, Spanish composer, 80
- April 17 – Brian Couzens, British record producer and founder of Chandos Records, 82
- April 27 – Rolf Smedvig, American trumpeter, 62
- April 29
  - Ronald Senator, British-born composer resident in the USA, 89
  - Miriam Brickman, American pianist, 81
- May 2 – Clarice Carson, Canadian soprano, 85
- May 3 – Margaret Garwood, American composer, 88
- May 10
  - Jack Body, New Zealand composer, 70
  - Victor Salvi, American-born harpist and harp manufacturer, 95
- May 28 – Steven Gerber, American composer, 66
- May 29 – Peter Cropper, British violinist and leader of the Lindsay Quartet, 69
- May 31 – Nico Castel, American tenor, comprimario and vocal coach, 83
- June 2 – Günther Schneider-Siemssen, German opera stage designer, 88
- June 3 – Margaret Juntwait, American radio broadcaster and host of the Metropolitan Opera radio transmissions, 58
- June 12 – Ernest Tomlinson, British composer, 90
- June 13 – Ronald Wilford, American artist agency manager and executive, 87
- June 14 – Walter Weller, Austrian conductor and violinist, 75
- June 17 – Neil Courtney, American orchestral double bass player, 82
- June 21 – Gunther Schuller, American composer, conductor, teacher and author, 89
- June 22
  - Joseph de Pasquale, American orchestral violist, 95
  - John (Jack) McCaw, New Zealand-born British orchestral clarinetist, 96
- July 1 – Edward Greenfield, British music critic, 86
- July 7 – Friedemann Weigle, German violist and member of the Artemis Quartet, 52
- July 10 – Jon Vickers, Canadian tenor, 88
- July 15 – Alan Curtis, American harpsichordist, conductor and scholar, 80
- July 19 – David Roth, American opera administrator, 56
- July 21
  - Paul Freeman, American conductor and founder of Chicago Sinfonietta, 79
  - Vera Stern, American arts administrator and arts ambassador, 88
- July 26 – Vic Firth, American orchestral timpanist and percussionist, 85
- July 27 – Ivan Moravec, Czech pianist, 84
- August 2 – J. Durward Morsch, American composer, 94
- August 12 – John Scott, British-born organist and choirmaster resident in the USA, 59
- August 18 – Roger Smalley, British-born composer resident in Australia, 72
- August 22
  - Nikolaus Lehnhoff, Austrian opera director, 76
  - Francis Dillnutt, British classical recording engineer, 91
- August 23 – Per Hjort Albertsen, Norwegian composer, 96
- August 27 – George Cleve, Austrian-born American conductor, 79
- August 30 – Natalia Strelchenko (Strelle), Russian-born pianist, 38
- August 31 – Bruce Lawrence, American orchestral double bassist, 88
- September 5 – Jacques Israelievitch, French-born Canadian orchestral violinist, 67
- September 7
  - Susan Allen, American harpist, 64 (brain cancer)
  - Cor Edskes, Dutch organ builder and restorer, 90
- September 17 – Sir David Willcocks, British choirmaster, 95
- September 28 – Alexander Faris, Irish composer and conductor, 94
- October 1 – Dieter Kober, German conductor, 95
- October 5 – Reinhardt Elster, American opera orchestra harpist, 101
- October 13 – Duncan Druce, British musicologist, 76
- November 2 – Richard Horowitz, American opera orchestra timpanist and crafter of conductor batons, 91
- November 10 – Robert Craft, American classical music writer, conductor, and amanuensis to Igor Stravinsky, 92
- November 16 – Seymour Lipkin, American pianist and conductor, 88
- November 21 – Joseph Silverstein, American orchestra leader (concertmaster) and conductor, 83
- November 23 – Jouni Kaipainen, Finnish composer, 58
- November 28 – Luc Bondy, Swiss theatre and opera stage director, 67
- December 2 – John Eaton, US composer, 80
- December 4 – Rodney Milnes, British opera critic and translator, 79
- December 8 – Mattiwilda Dobbs, American opera singer and recitalist, 90
- December 15 – Stella Doufexis, German mezzo-soprano of Greek ancestry, 47
- December 16 – Aafje Heynis, Dutch soprano, 91
- December 18 – Luc Brewaeys, Belgian composer, 56
- December 19 – Kurt Masur, German conductor, 88
- December 22 – John Duffy, American composer and music administrator, 89

== Major awards ==
- 2015 Pulitzer Prize Winner in Music: Julia Wolfe – Anthracite Fields
- 2015 Grawemeyer Award Winner in Music: Wolfgang Rihm – IN-SCHRIFT 2

=== Grammy Awards ===
- Best Orchestral Performance: John Adams – City Noir, Saxophone Concerto – St. Louis Symphony; David Robertson, conductor (Nonesuch)
- Best Opera Recording: Marc-Antoine Charpentier – La descente d'Orphée aux enfers; Boston Early Music Festival Chamber Ensemble and Vocal Ensemble; Paul O'Dette and Stephen Stubbs, conductors (CPO)
- Best Choral Performance: The Sacred Spirit of Russia – Conspirare; Craig Hella Johnson, conductor (harmonia mundi)
- Best Chamber Music/Small Ensemble Performance: In 27 Pieces: The Hilary Hahn Encores – Hilary Hahn and Cory Smythe (Deutsche Grammophon)
- Best Classical Instrumental Solo: Play – Jason Vieaux (Azica Records)
- Best Classical Solo Vocal Album: Douce France – Anne Sofie von Otter, Bengt Forsberg et al. (Naïve)
- Best Classical Compendium: Harry Partch – Plectra and Percussion Dances (Bridge Records)
- Best Contemporary Classical Composition: John Luther Adams – Become Ocean – Seattle Symphony Orchestra; Ludovic Morlot, conductor (Cantaloupe Music)

=== Juno Awards ===
Classical Albums of the Year:

- Solo or Chamber Ensemble: Béla Bartók – Chamber Works for Violin, Volume 3; James Ehnes et al. (Chandos)
- Large Ensemble or Soloist(s) with Large Ensemble Accompaniment: Wolfgang Amadeus Mozart – Piano Concertos Nos 22 & 24; Angela Hewitt, National Arts Centre Orchestra, Hannu Lintu (Hyperion)
- Vocal or Choral Performance: Franz Schubert – Winterreise; Gerald Finley, Julius Drake (Hyperion)

Classical Composition of the Year: Brian Current – Airline Icarus (Naxos)

=== Gramophone Classical Music Awards 2015 ===
- Baroque Instrumental: JS Bach – Cello Suites; David Watkin, violoncello (Resonus)
- Baroque Vocal: Monteverdi – Vespri solenni per la festa di San Marco; Concerto Italiano, Rinaldo Alessandrini (Naïve)
- Chamber: Smetana – String Quartets Nos 1 & 2; Pavel Haas Quartet (Supraphon)
- Choral: Elgar – The Dream of Gerontius/Sea Pictures; Sarah Connolly, Stuart Skelton, David Soar, BBC Symphony Orchestra and Chorus, Sir Andrew Davis (Chandos)
- Concerto: Beethoven – Piano Concertos Nos 3 & 4; Maria João Pires, Swedish Radio Symphony Orchestra, Daniel Harding (Onyx)
- Contemporary: Per Nørgård – Symphonies Nos 1 & 8; Vienna Philharmonic Orchestra, Sakari Oramo (Dacapo)
- Early Music: 'The Spy's Choirbook'; Alamire, English Cornett & Sackbut Ensemble, David Skinner (Obsidian)
- Instrumental: JS Bach – English Suites Nos 1, 3 & 5; Piotr Anderszewski (Warner Classics)
- Opera: Richard Strauss – Elektra; Evelyn Herlitzius, Waltraud Meier, Adrianne Pieczonka, Mikhail Petrenko, Tom Randle, Orchestre de Paris, Esa-Pekka Salonen; Stage director – Patrice Chéreau; Video director – Stéphane Metge (Bel Air Classique)
- Orchestral: Bruckner – Symphony No 9; Lucerne Festival Orchestra, Claudio Abbado (Deutsche Grammophon)
- Recital: 'A French Baroque Diva'; Carolyn Sampson, Ex Cathedra, Jeffrey Skidmore (Hyperion)
- Solo Vocal: Schubert – 'Nachtviolen'; Christian Gerhaher, Gerold Huber (Sony Classical)
- Recording of the Year: Bruckner – Symphony No 9; Lucerne Festival Orchestra, Claudio Abbado (Deutsche Grammophon)
- Young Artist of the Year: Joseph Moog
- Label of the Year: Channel Classics
- Artist of the Year: Paavo Järvi
- Lifetime Achievement Award: Bernard Haitink

=== British Composer Awards ===
- Amateur or Young Performers: Kate Whitley – Alive
- Choral: James Dillon – Stabat Mater dolorosa
- Community or Educational Project: Stuart Hancock – Snapshot Songs
- Contemporary Jazz Composition: Trish Clowes – The Fox, The Parakeet & The Chestnut
- Large Chamber: Sinan Savaskan – Many stares (through semi-nocturnal Zeiss-Blink) – Module 30
- Liturgical: Michael Finnissy – John the Baptist
- Orchestral: Harrison Birtwistle – Responses: Sweet disorder and the carefully careless
- Small Chamber: Julian Anderson – String Quartet No. 2
- Solo or Duo: Michael Finnissy – Beat Generation Ballads
- Sonic Art: Yann Seznec – Currents
- Stage Works: Julian Anderson – Thebans
- Wind Band or Brass Band: Rory Boyle – Muckle Flugga
