= London Youth Opera =

Opera company for young people 9–18

London Youth Opera (LYO) is an independent opera company in London which produces operas performed by young people aged 9 to 18. Founded in 1971, and previously known as W11 Opera and W11 Children's Opera, it took its former name from its location in W11, a postal district in West London consisting largely of Notting Hill and parts of Holland Park. It changed to its current name in 2023.

Almost all of the productions are new works created by composers such as George Fenton, John Gardner, Richard Harvey, Colin Towns and Timothy Kraemer. Some of these works go on to be revived by schools and other opera companies.

Notable alumni of the company include Eve Best, Jonathan Antoine and Sophie Ellis-Bextor.

== Works commissioned and premiered ==
W11/LYO has commissioned and produced almost 40 new operas, more than any other UK company, providing a repertoire of music theatre for its cast of 9- to 18-year-olds. Each has a running time of just over one hour. Most of the group's commissions are available for performance by schools and music theatre groups.

- 1971 Noye's Fludde* Benjamin Britten, (Chester Mystery play)
- 1972 The Pied Piper Christopher Bowers-Broadbent, Jeremy Hornsby
- 1973 Bel and the Dragon, John Gardner, Timothy Kraemer
- 1974 The Winter Star*, Malcolm Williamson
- 1975 Joseph and the Amazing Technicolor Dreamcoat *, Andrew Lloyd Webber, Tim Rice
- 1976 Like This, Like That, Timothy Kraemer, Peter Dickinson
- 1977 The Adventures of Jonah, Timothy Kraemer, Timothy Kraemer and Peter Dickinson
- 1978 The Girl and the Unicorn, Stephen Oliver, Stephen Oliver
- 1979 Dreamtime, Daryl Runswick, Daryl Runswick
- 1980 Mak the Sheep Stealer*, Herbert Chappell, Don Taylor
- 1981 Wenceslas, Timothy Kraemer, Timothy Kraemer
- 1982 Birthday (revived 1998), George Fenton, Timothy Kraemer
- 1983 Rainbow Planet, Christopher Gunning, Timothy Rose Price
- 1984 The Adventures of Jonah, + Timothy Kraemer, Timothy Kraemer & Peter Dickinson
- 1985 Bel and the Dragon, + John Gardner, Timothy Kraemer
- 1986 The Tin Knight, Francis Shaw, Michael Finch
- 1987 Ulysses and the Wooden Horse, Timothy Kraemer, Timothy Kraemer
- 1988 The Return of Odysseus, David Bedford, David Bedford
- 1989 Koppelberg, Steve Gray, Norman Brooke
- 1990 Double Trouble, Louisa Lasdun, Adam Thorpe
- 1991 A Time of Miracles, Richard Harvey, John Kane
- 1992 Listen to the Earth, Steve Gray, Sarah Shuckburgh
- 1993 Traveller's Tale, Michael Kamen, Michael Kamen
- 1994 Antiphony, (revived 2005), Graham Preskett, John Kane
- 1995 The Dancing Princesses, Bill Connor, Nick Renton
- 1996 Ulysses and the Wooden Horse, + Timothy Kraemer, Timothy Kraemer
- 1997 Eloise, Karl Jenkins, Carol Barratt
- 1999 Rip, Colin Towns, Martin Newell
- 2000 Deep Waters, Cecilia McDowall, Christie Dickason
- 2001 Flying High, Graham Preskett, John Kane
- 2002 Stormlight, David Knotts, Katharine Craik
- 2003 Game Over, Guy Dagul, Jane Aspeling
- 2004 All in the Mind, Edward Lambert, Edward Lambert
- 2005 ANTiphony, + Graham Preskett, John Kane
- 2006 Chincha-Chancha Cooroo, Bernard Hughes, William Radice
- 2007 Shadowtracks, Julian Grant, Tina Jones
- 2008 The Song of Rhiannon, Mark Bowden, Helen Cooper
- 2009 The Whale Savers, Martin Ward, Phil Porter
- 2010 Rain Dance, Stuart Hancock, Donald Sturrock
- 2011 Original Features, Julian Grant, Christina Jones
- 2012 Good Intentions, Julian Philips, Simon Christmas
- 2013 The Fizz, Martin Ward, Phil Porter
- 2014 Deep Waters, + Cecilia McDowall, Christie Dickason
- 2015 Eliza and the Swans, John Barber, Hazel Gould
- 2016 The Price, Russell Hepplewhite, Helen Eastman
- 2017 The Cutlass Crew, Stuart Hancock, Donald Sturrock
- 2018 Shadow Tracks, + Julian Grant, Christina Jones

Note: * not an LYO/W11 Opera commission; + denotes commission revivals
