= The Last Belle =

- Film poster
- Directed by: Neil Boyle
- Written by: Neil Boyle and Jim Maguire
- Produced by: Neil Boyle and Rebecca Neville
- Starring: Amanda Donohoe; Sienna Guillory; Colin McFarlane
- Music by: Stuart Hancock and the Bratislava Symphony Orchestra
- Production company: Hysteria Ltd.
- Release date: October 2011
- Running time: 20 minutes
- Country: United Kingdom
- Language: English

The Last Belle is a 2011 20-minute animated short directed by Neil Boyle. It features the voices of Sienna Guillory, Amanda Donohoe, and Colin McFarlane.

== Summary ==
The story is all about how Rosie found love in London. After her breakup, she is lonely and decides to explore online dating. She finally begins exchanging e-mails with a mysterious beau in an online chatroom for weeks and is excited to hear that he wants to meet her in person one evening. She has been told by him that he lives in a big house, is interested in the arts and fashion, and has had his friends tell him that he bears a strong resemblance to actor Brad Pitt.

The truth is that Wally—her online lover—is a drunk and overweight slob who’s too lazy to work for a living; he watches adult movies and has pin-ups plastered all over his apartment and dresses in loud Hawaiian shirts and wild neckties, and he almost gets away with these lies. He too is looking forward to his date with Rosie, but while waiting to leave, he has one too many cans of beer, resulting in him falling asleep past the time he had intended to leave by. When he finally wakes up, it becomes a race against the clock as Wally is literally thrown out of his apartment and has to endure hallucinations and mishaps at the London Underground system and other obstacles in order to reach his date, while Rosie worries over whether her date will arrive at all. Lucky for her, she unexpectedly finds true love in the end... just not with Wally.

== Cast ==
- Amanda Donohoe as Siobhan, Rosie's friend. She is not seen, but it is implied that she has a husband named Michael and has an infant child.
- Sienna Guillory as Rosie, the main character. She once had a boyfriend but they broke up; fortunately, she gets to know a new boyfriend in a relationship.
- Colin McFarlane as a bartender that Rosie ends up falling for.

Wally has no speaking lines aside from a few grunts and gasping. A fat, drunk, lazy, and unemployed slob who likes watching adult films and dressing in wild Hawaiian shirts and horrendously colorful neckties, the liar comes to visit Rosie to endure the clock turning into a race.

== Production ==
The film took 15 years to make, was shot on 35mm film, and was the final cel animated movie to be ever screened. Notably, Roy Naisbitt, who worked on The Thief and the Cobbler, worked on the underground sequence for this movie.

== Release ==
The film was released in the UK in October 2011. In the USA it was released at the Brooklyn International Film Festival on 1 June 2012.

== Soundtrack ==
The original music score was composed by British composer Stuart Hancock, and the soundtrack EP derived from it was released by MovieScore Media in 2014.
