= Stuart Hancock =

British composer (b. 1975)

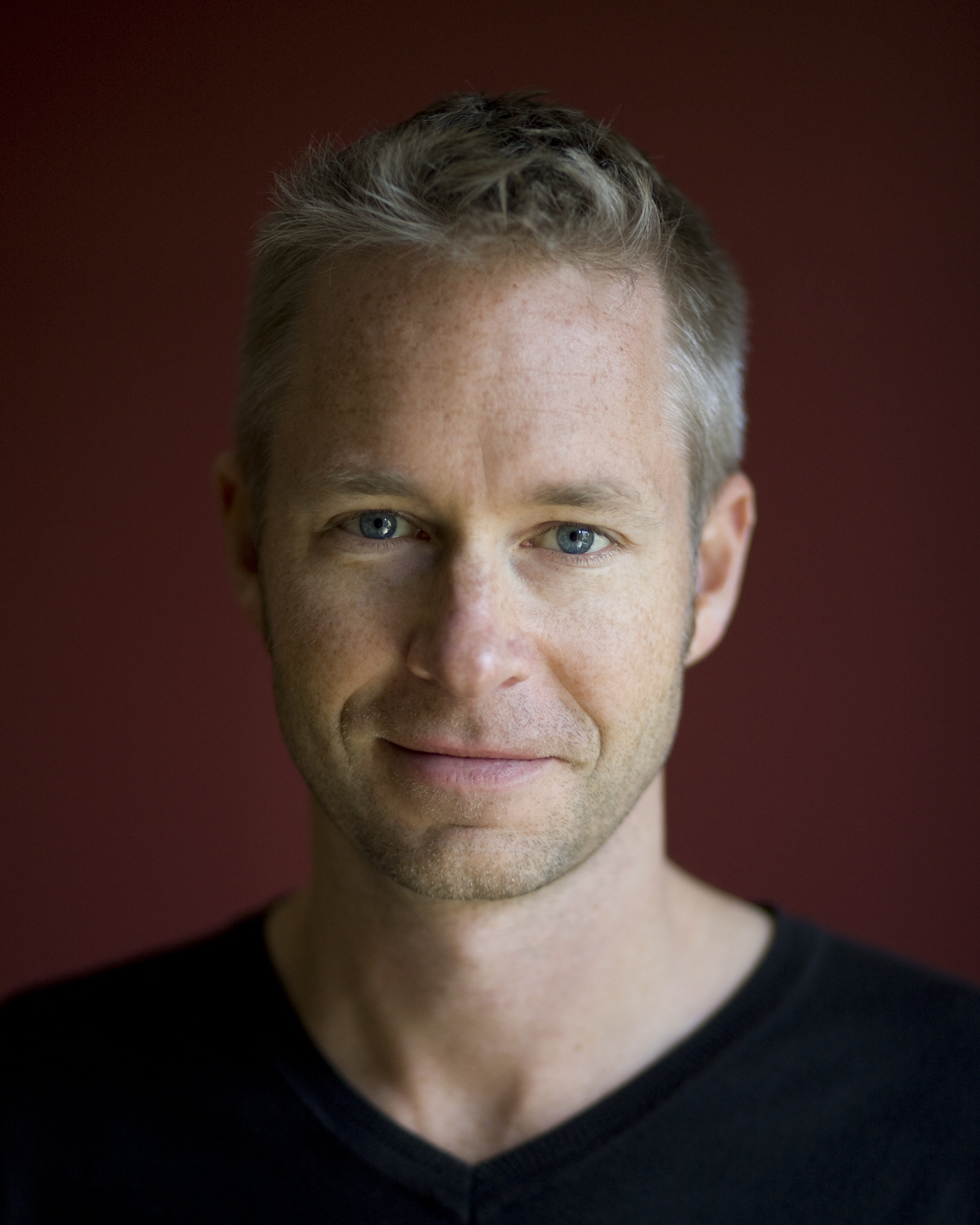
- Stuart Hancock (2015)

Background information
- Occupation: Composer (film/tv/concert/theatre)
- Years active: 1999–present
- Website: http://www.stuarthancock.com

Stuart Hancock (born 5 August 1975) is a British composer of film, TV and concert music. Hancock is known for having composed the original soundtracks to series 2 of the BBC fantasy series Atlantis, the animated TV adaptation of We're Going On A Bear Hunt and the Netflix comedy horror Crazyhead. He won the BASCA British Composer Award in 2015 for his community song-cycle, Snapshot Songs.

== Career ==
Hancock attended Downing College, Cambridge University, earning a BA in Geography. He was the inaugural recipient of the Pomona-Downing Scholarship, studying for an academic year at Pomona College, Claremont, California, US, where he developed his interest in music composition and scored his first film. He subsequently gained a place on the Masters Course in Composition for Film and Television at the London College of Music, graduating with Distinction.

In 1999, Hancock was the winner of the Silent Sounds nationwide competition to be commissioned to re-score music for the 1920s Hollywood silent feature film Lucky Star. The score was premiered live with the film by the Tempus Chamber Orchestra at the Royal Festival Hall on 23 February 2001.

Hancock was a full-time in-house composer for London-based music production company Mcasso Music between 1999 and 2005, during which time he composed and produced music for many national and international advertising campaigns. Whilst at Mcasso, Hancock scored his first two television series: The Lampies, a BBC animated children's series, and series 14 of the ITV drama London's Burning, including co-composing its new theme music. He also worked on incidental music for Aardman's Creature Comforts TV series, and themes and scores for ITV's Challenge of a Lifetime, Guinness World Records, and the reality series Reborn in the USA.

=== Film scores ===
Hancock has provided scores for many independent feature films, with an early credit being EMR for directors Erskine & McCullough in 2004. EMR won the Jury Prize for Best UK Feature at the Raindance Film Festival that year. It also won Best Film at Washington DC Independent Film Festival, the Nuremberg Weekend of Fear, and San Francisco Fearless Tales Genre Fest.

In 2007 and 2008, Hancock scored two mixed martial arts action feature films for director Chee Keong Cheung, Underground (12), and Bodyguard: A New Beginning. Both have had album releases on the MovieScore Media label. The Underground score, in particular, was praised for the strength of its main theme: "Well, simply put, it's fabulous, largely because of its powerful, driving main theme, which dominates the score. It's so rare to find a really memorable main theme in films these days, so when you find one like this, it's precious indeed." "Underground has a good theme; a very good one. Hancock throws it through numerous variations over the course of his score… sending it to very different places, too – it's good to hear a composer take a piece like this and actually do something with it... This is a thoroughly enjoyable album – uncomplicated but satisfying."

Hancock scored the 2010 drama-documentary One Night in Turin, which told the story of the England football team at the Italia 1990 World Cup. A third album release on the MovieScore Media label, Darren Rea of Review Graveyard declared that Hancock's music captured "everything that's great about movie soundtracks. This is an emotional score... Listen out for Stuart Hancock in the future – this is a name you'll hopefully be hearing a lot of."

Hancock's next film score was to accompany the short fantasy film Hawk, directed by MJ McMahon, which premiered at BAFTA in 2011. The music was recorded with the Bratislava Symphony Orchestra, the Côr Cymru winning choir Serendipity, and former Official Harpist to the Prince of Wales, Catrin Finch. On its album release, Hawk's music was widely complimented for its epic ambition and rousing orchestral and choral scoring and would go on to garner Hancock the Best Original Music Score (featurette) at the Idyllwild Cinema Festival, California (2013), a Bronze Medal for Best Impact of Music in a Short Film at the Park City Film Music Festival (2014), and a nomination for Best Film Score at the Jerry Goldsmith Awards 2013.

Later in 2011, Hancock worked with animator Neil Boyle on the score for his animated short The Last Belle. Upon its EP release, the music was praised as "a compact work of pure, distilled charm!" and that "it brings to mind the best of Jerry Goldsmith, Alan Silvestri, Danny Elfman and John Williams but with that unique Hancock twist that his followers have already grown to love… From the first note to the last, this is a meticulously planned masterclass in how to grab the listener's attention." The score was nominated for Best Short Film Score at the Hollywood Music in Media Awards (2013) and won a Gold Medal for Best Impact of Music in a Short Film at the Park City Film Music Festival (2014). Hancock is scoring again for Boyle and co-director Kirk Hendry on Kensuke's Kingdom, the animated feature film adaptation of the Michael Morpurgo book of the same name, due for release in 2022.

In 2015, Hancock scored the short film Killing Thyme for director MJ McMahon, and 'Off to the Vet', a long-form episode of the popular online animated series Simon's Cat. Documentary scores include The Ice King (2018) for BBC Storyville, and Hiroshima & Nagasaki: 75 Years Later (2020) for The History Channel.

==== Jerry Goldsmith Awards ====
At the Jerry Goldsmith Awards 2013, Hancock was nominated in the categories of Best Film Score (for MJ McMahon's Hawk) and Best Documentary Score (for his music to Plants of Qatar/The Desert Treasure, a nature documentary directed for Qatar National Day by Lyndal Davies). Hancock won for Best Documentary Score, and was declared Best Composer overall, receiving his statuette at the Puente Genil ceremony during the International Film Music Festival, Cordoba, Spain, on 26 June 2013. The documentary went on to win the Violetta d'Oro for Best Soundtrack at the Parma International Music Film Festival later the same year, and a Gold Medal for Best Impact of Music in a Documentary at the Park City Film Music Festival, 2014.

Hancock won a further two categories at the Jerry Goldsmith Awards in 2014: Best Song (for 'Take My Hand' from Unknown Heart, with lyrics by Giles Foster), and Best Free Creation (for his re-score of the silent film One Week). His soundtracks for Killing Thyme and We're Going On A Bear Hunt picked up the Best Live Action and Best Animated Film Scores in 2016 and 2017 respectively.

==== ASCAP Foundation Award ====
Following his participation in the 2014 ASCAP Film and Television Scoring Workshop in Los Angeles, Hancock won the ASCAP Foundation Harold Arlen Film and TV award, a special recognition for "excellence, professionalism, musical ability and career potential".

=== Atlantis and Crazyhead ===
In 2014, Hancock was commissioned to score the second series of the BBC fantasy drama Atlantis, which aired on BBC One from November 2014 to May 2015. Produced by Urban Myth Films' Johnny Capps, Julian Murphy and Howard Overman, the series starred Mark Addy, Jack Donnelly and Robert Emms, with Juliet Stevenson as The Oracle, and Sarah Parish as Pasiphae. On 25 November 2015, Morgan Jeffery of Digital Spy announced the forthcoming release of Hancock's Atlantis soundtrack album. On 11 December, Silva Screen Records released the soundtrack on CD and digitally. The album features 30 tracks and 73 minutes of music score from series 2. Reviewed at Synchrotones, Pete Simons wrote "Stuart Hancock's Atlantis is a magnificent work... What is impressive about Atlantis is its big cinematic feel; along with its large orchestral performance...the score sounds vibrant and exciting in a way that many similar scores don't."

Urban Myth Films and creator Overman enlisted Hancock as composer for their next production, the 2016 comedy-horror Crazyhead. Starring Susan Wokoma and Cara Theobold as awkward 20-something demon-hunters, Crazyhead ran for a single 6-episode season on E4 in UK, subsequently released internationally on Netflix. Hancock's score mixed 80s-style electronica and high-energy grunge, and received positive reviews in the soundtrack press.

=== We're Going On A Bear Hunt (animated TV special) ===
Hancock wrote the orchestral score for the 2016 Lupus Films animated TV special We're Going On A Bear Hunt, based on the Michael Rosen/Helen Oxenbury children's book of the same name. The music was recorded by City of London Sinfonia, conducted by the composer, at Abbey Road Studios (studio 1) featuring the London Youth Choir and an end titles song "Me And You" by George Ezra. Now a staple of the festive season television schedules, the show was first broadcast on Christmas Eve 2016 on Channel 4 in the UK, with consolidated viewing figures of 8 million, making it the channel's most watched programme of the year.

In 2019, the Bear Hunt score became a live event, with orchestras performing Hancock's score to big screen projection of the animated film. The premiere was given on 2 February 2019 by the RTE Concert Orchestra at the National Concert Hall Dublin, introduced by Emma O'Driscoll, followed by performances with City of London Sinfonia at the Royal Festival Hall, London, the Royal Welsh College of Music and Drama (Dora Stoutzker Hall, Cardiff) and the Counterpoint Ensemble at the NPAC Weiwuying, Kaohsiung, Taiwan (paired with Howard Blake's The Snowman). Hancock has conducted all performances to date.

=== Concert works ===
Hancock is active as a concert composer. His works include chamber pieces, such as Raptures (a quartet for flute, violin, viola and cello) and Flight Paths (a trio for flute, oboe and piano), as well as larger scale orchestral works, including a Violin Concerto and a Concerto for Two Flutes.

Vocal compositions include the comedic cantata Choir Straits for unaccompanied SATB choir and soloists. With lyrics by Kit Hesketh-Harvey, Choir Straits was premiered by the Bath Camerata and Kit and The Widow at London's Wigmore Hall on 17 December 2009. Making Music commissioned his Folksong Suite for the 2011 Voices Now Festival at the Roundhouse, London, premiered by the Holst Singers conducted by Stephen Layton.

With a libretto by Donald Sturrock, Hancock's youth opera Rain Dance was commissioned and staged by W11 Opera at Riverside Studios in December 2010, featuring the then 15-year-old Jonathan Antoine in a leading role. Rain Dance was subsequently staged in the US by the North Cambridge Family Opera, Massachusetts. W11 Opera commissioned a new operatic work from Hancock and Sturrock for their 2017 season, the result being the Elizabethan pirate romp The Cutlass Crew, staged at the POSK Theatre, London, with a US production performed in April 2023 (delayed by the Covid-19 pandemic from its original April 2020 dates) with North Cambridge Family Opera.

In November 2019, Hancock released his debut album concert works album, entitled Raptures, on the Orchid Classics imprint. It was recorded by the BBC Concert Orchestra at Watford Colosseum, conducted by Levon Parikian. The works included the flamboyant overture Variations on a Heroic Theme, the Violin Concerto (with Jack Liebeck as soloist) and a new orchestral treatment of Hancock's earlier quartet Raptures. The release was warmly received across the classical music press. Michael Beek of BBC Music Magazine described it as "a joyous hour of large lyrical music".

==== Snapshot Songs and British Composer Award ====
In 2012, Hancock became composer-in-residence with the SHM Foundation, a charitable organisation working globally to bring about positive social change through projects in the areas of learning and citizenship, health and the arts. Based on a concept by SHM Foundation trustee Dame Henrietta Moore, Hancock developed and led the composition of Snapshot Songs, a large-scale community song-cycle produced in collaboration with Londoners. The songs featured collaborations with and performances by several London community organisations, including the rappers and poets of creative criminal justice charity Only Connect, the teen ambassadors of HIV support charity Body & Soul, Barbican-Guildhall Creative Learning groups such as Future Band, Drum Heads and the Barbican Young Poets, together with poetry from the likes of Mat Lloyd, Luke Wright and Josh Mowll. Snapshot Songs was performed for the first time at the Milton Court Concert Hall, Barbican, London, on 13 and 14 April 2014, with a diverse 50-strong collaborative community choir, Drum Heads, the London Schools Symphony Orchestra (conducted by Peter Ash), and the composer at the piano. One of the 19 songs, entitled "@IvyBean104", was Hancock's setting of the colourful tweets of internet personality Ivy Bean, who had reputedly been the world's oldest active user of Twitter at the age of 104.

On 9 December 2015, Hancock won the BASCA British Composer Award for Best Community or Educational Project for Snapshot Songs, collecting the award at the BFI Southbank ceremony from celebrated conductor Jessica Cottis. BBC Radio 3 covered proceedings, and excerpts from Snapshot Songs subsequently received airplay on national and local radio.

=== Orchestration ===
Between 2007 and 2013, Hancock worked extensively as an orchestrator, co-composer and conductor of the orchestral scores for several TV movies in the long-running Rosamunde Pilcher and Inga Lindström series, popular in Germany on ZDF. These include the English-language Gate Film productions of A Risk Worth Taking, The Four Seasons, Shades of Love (This September), The Other Wife and Unknown Heart, working with director Giles Foster, and starring many renowned British actors (including Charles Dance, Rupert Everett, John Hannah, James Wilby, Olivia Hallinan, Tim Dutton, Tom Conti, Michael York, Frank Finlay, Juliet Mills, James Fox, Freddie Fox, Harriet Walter, Greg Wise and Jane Seymour).

In 2015, Hancock orchestrated the Hugo de Chaire's score to the British science fiction movie Capsule, directed by Andrew Martin and starring Edmund Kingsley.

== Discography ==
- Underground (2009)
- Bodyguard: A New Beginning (2009)
- One Night in Turin (2010)
- Hawk (2011)
- The Desert Treasure (2014)
- The Last Belle (2014)
- Atlantis (Original Soundtrack from Series 2) (2015)
- We're Going On A Bear Hunt (2016)
- Crazyhead (2017)
- Raptures (2019)

== Awards ==
- 2013 - Jerry Goldsmith Award for Best Composer
- 2013 - Parma International Music Film Festival Violetta d'Oro for Best Soundtrack
- 2014 - ASCAP Foundation Harold Arlen Film and TV Award
- 2015 - BASCA British Composer Award
