= Reginald Redman =

English conductor and composer

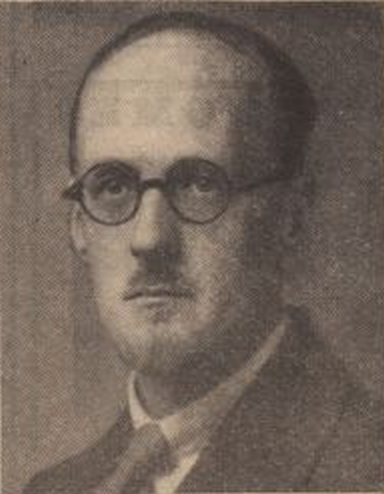
Redman, circa 1935

Reginald Redman (17 September 1892 – 9 March 1972) was an English conductor and composer noted in particular for his contribution to the musical life of the West Country.

== Career ==
Redman was born in London, and became a church organist at the age of 16 while working as a bank clerk, before going on to study at the Guildhall School of Music. For several years he was the organist at Stanmore Parish Church, and music master of the preparatory division at nearby Harrow School. In 1922 he married the pianist Evelyn Amey, and she premiered many of the piano compositions he wrote in the 1920s.

In 1926 he joined the BBC as assistant conductor of the National Orchestra of Wales and from 1936 until 1952 he was the BBC Director of Music, Western Region. While at the BBC in Bristol Redman formed and conducted the West Country Studio Orchestra, a small orchestra which played light music, and the West Country Singers. (He also occasionally conducted the Clifton Light Orchestra and City of Bristol Orchestra). The Studio Orchestra was disbanded in 1950 when the BBC West of England Light Orchestra was formed.

Later in his career Redman became the music critic for the Bristol Evening Post, but also continued to compose music for radio and television, including The Emperor's Nightingale (for marionettes, from a story by Hans Christian Andersen) in 1957, and a TV play The True Mystery of the Passion in 1961. After his death in Bristol, the BBC broadcast a tribute concert, on 27 June 1973, including his Chinese settings, part songs and the violin sonata.

== Compositions ==
Many of his compositions have titles related to the West Country, such as the three movement West Country Suite, first performed at the Torquay Music Festival on 9 October 1935, based on folk tunes from Somerset. But Redman also composed a piano concerto (dedicated to his wife), the first concert performance of which was given in Bournemouth on 15 June 1942, with soloist Moura Lympany, the composer conducting. There was also a cello concerto, a concerto grosso for piano and strings (first performance by the Bristol Sinfonia, January 1972), three operas, two ballets, sacred choral music and chamber music, including a violin sonata. A review of the first performance of his male voice part song On Newlyn Hill (1937) appeared in The Cornishman on 23 December 1937 and is quoted by Stephen Banfield.

Redman was also an expert on Chinese music, and his settings to translations of nearly 50 Chinese poems are particularly noteworthy. Archive material, including musical scores, is held at the University of Bristol.

Light orchestral music, including Away on the Hills, a pastoral piece for string orchestra; Marston Court; From a Moorish village; Pan's Garden; West Country Suite; Rhapsody on Somerset Folk Songs and An Irish Souvenir.

Songs and choral music, including for baritone and orchestra The Forest of Dean and Three Kings of Somerset; many compositions for choir including From the West Countrie, From the Hills of Dream and Songs of the West Country; also sets of Chinese songs Five Chinese Miniatures and Five Settings of Poems from the Chinese.

Piano pieces, including A Cornish Legend; Mist on the Moors; On the Cornish Coast. Many of Redman's piano miniatures, and the more substantial Three Preludes of 1918, have been recorded by Duncan Honeybourne.
