= Sarah Lianne Lewis =

Welsh composer

- Born: Sarah Lianne Lewis; 1988 (age 37–38); Aberystwyth
- Education: Cardiff University School of Music
- Occupation: Composer

Sarah Lianne Lewis (born 1988) is a Welsh composer.

She was commissioned by Heidelberg Music Festival in 2016 and her piece, "I Dared Say It To The Sky", was premiered by soprano, Sarah Maria Sun, and percussionist, Johannes Fischer.

Her piece, "Is there no seeker of dreams that were?", was premiered by BBC National Orchestra of Wales in 2016. Its title is inspired by Cale Young Rice’s poem ‘New Dreams for Old’ and was subsequently performed again by the orchestra in 2018, conducted by Jac van Steen at Hoddinott Hall in Cardiff, and again in 2019 as part of the orchestra's 'BBC Hoddinott Hall @ 10' celebrations, conducted by Holly Mathieson.

In 2018 Lewis was awarded the George Butterworth prize for her work "Blossoms in bloom are also falling blossoms" which was composed through Sound and Music’s Embedded: Composer's Kitchen project with Canadian string quartet Quatuor Bozzini

In 2020, she became the first Composer Affiliate with the BBC National Orchestra of Wales.

In 2025, she won the Medal y Cyfansoddwr (Composers Medal) at the National Eisteddfod in Wrexham. Earlier that year, she won the Royal Philharmonic Society Award for Chamber-Scale Composition, for her solo piano work 'letting the light in'. The work was commissioned by Drake Music Scotland for pianist Siwan Rhys, and released on an NMC Recordings album in Autumn 2024; the first album to feature new music by disabled composers across the UK.
