= Luc Brewaeys =

Belgian musician

Luc Brewaeys (25 October 1959 in Mortsel, Belgium – 18 December 2015 in Antwerp, Belgium) was a Belgian composer, conductor, pianist and recording producer at the VRT (Flemish Radio & Television). He studied composition with André Laporte in Brussels, with Franco Donatoni in Siena (Italy) and with Brian Ferneyhough in Darmstadt (Germany).

== Prizes and distinctions ==
- 3rd prize of the European Competition for Young Composers (1985).
- 1st prize in the category "young composers" from the international tribunal of composers of UNESCO (1986).
- 1st prize "Prix de Musique Contemporaine du Québec" (1988) for the work entière.
- 1st prize for the competition of European composers at the International meeting of contemporary music in Metz (1988).
- The prize for the "Musique de la Communauté Flamande" (1989)
- The SABAM prize (1990)
- 1st prize for "Premio Musicale Città di Trieste" for symphonic composition (1991).

== Works and Discography ==
=== Vocal and Choral works ===
- 2015 On a day 9'
- 2010 speechless song, seeming many, being one ‘Sonnet n° 8’ by William Shakespeare ca. 6'
- 2009 vogliamo inneggiare all’uomo 3'
- 2007 Fantasia con tre canzoni popolare Napoletane 8'
- 2006 L'uomo dal fiore in bocca Opera in one Act ca 45'
- 2003 Jocasta 22'
- 2003 I' vidi / La vita fugge 8'30"
- 2002 Come here, Ulysses 4'30"
- 2000 Credeva... in memoriam Franco DONATONI 14'
- 1999 Schumann's Ghosts 2'35"
- 1991 Antigone Lyric Tragedy ca. 70'
- 1990 Non lasciate ogni speranza 33'20"
- 1989 Réquialm 21'

=== Orchestral works ===
- 2015 …sciolto nel foro universale del vuoto… ca. 17'
- 2008 Shadows with Melodies 15'
- 2007 Symphony n° 7 (2001–02, rev. 2007) 17'
- 2006 L'uomo dal fiore in bocca Opera in one Act ca. 45'
- 2005 Préludes Book II by Claude Debussy recomposed for orchestra 40'
- 2005 Along the Shores of Lorn 12'
- 2004 Préludes Book I by Claude Debussy recomposed for orchestra 40'
- 2004 Symphony n° 8 12' -in pr
- 2002 5 Préludes from Book I by Claude Debussy recomposed for orchestra 16'
- 2000 Credeva... in memoriam Franco DONATONI 14'
- 2000 Symphony n° 6 21'30"
- 1997 Fasten Seat Belts ! Nightmare for Orchestra 4'
- 1996 Introduction 4'40"
- 1993 Laphroaig - Symphony n° 5 27'
- 1993 Talisker 30'
- 1992 Only Very Unusual Matters 3'30"
- 1992 Kientzyphonie (Symphony n° 4) Symphony n° 4 22'
- 1991 Dalì's Dream? 9'
- 1991 Symphony n° 3 : Hommage 10'30"
- 1990 Non lasciate ogni speranza 33'20"
- 1988 Cheers ! 2'30"
- 1987 Komm ! Hebe dich... (Symphony n° 2) Symphony n° 2 15'
- 1985 .., e poi c'era... (Symphony n° 1) Symphony n° 1 15'

=== Chamber music (more than 5 musicians) ===
- 2015 On a day 9'
- 2014 Eppur si muove ca. 11'30"
- 2012 Fêtes à tensions : (les) eaux marchent ca. 15'
- 2009 Double Concerto ca. 15'
- 2008 Cardhu ca. 15'
- 2008 Painted Pyramids 16'
- 2008 Nobody is Perfect ! (Frank Nuyts Fifty) 1'45"
- 2007 Fantasia con tre canzoni popolare Napoletane 8'
- 2006 Mozart's Ghosts 8'
- 2005 Hermesfanfare 2'30"
- 2004 Stolen Silence 4'33"
- 2003 Jocasta 22'
- 2001 Benché nessuno.., sorride 13'30"
- 1999 Schumann's Ghosts 2'35"
- 1999 Beyond the Deadline 2'15"
- 1997 Works by Frank ZAPPA 15'
- 1996 OBAN 10'
- 1996 Nobody is Perfect ! (André Laporte sixty-five) 1'45"
- 1992 Le Concert Music for a film by Samy BRUNETT. 6'
- 1989 Réquialm 21'
- 1986 Due cose belle ha il mondo: l'amore e la morte... 12'
- 1982 Trajet 9'

=== Chamber music (5 or less musicians) ===
- 2008 3 Miniatures 1'
- 2007 Nobody is Perfect ! (Jonathan Harvey Sixty) (1999, rev. 2007) 2'30"
- 2004 Utopia 9'
- 2003 Haydn ? 5'30"
- 2000 Violacello 1'
- 1999 Nobody is Perfect ! (João Pedro Oliveira forty) 3'30"
- 1998 Nobody is Perfect ! (Lukas Foss seventy-five) 4'00"
- 1997 Les Méandres de la Mémoire 12-13'
- 1996 Last Minute Piece 1'30"
- 1995 Bowmore String Quartet nr. 2 17'30"
- 1993 Unicorn Telex 4'30"
- 1992 Jocaste's (grand-) daughter 15'30"
- 1991 Antigone Lyric Tragedy ca. 70'
- 1991 Knockando 8'
- 1989 Namk'Cotts
- 1989 The Zappa Album works by Frank Zappa 42'
- 1989 String Quartet n° 1 15'
- 1988 Aouellaouellaouelle! 10'
- 1988 Works by George GERSHWIN 12'
- 1983 Het Raadsel van de Sfinks (The Riddle of the Sphinx) Music for a film by Jef CORNELIS. 55'
- 1981 Conuflinicty - 1 + 1 = 3 13'30"

=== Solo works ===
- 2013 Ni fleurs ni couronnes : Monument pour Jonathan Harvey ca. 13'
- 2011 Per André L. 80 ca. 3
- 2010 speechless song, seeming many, being one ‘Sonnet n° 8’ by William Shakespeare ca. 6'
- 2009 Fred’s Hallucination 1'
- 2009 Black Rock Unfolding 16'
- 2001 Si sentiva un po' stanco... 6'30"
- 1999 Metastudy 1'
- 1997 Per Roberto F. 6'30"
- 1997 In between... 1'30"
- 1996 Il fiume del tempo passava... 7'30"
- 1996 Nobody is Perfect ! (Michael Finnissy Fifty) 2'30"
- 1995 "... far !.." 2'30"
- 1994 Attention : Alto Solo ! 7'25"
- 1994 Le Chant de la Sirène 5'15"
- 1991 Dirge for Dina 3'30"
- 1991 Jacquerie - Jacques qui rit 5'30"
- 1990 Very Saxy 4'30"
- 1989 Pyramids in Siberia 16'
- 1989 Again 12'
- 1988 Immer weiter, oder..? 5'
- 1982 Parametric Permutations 5'
- 1977 Epitaphium 4'

=== Electronic music ===
- 2013 Ni fleurs ni couronnes : Monument pour Jonathan Harvey ca. 13'
- 2009 Double Concerto ca. 15'
- 2009 Black Rock Unfolding 16'
- 2008 Painted Pyramids 16'
- 2003 Jocasta 22'
- 2000 Symphony n° 6 21'30"
- 1993 Laphroaig - Symphony n° 5 27'
- 1992 Jocaste's (grand-) daughter 15'30"
- 1991 Antigone Lyric Tragedy ca. 70'
- 1989 Metallofonie 30'
- 1986 Due cose belle ha il mondo: l'amore e la morte... 12'
- 1982 Trajet 9'

== Bibliography ==
- BEIRENS, M. "Luc Brewaeys, asceet en veeldoener". Muziek en Woord, no. 336, 2002 (in Dutch). p. 12.
- BEIRENS, M. "Oedipale dramatiek bij Brewaeys. Creatie van Jocasta". Contra., vol. 3, no. 4, 2004 (in Dutch). pp. 41–42.
- DEFEVER, G. "Luc Brewaeys in grote vorm". Muziek en Woord, no. 354, 2004 (in Dutch). pp. 16–17.
- DELAERE, M. "Boem-Paukenslag". Nieuwe Muziek in Vlaanderen, 1997 (in Dutch). pp. 166–171.
- HALBREICH, H. "Les Oeuvres pour Orchestre de Luc Brewaeys". cd-booklet, CYP 2609, 1998 (in French).
- KNOCKAERT, Y. "Luc Brewaeys' Talisker". Apollo en de python - Muziekprogramma Antwerpen '93, Antwerp, 1993 (in Dutch). pp. 50–51.
- KNOCKAERT, Y. "Symfonische eensgezindheid. De symfonie in het oeuvre van Brewaeys, Buckinx, Swerts en Van Hove". Contra. vol. 3, no. 3, 2004 (in Dutch). pp. 46–48.
- VAN EYCKEN, S. "Il fiume del tempo passava. Een traject doorheen de muziek van Luc Brewaeys". Vlaanderen, 1, 1998 (in Dutch). p. 194.
- VAN EYCKEN, S. "Brewaeys Luc: Bowmore (1995)". Contemporary Music in Flanders I Flemish String Quartets since 1950. M. Delaere and J. Compeers, 2004. pp. 25–26.
