= Lotta Wennäkoski =

Finnish composer (born 1970)

Lotta Annukka Wennäkoski (born 8 February 1970) is a Finnish composer.

Wennäkoski was born in Helsinki. She studied the violin at the Béla Bartók Secondary Grammar and Technical School of Music in Budapest, Hungary, in 1989–1990 and music theory and composition at the Sibelius Academy between 1994 and 2000 under Eero Hämeenniemi, Kaija Saariaho and Paavo Heininen and in the Royal Conservatory of The Hague between 1998 and 1999 under Louis Andriessen.

Wennäkoski began her career as a composer by composing for radio plays and short films. A major landmark on her career was a concert at the Musica Nova Helsinki festival in 1999. Her notable works include Sakara for orchestra (2003), commissioned by Esa-Pekka Salonen, the string quartet Culla d’aria (2004), commissioned by the Kuhmo Chamber Music Festival, Hava for chamber orchestra, the flute concerto Soie (2009), one of the recommended works at the UNESCO International Rostrum of Composers in 2012, Verdigris for chamber orchestra (2015), commissioned by The Scottish Chamber Orchestra, and Flounce for orchestra, commissioned by the BBC and performed at the Last Night of the Proms in 2017.

As a composer, Wennäkoski has been described as a lyricist and a lyrical Modernist and post-Expressionist, and she has described herself as "often navigating in an area between exciting timbral qualities and more conventional gestures like melodic fragments".

Wennäkoski acted as the artistic director of the Tampere Biennale festival in 2008 and 2010, as the composer-in-residence of the Tapiola Sinfonietta during the season 2010–2011 and designed the program of the Avanti! Summer Sounds festival in 2017.

== Recordings ==
- Nosztalgiaim, Sade avaa ("Rain opens"), Culla d'aria, Love and Life of a Woman – Avanti! Chamber Orchestra; Tuomas Hannikainen, conductor; Eija Räisänen, soprano; Tanja Kauppinen-Savijoki, soprano; Riikka Rantanen, mezzo-soprano (Alba Records)
- Soie, Hava, Amor Omnia Suite – Kersten McCall, flute; Finnish Radio Symphony Orchestra; Dima Slobodeniouk, conductor (Ondine)
- Balai – Petri Kumela, guitar (Alba Records)
- Limn (2002), solo bass clarinet (Orlando Records)
