= Albert Schnelzer =

Swedish composer (born 1972)

- Born: Johan Albert Schnelzer; 3 June 1972 (age 54); Kristinehamn, Sweden
- Era: Contemporary
- Website: albertschnelzer.se

Albert Schnelzer (born 3 June 1972, Värmland) is a Swedish composer.

As a youth, Schnelzer was a keyboard player in a rock band. He later became a student at the Malmö Academy of Music from 1994 to 2000. His teachers in Sweden included Sven-David Sandström and Rolf Martinsson, and he was a conducting pupil of Gunnar Staern and Lars Jensen. In the UK, Schnelzer studied music at the Royal College of Music, where his teachers included Julian Anderson. He continued his conducting studies with John Carewe.

In 1998, Schnelzer won the "Composer of Tomorrow" competition with the orchestral work Erupto. He joined the Society of Swedish Composers in 2001. He became better known outside of Sweden with his piano trio Predatory Dances, composed on commission from Radio France and premiered at the Présence Festival in 2004.

== Selected Compositions ==
Orchestral and band works:

- Erupto (1998)
- Dance Ecstatic (for string orchestra; 2001)
- Symphony No. 1 ("Azraeel"; 2006)
- A Freak in Burbank (2007)
- Azraeel Suite (for wind orchestra; 2008)
- Emperor Akbar (for string orchestra; 2009/2010)
- Tales from Suburbia (2012)

Concertos:

- Bassoon Concerto No. 1 ("Auroral Dances"; 2006)
- Oboe Concerto ("The Enchanter"; 2009)
- Cello Concerto ("Crazy Diamond"; 2011)
- Brain Damage - Concerto for Orchestra; 2014)

Choral works:

- Academic Millennium Overture (for chorus and orchestra; 1999)
- Räggler å Paschaser - En Körsvit På Mål (for 8-part chorus; 2001)

Chamber music:

- Sekunderm (for violin, clarinet and piano; 1996)
- Konsert (for violin, marimba and wind quintet; 1997)
- Preludium & Fuga (for 3 percussionists, deciduous forest, lamp-post, waste-paper basket and latrine barrel; 1997)
- Driv (for flute, bassoon and piano; 1998 [also for flute, bass clarinet & piano; clarinet, bassoon & piano; clarinet, bass clarinet & piano])
- Four Scenes (for bassoon and piano; 1999)
- Two Miniatures (for flute, cello and guitar; 2000)
- Village Music (for recorder quartet; 2000)
- Waves (for brass ensemble; 2000)
- Raindance (for violin, clarinet, cello and piano; 2001)
- Limpin' Dances (for cello, accordion and piano; 2001)
- Scene II (for bassoon and piano; 2001 [also for bassoon and guitar])
- Scene II (for cello and piano; 2001 [also for cello and guitar])
- Dance of the Fairies (for cello and piano; 2002 [also for violin and piano])
- Frozen Landscape (for cello and piano; 2002 [also for violin and piano])
- Wolfgang Is Dancing! (for violin, clarinet and cello; 2002)
- Thunderdance (for percussion duo; 2002)
- Predatory Dances (for violin, cello and piano; 2003)
- Apollonian Dances (for violin and piano; 2003)
- Spheres (for violin and guitar; 2004)
- Lamento - for the Naughty Children Under the Second Umbrella (for violin, clarinet, cello and prepared piano; 2004)
- Just a Straw-Stuffed Puppet, This Modern Hero! (for saxophone quartet; 2005)
- The Poetry of Madness (for organ and cello; 2006)
- String Quartet No. 1 ("The Devil in the Belfry", 2008)
- String Quartet No. 2 ("Emperor Akbar", 2009)
- Con Forza (brass quintet; 2010)

Solo instrumental music

- Solitude (for violin; 1999) [also for solo cello])
- Dance with the Devil (for piano; 2000)
- Water Dance (for piano; 2003)

Vocal music

- Itaka (for soprano, violin and piano; 2002)
- Requiem (for soprano and piano; 2004)

== CD Recordings ==
- Thunderdance (PSCD 177)
- Spheres (DAPHNE 1027)
- Predatory Dances, Dance with the Devil, Lamento - for the naughty children..., Frozen Landscape (cello & piano version), Wolfgang is Dancing!, Requiem, Solitude (solo cello version) (DAPHNE 1031)
- Frozen Landscape (violin & piano version), Solitude (solo violin version) (CY0701)
- Village Music (CAP 21687)
- Apollonian Dances (PPCD 1001)
- Dance with the Devil (SETTONO 1)
