= BBC National Orchestra of Wales =

Welsh symphony orchestra founded in 1928

- Symphony orchestra
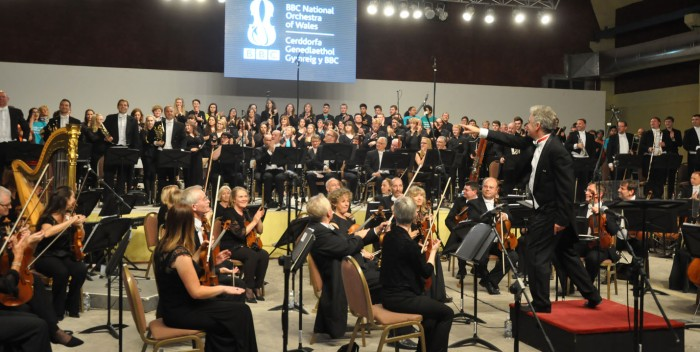
- The BBC National Orchestra of Wales performing in Trelew, Chubut Province, Argentina.
- Native name: Cerddorfa Genedlaethol Gymreig y BBC
- Short name: BBC NOW
- Founded: 1928
- Location: BBC Hoddinott Hall
- Concert hall: St. David's Hall
- Principal conductor: (post vacant)
- Website: BBC NOW

The BBC National Orchestra of Wales (BBC NOW) (Welsh: Cerddorfa Genedlaethol Gymreig y BBC) is a Welsh symphony orchestra and one of the BBC's five professional radio orchestras. The BBC NOW is the only professional symphony orchestra organisation in Wales, occupying a dual role as both a broadcasting orchestra and national orchestra. The BBC NOW has its administrative base in Cardiff, at the BBC Hoddinott Hall on the site of the Wales Millennium Centre, since January 2009.

The BBC NOW is the orchestra-in-residence at St David's Hall, Cardiff, and also performs regularly throughout Wales and beyond, including international tours and annual appearances at the Royal Albert Hall in London at the BBC Proms. Broadcasting work includes studio sessions for BBC Radio and television, although the orchestra's concerts form the bulk of its broadcasts, transmitted primarily on BBC Radio 3 but also on BBC Radio Wales, BBC Radio Cymru and BBC Television. The orchestra has recorded many soundtracks for BBC television, including Doctor Who, Torchwood, Human Planet, and Earthflight.

== History ==
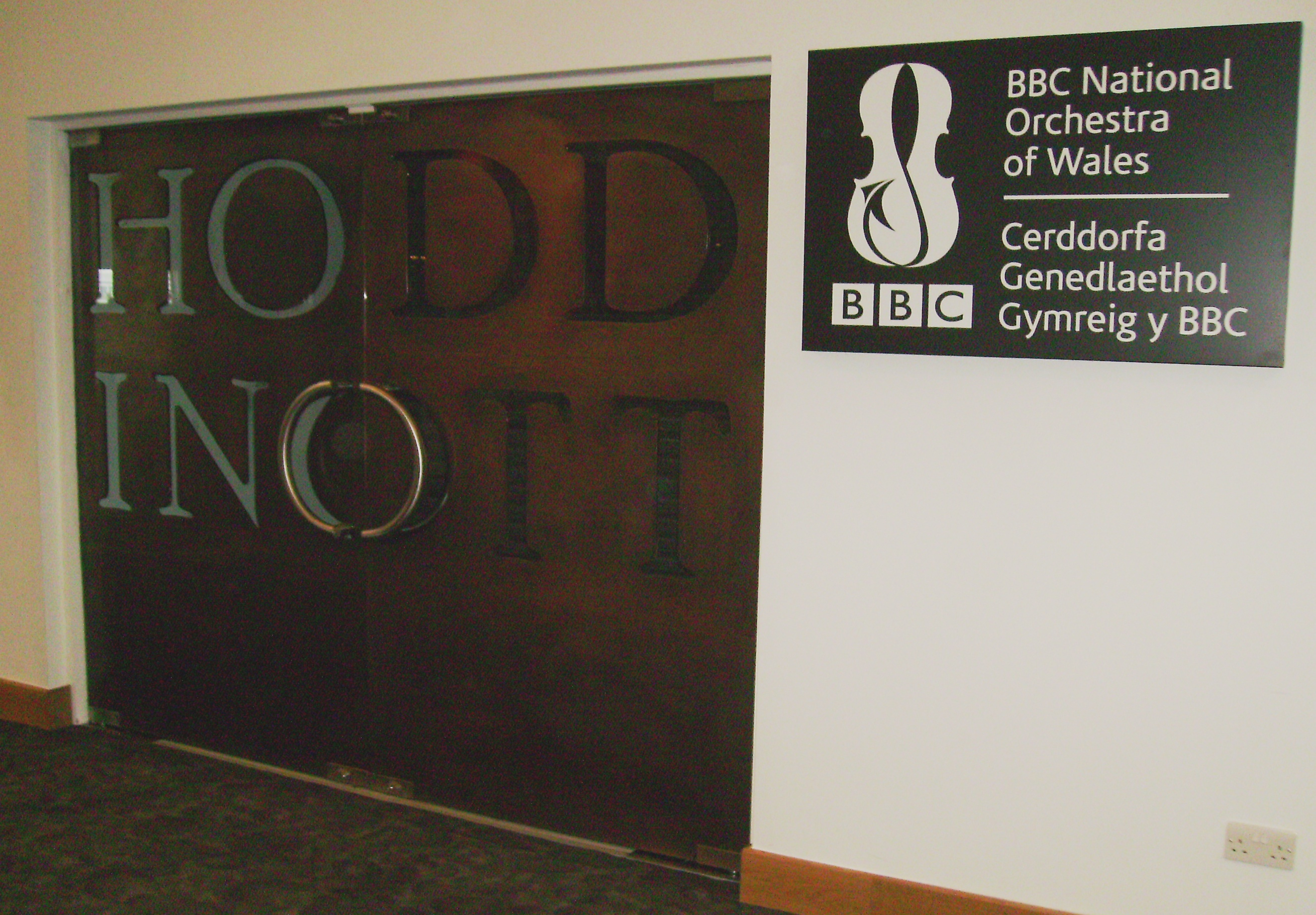
Entrance to the BBC Hoddinott Hall

The precursor ensemble of the BBC NOW was the Cardiff Station Orchestra, which was founded in 1924 and had developed into the National Orchestra of Wales by 1928. Funding problems resulted in the disbandment of this orchestra in 1931. In 1935, the BBC Welsh Orchestra was established as a 20-member ensemble, but the orchestra was dissolved with the advent of the Second World War in 1939. After the war, the BBC Welsh Orchestra was revived as a 31-member ensemble, with Mansel Thomas as its first principal conductor. In 1947, the BBC Welsh Chorus was founded as the affiliate chorus of the orchestra. The orchestra's ensemble size increased steadily, reaching 44 musicians in the 1960–1961 season, 60 musicians in 1974, and 66 musicians in 1976, when the orchestra's name was changed to the BBC Welsh Symphony Orchestra. It reached a full symphonic complement of 88 players in 1987 before being reduced to its current level of 78 players in 2014 as part of BBC savings delivered by the Director at the time, Michael Garvey, who also made reductions to the administrative and management team through redundancies. In the 1970s, a new chorus to supplant the former BBC Welsh Chorus, the BBC Welsh Choral Society, was established. In 1993, the orchestra was renamed the BBC National Orchestra of Wales, to reflect more suitably its special role as both a national orchestra and a BBC Performing Group. In parallel, the chorus was renamed the BBC National Chorus of Wales. Both the orchestra and the chorus engage in outreach work through their Education and Community Outreach department, which creates access to the players and singers for Welsh schools, groups, communities and musicians of all abilities.

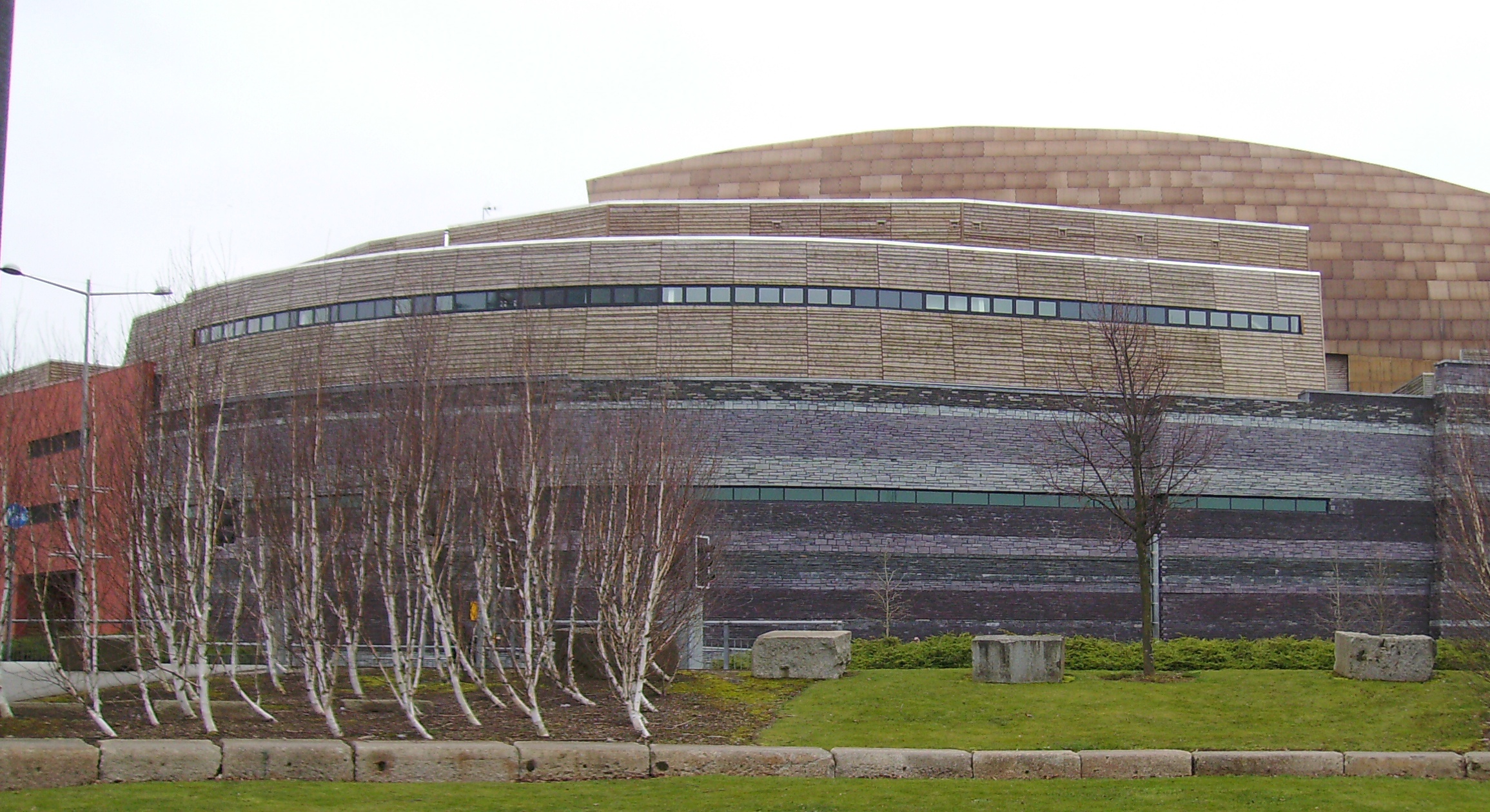
The BBC Hoddinott Hall

Tadaaki Otaka, principal conductor from 1987 to 1995, is currently the BBC NOW's conductor laureate. Richard Hickox, principal conductor from 2000 to 2006, was the orchestra's conductor emeritus until his death in November 2008. On July 2011, the BBC NOW announced the appointment of Thomas Søndergård as its 14th principal conductor, effective with the 2012–2013 season, for an initial contract of 4 years. In February 2016, the BBC NOW announced the further extension of Søndergård's contract as principal conductor through "at least 2018". Søndergård formally concluded his tenure as principal conductor in July 2018.

Past principal guest conductors have included Mariss Jansons, James Loughran and Jac van Steen. François-Xavier Roth was the past associate guest conductor of the BBC NOW. In December 2015, the BBC NOW announced the appointment of Xian Zhang as its principal guest conductor, the first female conductor named to a titled post with any BBC orchestra, effective with the 2016–2017 season, with an initial contract of 3 years. Past Composers-in-Association have included B Tommy Andersson. Huw Watkins became the BBC NOW's Composer-in-Association, beginning in 2015. In September 2020, Gavin Higgins was announced as the BBC NOW's new composer-in-association. Adrian Partington is the current artistic director of the BBC National Chorus of Wales.

In November 2018, Ryan Bancroft first guest-conducted the BBC NOW, as an emergency substitute for Xian Zhang. He returned as guest conductor to the BBC NOW in May 2019. In September 2019, the BBC NOW announced the appointment of Bancroft as its next chief conductor, effective with the 2020–2021 season, with an initial contract of 3 years. Bancroft concluded his tenure with the BBC NOW at the close of the 2025–2026 season.

Previous Directors of the BBC NOW and the BBC National Chorus of Wales have included Huw Tregelles-Williams, David Murray (responsible for the building of Hoddinott Hall) and Michael Garvey. In September 2019, the BBC announced the appointment of Lisa Tregale as the new Director of the BBC NOW and the BBC National Chorus of Wales, effective in 2020. Tregale is the first woman to be named to the post.

In 2023, members of the orchestra were selected to play at the coronation of Charles III and Camilla. The orchestra's current principal guest conductor is Jaime Martín, effective with the 2024–2025 season.

== Discography ==
In addition to its recording work for the BBC, the BBC National Orchestra of Wales has an extensive commercial discography with such labels as Chandos, Hyperion and Linn. These include recorded cycles of music of Lennox Berkeley and Michael Berkeley, Frank Bridge, and Edmund Rubbra.

The BBC NOW discography includes:

- Tippett: The Rose Lake; Ritual Dances from The Midsummer Marriage [CHSA 5039]
- Elgar: Symphony No 2; In The South (Alassio) [CHSA 5038]
- Sullivan: Trial by Jury; Cox and Box [CHSA 10321]
- Bridge: "Orchestral Works, Vol. 6" [CHAN 10310]
- Walton: Christopher Columbus; Hamlet and Ophelia [CHSA 5034]
- Parry: "Works for Chorus and Orchestra" [CHAN 10740] – nominated for Best Choral Performance at the 2014 Grammy Awards
- Stravinsky: "Ballets Russes"
- Holst: "Orchestral Works, Vol. 1" [CHSA 5069]
- Michael Shapiro: Archangel, Concerto for Piano and Orchestra [Paumanok]

== World Premieres ==
Works premiered by the orchestra include:

- 1936 – Grace Williams: Elegy for String Orchestra
- 1936 – Arwel Hughes: Fantasia for Strings
- 1947 – Grace Williams: Sea Sketches
- 1950 – Grace Williams: Violin Concerto (Granville Jones, soloist)
- 1950 – David Wynne: Rhapsody Concerto for Violin and Orchestra (Jan Sedivka, soloist)
- 1950 – Alun Hoddinott: Concerto for Clarinet and String Orchestra (Fred Clements, soloist)
- 1953 – David Wynne: Elegy for Solo Violin and Strings (Jan Sedivka, soloist)
- 1955 – David Wynne: Prelude, Air and Dance
- 1961 – David Wynne: A Welsh Suite
- 1962 – Alun Hoddinott: Job
- 1964 – David Wynne: Fantasia Concerto for Viola and Orchestra (Geoffrey York, soloist)
- 1965 – David Wynne: Cymric Rhapsody No. 1
- 1967 – Grace Williams: Carillons (Concertino for Oboe and Orchestra) (Philip Jones, oboe soloist)
- 1967 – David Wynne: Octad
- 1968 – David Wynne: Prelude for Orchestra
- 1969 – Alun Hoddinott: Nocturnes and Cadenzas (Raphael Sommer, cello soloist)
- 1972 – Alun Hoddinott: The Hawk Is Set Free
- 1975 – Alun Hoddinott: Landscapes
- 1978 – Alun Hoddinott: Voyagers
- 1980 – Alun Hoddinott: The Heaventree of Stars (Christopher Warren-Green, violin soloist)
- 1981 – Alun Hoddinott: Lanternes Des Morts
- 1984 – Alun Hoddinott: Symphony No. 6
- 1988 – Alun Hoddinott: Tarantella (Ieuan Jones, harp soloist)
- 1989 – Alun Hoddinott: Songs of Exile (Robert Tear, tenor soloist)
- 1989 – Alun Hoddinott: Star Children
- 1989 – Alun Hoddinott: Symphony No. 7
- 1990 – Alun Hoddinott: Emynau Pantycelyn
- 1993 – Alun Hoddinott: Symphony No. 9
- 1995 – Alun Hoddinott: Concerto No. 2 for Violin and Orchestra (Dong-Suk Kang, violin soloist)
- 1996 – Anthony Powers: Symphony No. 1
- 1997 – Unsuk Chin: Piano Concerto
- 1999 – Alun Hoddinott: Symphony No. 10
- 2002 – Alun Hoddinott: Lizard
- 2002 – David Matthews: Concerto in Azzurro
- 2004 – Alun Hoddinott: Badger in the Bag (Broch Ynghod)
- 2004 – Alun Hoddinott: Trombone Concerto (Mark Eager, soloist)
- 2007 – Giles Swayne: Symphony No. 1 (a small world)
- 2007 – Alun Hoddinott: Images of Venice (Helen Field, soprano soloist; Jeremy Huw Williams, baritone soloist)
- 2007 – John McCabe: Horn Concerto ('Rainforest IV') (David Pyatt, soloist)
- 2007 – David Matthews: Symphony No 6
- 2009 – Alun Hoddinott: Taliesin
- 2010 – Arvo Pärt: In spe
- 2010 – Arlene Sierra: Piano Concerto (Art of War)
- 2010 – Simon Holt: Centauromachy (Philippe Schartz, flugelhorn soloist; Robert Plane, clarinet soloist)
- 2011 – Christopher Painter: Furnace of Colours, (Claire Booth, soprano soloist)
- 2011 – Mark Bowden: lyra
- 2013 – Simon Holt: The Yellow Wallpaper
- 2015 – B Tommy Andersson: Pan
- 2016 – John Pickard: Symphony No 5
- 2018 – Huw Watkins: Spring
- 2019 – Jonny Greenwood: Horror vacui

== Principal conductors ==
- Warwick Braithwaite (1928–1931)
- Reginald Redman (1931–1935)
- Idris Lewis (1935–1939)
- Mansel Thomas (1946–1950)
- Rae Jenkins (1950–1965)
- John Carewe (1966–1971)
- Boris Brott (1972–1978)
- Bryden Thomson (1979–1982)
- Erich Bergel (1983–1985)
- Tadaaki Otaka (1987–1995)
- Mark Wigglesworth (1996–2000)
- Richard Hickox (2000–2006)
- Thierry Fischer (2006–2012)
- Thomas Søndergård (2012–2018)
- Ryan Bancroft (2020–2026)

== Leaders ==
- Lesley Hatfield (2004–present)

== Composers in association ==
- Michael Berkeley (2001–2008)
- Simon Holt (2008–2014)
- B. Tommy Andersson (2014–2015)
- Huw Watkins (2015–2020)
- Gavin Higgins (2020–present)

== Resident composers ==
- Guto Puw (2006–2010)
- Mark Bowden (2011–2015)
- Sarah Lianne Lewis (Composer Affiliate, 2020–2024)

== Sources ==
- "The BBC National Orchestra of Wales: A Celebration", Peter Reynolds (BBC, 2009)
