= Zosha Di Castri =

Canadian composer and pianist

- Born: 1985 (age 40–41); Calgary, Alberta, Canada
- Education: McGill University; Columbia University
- Occupations: Composer, pianist
- Awards: Guggenheim Fellowship (2021)

Zosha Di Castri (born 1985) is a Canadian composer and pianist living and working in New York. She is the Francis Goelet Assistant Professor of Music at Columbia University. Her work came to international attention when a specially commissioned piece about the lunar landings opened the BBC Proms 2019.

== Early life and education ==
Di Castri was born in Calgary, Alberta, and grew up in St. Albert. She completed her bachelor's of music in piano performance and composition at McGill University, and graduated from Columbia University with a Doctor of Musical Arts degree.

== Career ==
Di Castri became an assistant professor of music at Columbia in 2014. In 2015 her work Dear Life was premiered by the National Arts Centre orchestra. Her work has also been performed by the San Francisco Symphony, New World Symphony, Toronto Symphony Orchestra, Orchestre Symphonique de Montreal, and the BBC Symphony Orchestra.

On 19 July 2019 her specially commissioned work Long is the Journey, Short is the Memory opened the BBC Proms 2019 with the BBC Symphony Orchestra and the BBC Singers conducted by Karina Canellakis. Reviewers praised the composition, and commented on Di Castri's skill as an orchestrator.

Di Castri's compositions are also performed by the JACK Quartet.

In 2019, Di Castri released a debut album of her compositions in performances by various ensembles and artists.

In 2021, she received a Guggenheim Fellowship.

== Selected works ==
- Anssi de suite… (2015) for solo cello
- AKKORD I (2012) for flute, piano, electronics, and kinetic sculpture installation
- Alba (2011) for orchestra
- The Animal After Whom Other Aninsls Are named (2013) for six singers and electronics
- The Contours of Absence (2018) for string octet (double quartet)
- Cortège (2010) for 13 musicians
- Dear Life (2015) for orchestra, soprano, and recorded narrator
- Dream Feed Origins (2020) for fixed media
- Dream Feed I. - ZD/Olivia (2021) for fixed media, violin, piano
- Dream Feed II. - ZD/Pauchi (2021) for fixed media, violin(s)/voice and processing, and piano
- Dream Feed III. - ZD/Alice (2021) for fixed media, voice/flute and processing, and piano
- Dream Feed IV. - ZD/Chloe (2021) for fixed media, cello and processing, and piano
- Dream Feed V. - ZD/Aiyum (2021) for fixed media, percussion, and piano
- Du haut de l’Orillon (2007, revised 2008) for clarinet and electronics
- DUX (2017) for solo piano
- Escapement (2009) for oboe, saxophone, percussion, piano, and accordion
- Everything Too Big To Take Apart (2012) for tape and interactive wii controller, for dance
- Four Miniatures for Woodwind Quintet (2009, revised 2010) for woodwind quintet
- how many bodies have we to pass through (2017, revised 2019) for solo percussion
- Hunger (2018) for orchestra, improvised drummer, and silent film
- Pentimento (2022) for orchestra, commissioned for thy WDR Symphony Orchestra Cologne
- In the Half-light (2022) for Orchestra, commissioned for the Toronto Symphony Orchestra
- La forma dello spazio (2010) for chamber ensemble
- L’allée d’ardoise (2009) for 12 musicians
- Lineage (2013)
- Listen to Low (2010) for tape
- Long is the Journey, Short is the Memory (2019) for Orchestra & Chorus, commissioned for the [BBC Proms] 2019
- Manif (2013) for percussion quartet
- Near Mute Force (2016) for 2 voices, viola, piano, drum set plus auxiliary percussion
- Pamplecaribou (2013) for amplified flute, piano, cello, and tape
- Patina (2016) for solo violin
- Phonobellow (2015) for 5 instrumentalists, electronics and interactive sound sculpture, co-composed with David Adamcyk
- The Phonograph (2014) for baritone, violin, and cello
- Phonophotographie (2012) for 15 musicians
- Serafiniana (2014) for orchestra, amplified solo violin, amplified harp, and electronics
- Sprung Testament (2018) for piano and violin
- Strange Matter (2011) for 8 musicians
- String Quartet No 1 (2016)
- sulla mappa concava del buio (2010) for string quartet, soprano, and electronics
- Tachitipo (2016) for two pianists, two percussionists, and electronics
- The Thinking Eye (2006) for solo piano
- Wake, Butterfly (2015) for 12 musicians
- Work and Day (2012) for percussion duo
