= David Roth (opera director) =

David Roth (May 9, 1959 – July 19, 2015) was an American opera director and stage director. He was the General Director of the Kentucky Opera from 2006 to 2015.

== Life and career ==
Born in Beloit, Wisconsin, Roth grew up in western Wisconsin on a 600-acre farm. Roth went to grade school in Westby and Viroqua, Wisconsin, and then graduated from Viroqua High School in 1977. He earned degrees in Business Administration and Vocal Performance from the University of Wisconsin–La Crosse. He began his career working for the Minnesota Opera. He worked as a director's assistant for John Copley, Colin Graham, and Francesca Zambello. He went on to stage works for the Baltimore Opera, the Minnesota Opera, and the Opera Theatre of Saint Louis. In 2000 he joined the staff of the Fort Worth Opera where he worked for six years as the director of production and director of finance.

In 2006 Roth left his post in Fort Worth to assume the role of General Director of the Kentucky Opera. He staged several productions for the Kentucky Opera over the next nine years, and also established Kentucky Opera's Composer Workshop Series; a program which enabled composers to develop new works in Louisville. Under his leadership the company staged the world premieres of two operas by composer Daron Hagen: New York Stories and A Woman in Morocco. He remained director of the company until his death in 2015 due to a car crash caused by a heart attack Roth suffered while he was driving in Urbana, Illinois.
