= Marc Monnet =

French composer of contemporary music (born 1947)

Marc Monnet (born 11 March 1947, in Paris) is a French composer of contemporary music, mainly electroacoustic music, who develops the notion of humour in music.

== Selected works ==
- Patatras, for clarinet, bassoon, 2 violas, 2 cellos and 2 double basses (1984)
- Chant, for solo cello (1984)
- Rigaudon, for horn quartet (1985)
- Les Ténèbres de Marc Monnet, for string quartet (1985)
- Siècle pierre tombeau, for ensemble and electronics (1984)
- Close, for string quartet (1993–1994)
- Wa-wa, for four horns and four trombones (1987)
- Fantasia bruta, for viola solo (1982)
- Chants ténus, for old instruments and electronics (1992)
- Babioles, six pieces for alto saxophone and one piece for tenor saxophone or basset horn (1992)
- Chant fêlé, for flute, clarinet, violin, cello, piano and real time transformations (1996)
- Mouvement, imprévus, et..., for orchestra, violin and other thingies (2013)
