= Mark Bowden (composer) =

Welsh composer of classical music

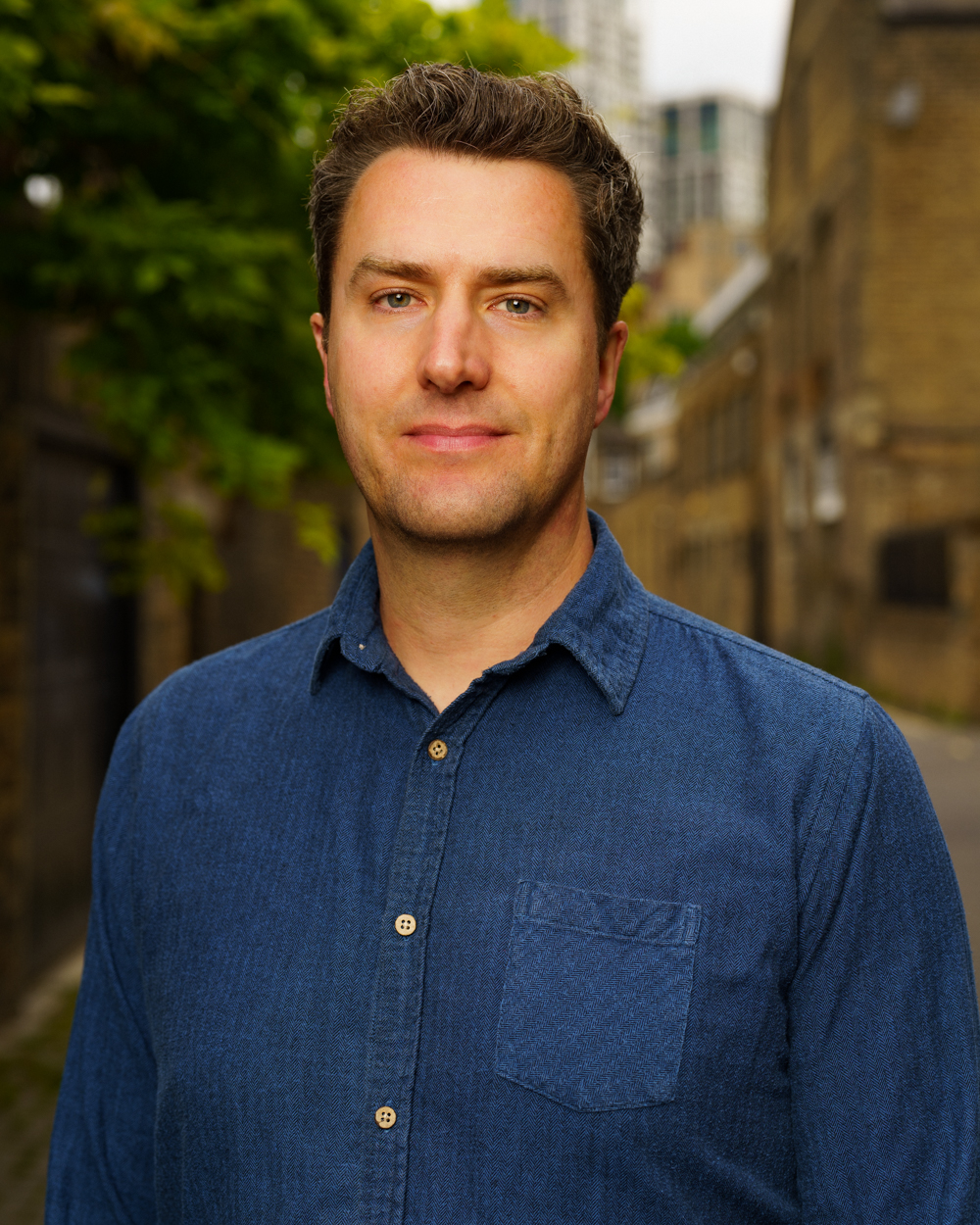
- Mark Bowden in 2022
- Born: 1979 (age 45–46); Wales, UK
- Education: University of Huddersfield; Royal College of Music; Royal Holloway, University of London
- Occupations: Composer; Professor of Music
- Website: markbowden.net

Mark Bowden (born 1979) is a British composer of classical music.

== Biography ==
Bowden studied composition with Richard Steinitz at the University of Huddersfield before completing a master's degree at the Royal College of Music where he studied with Julian Anderson. He has received commissions from the London Sinfonietta, the BBC Symphony Orchestra, the BBC National Orchestra of Wales, the Ulster Orchestra, and Welsh National Opera amongst others and his music has been broadcast by BBC Radio 3. With Anna Meredith and Emily Hall he created the Camberwell Composers' Collective.

Bowden has received awards and prizes for his music including the Royal Philharmonic Society Composition Prize, a British Composer Award, and an Ivor Novello Awards nomination for his saxophone concerto Sapiens.

Bowden was the first composer-in-residence at Handel House Museum and, with fellow composers in the Camberwell Composers' Collective, was New Music Associate at Kettle's Yard in Cambridge from 2008-2010. He was the 2011–2012 Music Fellow at Rambert Dance Company.

Bowden was Resident Composer at BBC National Orchestra of Wales from 2011 to 2015 and Director of Composition at Royal Holloway, University of London from 2007-2022. In 2017 the University of London awarded Bowden the title of Professor of Composition and in 2022 he was appointed Head of Postgraduate Programmes and Professor of Music at the Royal College of Music.
