= Stradivarius (record label) =

Classical record label from Italy

- Founded: 1988
- Founder: Roberto Elli
- Genre: classical, contemporary classical, early music
- Country of origin: Italy
- Location: Cologno Monzese, Milan
- Official website: www.stradivarius.it

Stradivarius Records, Italian Casa Discografica Stradivarius (founded 1988) is a Milan-based independent Italian record label specializing in early music and contemporary classical music. The record label was originally based from a shop in the Via Stradivari, but the shop is now located in the Via Sormani, Cologno Monzese. The label has collaborated with the Milan Conservatory in production of its recordings.

== Times Future ==
The label's Times Future series publishes many modern Italian composers, among them Franco Donatoni, Salvatore Sciarrino, Bruno Maderna, Goffredo Petrassi, Andrea Molino, Ivan Fedele, Slovenian Marij Kogoj, Spanish Luis De Pablo, Americans John Cage and Morton Feldman, and many others.

== Artists ==
=== Composers ===
- John Adams
- Claudio Ambrosini
- Mark Andre
- Georges Aperghis
- Johann Sebastian Bach
- Samuel Barber
- Béla Bartók
- Giorgio Battistelli
- Amy Beach
- Eve Beglarian
- George Benjamin
- Alban Berg
- Luciano Berio
- Pierluigi Billone
- Pierre Boulez
- Sylvano Bussotti
- John Cage
- Nicola Campogrande
- Cristian Carrara
- Elliot Carter
- Benet Casablancas
- Alfredo Casella
- Giulio Castagnoli
- Niccolò Castiglioni
- Luigi Ceccarelli
- Agustí Charles
- Luciano Chessa
- Aldo Clementi
- Azio Corghi
- Henry Cowell
- Armand-Louis Couperin
- George Crumb
- Luigi Dallapiccola
- Franco Donatoni
- Jacob Druckman
- Hugues Dufourt
- Péter Eötvös
- Guido Alberto Fano
- Ferenc Farkas
- Ivan Fedele
- Morton Feldman
- Brian Ferneyhough
- Luc Ferrari
- Luca Francesconi
- Dai Fujikura
- Giorgio Gaslini
- Ada Gentile
- Robert Gerhard
- Stefano Gervasoni
- Philip Glass
- Henryk Górecki
- Sandro Gorli
- Gérard Grisey
- Sofia Gubaidulina
- Cristóbal Halffter
- Lou Harrison
- Jonathan Harvey
- Paul Hindemith
- Arthur Honegger
- Toshio Hosokawa
- André Jolivet
- Marij Kogoj
- Ulrich Krieger
- Gyorgy Kurtag
- Helmut Lachenmann
- Claude Lenners
- Fabien Lévy
- György Ligeti
- Bruno Maderna
- Gian Francesco Malipiero
- Bruno Mantovani
- Giacomo Manzoni
- Philipp Maintz
- Ennio Morricone
- Olga Neuwirth
- Luigi Nono
- Luis de Pablo
- Gérard Pape
- Brice Pauset
- Krzysztof Penderecki
- Goffredo Petrassi
- Gérard Pesson
- Astor Piazzolla
- Matthias Pintscher
- Robert H.P. Platz
- Henri Pousseur
- David del Puerto
- Steve Reich
- Terry Riley
- Fausto Romitelli
- Ney Rosauro
- Doina Rotaru
- Frederic Rzewski
- Carlos Salzedo
- Guido Santórsola
- Giacinto Scelsi
- Alfred Schnittke
- Arnold Schoenberg
- Franz Schubert
- Salvatore Sciarrino
- Stefano Scodanibbio
- Alexander Scriabin
- Roger Sessions
- Dmitri Shostakovich
- Alessandro Solbiati
- Karlheinz Stockhausen
- Marco Stroppa
- Tōru Takemitsu
- Javier Torres Maldonado
- Camillo Togni
- Martino Traversa
- Fabio Vacchi
- Ivan Vandor
- Edgard Varèse
- Gabriel Vicéns
- Anton Webern
- Hans Werner Henze
- Iannis Xenakis
- Bernd Alois Zimmermann

=== Orchestras, ensembles, conductors, and soloists ===
- Simone Alberghini
- Magnus Andersson (guitarist)
- Emanuele Arciuli
- Irvine Arditti
- Enrico Baiano
- Kees Boeke
- Alfred Brendel
- Bruno Canino
- Tito Ceccherini
- Carlo Cecchi
- Sergiu Celibidache
- Michael Chance
- Paolo Cherici
- Aldo Ciccolini
- René Clemencic
- Albert Coates (musician)
- Alan Curtis
- Christian Dierstein
- Gerald Eckert
- Eduardo Egüez
- Gabriel Estarellas
- Roberto Fabbriciani
- Ferenc Fricsay
- Marco Fusi
- Luigi Gaggero
- Mara Galassi
- Pascal Gallois
- Vittorio Ghielmi
- Oscar Ghiglia
- Stanislav Gorkovenko
- Sandro Gorli
- Stefano Grondona
- Roberta Guaspari
- Monica Huggett
- Nicholas Isherwood
- Anja Kampe
- Katalin Károlyi
- Lothar Koenigs
- Magda László
- Francesco Libetta
- Michele Marelli
- Igor Markevitch
- Mario Marzi
- Yehudi Menuhin
- Sara Mingardo
- Roberto Molinelli
- Andrea Molino
- Filomena Moretti
- Ian Pace
- Vittorio Parisi
- George Pehlivanian
- Boris Petrushansky
- Riccardo Piacentini
- Luca Pianca
- Maurizio Pollini
- Enrico Pompili
- Josep Pons
- Rishab Prasanna
- Jean-Guihen Queyras
- Heinz Rehfuss
- Carmela Remigio
- Sviatoslav Richter
- Pascal Rophé
- Heinrich Schiff
- Friedrich Schorr
- Carl Schuricht
- Luisa Sello
- Ruth Siewert
- Mauro Squillante
- John Storgårds
- Ananda Sukarlan
- George Szell
- Flavio Emilio Scogna
- Peter Rundel
- Arturo Tamayo
- Lorraine Vaillancourt
- Mario Venzago
- Ulf Wallin
- Omar Zoboli
- Arditti Quartet
- Léner Quartet
- Penderecki String Quartet
- ensemble recherche
- ICTUS
- Asko/Schönberg
- International Contemporary Ensemble
- Duo Alterno
- Dynamis Ensemble
- Nouvel Ensemble Moderne
- Mainzer Kammerorchester
- Delitiæ Musicæ
- Deutsche Radio Philharmonie Saarbrücken Kaiserslautern
- Community of Madrid Orchestra
- RAI National Symphony Orchestra
- Orchestre National de France
- Orchestre Philharmonique de Radio France
- Orchestra Sinfonica di Milano Giuseppe Verdi
- Vienna Philharmonic
- WDR Symphony Orchestra Cologne
- WDR Rundfunkchor Köln
