= Javier Torres Maldonado =

Mexican composer

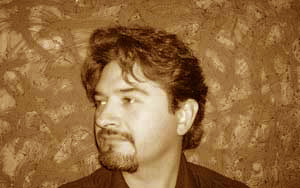
Javier Torres Maldonado, 2005

Javier Torres Maldonado (born 1968) is a Mexican composer internationally recognized for, mostly, his orchestral, chamber, vocal and electro-acoustic works.

== Biography ==
Born in Chetumal (Mexico), José Javier Torres Maldonado studied violin and composition at the Mexico City Conservatory and later, invited by Franco Donatoni, composition at the “G. Verdi” Milan Conservatory, under the supervision of Sandro Gorli and Alessandro Solbiati; he completed his postgraduate studies under Franco Donatoni, Azio Corghi (Accademia Nazionale di Santa Cecilia, Accademia Musicale Chigiana) and Ivan Fedele (Conservatoire de Strasbourg). In 2003, he earned a diploma from the G. Verdi Conservatory for his work in electronic music, and in 2004 he was one of ten composers asked to participate in the Stage de Composition et Informatique Musicale at the Parisian center IRCAM.

In most of his works, Torres Maldonado explores innovative ways of organizing time, timbre and space. For example, in his piece for ensemble and electro-acoustic support, De Ignoto Cantu (2004), the composer presents several melody lines which, despite their complexity, actually derive from a single simple source consisting in a few number of elements; each line contains a considerable degree of horizontal-spectral consonance, but the vertical intervals and the variety of rhythmic accents in each line create a tough dissonance, both in harmony and rhythm, it is: he uses harmonic fields associated to layered pulsation patterns and metric modulation to create a sonic analog to the distorting process of reflection, “almost like a rotating lens through which the view goes in and out of focus”.

About the triptych works Figuralmusik (1996–1998), the composer says: "it originates from the fascination that I have always felt for perceptive illusions, translated into impossible objects in physical reality, and, above all, for the results of the interlacing planes and perspectives used by Piranesi and M. C. Escher". Again contracting, expanding, intersecting and re-elaborating a limited number of fundamental musical figures, he expands the perception of musical objects through rapid or very slow juxtapositions of different temporal fluctuations.

According to Beth E. Levy, at times, Torres Maldonado exploit these complex compositional techniques to propose to the listener an openly social or political message; it is the case of one of his best known pieces, Exabrupto (1998), in which he uses complicated transitions in time and space, sudden breaks in the form and polymeters in a tribute to the memory of Mexican Indians who were assassinated in 1998 in Acteal, Chiapas.

Torres Maldonado has received an international array of honors including the Commande d'Etat by the French Ministry of Culture (2007), the international composition prize of the GRAME (Centre National de Création Musicale) of Lyon (2006), the “Reine Elisabeth” of Brussels (2004), “Alfredo Casella” of Siena (2002), “Reine Maria Jose" of Geneva (2000), “Ad Referendum II” of Montreal (1998), "Città di Barletta" (Italy), the “Prix des Musiciens” (1998) by the Nouvel Ensemble Moderne, the Medalla Mozart from the Austrian and Mexican governments, and he also won the second prize in two successive “Mozart” Competitions in Salzburg (1999 and 2001).

His works have been commissioned and programmed by internationally renowned festivals and institutions around the world, among which: the Mozart Week (Salzburg), Biennale of Venice, Festival Musica (Strasbourg), Biennale Musiques en Scène (Lyon), Settimana Musicale Senese, Gaudeamus Music Week (Amsterdam), Milano Musica Festival, Lucerne Festival, Focus! Festival (New York), Akiyoshidai Music Festival (Japan), Nuova Consonanza (Rome), Festival Days of Contemporary Music (Dresden), Rencontres entre Compositeurs et Interprètes (Paris), Tiroler Festspiele Erl (Austria), CDMC of Madrid, Festivals of Sueca and Alicante (Spain), Festival Internacional Cervantino (Mexico).

His compositions are performed, among others, by Armand Angster, Mario Caroli, Carlo Chiarappa, Pascal Contet, Pablo Marquez, Arditti Quartet, Ensemble Aleph, Nouvel Ensemble Moderne, Ensemble Orchestral Contemporain, San Francisco Contemporary Music Players, Divertimento Ensemble, Ensemble Risognanze, National Orchestra of Belgium, La Fenice Opera Theater Symphony Orchestra of Venice, Symphony Orchestra of Bilbao, Haydn Orchestra of Bolzano, Orchestra Regionale Toscana. As conductor and artistic director of the Dynamis Ensemble he had programmed and premiered most contemporary music works of young composers in different festivals in both sides of the Atlantic.

Resident in Italy from 1996, From 2003 to 2007 he became professor in electro-acoustic composition, composition assisted by computer and composition techniques on the 20th century at the Conservatoire “A. Vivaldi” of Alessandria, Italy, and from 2007 he teaches electro-acoustic composition and electronic music at the Conservatoire "G. Verdi" of Milan. He has taught composition, composition assisted by computer, sound modelling lecturing at Trento-Riva del Garda and Monopoli Conservatoires (Italy), the Conservatoires of Lugano and Lausanne (Switzerland), and in Mexico and Spain.

== Awards ==
- 2011, Composer in residence, GRAME (Centre National de Création Musicale), Lyon, France. Composition project: ATLACUALO, THE CEASING OF WATER, acousmatic music for a multidisciplinary work (theater/dance). Commission by the Navarrete x Kajiyama Dancetheater Company of San Francisco (U. S. A.)
- 2011, Composer in residence, Centre National de Création Musicale “La Muse en circuit", Alfortville, France. Composition project: UN POSIBLE DIA (quasi un radio dramma), for voice, one actor, ensemble, interactive electroacoustic system and video. First world performance: 20.05.2010, Festival Extension, Villejuif, France.
- 2010, Composer in residence, GRAME (Centre National de Création Musicale), Lyon, France. Project of composition: IRIDISCENTE (2010–2011), for percussions, piano, electro-acoustic interactive system and video. First world performance: 12.05.2011, Opéra National de Lyon, Festival Journées de GRAME.
- 2009-2012. CONACULTA / FONCA (National Council for the Arts and Culture of Mexico), honorary member of the Sistema Nacional de Creadores de Arte, Mexico.
- 2008-2012, Commande de l'Etat, commission from the French Ministry of Culture for hus work Sinfonia Mixta, for three instrumental groups and electroacoustic support.
- 2007-2010: Commande d'État, Commission from the French Ministry of Culture for a work for voice and ensemble to the Soprano François Kubler and the Ensemble Accroche Note of Strasbourg.
- 2006: 6th. International Composition Competition GRAME (Centre National de Création Musicale), Lyon, France. Work commissioned by the GRAME, the Ensemble Orchestral Contemporain and the Biennale Musiques en Scène of Lyon: "Sinfonia Mixta", for ensemble and electro-acoustic support. Jury: Henry Forés, Pierre-Alain Jaffrenou, Daniel Kawka, Didier Muhleisen, Francois Paris, Beatrice Rameau and Lorraine Vaillancourt.
- 2004: First Prize, International Composition Competition Queen Elisabeth of Bruxelles. Winning work: Obscuro entiantum lumine, for violin and 3 orchestral groups. Jury: Luis de Pablo, Kajia Saariaho, Michael Jarrell, Tristan Murail, Luca Francesconi, Ivan Fedele, Arie van Lysebeth, Stefan Niculescu, Frederik van Rossum, N. Bolens.
- 2004: FONCA (Fund for Culture) and SRE (Mexican Ministry of Foreign Affairs). Sponsorship granted for the recording of the CD Exabrupto.
- 2003-2006. CONACULTA (National Council for the Arts and Culture of Mexico). Honorary member of the Sistema Nacional de Creadores de Arte, Mexico..
- 2001: First Prize, X International Composition Competition “Alfredo Casella” of Siena. Winning work: Como el viento, for orchestra. Jury: Azio Corghi, Ivan Vador, Michele Dall’Ongaro.
- 2000: First Prize, International Composition Competition Queen Maria Jose of Geneva. Winning work: Luz, for accordion and string quartet. Jury: Marius Constant, Pascal Contet, Gabor Takacs-Nagy, Jean Balissat, Philippe Dinkel, Éric Gaudibert.
- 1999: First Prize: International Composition Competition Ad Referendum II of the SMCQ, Montréal. Winning work: Figuralmusik II, for 10 players. Prize assigned by the public audience.
- 1999: The Mozart Medal from the governments of Mexico and Austria.
- 1998: Prix des Musiciens, Nouvel Ensemble Moderne, Forum of Montréal.
- 1997: First Prize, International Composition Competition "Città di Barletta", Italy. Winning work: Ximohua, for voice and wind quintet.
- For two times (2000 and 2003): Second Prize at the International Composition Competition Mozart of Salzburg.
- 2006, VI Tribuna Mexicana de la Música, electro-acoustic music with instruments category. Work selected to represent Mexico during the Tribune International des compositeurs UNESCO in Paris: Tiento, for cello and electronics.
- 2004: one of 10 young composers in residence during the III Forum International des Jeunes Compositeurs of the Ensemble Aleph.
- 2004: one of 10 composers in residence during the 1ères. Rencontres entre Compositeurs et Interprètes de Paris. Syntono, Cité Culture, Cité Internationale Universitaire of Paris.
- 2003: honorific mention, International Composition Competition "Settimane Musicali di Stresa" for his work Currentes II, for orchestra.
- 1999: honorific mention for his work "Uris", for 16 voices, International Composition Competition “Guido d’Arezzo“.

== Discography ==
- Amberola Records (AMBC CD 7141 33719) Exabrupto, for 3 instrumental groups, 1 pianist and 1 percussionist. Nouvel Ensemble Moderne, cond. by Lorraine Vaillancourt.
- Stradivarius (STR 33719) Exabrupto, for 3 instrumental groups, 1 pianist and 1 percussionist. Nouvel Ensemble Moderne, cond. by Lorraine Vaillancourt.
- Stradivarius (STR 33719) Tiento, for violoncello and electronics version. Andrea Cavuoto, violoncello.
- Stradivarius (STR 33719) The unexpected clock in the mirrors, for violin, bass-clarinet and ensemble. Carlo Chiarappa, violin, Armand Angster, bass-clarinet, Dynamis Ensemble, cond. Javier Torres Maldonado.
- Stradivarius (STR 33719) Orior, for piano solo. Candida Felici, piano.
- Stradivarius (STR 33719) De ignoto cantu, for bass-clarinet, trumpet, percussion, violin, violoncello and electronics. Dynamis Ensemble, cond. Javier Torres Maldonado.
- Stradivarius (STR 33719) Luz, for accordion and string quartet. Germano Scurti, accordion, Terpsycordes String Quartet.
- Ambroisie (AMB 9987) Obscuro etiantum lumine, for violin and three orchestral groups. Mikhail Ovrutsky, violin, National Symphony Orchestra of Belgium, cond. Giles Varga.

== Published works ==
Solos

- Alborada (2004), for soprano sax. (40"). Edizioni Suvini Zerboni of Milan, S. 12450 Z., published in 2004.
- Desde el instante (2002), three pieces for clarinet (6/7'). Edizioni Suvini Zerboni of Milan, S. 12089 Z., published in 2004.
- Invención (2002), for solo violin (40" ca.). Edizioni Suvini Zerboni of Milan, S. 12076 Z., published in 2002.
- Lacrymosa I (2001), for accordion or any keyboard-aerophone instrument (4'). Edizioni Suvini Zerboni of Milan, S. 11936 Z., published in 2001.
- Orior (1997) for forte piano solo (or harpsichord solo, or piano solo) (7'). Universal Edition, Viena, UE31247, published in 1998.
- Primer libro del canto alado (2006) for piccolo, flute, flute in G and bass flute -1 player- (6' ca.). Edizioni Suvini Zerboni of Milan, S. 12855 Z., published in 2006.
- Tiento (2000) for solo cello (6/7'). Edizioni Suvini Zerboni of Milan, S. 11734 Z., published in 2000.
- Tres estudios para violín (2001) (9 -10'). Universal Edition, Viena, UE31904, published in 2001.

Instruments and electronics

- Alborada (2004) version for soprano sax. and CD (40"). Edizioni Suvini Zerboni of Milan, S. 12450 Z., published in 2004.
- Hacia el umbral del aire (2005), for accordion and digital electro-acoustic support -4 chnls or stereo version.-, (7'). Edizioni Suvini Zerboni of Milan, S. 12710 Z., published in 2005.
- Huayra Yana (2003, new version: 2013) for bass-flute and digital electro-acoustic support -4 chnls. or stereo version.-. (10'). Edizioni Suvini Zerboni of Milan, S. 12246 Z., published in 2003, new version: 2013.
- Iridiscente (2010-2011), for piano, percussions (1 player), electro-acoustic interactive system and video (ad libitum.) (10')

Work commissioned by GRAME (Centre National de Création Musical, Lyon, France) and the Sistema Nacional de Creadores de Arte/FONCA, Mexico.

- Tiento (2004), violoncello and electronic sounds -CD- version (7' ca.)

Chamber music

- Ad imitationem moduli (2004), for violin, viola and violoncello (4'). Edizioni Suvini Zerboni of Milan, S. 12396 Z., published in 2004.
- De ignoto cantu (2003), -version for 3 players- for bass cl., perc., vc. and electronic sounds (CD) ad libitum (8’) -see also electro-acoustic music with instruments-. Edizioni Suvini Zerboni of Milan, S. 12325 Z., published in 2003.
- Espira I, Espira II (2005) for guitar, piano, violin and violoncello (8' ca.). Edizioni Suvini Zerboni of Milan, S. 12325 Z., published in 2005.
- Imágenes de la caída de Altazor (2003) for 2 pianos and 2 perc. (14'). Edizioni Suvini Zerboni of Milan, S. 12159 Z., published in 2005.
- Interstizi (2003) for violin and violoncello (11'). Edizioni Suvini Zerboni of Milan, S. 12205 Z., published in 2003.
- Luz (2000), for accordion and string quartet (16/17') Edizioni Suvini Zerboni of Milan, S. 11778 Z., published in 2001.
- Montuno y canto (2006), for 2 violins (1'). Edizioni Suvini Zerboni of Milan, S. 12856 Z., published in 2006.
- Quinteto (1994), for flute, oboe, clar., bssn., hr. (5') Edizioni Suvini Zerboni of Milan, S. 11726 Z., published in 2000.
- Reflejo espiral (2000), for flute and percussion. (3') Edizioni Suvini Zerboni of Milan, S. 11735 Z., published in 2000.
- Segundo libro del canto alado (2006), for clarinet and string quartet. (9') Edizioni Suvini Zerboni of Milan, S. 12872 Z., published in 2006.
- Sones (2001), for violin, cello and piano. (9') Edizioni Suvini Zerboni of Milan, S. 11858 Z., published in 2006.

Ensemble

- Claroscuros (2001), for two clarinetists, bass-trombone, cello and double-bass (12'). Edizioni Suvini Zerboni of Milan, S. 11934 Z., published in 2001.
- De Ignoto Cantu (2004), 2nd. version for bass-clarinet, trumpet, percussion, violin, cello and electronics ad libitum, (8'). Suvini Zerboni of Milan, S. 12419 Z., published in 2005.
- Ecos (2002), for two groups wind instruments (8'). Edizioni Suvini Zerboni of Milan, S. 12043 Z., published in 2002.
- El suspiro del Ángel (2006), for 3 instrumental groups and electro-acoustic support -4 channels-. (10'30"). Edizioni Suvini Zerboni of Milan, S. 12869 Z., published in 2006.
- Exabrupto (1997/98), for 3 instrumental groups, piano and perc. (16/17'). Edizioni Suvini Zerboni of Milan, S. 12869 Z., published in 2006.
- Figuralmusik I (1996) for flute, clarinet, violin, violoncello and piano (8'). Edizioni Suvini Zerboni of Milan, S. 11728 Z., published in 2000.
- Figuralmusik II (1996) for 10 players (8’). Edizioni Suvini Zerboni of Milan, S. 11730 Z., published in 2000.
- Figuralmusik II/a (2003), for ten players and electronics -CD-, (8'). Edizioni Suvini Zerboni of Milan, S. 12185 Z., published in 2004.
- Hemisferios artificiales (2002) for flute, clarinet, 1 perc., piano, violin and violoncello (8'). Edizioni Suvini Zerboni of Milan, S. 12049 Z., published in 2002.
- Sinfonia Mixta (2006–2008) for 3 instrumental groups (15 instruments) and electro-acoustic support (21'). Edizioni Suvini Zerboni of Milan, S. 13140 Z., published in 2008.

Soloists and ensemble

- The unexpected clock in the mirrors, for violin, bass-clarinet and ensemble (12'). Edizioni Nuova Stradivarius of Milan, published in 2005.

Orchestra

- Como el viento (2002), for orchestra (15'). Edizioni Suvini Zerboni of Milan, S. 12272 Z., published in 2002.
- Currentes (2003), for orchestra (10'). Edizioni Suvini Zerboni of Milan, S. 12161 Z., published in 2003.
- Esferal (2006), for orchestra and CD (11'). Edizioni Suvini Zerboni of Milan, S. 12161 Z., published in 2006.
- Silueta (2001), for orchestra (6'). Edizioni Suvini Zerboni of Milan, S. 11888 Z., published in 2001.
- Tres invenciones "Haydn" (2005), for orchestra (10'). Edizioni Suvini Zerboni of Milan, S. 12554 Z., published in 2005.

Soloists and orchestra

- Figuralmusik III (1998), for flute, oboe, clar. and string orchestra (8-9') Edizioni Suvini Zerboni of Milan, S. 11732 Z., published in 2000.
- Obscuro etiantum lumine (2004) for violin and 3 orchestral groups (12'). Edizioni Suvini Zerboni of Milan, S. 12685 Z., published in 2000.

Vocal music

- Uris (1999) for mixed choir -16 voices- on texts of Rumi, Cino da Pistoia, and Thibau de Navarre (6'30"). Edizioni Suvini Zerboni of Milan, S. 12049 Z., published in 2000.

Vocal music with instruments

- ...en el aire... (2002) for soprano and 5 players, texts by Octavio Paz and E. Torres Maldonado (8'). Edizioni Suvini Zerboni of Milan, S. 12077 Z., published in 2002.
- Ximohua (1997) for voice and wind quintet on texts of Nezahualcoyotl (9/10'). Edizioni Suvini Zerboni of Milan, S. 11740 Z., published in 2000.

Electro-acoustic

- Aurae (2002) Electroacoustic composition -CD- (7'53"). Edizioni Suvini Zerboni of Milan, S. 12453 Z., published in 2004.
- Fontane (2002) Electroacoustic composition -CD stereo version- (5'42"). Edizioni Suvini Zerboni of Milan, S. 12454 Z., published in 2004.
- Ventus animae Electroacoustic composition -CD- (1'37"). Edizioni Suvini Zerboni of Milan, S. 13121 Z., published in 2007.

Video (collaborations)

- Fontane (2004) Video by Elisa Franzoi and Sara Maino based on the electroacoustic composition of Javier Torres Maldonado "Fontane" (5'42"). Italy, 2005.
