= Turin Philharmonic Orchestra =

- Orchestra
- Native name: Orchestra Filarmonica di Torino
- Founded: 1992
- Location: Turin, Italy
- Concert hall: Conservatorio Giuseppe Verdi
- Principal conductor: Giampaolo Pretto
- Website: www.oft.it/it/

The Turin Philharmonic Orchestra (Orchestra Filarmonica di Torino; OFT) is an Italian orchestra based in Turin. It was established in April 1992, following a decade of activity under the name Filarmonici di Torino, during which it co-produced symphonic seasons with the RAI National Symphony Orchestra and the Fondazione Compagnia di San Paolo from 1991 to 1994.

The orchestra has performed in Italy, France, Switzerland, Spain, Belgium, and the Far East. It has been a regular participant in the MITO Settembre Musica festival, presenting symphonic and chamber concerts in Turin and Milan. The orchestra's repertoire spans from the Baroque to the 20th century, featuring both masterpieces and rarely performed works.

== History ==
The orchestra was founded as a non-profit association to produce classical music concerts in Turin. It receives support from the Italian Ministry of Culture, the Piedmont Region, the City of Turin, and the Fondazione Compagnia di San Paolo, which funds initiatives for young artists. Since 1993, it has presented its own symphonic season at the Conservatorio Giuseppe Verdi in Turin, with programming structured around specific themes to create unique events. The ensemble draws on professional musicians and young talents, with a variable roster depending on the production.

The orchestra's activities have included collaborations with renowned conductors such as Aldo Ceccato, Sergiu Celibidache, Carlo Maria Giulini, James Levine, and Giuseppe Patanè, as well as soloists including Boris Belkin, Andrea Bocelli, and Maurice Bourgue. It has worked with conductors including Alessandro Cadario, Federico Maria Sardelli, Zahia Ziouani, Tito Ceccherini, Alexander Mayer, Daniele Rustioni, Filippo Maria Bressan, Benjamin Bayl, Nathan Brock, and Marco Angius, and soloists such as Nikolaj Znaider, Marco Rizzi, Massimo Quarta, Simonide Braconi, Enrico Dindo, Maurizio Baglini, David Greilsammer, Francesca Dego, Benedetto Lupo, and Mario Brunello. It has also promoted international talents such as Gilad Harel, Suyoen Kim, Alexander Chaushian, Martina Filjak, Philippe Graffin, Vincent Beer-Demander, and Ronald Brautigam, and Italian artists including Emanuele Arciuli, Andrea Rebaudengo, Giuseppe Albanese, Francesca Leonardi, Ivano Battiston, and Ula Ulijona Zebriunaite.

The orchestra has performed in Italy, France, Switzerland, Spain, Belgium, and the Far East. It has been a regular participant in the MITO Settembre Musica festival, presenting symphonic and chamber concerts in Turin and Milan. In 2024 and 2025, it performed at the New Year's Concert in Piazza Castello, Turin, attended by 10,000 people and broadcast on Sky's Classica HD and Rete 4. It also participated in Turin's Summer Festivals in public squares alongside the RAI National Symphony Orchestra and Teatro Regio orchestra.

== Repertoire and programming ==
The orchestra's repertoire spans from the Baroque to the 20th century, featuring both masterpieces and rarely performed works. It emphasizes historically informed performance practices, particularly for chamber-sized ensembles.The orchestra commissions new compositions and balances familiar repertoire with contemporary music. For the 2024–2025 season, titled One Way Together, it scheduled eight concerts from October 2024 to June 2025, primarily at the Conservatorio Giuseppe Verdi, with open rehearsals at Teatro Vittoria and Via Baltea 3. The season concluded on 3 June 2025 with a Beethoven program including the Creatures of Prometheus overture and Symphony No. 7.

The orchestra has premiered works such as Egyptian Scenes by Egyptian composer Ahmed El-Saedi in 2024. It also maintains educational initiatives, including school outreach, youth engagement projects like OFT Lab (launched in 2022), and listening guides at the Circolo dei Lettori. Typically, the orchestra presents nine concerts per season from October to June, held on Tuesdays at 9 p.m. at the Conservatorio Giuseppe Verdi, often preceded by public rehearsals on Sundays at 5 p.m.

== Recordings ==
The orchestra's recordings are released by labels including Naxos, Decca, Claves, Victor, RS, and Stradivarius, focusing on symphonic music with some operatic works. Its own label, OFT LIVE, is distributed via iTunes Store. Notable releases include arrangements of Johann Strauss II waltzes and polkas for chamber orchestra, commissioned by the orchestra since 1999.

== Leadership ==
Since 2016, the artistic direction has been led by a team comprising Michele Mo (president and artistic director), Giampaolo Pretto (musical director), and Gabriele Montanaro (general secretary). Pretto, who handles the most demanding musical challenges, previously served as principal guest conductor. From 2006 to 2016, Nicola Campogrande was artistic director.Sergio Lamberto serves as first violin and concertmaster for the orchestra's string ensemble, Gli Archi dell'Orchestra Filarmonica di Torino.
