= Goldoni (disambiguation) =

Carlo Goldoni was an Italian playwright and librettist from the Republic of Venice.

Goldoni may also refer to:

- Goldoni (company), tractor manufacturer
- Goldoni (surname), Italian surname

== See also ==
- Goldon
- Signor Goldoni
- Teatro Carlo Goldoni (disambiguation)
