= Giulio Castagnoli =

Italian composer

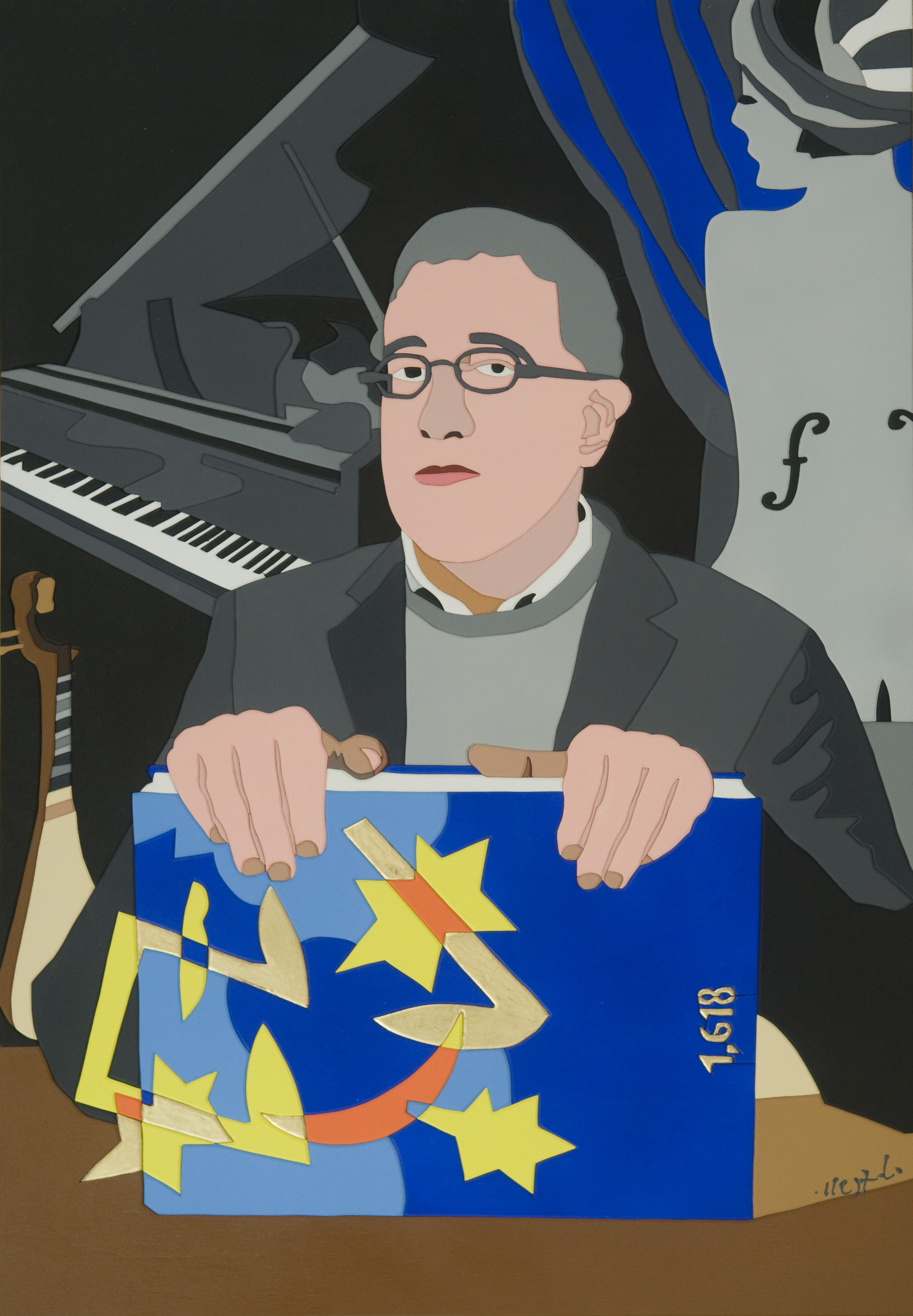
Giulio come Casella come Casorati by Ugo Nespolo (2016)

Giulio Castagnoli (born 22 November 1958) is an Italian composer.

== Life and career ==
Giulio Castagnoli was born 22 November 1958 in Rome. Castagnoli, great-grandson of the Florentine composer and pianist Edgardo Del Valle de Paz, graduated in literature (Turin University), piano and composition (Turin Conservatory) before postgraduate degrees in composition at the Hochschule für Musik Freiburg with Brian Ferneyhough (1986), and at Accademia Nazionale di Santa Cecilia in Rome with Franco Donatoni (1987). He is currently professor of composition at the Turin Conservatory.

Castagnoli collaborates with RAI-Radiotelevisione Italiana as a musicologist in programs on contemporary music, leads a concert series in Turin, and is the editor of the musical review "Quaderni di Musica Nuova". He won several international composition contexts. His one act radio opera "To the Museum" (libretto by Ugo Nespolo) got a special mention of the Jury at 1991 Prix Italia. He was selected in many other events, like the World Music Days of the ISCM in Hong Kong in 1988. Luciano Berio conducted his music. Castagnoli has also received commissions from Radio France, RAI-Italian Radio, the City of Geneva, Stamford Chamber Orchestra (United States), Radio Suisse Romande, and from festivals, soloists and ensembles including the Elision Ensemble, Melbourne, Nieuw Ensemble, Amsterdam, Divertimento Ensemble, Milan, Xenia Ensemble, Turin. Castagnoli was invited by DAAD – Senate of Berlin as composer in residence 1998–99 and in summer 2003. As a musicologist, he obtained scholarship from the Paul Sacher Foundation, Basel in 1999. Luciano Berio commissioned from him his Concerto per Violoncello e Doppia Orchestra, for Santa Cecilia 2002 which had a 3 concert season in Rome.

== List of works ==
1. "Qui conta come Narcis" ... per pianoforte e voce recitante ad libitum (1982) ( 6') (Ricordi). Tortona, Teatro Municipale, 18 febbraio 1983, Livia Conte
2. "Quasi una fantasia" (sopra un finale) (1983) (8') per pianoforte solo (Ricordi). Turin, 17 marzo 1984, Conservatorio, Francesco Cipolletta
3. "Le ore e le lune" opera da camera on a libretto by Sergio Liberovici, for soprano, flute (or ottavino), clarinet (or clarinet bass), guitar (or mandolin), violoncello (1984). Turin, 3 maggio 1984, Salone Ippolito Nievo, Luisa Castellani, voce, Mara Armanni, violoncello, Sergio Delmastro, clarinetto, Davide Ficco, chitarra, Claudio Montafia, flauto
4. "Ricercare sopra un tema di Francesco Geminiani" per oboe e clavicembalo (1984) (6') Saint Vincent, Sala dei Congressi, 26 aprile 1985, Silvano Scanziani, oboe, Maria Grazia Bertocchi, clavicembalo
5. "Serenata après l'11.ème étude de Villalobos" per chitarra (1984) (6') (Edipan)(disco PAN3009 e disco Oliphant CNTP 00991. Freiburg, Musikhochschule, 8 gennaio 1986, Jürgen Ruck
6. "Partita " per contrabbasso (1984, rev.1993) (4')
7. "Uqbar", trio d'archi per 7 sopra una canzone famosa per ottavino, clarinetto basso, percussioni, pianoforte, violino, viola e violoncello (1984) (15') (Edizioni Suvini Zerboni)(Disco Happy New Ears-Compositori Associati, Ca 912) Graz, Steirisches Herbst, Musikprotokoll, 24 ottobre 1986, Pro Arte Ensemble Graz, direttore Adolf Hennig
8. "Quartetto per archi" (note ad A Bao A Qu) (13') (1985) Milan, 1 ottobre 1985, Auditorium di Porta Vigentina, Quartetto Arditti
9. "Finzione" per ottavino, oboe, clarinetto basso, clavicembalo, percussioni, violino, viola e violoncello (8')(1985) Rome, 21 giugno 1985, Villa Medici, Gruppo Musica d’Oggi, direttore Gino Lanzillotta
10. "Limber Jack" per sassofoni soprano, tenore e baritono (5' opp.10', opp.15 ')(1985) Ferrara, Aterforum, 5 giugno 1985, Alfredo Ponissi, sassofoni
11. ""L'inutil precauzione"" (aria del cembalo), per ottavino, sassofono tenore, tromba e clavicembalo ( 7')(1985) – Turin, Settembre Musica, Teatro Nuovo, 19 settembre 1985 Maria Luisa Pacciani, clavicembalo, Renato Cugno, tromba, Claudio Montafia, ottavino, Alfredo Ponissi, sassofono
12. "Finzione II" – concerto per violoncello e orchestra (14') (1985) (piccola orchestra) Freiburg, 10 luglio 1986, Carola Drexler, violoncello
13. "Klang per archi", omaggio a Giacinto Scelsi (7')(1986) (Casa Musicale Sonzogno)(Disco Happy New Ears- Compositori Associati CA912) Maiano, 4 ottobre 1986, Haydn Philarmonia, direttore Ezio Rojatti
14. "Trio per violino", violoncello e pianoforte (9') (1986) (Edizioni Suvini Zerboni)(Disco Happy New Ears-Compositori Associati, CA 912) Rome, Auditorium del Foro Italico, 31 ottobre 1986, Mario Buffa violino, Luigi Lanzillotta violoncello, Giancarlo Simonacci, pianoforte
15. "Duo per violino solo" (8') (1986) (Edizioni Suvini Zerboni). Amsterdam, Concertgebouw, 18 aprile 1987, Cécile Huijnen, violino
16. "Trio II" per flauto, clarinetto basso e arpa (10) (1986) (Edizioni Suvini Zerboni) ( Disco Happy New Ears- Compositori Associati, CA 912). Amsterdam, 12 novembre 1987, Gaudeamus Music Week, Waalse Kerk, Harry Sparnaay, clarinetto basso, Harrie Staareveld, Flauto, Masumi Nagasawa, arpa Altra versione: Trio II b per flauto, clarinetto basso e pianoforte (1986/87) (10') (Edizioni Suvini Zerboni)(Disco Happy New Ears – Compositori Associati, CA911) Amsterdam, De Ijsbrecker, 18 marzo 1988, Het Trio: Harry Sparnaay, clarinetto Basso, Harrie Starreveld, flauto, René Eckhardt, pianoforte
17. "Trio per quattro" per flauto, clarinetto basso, chitarra e pianoforte (altra versione di Trio II) (10')(1986/87)(Edizioni Suvini Zerboni) (Disco ADDA 590014 AD 184) Buenos Aires, Teatro Colon, 10 agosto 1987, Antidogma Musica, direttore Enrico Correggia
18. "Secondo quartetto con voci" per quartetto d'archi, soprano, attrice e nastro magnetico (14') (1987) (Edizioni Suvini Zerboni) (Disco Happy New Ears – Compositori Associati, CA 912) RaiRadiotre, 8 giugno 1987
19. "Bestiario", otto studi per trio di fiati per flauto, clarinetto e fagotto (15') (1987) (Edizioni del "Premio Valentino Bucchi", Rome) – Turin, Settembre Musica, 20 settembre 1987, Marco Bruno, flauto, Walter Frezzato, clarinetto, Rodolfo Passuello, fagotto
20. "Numeri", concerto per orchestra (20') (1987) per grande orchestra 31 maggio 1993 Bucarest, Sala della Radio, Festival di Musica Contemporanea, Orchestra della Radio di Stato Rumena, direttore Gheorghe Costin
21. "Doppio Quintetto" per flauto (anche ottavino e flauto in sol), (anche clarinetto piccolo e basso), corno, chitarra, pianoforte, e quintetto d'archi (13') (1988) (Edizioni Stradivarius) (Disco Stradivarius, STR 33572). Parigi, Grande Salle Centre Pompidou, 17 marzo 1988, Antidogma Musica, direttore Enrico Correggia
22. "Due stanze giapponesi" per trombone solo (7') (1988) (Ricordi) (Disco RCA CCD 3003) Versione 1992 "Tre stanze giapponesi": Al sole; In un tempio; All'ombra, per trombone solo (Ricordi) Turin, 8 maggio 1993 Goethe – Institut Turin, Roberto Zucca
23. "Doppio Trio" per flauto, clarinetto basso, arpa, violino, violoncello e pianoforte (8')(1988) (Edizioni Suvini Zerboni). Cremona, Spazionovecento, 12 novembre 1988, Gruppo Musica Insieme, direttore Pietro Antonini
24. "Black out" per sax baritono e pianoforte (altra versione per clarinetto basso e pianoforte) (7') (1988). Rome, S. Margherita in Trastevere, Federico Mondelci, sassofono, Oscar Pizzo, pianoforte
25. "Quartetto per clarinetto", violino, violoncello e pianoforte (13') (1989) (Quaderni Perugini di Musica Contemporanea). Perugia, 12 maggio 1989, Aula Magna Università per Stranieri, Gabriele Mirabassi, clarinetto, Gabriele Raspanti, violino, Ulrike Brand, violoncello, Meret Kammer, pianoforte
26. "Sei Haiku" per nove strumenti e soprano (flauto, clarinetto — anche clarinetto basso, percussioni, mandolino, chitarra, arpa, violino, viola e contrabbasso) (eseguibili anche in due cicli di tre pezzi ciascuno) (28') (1989) (Ricordi) (Disco RCA CCD 3011) Commissioned by Elision Ensemble-Melbourne. 15 luglio 1990 Melbourne, Melba Hall-University of Melbourne, ELISION Ensemble, direttore Sandro Gorli
27. "Monk & sphere" per clarinetto basso solo (6') (1990) (Ricordi) (Disco DDT 19203) Turin, Festival Antidogma, 30 settembre 1991, Rocco Parisi
28. "Cinque Madrigali" per undici archi (6 violini, 2 viole, 2 violoncelli e 1 contrabbasso) ( 15') (1990) Commande de la Ville de Gèneve. Gèneve, Hotel de Ville, 9 luglio 1990 Antidogma Ensemble, direttore Andrea Molino Nuova versione: 23/11/1992 Bologna, Teatro Comunale, Accademia Bizantina, direttore Luciano Berio
29. "Tre Tanka" dallo "Hiakunin Isshu" per flauto e pianoforte (10') (1990) (EDIPAN) (disco PAN 3039). 10 maggio 1991 Rome, Villa Medici, Manuel Zurria, flauto, Oscar Pizzo, pianoforte
30. "Quattro Notturni" per quartetto d'archi (terzo quartetto), da "in forma di Haiku" di Carlo Cignetti (13') (1990) (Ricordi). Turin, Tempio Valdese, 9 maggio 1991, Quartetto d’archi di Torino
31. "Al Museo in volo & a zompi" opera buffa radiofonica in un atto e dodici quadri per soprano leggero, mezzosoprano, bass barytone, voci recitanti, coro, orchestra e nastro magnetico opera commissionata da Radiotre per il Prix Italia 1991) (45') (1991) (Edizioni Nuova Fonit Cetra, Disco Fonit Cetra CTD16)
32. "Miles" per clarinetto basso e violoncello (6') (1991) (Ricordi). Rome, 23 gennaio 1992, Ciro Scarponi, clarinetto basso, Gino Lanzillotta, violoncello
33. "Cloches en noir et blanc" per flauto, clarinetto, corno, percussioni, sintetizzatore, pianoforte, violino e violoncello (1991) (14') (Edizioni Stradivarius) (Disco Stradivarius, STR 33572) 24 gennaio 1992 Paris, Présences 92, Maison de la Radio, Ensemble TM+, direttore Laurent Cuniot
34. "Canti per orchestra" (14') (1991) (Edizioni Ricordi) Commission of the Stamford Chamber Orchestra. 20 giugno 1992 Stamford Con. (U.S.A.), Stamford Chamber Orchestra, direttore Laurence Gilgore
35. "A due voci" per soprano, quintetto di fiati e pianoforte (11') da "Ottava Fuga" di Umberto Saba(1992) (Ricordi). Cosenza, Aula Magna dell’Università della Calabria, Barbara Lazotti, soprano; Gruppo Musica d'Oggi, direttore Gino Lanzillotta
36. "Tre musiche a china" per flauto (in do e in sol), clarinetto basso, percussioni e pianoforte (10') (1992) (Ricordi). 7 ottobre 1994 Paris, IRCAM, Elementi dell’Orchestra Sinfonica Emilia-Romagna, direttore Bruno Garbarino
37. "Al Maestro" per ensemble (1992) (2’) (Ricordi) 13/3/1993 Bruxelles, Festival Ars Musica, Nieuw Ensemble di Amsterdam, direttore Ed Spanijard
38. "Una lettera a china" per violoncello e pianoforte (1992) (2’) (Ricordi)
39. "Cloches blanches et noires" per grande orchestra (1992/93) (16')
40. " Oltre lo stretto vuoto" per pianoforte ed amplificazione (1992/93)( 8') (Ricordi) (Disco RCA 74321-16229-2). 5 ottobre 1993 Havana, Festival di Musica Contemporanea, Oscar Pizzo
41. "Vana – Evanescente – Invano", tre pezzi per orchestra (1993) (12') (Ricordi) 18/2/1993 Sanremo, Orchestra Filarmonica di San Remo, direttore Daniele Agiman
42. "Quattro canti di Omar Khayyam", per sestetto d'archi (1993) (18') 29 settembre 1993 Turin, Festival Antidogma Musica, Auditorium Rai, Sextuor à cordes de L'A.I.E.C. – Lille
43. "Tre liriche d'Oriente", per flauto dolce basso e basso di viola (1993) (15') versione 1998 per violoncello e flauto in sol 22 febbraio 1994 Lausanne, Maison de la Radio, Kees Boeke, viola da gamba, Antonio Politano, flauto dolce basso
44. "Quattro poemetti", per violoncello ed amplificazione (1993) (18') Commande de Radio France (disco Happy new ear CA9810) 31 gennaio 1994 Paris, Présences 94, Maison de la Radio, Salle Messiaen, Alain Meunier, violoncello, Sy.Te.R du G.R.M.
45. "Tà paràthura (Le finestre)"- da "Un Quaderno di Kostantinos Kavafis Constantine P. Cavafy", per violino solo (1994) (10'). Turin, Galleria d’Arte Moderna, 25 giugno 1995, Enzo Porta
46. "Epéstrephe (Ritorna)"- da "Un Quaderno di Kostantinos Kavafis", per viola d'amore e chitarra a dodici corde (1994) (12') – Rome, 23 giugno 1996, Acquario, Luca Sanzò, Viola d'amore, Stefano Cardi, chitarra
47. "Toù plòiou (A bordo)" – da "Un Quaderno di Kostantinos Kavafis", per arpa (1994) (10') Turin, 8 giugno 1994, Gabriella Bosio
48. "Hedoné" (Alla voluttà), da "Un Quaderno di Kostantinos Kavafis", per voce, violino e pianoforte (1994)(12'). Faenza, Teatro Comunale, 5 novembre 1994, Barbara Lazotti, voce, Sabina Moretti, violino, Bo Price, pianoforte
49. "Phonés (Voci)", da "Un Quaderno di Kostantinos Kavafis", per voce e sonagli (1994)(12'). 24 ottobre 1996 Beijing Conservatory, Luisa Castellani, soprano
50. "I toni della notte", per clavicembalo a tre tastiere con amplificazione ad libitum (1995) (10'). 13 settembre 1995 Tokyo, Tsuda Hall, Natsu Yoko – clavicembalo
51. "Tre canti ebraici" per due violoncelli (1995) (10') Casale Monferrato, Sinagoga, 10 aprile 1995, Renzo Brancaleon e Erica Patrucco, violoncelli
52. "Tre poesie T'ang" per pianoforte e gruppi di strumenti (flauto – anche ottavino e flauto in sol, oboe – –anche corno inglese, clarinetto – anche clarinetto piccolo, clarinetto basso, corno, 2 percussioni, arpa, 2 violini, viola, violoncello e contrabbasso) (1995) (18')(Disco Stradivarius, STR 33572) 22 luglio 1995 Venezia, La Biennale Musica, Divertimento Ensemble, direttore Sandro Gorli
53. "Sarabanda, Sarabanda fiorita, Sarabanda sfiorita" per violoncello solo (6’) (1995) Colma di Rosignano, 11 giugno 1995, Erica Patrucco
54. "Threnos" per trio d'archi (1996) (12') 24 aprile 1999 Taskent, Festival di Musica Nuova, Xenia Ensemble
55. "Il lago notturno/il cielo stellato" (12') secondo trio per violino, violoncello e pianoforte (1996) (disco Moto Perpetuo, Pescocostanzo 1996) – Pescocostanzo, 23 luglio 1996, Steven Neugarten Trio
56. "Le azzurre campane della sera" (12') per 17 archi (1996) Turin, 27 settembre 1996, Conservatorio di Torino, Antidogma Musica, direttore Guido Guida
57. "Fioriture" (18') per Gu Q'in e 11 strumenti ( flauto, oboe – anche corno inglese, clarinetto – anche clarinetto basso, corno, percussioni, arpa, 2 violini, viola, violoncello e contrabbasso) (1996)- Milan, 28 ottobre 1996 Sala Puccini – La Scala, Divertimento Ensemble, Luca Bonvini, Gu Q’in, direttore Sandro Gorli
58. "Fioriture II" (18') per viola solista e 11 strumenti soprano ( flauto, oboe – anche corno inglese, clarinetto – anche clarinetto basso, corno, percussioni, arpa, 2 violini, viola, violoncello e contrabbasso) (1996/97) (Disco Stradivarius, STR 33572) Mosca, 24/1071997 Moscow Conservatory, Rachmaninov Hall, Giovanni Cavalli, viola, Orchestra dell'OSER, direttore Giorgio Bernasconi
59. "5 Trakl-Lieder" (10') per mezzosoprano e pianoforte (1997) Manta, 22 settembre 1997, Festival di Antidogma Musica, Marinella Tarenghi- pianoforte, Elena Custer – mezzo-soprano
60. "Cantico Notturno" (12') per 12 voci e percussioni (1997) Milan, 21 ottobre 1998, Festival Milano Musica-La Scala, Camerata Polifonica, direttore Ruben Jais (Edizioni Nuova Stradivarius) (Disco Stradivarius 33858)
61. Il Re – monodramma su testo di Carlo Cignetti, per recitante, flauto ( e flauto in sol), clarinetto basso, violino, violoncello, chitarra, pianoforte e mezzo-soprano ad lib.(18') (1997) Rome, 10 maggio 1999, Accademia Filarmonica Romana, Freon Ensemble e Burattinmusica
62. "Sciofar" per fagotto (8’) (1998)
63. "Due moti d’acqua" per due pianoforti (1995–1998) (15’) Sermoneta, 4 luglio 1998, Festival Pontino, Duo Notarstefano-Risaliti
64. "Isole" livre pour violoncelle (e nastro ad lib.) (25’) (1998) (disco I concerti di Brunnenburg, Merano TR CD001, 1999) – Berlino, 27 settembre 1999, Festival Musica Elettronica, Francesco Dillon – violoncello, Folkmar Hein – elettronica dal vivo
65. "Itaca è questa..." per canto e pianoforte, su testo dall’Ulisse di Claudio Monteverdi (4’) (1998). Rome, 13 novembre 1998, Villa Medici, Festival Roma Europa, Rosa Ricciotti, voce, Felice Venanzoni, pianoforte
66. "Costellazioni" per chitarra solista e gruppo di strumenti (1999) (15’) (inedito) (Disco Stradivarius, STR 33572). Berlino, 15 giugno 1999 SFB, Kleine Saal: Portät Konzert Giulio Castagnoli, Divertimento Ensemble, Elena Casoli chitarrista, direttore Sandro Gorli
67. "Un raga" per due violini (1998) (6’) Merano, 14 luglio 1998, Biblioteca Civica, Giacomo Agazzini e Umberto Fantini
68. "Un canto" per violoncello e pianoforte (1999) (2’)
69. "...pour vous dire..." per pianoforte solo (1999–2004) (4’)
70. "Je reprends la plume..." per controtenore e trio d’archi, su testo tratto da una lettera di Puskin (1999)(7’). Rome, 17 ottobre 1999, Ambasciata Britannica, David James – controtenore e Xenia Ensemble
71. "Laudi per doppio coro e orchestra" (testi: dai Salmi e da Sant'Ambrogio) (1999) (15’) (Disco Stradivarius, STR 33576). Milan, 29 novembre 1999, Sant’Ambrogio, Camerata Polifonica di Milano, Orchestra dei Pomeriggi Musicali, direttore Sandro Gorli
72. "Finale (il mare)" per sette strumenti ed elettronica (1999)(8’) Milan, 22 novembre 1999, Palazzo Reale, Freon Ensemble diretto da Stefano Cardi
73. "Maqam, eine Vervanderung fuer Bruno Canino", per pianoforte solo Milan, 16 maggio 2000, Bruno Canino
74. "Chet" per tromba, percussioni (3 piatti sospesi, vibrafono), contrabbasso (2001) (8’) Cologne, 23 marzo 2001, Istituto Italiano di Cultura, Freon Ensemble
75. "Ritorna" per violoncello con sordina di legno, vibrafono con archetto e tamburo in re (o darabukka) (2001) (8’). Lucca, 15 giugno 2001, Associazione Musicale Lucchese,
76. "Concerto per violoncello e doppia orchestra" (2001–2002) (40’) Commissione dell’Accademia di Santa Cecilia – Fondazione, Rome 30 novembre 2002, Accademia di Santa Cecilia, Enrico Dindo, violoncello, direttore Stefan Anton Reck
77. "Madrigale guerriero e amoroso", per sei voci e sei strumenti cinesi di tradizione, su testo di Francesco Petrarca (2002) (12’) (anche in versione per sei voci a cappella s., s., c., t., b., b.). Melbourne, 30 Ostober 2002, Melbourne Festival, The Song Company-Sidney e Hong Kong Virtuosi, direttore Roland Peelman (Edizioni Nuova Stradivarius) (Disco Stradivarius 33858)
78. "Concerto per pianoforte e orchestra" (2003) (26’) Turin, 10 giugno 2003, Accademia Stefano Tempia, Francesco Cipolletta, pianoforte, direttore Massimo Peiretti
79. Note del tuono per violoncello e clavicembalo (2003) (6’) Palermo, 25 maggio 2003, Anna Damiani, clavicembalo, Francesco Dillon, violoncello
80. Terzo Trio (note del tuono) per violino, violoncello e pianoforte preparato con fogli di carta Zagrabia, 20 aprile 2007, Biennale, Trio Debussy
81. Pasi but but per elettronica (2003) (4’) Cagliari, Spazio Musica, 7 giugno 2003
82. Anna e Davide, opera da camera per bambini attori e cantori, attrice, attore, chitarra e violoncello da pagine di diari di bambini deportati nei Lager (libretto dell’autore) (50’) (2003) Casale Monferrato, 14 settembre 2003, Sinagoga, L’Opera dei Ragazzi, Erica Patrucco, violoncello, Oscar Casares, chitarra
83. Notturno (Wasserklavier II) per fl. (e fl. in sol), cl.basso, v.no., vlc., pianoforte preparato con fogli di carta (2003) (14’) Bologna, 7 febbraio 2004, Accademia Filarmonica, Ensemble dell’Associazione Musicale Lucchese, direttore Fabio Neri
84. Vago, vago augelletto per Di-zi (fl.cinese), Sheng (organo a bocca cinese) e trio d’archi (2003) (6’) Caraglio, 11 dicembre 2003 Il Filatoio, The Hong Kong Virtuosi e Trio Xenia
85. Un dragone in gabbia, opera per attore, sei voci madrigalistiche, gruppi di strumenti ed elettronica (libretto dell’autore, dai Pisan Cantos di Ezra Pound nella versione di Mary de Rachewiltz) (2004) (85’) Turin, 20 maggio 2004, Piccolo Regio, Syryn Ensemble- Stoccolma, Riccardo Balbinutti, elettronica realizzata alla Technische Universität Berlin, direttore Carlo Pavese
86. Canti Pisani, per quattro voci, quattro strumenti e pianoforte (testo tratto dai Pisan Cantos di Ezra Pound nella versione italiana di Mary de Rachewiltz) (2005) (15’) Saarbrücken, Radio del Saarland, 7 maggio 2005, Neue Vocalsolisten Stuttgart (Edizioni Nuova Stradivarius) (Disco Stradivarius 33858)
87. Arco, per violoncello concertante e orchestra d’archi (2006) (16’) Turin, 27 marzo 2006, Dario Destefano, violoncello, Orchestra Stefano Tempia, Massimo Peiretti, direttore
88. Missa Sancti Evasii, per coro ed orchestra di strumenti barocchi (testi: Ordinarium Missae) (2007) (25’) Casale Monferrato, Duomo, 6 Ostober 2007 Coro Ruggero Maghini, Orchestra Barocca Academia Montis Regalis, direttore Claudio Chiavazza (Edizioni Nuova Stradivarius) (Disco Stradivarius 33858)
89. Altre stelle, per fl. In sol, chitarra, vibrafono e tabla (o pakhawaj, o darabuqqa) (2008) (12’) Milan, Palazzina Liberty, 5 maggio 2008, Divertimento Ensemble, direttore Sandro Gorli
90. Sagittario, per fl. in sol, cl.basso, violino e violoncello (2008) (3’) Terni, 7 settembre 2008, Ensemble In Canto, direttore Fabio Maestri
91. Due canti antichi per violino e shamisen (2008) (9’) Osaka, 19 dicembre 2008, Saji Keizo Memorial Hall, Osaka University Nakanoshima Center, Francesco D’Orazio, violino, Rokunobu Kineya e Nobuzo Kineya, shamisen
92. Canto antico per violino solo (2009) (6’) Turin, 14 settembre 2009, Settembre Musica, Massimo Marin
93. Quarto Trio (Kaddish) per violino, violoncello e pianoforte (2009) (9’) Turin, 14 settembre 2009, Settembre Musica, Teatro Gobetti, Francesco Cipolletta, pianoforte, Dario Destefano, violoncello, Massimo Marin, violino
94. Musiche per il Castello del Monferrato, musica elettronica (Casale Monf., 13 ottobre 2009) (15’)
95. Raga Rimirar le Stelle, per violoncello solo (Turin, 8 dicembre 2009, SS.Pietro e Paolo, Dario Destefano) (10’)
96. Come una fantasia triste, per 6 violoncelli (Turin, 31 ottobre 2010, Politecnico, CelloConsort) (6’)
97. Kaddish, per violoncello solo (Turin, 25 gennaio 2011, Dario Destefano, violoncello) (4')
98. "Laudate pueri" per coro di voci bianche (2011) (5')
99. Tehillah per sei voci (2013) (5') (Turin, Festival Laudes Paschales Aprile 2013, Ensemble Vocale Resonare – Marco Chiappero)
100. "Concerto triplo per violino, viola, violoncello e orchestra" (2015/16) (25') (Turin, 21/3/2016, Massimo Marin – violino, Maurizio Redegoso Kharitian – viola, Dario Destefano – violoncello, Orchestra dell'Accademia Stefano Tempia, direttore Guido Guida)
101. Eine Veränderung (2016) (3') (inedito) per cl., fg., cr., p.fte, quartetto d'archi, Milan, 18/1/2017, Divertimento Ensemble, direttore Sandro Gorli
102. Hallelujah per Gilberto Bosco per pianoforte (2016) (3') (inedito) Turin, 3/12/2017, Cecilia Novarino, pianoforte
103. Piccola Suite per violino e viola (2017) (12') (inedito)
104. Bella, bella ciao per coro di voci giovanili a tre parti (2018) (4') (inedito) Casale Monferrato, 25/1/2018, coro L'Opera dei Ragazzi diretto da Erica Patrucco
105. Fandango, dal Fandango di Antonio Soler (2019) (14') per mandolino e clavicembalo (inedito) Milan, 5/9/2019, Anna Schivazappa, mandolino, Fabio Antonio Falcone, clavicembalo
106. Trasfigurazioni e passaggi (meditazioni sullo Stabat Mater di Alessandro Scarlatti) per viola da gamba e violoncello (2019) (12') (inedito) Turin, 10/4/2019, Iris Faceto, viola da gamba, Dario Destefano, violoncello
107. Quattro Rebus di Leonardo per due sassofoni (soprano e baritono) e pianoforte (2019) (7') (inedito) Saint-Jean- Cap-Ferrat, 17/8/2019, Nino Mollica, sax soprano, Enea Tonetti, sax baritono, Yanya Cohen, pianoforte
108. Ouverture per orchestra (Had Gadyà Monferrina) (2019) (8') (inedito)
109. Parafrasi - tre canti per voce (mezzo-soprano) e nove strumenti (2020) (14') (inedito)
110. Passaggio per violoncello e viola da gamba (1994-2020) (7') (inedito)
111. Ed or si scriva... per clarinetto di bassetto (altre versioni: clarinetto in sib e clarinetto basso)(2020) (7') (inedito)
112. Giochi con Domenico Scarlatti, un preludio, cinque interludi e un postludio per pianoforte (2020) (14') (inedito)
113. Requies, Parafrasi IV per cantus firmus e nove strumenti (Fl e ott., Fl e fl in sol, cl., pianof., arpa, violino, viola, violoncello e contrabbasso) (6')(anche in versione per cantus firmus, due tube, quattro percussionisti, armonium, pianoforte e audio registrato, organo eolico Ghau Kilori, delle Isole Salomone), Lucca, Festival Lucca Classica, 15/7/2021, Associazione Musicale Lucchese, direttore Remo Pieri
114. Preludio e recitativo per chitarra (1980-revisione 2021) (5')
115. Tre Improvvisi per pardessus di viola e violoncello (2021) (9')
116. Tanto più dolce armonia(2021) (6') per sax soprano e baritono, e pianoforte, Saint-Jean- Cap-Ferrat, 21/08/2021, Nino Mollica e Enea Tonetti, sassofoni, Vanya Cohen, pianoforte
117. All'etterna fontana (2021) (6') per voce, due sassofoni e pianoforte, Saint-Jean- Cap-Ferrat, 21/08/2021, Maria Agricola, soprano, Nino Mollica e Enea Tonetti, sassofoni, Vanya Cohen, pianoforte
118. Tre Invenzioni per due sax soprani (2021) (10')
119. In Alto - Tre Illustrazioni per viola sola (2021) (9')
120. Notturno per violino solo in sordino (5') (2021), Lucca, Villa Reale di Marlia,2/07/2022, Alberto Bologni, violino
121. Tre illustrazioni per violino solo (2021) (9'30)
122. Tre improvvisi per viola e violoncello ((2022) (9')
123. Quarto Quartetto per archi (2022)(14')
124. E...si fussi pisci (II) - (2022) (3')per coro a cappella
125. Berceuse per fl., cl. e chitarra alla memoria di Paolo Castaldi (2022), Ferrara, Festival Mixxer, Ridotto del Teatro Comunale, 4/06/2022, Morena Mestieri, flauto, Claudio Miotto, clarinetto, Stefano Cardi, chitarra
126. Folk song (2022) (8'), per voce, clarinetto, vibrafono, chitarra folk e violoncello, Rome, Festival di Nuova Consonanza,14/11/2022, Freon Ensemble
127. A love folksong (2022) (5'), per voce, sax soprano, sax baritono e pianoforte, Saint-Jean- Cap-Ferrat, 20/08/2022, Anna Delfino, soprano, Nino Mollica e Enea Tonetti, sassofoni, Vanya Cohen, pianoforte
128. Kaddish Le'ela per 8 violoncelli 2022 (2'30)
129. Folk songs III per viola e violoncello (2022) (8'), Turin, Chiesa di San Secondo, 6/12/2022, Giacomo Indemini, viola, Dario Destefano, violoncello
130. Ora-forse-mai più per voce, sax soprano, sax baritono, vibrafono e pianoforte (2022)
131. Autunno, quasi un folksong, rileggendo Autumn di Charles Ives, per voce e ensemble (6') (2023) Turin, Centro italiano per la Fotografia, 5/06/2023, Laura Capretti.voce, Tommaso Santini – violino, Lucia Sacerdoni – violoncello, Edoardo Momo – pianoforte, Francesco Parod - percussioni
132. Tre intonazioni ebraiche (2023) (12') per fagotto, violoncello e clavicembalo, violoncello - Erica Patrucco, fagotto - Franco Taulino, clavicembalo - Giulio Castagnoli, Sinagoga, Casale Monferrato, 18/06/2023
133. Aleichem shalom per orchestra (2023)(4'30) sopra un canto ebraico monferrino
134. Hov Areq, an Armenian Folksong per voce e quattro strumentisti (2023) (5') per voce con tamburello basco, vibrafono e darabukka, violino, violoncello e pianoforte

== Short Discography ==
- Giulio Castagnoli (disco monografico), CD Adda Records (1990)
- Al Museo in volo & a zompi (opera buffa completa), CD Nuova Fonit Cetra (1991)
- 900 Musica – Elision Ensemble, CD RCA BGM/Ariola (1992)
- Giulio Castagnoli (disco monografico), CD Stradivarius (2000)
- LmcsL Messa, CD Stradivarius (2001)
- Giulio Castagnoli, Missa Sancti Evasii e musica vocale (disco monografico), CD Stradivarius (2010) The Song Company, Hong Kong Virtuosi, Syrin? Ensemble, Stockholm, Orchestra Barocca Academia Montis Regalis

== Bibliography ==
=== Essays on Giulio Castagnoli's work, interviews ===
- Adriano Cremonese, Suono e segno: alcune note sul Quartetto 1989 di Giulio Castagnoli, in "Quaderni Perugini di Musica Contemporanea", n.25, 1989
- Gian Paolo Minardi, Comporre il mistero, in "La Gazzetta di Parma", 30 April 1992
- Luciana Galliano, Giulio Castagnoli: sculture sonore tra witz ed elegia, in "Sonus", annoIV, nn.1/2 (May 1992)
- Susanna A. Forchino, Giulio Castagnoli – intervista, in "La musica italiana oggi: le poetiche delle ultime generazioni", tesi di laurea, Università di Torino, a.a. 1990/91
- Catia Pazzaglini, Giulio Castagnoli in "La musica oggi negli spettacoli di prosa", Tesi di Laurea, Università di Urbino (a.a. 1993/94)
- Angela Ida De Benedictis, Quattro poemetti, in "Di nuovo musica", Reggio Emilia 1997
- Martin Wilkening, Giulio Castagnoli, «DAAD Letter», n.2, Bonn 1999
- Anna Maria Morazzoni, «The New Growe Dictionary of Music & Musicians», vol. 2, 2000
- Angela Ida De Benedictis, Giulio Castagnoli, in MGG, vol.3, 2000
- Rita Gaiozzi, Il violoncello solo nella musica contemporanea, tesi di laurea, Università di Pisa (a.a. 2000/01)
- Alberto Bosco, Il mio concerto per pianoforte, tradizione popolare trasfigurata, in: Sistema Musica, anno V, n.6/2003
- Alberto Bosco, Castagnoli: Pound, un dragone in gabbia, in Sistema Musica, anno VI, n.5/2004
- Mirco Rizzotto, Al Museo in volo e a zompi, tesi di laurea, Università di Torino- Multidams (a.a. 2005/06)
- Guido Viale, Intervista a C.Castagnoli, in: Mosaico – C.E.M., 20 December 2005

=== Essays and books by Giulio Castagnoli ===
==== Books ====
- Al Museo in volo e a zompi (con Ugo Nespolo), Milan, Nuova ERI, 1989
- Klang und Prozess in den Quattro pezzi per orchestra(1959) von Giacinto Scelsi, Saarbrücken, Pfau Verlag, 1995
- Trasparenze (con Marco Gastini), Milan, Vanni Scheiwiller Editore, 1998
- Le forme della musica, Casale Monferrato, Edizioni Sonda, 2009

==== Essays ====
- Gesto, figura, nostalgia, in "I quaderni della Scuola Civica di Musica di Milano", n.13, December 1986
- Il compositore d’oggi e la musica per banda, in "Piemonte Musicale", n.2, II Semestre 1986
- Suono e processo nei Quattro pezzi per orchestra (1959) di Giacinto Scelsi, in "Quaderni di Musica Nuova ", n.1, Turin 1987
- Portrait, note su Franco Donatoni, in "Quaderni di Musica Nuova", n.2, Turin 1988
- Un Adieu, in "MusikTexte", n.26, Ottobre 1988
- La scrittura del suono, in "Quaderni Perugini di Musica Contemporanea", n.33, 1989
- Note a Paolo Castaldi, in "Quaderni di Musica Nuova", n.3, Turin 1989
- Il percorso dei "Quaderni di Musica Nuova" di Torino, in "Sonus", anno II, n.4 (1990)
- Riflessioni sulla musica alla radio, in "Sonus", anno V, n.3/4 (1993)
- Giulio Castagnoli – uno sguardo al futuro, tavola rotonda di Sonus, in "Sonus", anno VI, n.1 (1994)
- La conscience aigüe – note sullo scriver musica oggi, in La conscience aigue, "Quaderni di Musica Nuova", nn.4/5, Turin 1994.
- Cloches en noir et blanc, Tre poesie T’ang, in "L’ora di là del tempo", catalogo 46.a Biennale di Venezia, Ricordi 1995
- L’attesa, l’ascolto, il richiamo. Un’interpretazione di alcuni canti schumanniani, in I Lieder di Schumann, "Quaderni di Musica Nuova" n.6, Turin 1996
- A proposito di Three pieces for piano di Brian Ferneyhough, in "Catalogo del Concorso Pianistico "Micheli", Milan 1997
- I compositori romantici e quelli d’oggi, in " L’indice ", giugno 1998
- La musica vera, in "Nc news, bollettino di Nuova Consonanza", ottobre 1998
- Berio, il tempo e l’armonia, in Enzo Restagno (ed.) "Sequenze per Luciano Berio", Milan, Ricordi, 2000
- G. Kurtág: un ritratto per frammenti, in G. Castagnoli (ed.), "Materiali per leggere Kurtag", Turin 2001
- Gilberto Bosco, voce della M.G.G., Baerenreiter Verlag, 2001
- Paolo Castaldi, voce della M.G.G., Baerenreiter Verlag, 2001
- Sergio Liberovici, voce della M.G.G., Baerenreiter Verlag, 2002
- La lezione di Scelsi, Il Giornale della Musica, gennaio 2005
- Sculture di suono, Il Monferrato, 28 October 2005
- Musica scritta o musica orale? le riflessioni di un compositore, Sistema Musica, anno VII n.10/2005

=== Music editions ===
Giulio Castagnoli's works are published by:

- BMG-Ricordi, Milan
- Edizioni Suvini Zerboni, Milan
- Casa Musicale Sonzogno, Milan
- Edipan, Rome
