= Franco Donatoni =

Italian composer

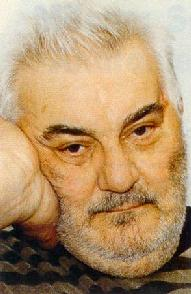
Franco Donatoni

Franco Donatoni (9 June 1927 – 17 August 2000) was an Italian composer.

== Biography ==
Born in Verona, Donatoni started studying violin at the age of seven, and frequented the local music academy. Later, he studied at the Milan Conservatory and, from 1948, at the Bologna Conservatory.

At least three generations of composers studied with Donatoni. Among his Italian pupils were Sandro Gorli, Roberto Carnevale, Giulio Castagnoli, Ivan Fedele, Luca Mosca, Riccardo Piacentini, Fausto Romitelli, Luc Brewaeys, Pietro Borradori, Giuseppe Sinopoli, Alessandro Solbiati, and Piero Niro; his foreign pupils include Michael Dellaira, Pascal Dusapin, Sylvie Bodorová, Esa-Pekka Salonen, Magnus Lindberg, Katia Tiutiunnik, Javier Torres Maldonado, and Juan Trigos. See: List of music students by teacher: C to F#Franco Donatoni.

Donatoni died in Milan in 2000.

His music appears on the CD labels Stradivarius, Kairos, and Neos.
