= Dynamism =

Dynamism may refer to:

- Dynamism (metaphysics), a cosmological explanation of the material world
- Dynamicism, the application of dynamical systems theory to cognitive science
- Economic dynamism, a term related to the rate of change of an economy
- "Plastic dynamism", a term used by the Italian futurist art movement to describe an object's intrinsic and extrinsic motion

== See also ==
- Dunamis (disambiguation)
