= Marij Kogoj =

Slovenian composer

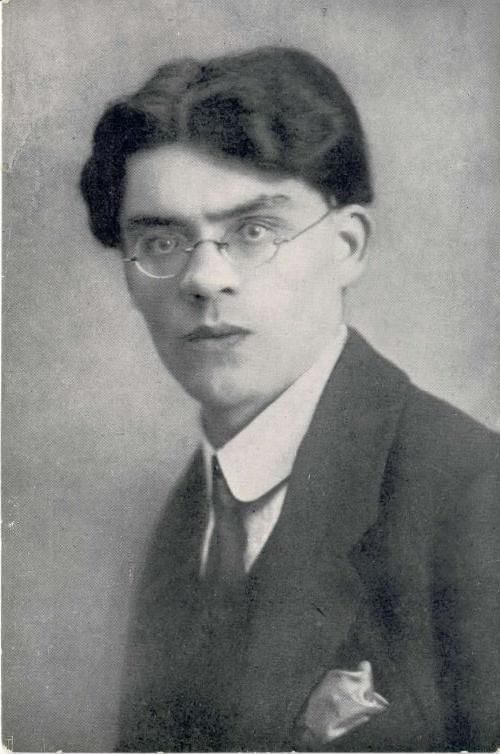
Marij Kogoj

Marij Julij Kogoj (Trieste, 20 September 1892 – Ljubljana, 25 February 1956) was a Slovenian composer and writer of Italian birth. He is noted for his expressionist music, including the opera Črne maske (Black Masks), work that was well received in 1920s Slovenia amid a flowering of avant-garde artistic, cultural, and political movements. As a young man, he studied with Franz Schreker and then Arnold Schoenberg. In 1932, schizophrenia ended his career prematurely. His music and milieu is receiving renewed attention in the 21st century, but he remains little known internationally.

== Biography and music ==
Kogoj was born an orphan in Trieste, where he was misidentified as his deceased brother Marij (27 April 1895 – 31 January 1896). In 1910, he began composing as a self-taught musician while at school in Gorizia (1907–1914). He studied counterpoint and composition with Franz Schreker at the Vienna Music Academy (1914–1917) and then continued his studies with Arnold Schoenberg at Eugenie Schwarzwald's school (1918). In 1919, he married Marija Podlogar.

Among the Slovenian avant-garde, Kogoj was an especially prominent figure between 1919 and 1922. He performed his own music as part of the September 1920 Novomeška pomlad (Novo Mesto Spring), an exhibition sponsored by Fran Windischer and painter Rihard Jakopič in Novo Mesto that brought together many avant-garde artists such as futurist poet Anton Podbevšek, painter Božidar Jakac, singer Zdenka Ziková, and poet Miran Jarc. This gathering is considered to be the beginning of the avant-garde in Slovenia. It arose from nascent futurist and constructivist artistic activity in the region, often with some left-wing political affinity. (Note: Subsequent Slovenian avant-garde circles, a second and third, formed around poet Srečko Kosovel in the early 1920s and then painter Avgust Černigoj in Trieste during the middle of the 1920s. There were no other Slovenian avant-garde circles until the 1960s Skupina OHO.)

In 1922, Podbevšek, Kogoj, and theater critic Josip Vidmar issued a journal named Trije labodje (Three Swans) after the example of Der Blaue Reiter. Veno Pilon painted Kogoj in The Portrait of the Composer Marij Kogoj (1923), an oil on canvas now at the Museum of Modern Art, Ljubljana. Polona Tratnik wrote that Pilon captured Kogoj's "eccentricity and enigmatic nature"—perhaps signs of his later mental illness, she speculated.

He spent most of his life in Ljubljana, where he was a music critic. He was also a répétiteur at the Slovenian National Theatre Opera (1924–1932). For a time, he wrote expressionist music and enjoyed immense national popularity. Kogoj's late 1920s opera Črne maske (Black Masks) was an artistic success and is his most prominent work. Vidmar compared it to Alban Berg's Wozzeck as another notable expressionist opera he knew.

Kogoj's career ended abruptly with a 1932 schizophrenia diagnosis. He remained institutionalized until his death in 1956. His plans for a systematic approach to atonal harmony via "chord permutations", which anticipated the compositional procedures of Schoenberg and Josef Matthias Hauer, remained unfinished. Like many artists of Slovenian avant-garde circles, he is now little known.

== Discography and performances ==
Discography

- Complete Works for Violin & Piano, Črtomir Šiškovič (violin) and Emanuele Arciuli. (Stradivarius, 2000)

Performances

- Črne maske (Black Masks), performed January 2012
