= Dunamis (disambiguation) =

Dunamis (Ancient Greek: δύναμις) is a Greek philosophical concept meaning "power", "potential" or "ability", and is central to the Aristotelian idea of potentiality and actuality.

Dunamis or Dynamis may also refer to:

- Dynamis (Bosporan queen), a Roman client queen of the Bosporan Kingdom
- Dynamis (beetle), a weevil genus of the tribe Rhynchophorini
- Dynamis (journal), a semi-annual medical journal
- Dynamis Ensemble, an instrumental group from Italy
- Dynamis (Negima! Magister Negi Magi), a character in the manga series Negima!
