= Goldoni (surname) =

Goldoni is an Italian surname. Notable people with the surname include:

- Carlo Goldoni (1707–1793), Italian playwright and librettist from the Republic of Venice
- Eleonora Goldoni (born 1996), Italian footballer
- Gaetana Goldoni (1768–1830), Italian actress
- Giorgio Goldoni (born 1954), Italian volleyball player
- Jess Goldoni, American politician
- Lelia Goldoni (1936–2023), American actress
- Luca Goldoni (1928–2023), Italian writer and journalist

== See also ==
- Goldoni (disambiguation)
