= OFT =

OFT may refer to:

== Spaceflight ==
- Orion Flight Test 1 (5 December 2014), first test flight of the Orion Multi-Purpose Crew Vehicle
- Boeing Orbital Flight Test (Boe-OFT; Boe-OFT-1; 20 December 2019), an uncrewed CST-100 Starliner spacecraft flight test
- Boeing Orbital Flight Test 2 (Boe-OFT-2; May 2022), an uncrewed CST-100 Starliner spacecraft flight test
- SpaceX Starship orbital test flight (OFT; April 2023), a SpaceX test flight for Super Heavy and Starship

== Other uses ==
- The Turin Philharmonic Orchestra (Orchestra Filarmonica di Torino), an Italian orchestra referred to as OFT for short
- The former Office of Fair Trading in the United Kingdom
- Ordnance Factory Tiruchirappalli, a defense company based in Tiruchirappalli, Tamil Nadu
- Optimal foraging theory, a theory that organisms forage so as to maximize their net energy intake per unit time
- Ohio Federation of Teachers
