= Pietro Borradori =

Italian composer and pianist

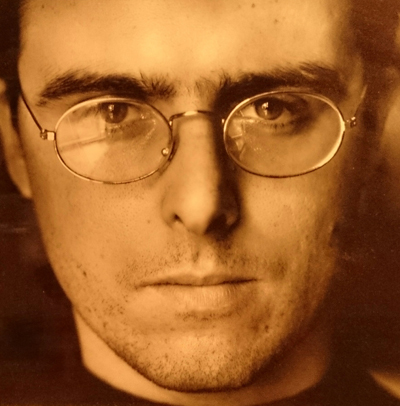
Pietro Borradori

Pietro Borradori (Milan, 1965) is an Italian composer and pianist.

== Biography ==
He began to play Piano at the age of 8 years-old. At 12, he started to compose his first short pieces for piano. He then studied Piano with Carlo Pestalozza in Milan, graduated in Musical Composition at the Conservatory of Milan with Giacomo Manzoni, and at Accademia Chigiana of Siena with Franco Donatoni. He subsequently studied in Freiburg with Emmanuel Nunes and in Paris with Gerard Grisey. In addition to his musical formation he studied Architecture at the Politecnico of Milan. From 1987 to 1992 he taught Composition at the Conservatory of Music of Trento. His pieces has been performed by the main European Ensembles and Orchestras. He received among others commissions from institutions like Radio France, French Ministere of Culture, West Deutscher Rundfunk, Radio Televisione Italiana, Nederlands Radio Symphonic Orchestra, Festival Milano Musica, Fondazione Roma Europa, Gulbenkian Foundation. He recorded monographic CDs for Fonit Cetra and BMG Ricordi labels. The works from 1987 to 1994 has been published by BMG Ricordi.

Besides his activity as a composer, he acted as music promoter and artistic director as well as entrepreneur in the information technology field. In 1989 he founded together with Riccardo Nova and Andreas Dohmen the Nuove Sincronie Festival of Contemporary Music; he was in charge of the artistic direction of that Festival for all the ten seasons of its life. He founded at the same time the Ensemble Nuove Sincronie, an Instrumental Ensemble dedicated to the new music repertoire.

In 1995 he founded Allegroassai, a Software House dedicated to the development of a new Music Notation Technology called Vivaldi, and the online Interactive Sheet Music Library project Vivaldistudio and in 2008 SimilarPages. a Specialized Search Engine designed to easily find similar and alternatives websites.

Since 2015 his interest has shifted towards the neoclassical field, minimalism and electronic music.

== Discography ==
- 1990 - Camera Obscura (Italy, Fonit Cetra)
- 1994 - Opus Incertum (Italy, BMG Ricordi)
- 1993 - Nuove Sincronie 92 (Italy, Sincronie)
- 1993 - Contemporanea Koine (Italy, Stile Libero)

== Works ==
- 1985 - Epilogo, for Piano
- 1986 - Textualist textures I, for Trio
- 1986 - Textualist textures II, for Quintet
- 1987 - Dialogues entre Metopes, for Ensemble
- 1987 - Epigram for Morton Feldman, for Flute
- 1987 - Fragmenta Veneris, for Ensemble
- 1988 - Holzwege, for Ensemble
- 1989 - Camera Obscura, for Piano Quartett
- 1990 - Streichquartett N.1, for String Quartett
- 1990 - Zwei Orgelstucke, for Organ
- 1990 - Puer Senex, for Orchestra
- 1991 - Dialectical Landscapes, for Cello and Piano
- 1991 - Pan, for Orchestra
- 1992 - Opus Incertum, for Ensemble
- 1992 - Opus Quadratum, for Octet
- 1992 - Opus Alexandrinum, for Cello and Ensemble
- 1992 - Cantata Puer Aeternus, for Choir, Soloists, and Chamber Orchestra
- 1993 - Trame perdute, for 2 Pianos
- 1993 - Dialectical Landscapes III, for Trio
- 1993 - Obliquo, for Marimba
- 1993 - Family Dancing, for Viola
- 1994 - In Medias Res, for Large Ensemble
- 1994 - Opus Ligneum, for Ensemble
- 1994 - Drei Blicke in einem Opal I, for Piano and Ensemble
- 1994 - Trame perdute II, for Piano
- 1996 - Drei Blicke in einem Opal II, for Piano and Ensemble
- 1997 - Fabulae, for Horn and String Orchestra
- 1997 - Persistency of the objects I, for Ensemble
- 1998 - Persistency of the objects II, for Ensemble
- 1998 - Pan II, for Ensemble
- 2005 - Project B, for Electronics
- 2011 - Pan II remixed, for Electronics
- 2014 - Etude pour piano, for Piano
- 2015 - Deux etudes pour piano, for Piano
- 2016 - Rem, for 2 Amplified Pianos & Electronics
- 2017 - Skew Lines #1, for solo piano
- 2020 - Dual, for 2 Pianos and 2 Cellos

== Main Prizes ==
- 1988 - 2nd Prize, RAI Radio Televisione Italiana 'Malipiero', Italy
- 1988 - 1st Prize, Kucyna Priza - ALEA III, United States
- 1989 - Finalist, Gaudeamus International Competition, Nederlands
- 1989 - 1st Prize, Forum Junger Komponist WDR, Germany
- 1990 - Finalist, Olympia Prize, Greece
- 1990 - Finalist, Gaudeamus International Competition, Nederlands
- 1991 - 1st Prize, Ensemblia International Competition WDR, Germany
- 1994 - 2nd Prize, Honour Mention Gaudeamus International Competition, Nederlands

In 1993 his Streichquartett N.1 has been selected from RAI Italian Radio Television, to represent Italy to the International Tribune of Contemporary Music 1993.
