= Paolo Cherici =

Italian lutenist

Paolo Cherici is an Italian lutenist. He has given performances all around the world, taking part in ancient music festivals.

He studied the guitar under Ruggero Chiesa, later continuing with lute studies at the Schola Cantorum in Basel with Hopkinson Smith and Eugen M. Dombois.

Cherici has made a large number of recordings, and some have received the highest critical praise (Diapason d'Or du Siècle).

He teaches at the Milan Conservatory.
