= Ada Gentile =

Italian pianist and composer (born 1947)

Ada Gentile (born 26 July 1947) is an Italian pianist and composer. She has taught at the Rome Conservatory and been artistic director of uovi Spazi Musicali, Rome, Goffredo Petrassi Chamber Orchestra, Rome and the opera house in Ascoli Piceno, and advisor to the Venice Biennale Festival. Her works have been performed internationally, and she was honoured by the Polish Ministry of Culture in 1988 ‘for cultural services’. She was also awarded the Cavaliere al merito of the Italian Republic.

== Life ==
Ada Gentile was born in Avezzano and attended the Conservatorio di St. Cecilia in Rome, graduating in piano and composition. She then completed a graduate degree in composition at the Accademia di Santa Cecilia with Goffredo Petrassi. She was successful in international competitions, including Gaudeamus in 1982, ISCM, Budapest in 1986 and Essen in 1995.

She has lectured at Northwestern University, Juilliard School, Wayne State University, Columbia University, the University of Chicago and the University of California, Berkeley in the United States and also widely in Europe and Asia. She was Deputy Director of St. Cecilia Conservatory from 1999 to 2005, and has been instrumental in organizing a number of music festivals. She was advisor to the Venice Biennale Festival from 1993 to 1997, and was artistic director of Nuovi Spazi Musicali, Rome, Goffredo Petrassi Chamber Orchestra, Rome and the opera house in Ascoli Piceno. From 1978 she taught at the Rome Conservatory.

Her works have been performed internationally.

Gentile was honoured by the Polish Ministry of Culture in 1988 ‘for cultural services’.

== Honors and awards ==
- Gaudeamus prize 1982
- ISCM Budapest prize 1986
- ISCM Essen prize 1995
- Cavaliere al merito of Italian Republic

== Works ==
Selected works include:

- Adagios for string orchestra (1993–94)
- Adagio for a Summer for flute and strings (1998)
- Concertante for flute, guitar and orchestra (1989)
- Concerto for Clarinet and Orchestra (1995)
- Concert ("Veni Lumen Cordis") for female voice (or B♭ clarinet) and orchestra (1993)
- Criptografia (Cryptography) for viola and chamber orchestra (1985)
- Two Episodes for organ, orchestra and voice in echo (1988)
- Flighty for orchestra (1982)
- Around for flute, clarinet and viola (1984)
- Insight for 2 violins and viola (1984)
- Perviolasola for viola solo (1987)
- Music Scene (1996)
- Piccolo concerto for chamber orchestra (1995)
- Shading for guitar and chamber orchestra (1988)
- Veränderungen for symphony orchestra (1976)
- Why Not? for orchestra (1985)
- She Begged My Mother for orchestra and narrator (2000)

== Discography ==
Gentile maintains an extended discography. Selected recording include:

- La voce contemporanea in Italia, Vol. 2 - Audio CD (Stradivarius, 2006) by Ennio Morricone, Bruno Maderna, Ada Gentile, Carlo Mosso, et al.
- Vittorio Fellegara: Requiem di Madrid, Die Irae, Notturno Ada Gentile: Criptografia, Shading - Audio CD by Ada Gentile, Vittorio Fellegara, Giulio Bertola, Lev Martkitz, et al.
- Paesaggi Della Mente - Audio CD by Ada Gentile and Manuel Zurria - flute
- Plot in Fiction - Audio CD (Aug. 27, 2002) by Enrico Correggia, Luca Francesconi, Giacinto Scelsi, Ada Gentile, et al.
- Musica De Camera - Audio CD (Dec. 12, 1995)
