= Ivan Fedele =

Italian composer

Ivan Rocco Fedele (born 6 May 1953 in Lecce) is an Italian composer. He studied at the Milan Conservatory.

Fedele's compositions are published by Edizioni Suvini Zerboni, and many of his works are recorded on Stradivarius Records.

== Selected works ==
Stage

- Oltre Narciso, Cantata profana for una azione scenica [Secular Cantata for a Scenic Action] for mezzo-soprano, baritone, 2 dancers, male chorus and small orchestra (1982); libretto by the composer
- Antigone, opera in 7 scenes (2005–2006); libretto after Sophocles by Giuliano Corti and the composer; premiere 24 April 2007, Teatro Comunale, Florence.

Orchestra

- Chiari (1981)
- Epos (1989)
- Carme for chamber orchestra (1992)
- Carme Secondo (1993)
- Allegoria dell'indaco for small orchestra (1994); original version for 11 instruments
- Scena (1997–1998)
- Codex for chamber orchestra (1999); arrangement of music by Johann Sebastian Bach
- Accord for chamber orchestra (2003)
- Ali di Cantor for 4 orchestral groups (2003)
- Artéteka, Folk Dance I (2009)
- Pentàlogon Quintet for string orchestra (1987, revised 2009); original version String Quartet No. 2 Pentàlogon Quartet
- Syntax 0.1 (if@hay.dn) for chamber orchestra (2009)
- Lexikon (2010)
- Nohtar for string orchestra (2009)

Concertante

- Concerto for viola and orchestra (1990, revised 1995)
- Duo en résonance for 2 horns and small orchestra (1991)
- Concerto for piano and orchestra (1993)
- Concerto for cello and orchestra (1996)
- Dioscuri for 2 cellos and orchestra (1997)
- Imaginary Depth for cello and chamber orchestra (1997)
- L'Orizzonte di Elettra for viola, chamber orchestra and live electronics (1997), or 5-string electric violin, chamber orchestra and live electronics (2011)
- Concerto for violin and small orchestra (1998–1999)
- Corda d'aria, Concerto for flute and orchestra (1999)
- De li duo soli et infiniti universi for 2 pianos and 3 orchestral groups (2001)
- Ruah, Concerto for flute and orchestra (2001–2002)
- Arco di Vento, Concerto for clarinet and orchestra (2002–2004)
- Est!, Concerto No. 2 for cello and small orchestra (2004–2005)
- Flug for bass clarinet and orchestra (2005)
- Mosaïque for violin and chamber orchestra (2008)
- La pierre et l'étang (…les temps…) for percussion and string quartet soloists, string orchestra and electronics (2010–2011)
- Txalaparta, Folk Dance II for 2 txalapartas and orchestra (2011)

Chamber and instrumental music

- Per accordar, String Quartet No. 1 (1980–1981, revised 1989)
- Aiscrim for flute, clarinet and piano (1983)
- Il Giardino di giada (The Jade Garden) for oboe d'amore, violin, viola and cello (1983), or for alto flute, violin, viola and cello (1991)
- Viaggiatori della notte for violin solo (1983)
- Electra Glide for 2 violins and viola (1984)
- Latinamix for guitar and piano with flute ad libitum (1985), or for flute, violin, piano (2004)
- Magic for 4 saxophones (1985), or for 4 clarinets (1996)
- Windex for clarinet (1985)
- Chord for 10 instruments (1986)
- Pentàlogon Quartet, String Quartet No. 2 (1987)
- Bias for oboe and guitar (1988)
- Modus for bass clarinet and percussion (1988, revised 1995)
- Allegoria dell'indaco for 11 instruments (1988); also for small orchestra
- Mixtim, Musica rituale for flute, oboe, clarinet, violin, viola, cello and piano (1989)
- Imaginary Sky-Lines for flute and arpa (1990)
- Donax for flute (1992)
- Imaginary Islands for flute, bass clarinet and piano (1992)
- Richiamo for 2 horns, 2 trumpets, 2 trombones, euphonium, percussion and live electronics (1993–1994, revised 2009)
- Flamen for flute, oboe, clarinet, horn and bassoon (1994)
- Profilo in Eco for flute and ensemble (1994–1995)
- Corrente for piano and 7 instruments (1996)
- High "in memoriam Miles Davis" for trumpet (1996)
- Corrente II for piano and 7 instruments (1997)
- Correnti alternate for piano and 7 instruments (1997)
- Donacis ambra for flute and live electronics (1997)
- Erinni for piano, cimbalom and vibraphone (1998)
- Notturno "in memoriam Goffredo Petrassi" for 4 ensembles (1998–2004)
- Elettra for viola and live electronics (1999)
- Târ, String Quartet No. 3 (1999–2000)
- Apostrofe for bass flute (2000)
- Dedica for flute (2000)
- Levante for cello, string quintet and cimbalom (2000); also for cello, string quintet and piano (2009)
- Accents for piano and string quartet (2001)
- Arcipelago Möbius for clarinet, violin, cello and double bass (2004)
  - Arc-en-ciel for cello (may be performed separately)
- Notturno for 11 players (1988–2004)
- Capt-Actions for accordion, string quartet and live electronics (2004–2005)
- Immagini da Escher for flute, clarinet, violin, cello, piano and percussion (2005)
- Palimpsest, String Quartet No. 4 (2006)
- Corrente for cello solo (2007)
- Notturno for 11 instruments (2009)
- Branle double for cello solo (2010)
- Preludio e ciaccona for cello solo (2010)
- Suite francese II for violin solo (2010)
- Suite francese III for cello solo (2010)
- Deystiviya for bayan and string quartet (2011)
- Suite francese V for harp (2011)
- Ritrovari, Suite francese VI for viola solo (2011)
- Breath and Break for brass trio and live electronics (2012)

Harpsichord

- Suite francese (2003)

Organ

- Flores for organ (1987)
- Sei Meditazioni for organ (2011)

Piano

- Sorpresa, Aiscrim II (1983); revised 1988 as Toccata
- Armoon "Armonie di luna" for 4 pianos (1983–1984)
- Toccata (1983, 1988)
- Études boréales (1990)
- 3 Cadenze (1993)
- Two Moons for 2 pianos and live electronics (2000)
- Études australes (2002–2003)
- Antipodes for piano (2005)
- Due notturni con figura for piano and live electronics (2007)
- Nachtmusik (2008)

Vocal

- E Poi... for soprano and 11 instruments (1982); words by Livia Lucchini
- Naturae, Madrigale metafisico (metaphysical madrigal) for countertenor, tenor and bass (1984)
- Orfeo al cinema Orfeo, Racconto in musica (musical story) for 2 narrators and MIDI keyboard (1994); words by Giuliano Corti
- Barbara Mitica, 20 radio paintings (1996); words by Giuliano Corti
- Maja for soprano, flute, clarinet, violin, cello, piano and vibraphone (1999); words by Giuliano Corti
- Paroles...., Due pezzi (2 pieces) for viola and female voice (2000)
- Paroles y Palabras for soprano and cello (1995–2000)
1. Allons (1995)
2. Ça Ira (1996)
3. Querida presencia (2000)
4. ¡Hasta siempre! (2000)
- Messages for 2 sopranos, 2 mezzo-sopranos and 8 instruments (2000)
- 33 Noms for 2 female voices and orchestra (2008); words by Marguerite Yourcenar
- En archè for soprano, violin and orchestra (2008)
- Morolòja kè erotikà for soprano and string quartet (2010–2011); words by Brizio Montinaro
- Morolòja kài Erotikà for soprano, percussion and string orchestra (2012); words by Brizio Montinaro
- Times Like That for soprano and orchestra (2012); words by Barack Obama, Lech Wałęsa and Aung San Suu Kyi

Choral

- Coram for soprano, bass, mixed chorus and orchestra (1995–1996); words by Giuliano Corti
- Coram Requiem for mezzo-soprano, bass, 2 narrators, mixed chorus, orchestra and live electronics (1996); words by Giuliano Corti
- Animus anima for 2 sopranos, mezzo-soprano, contralto, tenor and bass (2000); words by Giuliano Corti
- Odòs for mixed chorus and oboe (2004)
- Stabat mater for chorus and percussion (2007)
- Animus anima II for 2 sopranos, mezzo-soprano, countertenor, tenor, baritone and bass (2009); words by Giuliano Corti
- Thanatoseros for soprano, tenor and ensemble (2009)
- Cristaux de temps for chamber chorus (2010)
- Ās-lêb for mixed chorus and orchestra (2011)

Film scores

- La Chute de la maison Usher, Music for Jean Epstein's 1928 silent film for soprano and small orchestra (1995)

Electronic music

- Totem for tape (1980)
- Canone infinito for tape (2002)
