= Signor Goldoni =

2007 opera

Signor Goldoni is a 2007 English-language opera by Luca Mosca to a libretto by Pierluigi Melega. Melega's English libretto concerns the playwright Carlo Goldoni and his characters, but also incorporates elements from Shakespeare's plays set in the Veneto; Othello, Romeo and Juliet, The Merchant of Venice and Two Gentlemen of Verona, with Shakespeare himself appearing.

== Recording ==
Barbara Hannigan (Mozart's Despina), Alda Caiello (L'angelo Rafael), Cristina Zavalloni (Mirandolina), Sara Mingardo (Desdemona), Michael Bennett (Arlecchino), Chris Ziegler (Baffo), Roberto Abbondanza (Goldoni) & Michael Leibundgut (Othello) Orchestra and chorus of Teatro La Fenice, Andrea Molino, DVD Dynamic.
