= Delitiæ Musicæ =

Delitiae Musicae is an Italian classical instrumental and vocal ensemble. There is no relation to the Spanish lute duo Delitiae Musicae on the Brilliant label.

== Biography and career ==
Founded in 1992, Delitiae Musicae is an a cappella early music ensemble, performing vocal music from the Renaissance and Baroque periods. Led by Marco Longhini, the ensemble, based in Verona, Italy, has performed in many European classical music festivals, and has recorded a number of CDs for the Naxos label. In addition to recording the complete madrigals of Monteverdi (all 9 books), Delitiae Musicae completed the recording of the six books of madrigals of Gesualdo in 2013, and has made other recordings of works by Palestrina and Banchieri.

== Discography ==
- Adriano Banchieri: Il Studio Dilettevole, CD
- Adriano Banchieri: La Pazzia Senile, CD (Stradivarius, 2016)
- Monteverdi: Madrigals Books 1 to 9
- Gesualdo: Madrigals Books 1 to 6
