= Fausto Romitelli =

Italian composer

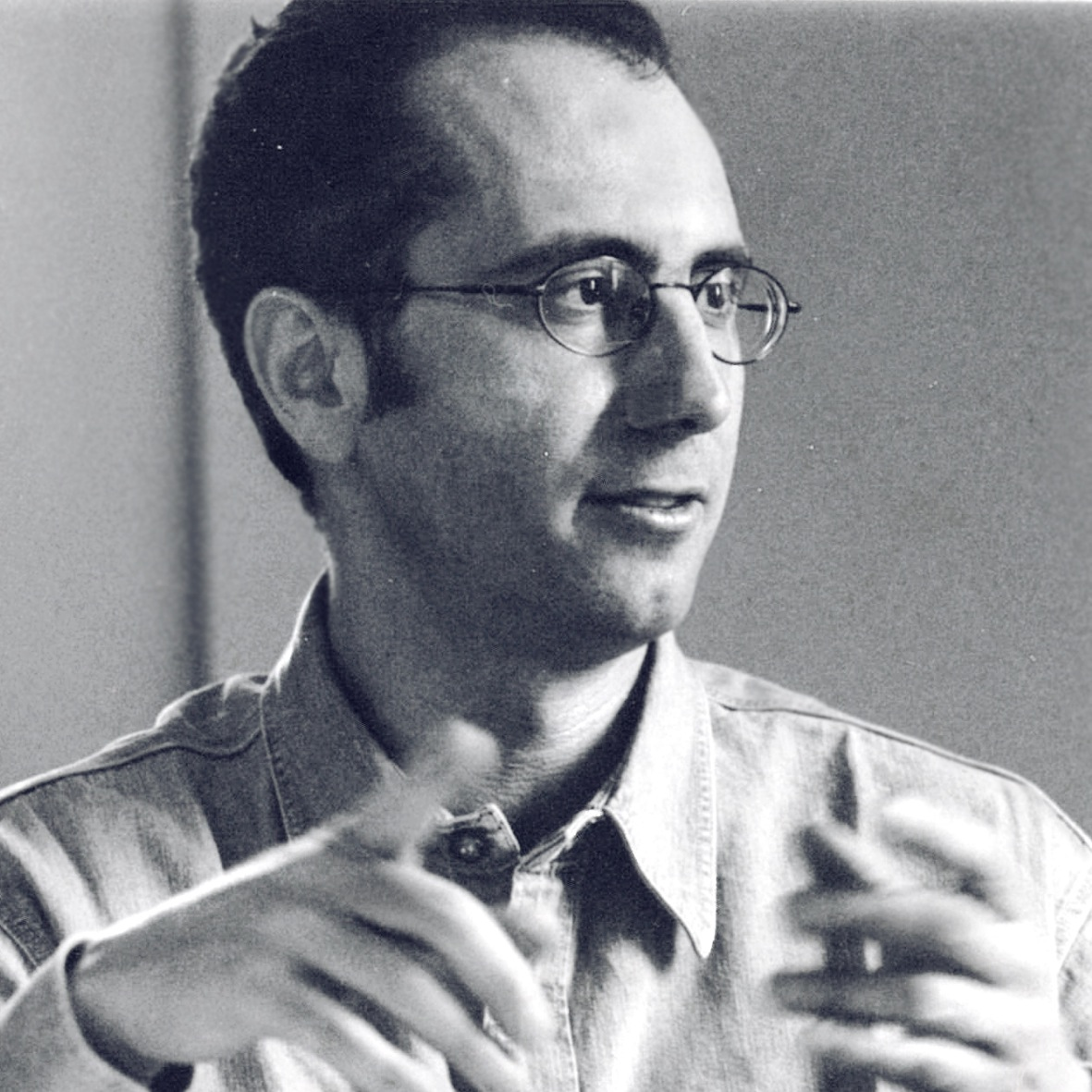
Fausto Romitelli (2000)

Fausto Romitelli (1 February 1963 – 27 June 2004) was an Italian composer.

== Life and career ==
Romitelli was born on 1 February 1963 in Gorizia, Italy. He studied composition at the Milan Conservatory and subsequently took part in courses at the Accademia Musicale Chigiana in Siena with Franco Donatoni and at the Scuola Civica di Milano. In 1991, he moved to Paris, where he became a student of Hugues Dufourt and Gérard Grisey. From 1993 to 1995, he was compositeur en recherche at IRCAM.

Romitelli achieved successes in numerous European competitions, and his music has been performed by ensembles such as Berg Orchestra and at festivals such as the Festival d'automne Paris, Musica nova Helsinki, Steirischer Herbst (Graz), the Venice Biennale, and the Darmstädter Ferienkurse. His video opera An Index of Metals (2003) was awarded the Franco Abbiati Prize by the National Association of Music Critics in Italy in 2004.

He died aged 41 in Milan on 27 June 2004, following a long battle with cancer.

== Works ==
=== 1980s ===
- Suite for chamber ensemble, 1982 (unpublished)
- Dia Nykta for solo flute, 1982
- Versilia for soprano and orchestra, 1983 (unpublished)
- Lustralis for wind quintet, 1983 (unpublished)
- Solare for solo guitar, 1983
- Dimensioni for 16 performers, 1984 (unpublished)
- Highway to Hell for solo guitar, 1984
- Furit aestus for soprano and instrumental quintet, 1985
- Invita la sua ninfa all'ombra for soprano and cello, 1986 (text by Giovan Battista Marino)
- Ganimede for solo viola, 1986
- Ariel song for voice and guitar, 1987 (unpublished)
- Pallide sabbie for orchestra, 1987 (unpublished)
- Coralli for solo guitar, 1987
- Simmetria d'oggetti for recorder and guitar, 1987–88
- Have your trip for harp, guitar and mandolin, 1988–89
- Kû for 14 performers, 1989
- Meridiana for orchestra, 1989–90

=== 1990s ===
- Spazio – Articolazione for 32 performers and amplification systems, 1990
- Nell'alto dei giorni immobili for 6 performers, 1990
- Natura morta con fiamme for string quartet and electronics, 1991
- La Lune et les eaux for 2 guitars, 1991
- La sabbia del tempo for 6 performers, 1991
- Mediterraneo – I. Les idoles du soleil for ensemble, 1992
- Mediterraneo – II. L'azur des déserts for voice and 14 instruments, 1992–93
- Your time is over for cello and ensemble, 1993
- Golfi d'ombra for solo percussion, 1993
- Acid Dreams and Spanish Queens for ensemble, 1994
- Seascape for contrabass recorder, 1994
- EnTrance for soprano, ensemble and electronics, 1995
- Domeniche alla periferia dell'impero. Prima domenica for 4 instruments, 1995–96
- Cupio Dissolvi for 14 performers, 1996
- The Nameless City for strings and bells ad libitum, 1997
- Lost for voice and 15 instruments, 1997
- Music for László Moholy-Nagy's film Ein Lichtspiel, schwarz-weiss-grau for recorder, double bass, guitar, percussion and piano, 1997
- Professor Bad Trip: Lesson I for 8 performers and electronics, 1998
- Professor Bad Trip: Lesson II for ensemble, 1998–99
- The Poppy in the Cloud for choir and ensemble, 1999

=== 2000s ===
- Professor Bad Trip: Lesson III for ensemble, 2000
- Blood on the Floor, Painting 1986 for ensemble, 2000
- Domeniche alla periferia dell'impero. Seconda domenica: hommage à Gérard Grisey for 4 instruments, 2000
- Flowing down too slow for string orchestra, percussion and bells, 2001
- Amok Koma for ensemble and electronics, 2001
- Chorus for percussionists, 2001
- Trash TV Trance for electric guitar, 2002
- An Index of Metals, video opera for soprano, ensemble, multiple projections and electronics (text: Kenka Lekovich, video: Paolo Pachini, Leonardo Romoli), 2003
- Dead City Radio Audiodrome for orchestra, 2003
- Green, Yellow and Blue for ensemble, 2003

== Discography ==
- Fausto Romitelli, Cupio dissolvi, Ensemble Phoenix Basel, MGB, 2008, (with works by Jim Grimm, Beat Furrer, Jorge Sánchez-Chiong and Alex Buess), MGB 110.
- —, Audiodrome [orchestral works]: Dead City Radio. Audiodrome; EnTrance; Flowing Down Too Slow; The Nameless City, Orchestra Sinfonica Nazionale della RAI with Peter Rundel, Stradivarius, 2005, STR33723.
- —, Paolo Pachini, An Index of Metals, Ictus Ensemble with Georges-Elie Octors (conductor) and Donatienne Michel-Dansac (soprano), Cyprès, 2003.
- —, Professor Bad Trip, Ictus Ensemble, Cyprès, 2003.
- —, Trash TV Trance, Giacomo Baldelli, La Bottega Discantica, 2010, BDI231.
- —, The Nameless City, Musiques Nouvelles, Jean-Paul Dessy, Cyprès, 2012.
- —, Anamorphosis, Talea Ensemble, Tzadik, 2012.
- —, Nell'alto dei giorni immobili and remixes, Zagros. Remixes by Diego Capoccitti, Neil Kaczor, Andrea Mancianti and WK569, altremusiche.it / Sincronie, 2012, am002.
- —, Solare, Elena Casoli, Virginia Arancio, and Teresa Hackel, Stradivarius, 2019, STR37099.

== Bibliography ==
- Alessandro Arbo, « Fausto Romitelli : six keywords », in On the Page (Universal Music Publishing Classical), 2014, p. 42-45
- Alessandro Arbo, « Psychedelic Rock and the Music of Fausto Romitelli », in Amy Bauer, Liam Cagney, and William Mason (eds), The Oxford Handbook of Spectral Music, Oxford University Press (2022), online edn, Oxford Academic, 8 Dec. 2021, https://doi.org/10.1093/oxfordhb/9780190633547.013.32

== Sources ==
- "Fausto Romitelli" (biography, works, resources) (in French and English). IRCAM.
- Fausto Romitelli, Société de musique contemporaine du Québec (SMCQ)
