= Vittorio Parisi =

Italian conductor and teacher (born 1957)

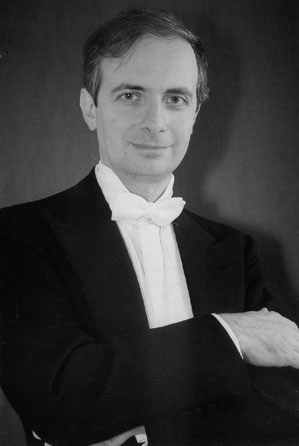
- Born: 6 April 1957 (age 69); Milan, Italy
- Education: Milan Conservatory
- Occupations: Conductor; Academic tacher
- Organizations: Milan Conservatory

Vittorio Parisi (born 6 April 1957) is an Italian conductor and teacher.

== Biography ==
Parisi was born in Milan and studied at the Milan Conservatory—piano with Carla Giudici and Piero Rattalino, composition with Azio Corghi and Irlando Danieli, and conducting with Mario Gusella and Gianluigi Gelmetti. He was also Gianluigi Gelmetti's assistant for several years and attended a masterclass in the Netherlands with the Russian conductor Kirill Kondrashin. Following his debut at the Teatro Petruzzelli in Bari in 1979, went on to an international career conducting both operas and orchestral concerts in major concert halls and opera houses.

He has conducted many premieres by contemporary composers, most importantly his collaborations Luciano Berio and John Cage. He has also conducted the first performances in modern times of works such as the American version of L'ape musicale by Lorenzo Da Ponte, the first staged performances of Gian Francesco Malipiero's Il sogno di un tramonto d'autunno, the first revival of Kurt Weill's Marie Galante, and the first live performance of the radio opera Don Perlimplin by Bruno Maderna.

He has served as the Principal Conductor of Angelicum Orchestra in Milan (1984–88), Associate Conductor of the Filarmonica del Conservatorio di Milano (2000–2003) and artistic director and Principal Conductor of I Solisti Aquilani in L'Aquila (2003–2005). In the contemporary music field he has been the artistic director and Principal Conductor of the Dedalo Ensemble in Brescia since 1995.

He has recorded for many labels, including Naxos, Dynamic, Bongiovanni, La Nuova Era, and Stradivarius. His performance of the New World Symphony by Dvorak with the Auckland Philharmonia was chosen as New Zealand Radio's first classical podcast.

Parisi is Head of conducting department at the Milan Conservatory where he has taught conducting since 1997. Vittorio Parisi lives in Brescia, Italy.

== Discography ==
- L. DA PONTE: L'Ape musicale. Nuova Era
- WAGENSEIL-KRUMPHOLTZ-DUSSEK: Harp Concertos. Naxos
- I. CAPITANIO: Pasqua Fiorentina. Bongiovanni
- C. TOGNI: Barrabas - F.MARGOLA: Il mito di Caino. Bongiovanni
- S. MERCADANTE: Flute concertos. Dynamic
- F. MARGOLA: Kinderkonzert nr 1 & 2, Trittico per archi, Notturno e Fuga per archi. Bongiovanni
- G. CRESTA, A. GENTILUCCI, F. VACCHI, M. CESA: Rotte Sonore. Stradivarius
