= Vincent Beer-Demander =

French composer

- Born: 1982 (age 43–44); Paris, France
- Occupations: Mandolinist; composer
- Organizations: Mandol'in Ariège

Vincent Beer-Demander, born in Paris in 1982, is a French mandolinist and composer. He teaches at several music schools and numerous musical events, in France and abroad, in particular the Mandol'in Ariège festival, of which he was one of the main creators and organizers. His compositions are available from several music publishers.

== Biography ==
=== Formation ===
Born in Paris, Beer-Demander began his musical education in 1990 at the Toulouse Mandolin School, which had just been created by Francis Morello, one of the oldest musicians of the Toulouse Plectrum Ensemble. In 2000, he continued this formation at the national music school of Argenteuil where he benefited from the experience of Florentino Calvo. There he obtained a diploma in musical studies and a state diploma in ancient instruments which were crowned with a first prize in chamber music and musical training as well as a first prize in mandolin.

Beer-Demander then worked for a year with Ugo Orlandi, at the Music Conservatory of Padua. Then he prepared a chamber music concert license at the École normale de musique de Paris, in the class of Alberto Ponce and as part of the Duo Chitarronne. He obtained it with the unanimous congratulations of the jury. At the same time, he perfected composition at the Marseille Conservatory, with Régis Campo, where he also obtained a first composition prize with unanimous congratulations from the jury, in 2010.

=== Professor ===
Beer-Demander teaches at the Marseille Conservatory and at the Royal Conservatory of Liège. He teaches at the Academy of Mandolins in Marseille where he is also the artistic director since its creation in 2007.

He also works at the music school of Vif where he also provides musical direction for the Corda'Vif plectrum orchestra and at the Estudiantina d'Annecy where he notably supervises the annual choro course.

In 2010, Beer-Demander participated with Raffaele Calace Jr, Artemisio Gavioli, Sebastiaan De Grebber and Mauro Squillante in the jury of the 7th Calace International Competition for mandolin.

In 2010 and 2011, Beer-Demander was part of the teaching team of the Stages de Chaillol in Saint-Michel-de-Chaillol in the Hautes-Alpes.

=== Concert performer ===
The number of experts and virtuosos who have the knowledge and skills to meet the demands of an orchestra that plans to perform works that contain parts written for the mandolin includes, in France, about ten people. In order to meet this demand, Beer-Demander participates in around a hundred concerts each year. This activity allows him to collaborate, exchange and put his talent at the disposal of orchestras such as the National Orchestra of France, the National Orchestra of the Capitole of Toulouse, the Bastille Opera and the Nice Philharmonic Orchestra.

Since 1997, he and Gregory Morello have formed the Duo Chitarrone, performing with orchestras or groups of musicians, amateurs and professionals, with the aim of making known the qualities and the many possibilities offered by string or plectrum ensembles.

In 2002, he created, with Gregory Morello and the help of many others, the Mandol'in Ariège festival.

Since 2004, he has been a member of the Nov' Mandolin ensemble (Beer-Demander - mandolin, mandola and mandocello, Fabio Gallucci - mandolin and mandola, Gregory Morello - guitar, Marilyn Montalbano - guitar and acoustic bass guitar, Cécile Valette - mandolin); the group has given numerous concerts with Mike Marshall (in particular in 2006, at the Mandolines Festival in Lunel), and has brought to the stage or recorded several compositions by Beer-Demander.

In 2005, Beer-Demander participated, with Karin ten Cate, Robert Eek, Grégory Morello, André Perpigna, Jean-Paul Sire, and Florence Vételet, as part of the Opéra Mosset event, in the eight convivial performances "Tapas y canto" which attract more than 4,000 spectators.

Since 2007, he has directed, with Alexandre Boulanger, the Plectrum Orchestra of the Academy of Mandolins and the Conservatory of Marseille.

Together with Gregory Morello (classical guitar) and Nelson Gomez (guitarrón), he forms the Guitarson Trio.

He also forms with Miren Adouani the duo Pensiero, an original combination of piano and mandolin. This duo is laureate of the international competition Rafaele Calace (Italy, 2008) in the mandolin-piano formation. Their first record was greeted and prefaced by François-René Duchâble.

=== Composer ===
A multifaceted composer, dedicatee of many current composers such as F. Martin, F. Rossé, T. Ogawa, A. Ourkousounov, J.Y. Bosseur, D. Nicolau, he nevertheless remains attached to the original repertoire of the 18th, 19th and 20th centuries.

== Awards ==
In 2004, he won the 2nd prize of the Concorso Internazionale Mandolinistico G. Sartori organized by the Italian Federation of the Mandolin (the Federazione Mandolinistica Italiana).

In 2005, he received, unanimously by the jury, the 3rd prize in the UFAM competition, in the ensemble music duo category.

In 2008, he won the International Calace Competition (Italy) for the Duo Pensiero.

In 2009, he won the International Composition Competition in Logrono (Spain).

In 2010, he received the 1st Prize for Composition unanimously and congratulations from the jury of the CNRR in Marseille.
