= Dynamis Ensemble =

- Origin: Milan, Italy
- Genres: Contemporary classical, Contemporary music
- Occupation: Chamber ensemble
- Years active: 1999–present
- Labels: Stradivarius recordings
- Members: Birgit Nolte, flutes Rocco Parisi, clarinet and bass clarinet Paolo Casiraghi, clarinet and bass clarinet Fabio Fabbri, trumpet Dominique Chiarappa, violin & viola Daniela Cammarano, violin Alessio Tedeschi, cello Sergio Armaroli, percussion Candida Felici, piano and harpsichord
- Website: www.dynamisensemble.it

The Dynamis Ensemble originated in 1999 in Milan, Italy, from a group of musicians already active within the framework of international concerts, joined by an intense passion for the knowledge and diffusion of contemporary music and 20th-century composers.

Since then, the group has established in Italian contemporary music circles regarding their performance, precision and technical skills, frequently combining the music of young composers with the works of the masters. In addition, the Dynamis Ensemble has performed in numerous concerts at important cultural centres, both in Italy and abroad, such as Festival Milano Musica, Aspekte Salzburg, Mostra Sonora Sueca (Spain), Festival Internacional Cervantino (Mexico), International Forum of Cultures UNESCO Monterrey (Mexico), and Forum Neue Musik Luzern.

The ensemble often performs world premieres of musical works, including the interaction of electro-acoustics and multimedia in their performances. The Dynamis Ensemble collaborates with composers such as Jonathan Harvey, Alessandro Solbiati, and Javier Torres Maldonado.

== Discography ==
- Stradivarius (STR 33718) Javier Torres Maldonado: Tiento, for cello and electronics, 2004, Edizioni Suvini Zerboni, Milano.
- Stradivarius (STR 33719) Javier Torres Maldonado: The unexpected clock in the mirrors, for violin, bass-clarinet and ensemble. Carlo Chiarappa, violin, Rocco Parisi, bass-clarinet, Javier Torres Maldonado, conductor, 2005, Edizioni Nuova Stradivarius, Milano.
- Stradivarius (STR 33723) Javier Torres Maldonado: Orior, for fortepiano, 2005, Universal Edition.
- Stradivarius (STR 33719) Javier Torres Maldonado: De ignoto cantu, for ensemble and electronics. Javier Torres Maldonado, conductor, 2005, Edizioni Suvini Zerboni, Milano.
