= Luca Mosca =

Italian composer and pianist

Luca Mosca (born Milan, 29 May 1957) is an Italian composer. He is best known for his 2007 opera Signor Goldoni.
