= Dynamis (journal) =

- Discipline: History of medicine
- Language: English, Spanish
- Edited by: Mikel Astrain, Annette Mülberger

Publication details
- History: 1981–present
- Publisher: University of Granada, Autonomous University of Barcelona, Miguel Hernández University of Elche, University of Cantabria (Spain)
- Frequency: Biannually
- Open access: Delayed
- License: CC BY
- Impact factor: 0.545 (2021)

Standard abbreviations
- ISO 4: Dynamis

Indexing
- ISSN: 0211-9536 (print); 2340-7948 (web)
- OCLC no.: 642384753

Links
- Journal homepage; Online access; Online archive

Dynamis is a biannual peer-reviewed academic journal covering the history of medicine and science. It publishes articles, notes, documents, and reviews in Spanish and English (with some articles in French, Italian, or Portuguese). Contents are freely accessible online six months after publication from Revistes Catalanes amb Accés Obert and SciELO.

== History ==
The journal was established in 1981 at the University of Granada by five historians of medicine (Luis García Ballester, Teresa Ortiz, Rosa María Moreno, Guillermo Olagüe and Esteban Rodríguez Ocaña). The first editorial note acknowledged the influence of Pedro Laín Entralgo, and justified the publication of the new journal by referring to the recent growing interest in the history of science, in particular the history of medicine, in Spain. From the beginning, the aim of the journal was to contribute to a comprehension of the practical and social aspects of medicine from a broad perspective including the history of scientific, educational, and medical institutions.

== Abstracting and indexing ==
The journal is abstracted and indexed in:

- Arts and Humanities Citation Index
- FRANCIS
- Historical Abstracts
- ISIS: Critical Bibliography
- ERIH PLUS (European Reference Index for the Humanities)
- L'Année Philologique
- Latindex
- Science Citation Index Expanded
- Scopus
- Social Sciences Citation Index
- IBECS (Índice Bibliográfico Español en Ciencias de la Salud)

According to the Journal Citation Reports, the journal has a 2014 impact factor of 0.306.
