= Teatro Carlo Goldoni =

Teatro Carlo Goldoni or Teatro Goldoni can refer to a number of theaters or opera houses in Italy, dedicated to Carlo Goldoni:

- Teatro Goldoni (Bagnacavallo), Province of Ravenna, Italy
- Teatro Goldoni (Corinaldo), Province of Ancona, Italy
- Teatro Goldoni (Florence), Region of Tuscany, Italy
- Teatro Goldoni (Livorno), Region of Tuscany, Italy
- Teatro Goldoni (Venice), Region of Veneto, Italy
