= Giorgio Goldoni =

Italian volleyball player (born 1954)

Personal information
- Nationality: Italian
- Born: 19 November 1954 (age 70); Modena, Italy

Sport
- Sport: Volleyball

Giorgio Goldoni (born 19 November 1954) is an Italian volleyball player. He competed in the men's tournament at the 1976 Summer Olympics.
