= Alessandro Solbiati =

Italian composer of classical music (born 1956)

- Born: 9 September 1956 (age 70); Busto Arsizio, Italy
- Education: Milan Conservatory
- Occupations: Composer; Academic
- Organisations: Conservatorio Giovanni Battista Martini; Milan Conservatory

Alessandro Solbiati (born 9 September 1956) is an Italian composer of classical music, who has composed instrumental music for chamber ensembles and orchestra, art songs and operas. He received international commissions and awards, and many of his works are recorded. He is also an academic, teaching in Italy and France.

== Career ==
Born on 9 September 1956 in Busto Arsizio, Solbiati originally pursued training as a physicist and did not begin to pursue regular music lessons until 1975. He did not abandon his physics studies until being persuaded to pursue a music career by the composer Franco Donatoni in 1977. From 1977 to 1980 he was a student concurrently at the Accademia Musicale Chigiana (AMC) in Siena and the Milan Conservatory (MC). At the MC he studied full time with an emphasis in piano with Eli Perrota, and composition with Sandro Gorli; graduating with two diplomas from the MC in piano (1981) and music composition (1982). At the AMC he was a part time composition student of Donatoni, but never earned a degree from that school.

From 1982 to 1995 Solbiati was a professor of music composition and fugue at the Bologna Conservatory. In 1995 he joined the faculty of the Milan Conservatory. He later taught on the staff of the Centre Acanthes in Avignon. He has held master classes at the Conservatoire de Paris and the Conservatoire de Lyon.

Solbiati received commissions from La Scala, the RAI, Radio France, Mozarteum, Gulbenkian Foundation and Southbank Centre, among others. His music has been performed at notable festivals, in Australia, Austria, Croatia, France, Germany, Greece, Japan, Netherlands, Portugal, Russia, Spain, Sweden, Switzerland, the UK and the US, and other. His music has been broadcast in Europe and America. It was published by "Edizioni Suvini Zerboni" in Milan.

He set poems by Baudelaire, Rainer Maria Rilke and Friedrich Hölderlin to music, among others. Two operas are based on works by Russian authors, Il carro e i canti (2008) after Alexander Pushkin, and Leggenda after Dostoyevsky's The Brothers Karamazov. It was commissioned by the Teatro Regio di Torino and premiered in 2011, conducted by Gianandrea Noseda. His third opera, Il suono giallo, is based on Wassily Kandinsky's experimental play The Yellow Sound. It was premiered on 13 June 2015 at the Teatro Comunale di Bologna.

His compositions achieved awards at international competitions, such as a string quartet at the International Milan Competition in 1980, and a violin concerto, Di Luce, winning the RAI-Paganini Prize of Rome in 1982.

== Compositions ==
His list of compositions is published by IRCAM:

- ibi bonae fabbricator for flute
- Quartetto for string quartet (1980)
- Des ciels brouillés for oboe and ensemble (1981)
- Blütenstaub for violin, viola and piano (1982)
- Di luce for violin and orchestra (1982)
- Cadeau for piano, violin, cello and five percussionist (1984)
- Lied for soprano, violin, cello and piano (1985)
- Nel deserto oratorio for soloists, choir and instruments (1986)
- Dawn for flute and harp (1987)
- Trio for violin, cello and piano (1987)
- Notturno for wind quintet (1988)
- As if to land for flute (1989)
- Am Fuss des Gebirgs for flute, bass clarinet and piano (1991)
- Corde for viola (1991)
- Secondo quartetto for string quartet (1991)
- Decima elegia for soloists, choir and orchestra (1991/95)
- Canto per Ania for cello and 14 instruments (1992)
- Ottetto for wind instruments (1992)
- By my window for piano and ensemble (1993)
- Mi lirica sombra for bass clarinet and ensemble (1993)
- Con l'antico canto for flute and bass clarinet (1995)
- Inno, radio opera (1996)
- La colomba azzurra / racconto in musica su testo di Paola Capriolo (1996)
- Mari for flute, clarinet, violin, cello and piano (1997)
- Sonetto for violin and piano (1997)
- Sinfonia for orchestra (1997/98)
- Piccoli canti / per voce recitante e otto strumenti su testi di Alda Merini (1998)
- Ingresso e Kyrie for choir and instruments (1999)
- Sette pezzi for string orchestra (1999)
- Concerto for guitar and orchestra (2000)
- Der Wind spielt for wind instruments (2002)
- Memoriam for orchestra (2002)
- Piccoli canti Suite for eight instruments (2002)
- Due adagi for violin solo (2003)
- Il risveglio di Florestano for chamber orchestra (2003)
- Pensieri interrotti for bayan (2003)
- Weg for twelve instruments (2004)
- Sonata seconda for piano (2005)
- Alumina for flute and strings (2005)
- Volo for soprano and viola (2005)
- Dies for clarinet and piano (2005)
- Sonata Felix for piano and violin (2006)
- Tre lieder su George for soprano and piano on poems by Stefan George (2006)
- Und nun for baritone and seven instrumenti. Homage to Joseph Haydn on a stanza by Rainer Maria Rilke (2009)
- Thai song for 52 gongs from Thailand (2009)
- Il carro e i canti, opera in one act, after Pushkin (2009)
- Leggenda, opera in one act, libretto by the composer (2011)
- Il suono giallo, opera (2017)

== Recordings ==
- Nel Deserto, ensemble 2E2M (CD ADDA)
- Quartetto con lied, Borciani string quartet (Stradivarius,)
- Trio, trio Matisse (Ermitage)
- Tre pezzi per chitarra, Filomena Moretti (Phoenix)
- Alessandro Solbiati ensemble Alternance (Stradivarius)
- Solbiati & Botter: Agli inquieti spiriti (Stradivarius)
- By my Window (Stradivarius)
- Piano Works (Stradivarius)
- Crescendo, orchestra (EMA Vinci records)
- Il suono giallo, Opera (EMA Vinci records – EMA Vinci contemporanea)
- Leggenda, Opera (EMA Vinci records – EMA Vinci contemporanea)
- INSIEME, ensemble (EMA Vinci records – EMA Vinci contemporanea)
