= Andrea Molino =

Italian composer and conductor (born 1964)

Andrea Molino (born 1964 in Turin, Italy) is an Italian composer and conductor.

== Biography ==
Andrea Molino was born in Turin and studied in Turin, Milan, Venice, Paris and Freiburg. He lives in Zurich and Paris. In 1997, as musical director of the Pocket Opera Company in Nuremberg he conducted the world premiere of Alessandro Melchiorre's Unreported inbound Palermo and in 2000, the premiere of the stage version of Heiner Goebbels' Surrogate Cities. His own projects the smiling carcass (1999), based on the subject of advertising, and Those Who Speak In A Faint Voice (2001), on death penalty, both in collaboration with the Italian photographer Oliviero Toscani, are the first examples of his commitment towards innovative, multimedia oriented music theatre.

From 2000 to 2006 Andrea Molino was artistic director of Fabrica Musica, the music department of the Italian communication research center, Fabrica. CREDO, a multimedia music theatre on the theme of ethnic and religious conflicts was premiered in April 2004 at the Badisches Staatstheater Karlsruhe and then performed at the Stazione Termini in Rome with the Orchestra del Maggio Musicale Fiorentino, on the occasion of the World Summit of Nobel Peace Laureates; in July 2005 it opened the Queensland Music Festival in Brisbane, Australia. WINNERS has been premiered, conducted on 22 July 2006 at the Brisbane Festival; the European premiere took place in October 2006 in Paris at the Grande Salle of the Centre Pompidou.

The multimedia staged concert "un Temps vécu, ou qui pourrait l’être" had its world premiere on 6 June 2008 at Le Fresnoy – Studio National des Arts Contemporains, in Lille, where Molino was “Invited Artist” for the season 2007–2008.

In October 2009, as artistic director of the World Venice Forum, he curated the Festival The Garden Of Forking Paths. In the closing concert at the Basilica dei Frari he conducted the Orchestra del Teatro La Fenice in his own multimedia concert Of Flowers And Flames, for the 25th anniversary of the Bhopal disaster, in India. Three Mile Island, on the nuclear accident in Pennsylvania in 1979, was first performed in March 2012 at the ZKM Center for Art and Media Karlsruhe with the Neue Vocalsolisten Stuttgart and the Klangforum Wien; the Italian Premiere followed at the Teatro India in Rome. The project received the Music Theatre Now Award 2012.

His opera - there is no why here -, was premiered at the Teatro Comunale di Bologna in April 2014 and revived in May 2015 in Antwerp at deSingel for the Flemish Opera (Opera XXI Festival).

I want the things, written for David Moss, has been shown in 2020 by the Abbey Theatre in Dublin as a part of their Dear Ireland project. In November 2021 The Garden of Forking Paths was premiered at Palazzo Madama in Turin; the project has been the first public implementation of the SWARMS platform, developed with the Centro di Ricerche RAI in Turin. The music video installation The sense of the place - Montepulciano accompanied the 2022 edition of the Cantiere Internazionale d'Arte in Montepulciano.

La vérité, pas toute, for 32 voices, 8 percussions, electronics and video was premiered in July 2023 at the Chigiana International Festival in Siena.

Recent projects as a conductor include the premiere of Mikael Karlsson (composer)'s Melancholia at the Royal Swedish Opera in Stockholm, the opening of the Chigiana International Festival in Siena with Luciano Berio's Coro and Voci, the New York Stories project with the Sydney Symphony Orchestra, Alban Berg's Wozzeck directed by William Kentridge and Shostakovich's The Nose, directed by Barrie Kosky at the Sydney Opera House for Opera Australia; the world premiere of Cathy Marston's The Cellist at the Royal Opera House in London.

For Opera Australia he had previously conducted Kròl Roger (directed by Kasper Holten, Green Room Award 2018), Carmen, Tosca and La Bohème (2015 NYE Gala at the Sydney Opera House), A Masked Ball (directed by Alex Ollé - La Fura dels Baus) and Macbeth among others. He opened the 2010 concert season of the Teatro La Fenice in Venice with the world premiere of Bruno Maderna's Requiem (CD Stradivarius, Abbiati Award 2022). At the Teatro La Fenice he had opened the 2005 edition of the Venice Music Biennale with Heiner Goebbels’ Surrogate Cities and he conducted the world premiere productions of Mosca's Signor Goldoni (2007) and Ambrosini's Il Killer di Parole (2010).

He conducted the Orchestra del Maggio Musicale Fiorentino, the Brussels Philharmonic, the Bochumer Symphoniker, the Badische Staatskapelle Karlsruhe, the Sydney Symphony Orchestra, the Melbourne Symphony Orchestra, the Queensland Symphony Orchestra, the BBC Scottish Symphony Orchestra, the Royal Swedish Orchestra, the Malmoe Opera Orchestra, the Orchestre national du Capitole de Toulouse, the Orchestre National de Lyon at the Edinburgh Festival, Wiener Konzerthaus, Berliner Festspiele / März Musik in the Berliner Philharmonie, Sydney Festival, Queensland Music Festival, Brisbane Festival, Beijing Opera House, Tchaikovsky Concert Hall in Moscow, Copenhagen Opera Festival, Teatro Comunale in Bologna, Teatro Comunale in Bologna, Teatro dell'Opera in Rome, Opéra national de Nancy, Staatstheater Darmstadt, RomaEuropa Festival among others.

His compositions are published by RAI COM (Rome), Nuova Stradivarius (Milan) and Ricordi (Milan). He has been recording with Naive (Paris), ECM (Munich), Stradivarius (Milan) and ABC Classics (Sydney) among others.

== Selected works ==
- La vérité, pas toute (2023), for 32 voices, 8 percussionists, 16 mobile video cameras and live electronics
- Il senso del luogo - Montepulciano (2022), music video installation
- The Garden of Forking Paths (2021), a multimedia music action for four itinerant speakers, itinerant saxophone quartet and instrumental ensemble in live audiovisual connection
- Chants de fragilité (2021) for solo violin, video, 16 violinists and orchestra
- A System of Reality (- the looting starts, the shooting starts -) (2020) for solo Viola
- I want the things (2020), music video for solo voice with percussion (for David Moss)
- The Sense of the Place - Dublin (2019), music video series for solo bass clarinet in multiple locations
- Swarm (2019) for solo electric guitar and ensemble of 16 electric guitars
- - there is no why here - (2014), multimedia music theatre for vocal and instrumental soloists, performers, large orchestra, live electronics and live video
- Three Mile Island (2012), multimedia staged concert for vocal ensemble, instrumental ensemble, live electronics and live video.
- Open, Air (2012), for voices, instruments and orchestra in open space.
- Of Flowers And Flames (2009), multimedia concert for solo Sarangi (video), symphony orchestra and live video for the 25th anniversary of the Bhopal disaster, in India.
- un Temps vécu, ou qui pourrait l'être (2007–2008), multimedia staged concert for vocalist, basset horn, percussion, actress, live electronics and live video
- WINNERS (2005–06), multimedia music action for 2 saxophones, 7 solo percussionists, symphony orchestra, live electronics and live video
- CREDO (2003–04), multimedia music theatre for vocal and instrumental soloists, actors, large orchestra, live electronics, live video and live satellite connections
- Drops On A Hot Stone (2001) for instrumental ensemble, live electronics and live video
- Those Who Speak In A Faint Voice (2000–2001) for solo vocalist, solo saxophone, instrumental ensemble, live electronics and live video
- Voices (2000) for solo vocalist, instrumental ensemble, live electronics and live video
- The Smiling Carcass (1998–99) solo vocalist, 2 actors, madrigal ensemble, solo saxophone, ensemble and live electronics
- Earth and Heart Dances (1997) for 5 percussionists and live electronics
- Gesti per un tempo di passione (1996) for 14 instruments

== Selected CDs and DVDs ==
- Bruno Maderna: Requiem (Carmela Remigio, Soprano; Veronica Simeoni, Mezzosoprano; Mario Zeffiri, Tenor; Simone Alberghini, Bass; Coro e Orchestra del Teatro La Fenice, conductor: Andrea Molino; Stradivarius STR37180, 2022)
- Various Composers: Agony and Ecstasy (Emma Matthews, Soprano; Melbourne Symphony Orchestra, conductor: Andrea Molino; ABC Classics, 2016)
- Various Composers: The Kiss (Nicole Car, Soprano; Opera Australia Orchestra, conductor: Andrea Molino; ABC Classics, 2015)
- Marc Sinan: Hasretim (DVD of the world premiere, Dresdner Sinfoniker, conductor: Andrea Molino; ECM, Munich, 2013)
- Andrea Molino: CREDO (DVD of the world premiere, conductor: Andrea Molino; Naive, Paris, 2006)
- Luca Mosca: Signor Goldoni (DVD of the world premiere at the Teatro La Fenice in Venice; DVD Dynamic 33600, 2008)
- Andrea Molino: The Smiling Carcass (live recording of the production of the Pocket Opera Company in collaboration with Bayerischer Rundfunk, conductor: Andrea Molino; CD Stradivarius STR 33558, 1999)
- Bruno Maderna: Serenata n.2, Concerto per 2 pianoforti (A. Orvieto, M. Rapetti, Pf.; Ex Novo Ensemble, Venice; Demoé Percussion Ensemble, Aosta, conductor: Andrea Molino; CD Stradivarius STR 33536, 1999)
- Andrea Molino: Earth and Heart Dances (Demoé Percussion Ensemble, Aosta; CD Stradivarius STR 33499, 1998)
