= Suvini Zerboni =

Suvini Zerboni (ESZ) Italian music publishing house founded in 1907 in Milan, taking its name from the theater society of the same name. The ESZ catalogue included, besides operetta favourites, the best of Italian contemporary music, such composers as Goffredo Petrassi, Luigi Dallapiccola, Luciano Berio, Ildebrando Pizzetti, and Gian Francesco Malipiero. Since the 1950s, ESZ has been the Italian agent of Schott Music, representing composers such as Igor Stravinsky, Carl Orff, Paul Hindemith, Richard Strauss, Luigi Nono, Krzysztof Penderecki, Joaquín Rodrigo and Alessandro Solbiati. The ESZ catalogue of modern Italian composers active since the 1970s is extensive. ESZ also publishes the bulletin "ESZ News" with information on the activities and performances of its composers. Until 1999, ESZ published Il Fronimo, the guitar magazine founded by Ruggero Chiesa in 1972, and La Cartellina, a magazine on choral and pedagogical music, founded by Roberto Goitre in 1977 and subsequently headed by Giovanni Acciai.

The company was acquired by Sugar Music and is now known as SZ Sugar.
