= Emanuele Arciuli =

Italian classical pianist

Emanuele Arciuli (born in Galatone on 28 June 1965) is an Italian classical pianist.

== Biography ==
He received his diploma from the Conservatory of Bari. After graduation, he continued his piano studies with Vincenzo Vitale, Paolo Bordoni and Leon Fleisher, and attended master classes with Gyorgy Sandor, Michel Dalberto and Maurizio Pollini. He gave numerous recitals in prestigious Italian concert houses such as Teatro San Carlo (Naples), Teatro La Fenice (Venice) and Teatro Carlo Felice (Genoa). He won numerous awards and is regularly invited to festivals throughout Europe and the U.S.

His repertoire comprises Classical Music and the Second Viennese School; his discography includes the complete piano works of Alban Berg and Anton Webern. After his American début 1998 in Cincinnati, Arciuli dedicated much work to a fruitful collaboration with contemporary American composers and musicians. In 2002 he premièred at the Miller Theatre at New York Columbia University Round Midnight Variations, a collection of variations on the famous Thelonious Monk theme, composed for him by major American musicians (Babbitt, Bolcom, Crumb, Daugherty, Harbison, Kernis, Rzewski, Torke and others).

In 2005, his recording of Crumb's Eine kleine Mitternachtmusik was nominated for the Grammy Awards, and in 2006 he won an important Italian critics award for his recording of Rzewski-Adams. In 2008, he premièred with the Indianapolis Symphony Orchestra under the direction of Mario Venzago Louis Ballard's Indiana Concerto, the only piano concerto ever written by a Native American composer, and in 2009, the Concerto for Piano and Orchestra No. 2 by Lorenzo Ferrero, with the orchestra of the Teatro Comunale Florence under Kazushi Ono.

Emanuele Arciuli is currently professor at Bari Music Conservatory.

== Bibliography ==
- Arciuli, Emanuele (2006) Rifugio intermedio - Il pianoforte contemporaneo tra Italia e Stati Uniti. Monfalcone: Teatro Comunale
