= Milan Conservatory =

College of music in Milan, Italy

- Conservatorio di Milano
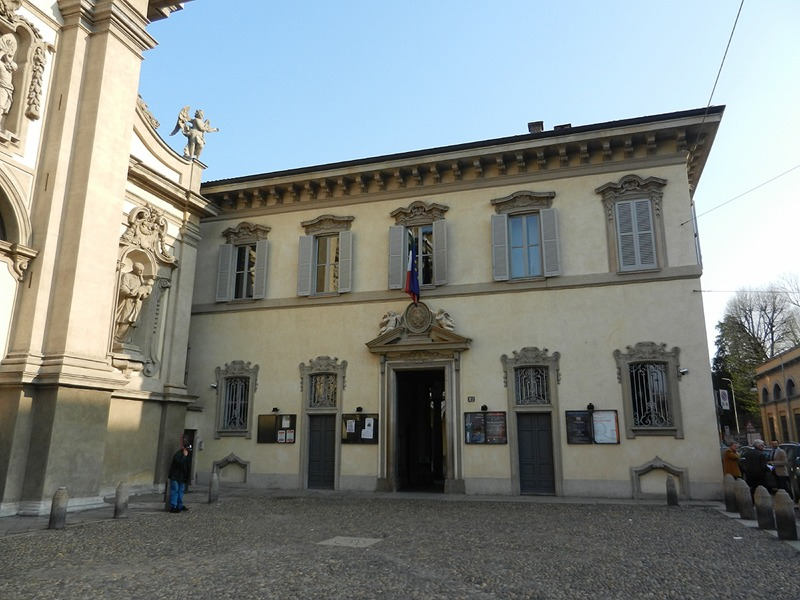

Location
- Via Conservatorio, 12; Milan; Italy; 45°27′54″N 9°12′13″E

Information
- Former name: Conservatorio di Musica "Giuseppe Verdi"
- Type: Music school
- Established: 1807
- Language: Italian
- Website: consmilano.it

The Milan Conservatory, also known as the Conservatorio di Milano and the Conservatorio Giuseppe Verdi, is a college of music in Milan, Italy.

== History ==
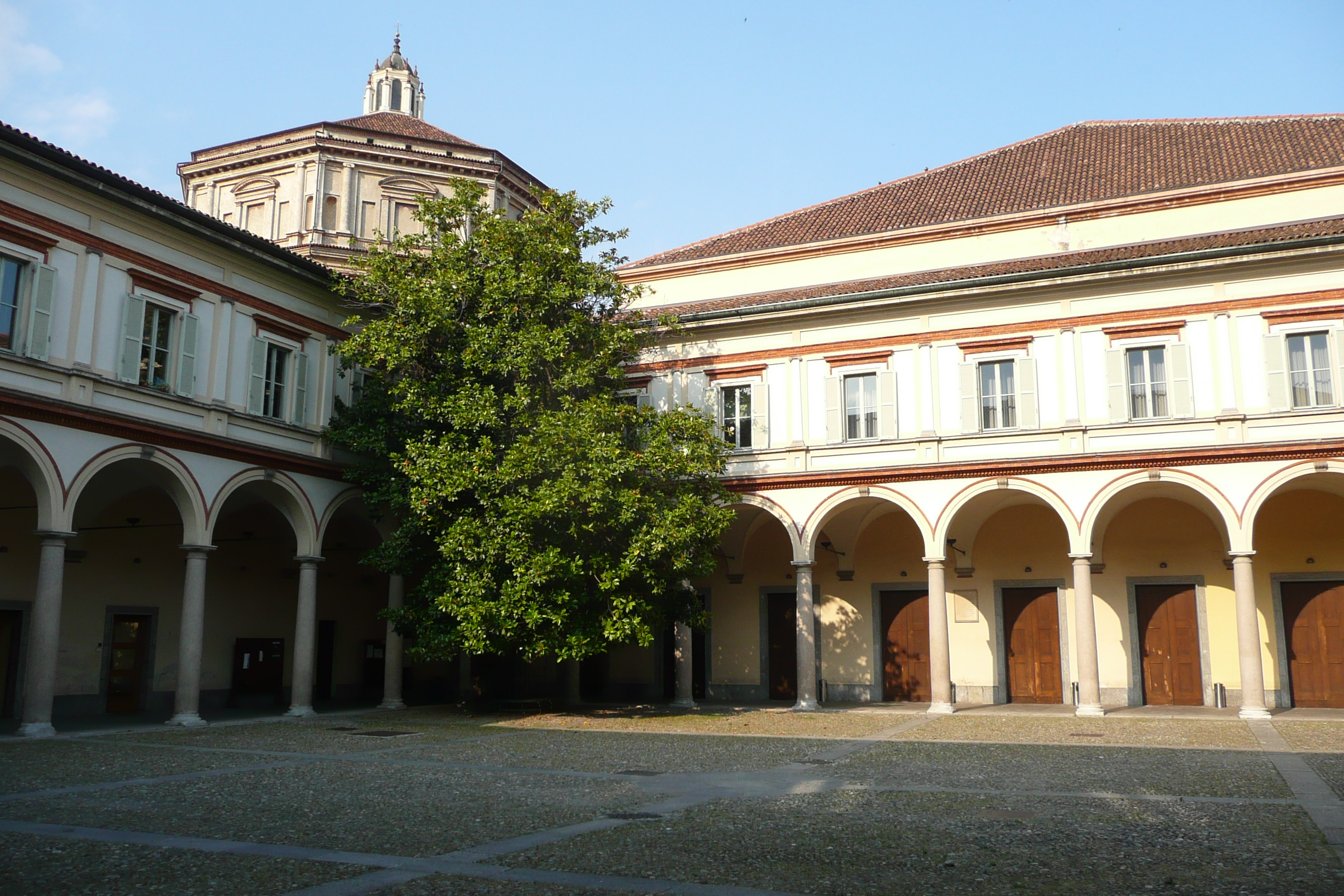
Inner court of the conservatory

The conservatory was established by a royal decree of 1807 in Milan, capital of the Napoleonic Kingdom of Italy. It opened the following year with premises in the cloisters of the Baroque church of Santa Maria della Passione. There were initially eighteen boarders, including students of both sexes. Today it is the largest institute of musical education in Italy.

=== Giuseppe Verdi ===
Giuseppe Verdi, after whom the conservatory is named, in 1832 applied unsuccessfully to study there. Reasons given by the conservatory for rejecting Verdi included that he was over the age limit of 14 years, that he was "a foreigner", that he was "musically inept" because of his "improper" positioning of hands on the piano, and because of his "lack of understanding of the rules of counterpoint". One of the panelists opined that Verdi would "turn out to be a mediocrity". Verdi maintained a lifelong resentment for this, and he kept the rejection letter among his papers. In the decades that followed, the Milan Conservatory would vie for the honour of bearing his name, but Verdi refused, and it was not until the composer's death that the renaming became possible.

== Alumni and faculty ==
In its 200-year history, the conservatory has educated some of Italy's most prominent musicians and conductors, including Fausto Romitelli, Oscar Bianchi, Luca Francesconi, Stefano Gervasoni, Marco Stroppa, Giacomo Puccini, Alfredo Piatti, Amilcare Ponchielli, Arrigo Boito, Giovanni Bottesini, Alfredo Catalani, Riccardo Chailly, Amelita Galli-Curci, Vittorio Giannini, Scipione Guidi, Bruno Maderna, Pietro Mascagni, Gian Carlo Menotti, Francisco Mignone, Riccardo Muti, Kurken Alemshah, Italo Montemezzi, Feliciano Strepponi, Alceo Galliera, Arturo Benedetti Michelangeli, Giuseppe Andaloro, Mario Nascimbene, Maurizio Pollini, Ludovico Einaudi, Antonino Fogliani, Vittorio Parisi, Enrique Mazzola, Gianandrea Noseda, and Claudio Abbado. Other notable students include composers Margrit Zimmermann, Alfredo Antonini, and Alessandro Solbiati, conductor Juan Matteucci, and singers Florin Cezar Ouatu and Paolo Andrea Di Pietro.

Among its past professors are the well-known voice teachers Francesco Lamperti and his son Giovanni Battista Lamperti. Ranking among eminent professors who have taught at the Milan conservatory are Giorgio Battistelli, Franco Donatoni, Lorenzo Ferrero, Riccardo Muti, Enrico Polo, Amilcare Ponchielli, Salvatore Quasimodo, and Alessandro Solbiati.

== High school ==
The conservatory's Liceo Musicale for secondary school students opened in 1971. In 1981, it began an experimental collaboration with the Ministry of Education. The experimental phase ended in 2010 when it became "ad ordinamento".
