= Sandro Gorli =

Italian composer

Sandro Gorli (born 19 June 1948) is an Italian composer, conductor and teacher. He is the author of "Requiem" for mixed choir a Cappella, written specially for the well-known choir La Chapelle Royale. This composition was included in the Treasury of choral authentic music. From 1990 to 1998, he was the principal conductor of the ELISION Ensemble in Melbourne, Australia.

== Early life and education ==
Sandro Gorli was born in Como on 19 June 1948. He entered and graduated from a University course in architecture in Milan, but then switched to studying composition with the renowned Italian composer and teacher Franco Donatoni, which, in particular, was a teacher of modern Finnish composer and conductor Esa-Pekka Salonen. As a result, he received higher education in music – composition class, and piano class.

Sandro Gorli also conducts research in the field of phonology and cooperates with Phonology Studio at the Radiotelevision of Italy (RAI) in Milan. In the process of its work on the RAI he meets with musicians from the RAI National Symphony Orchestra and he liked conduct the orchestra. First Sandro Gorli studying this art directly in Milan, then at the invitation of Hans Swarowsky he moved to Vienna and becomes highly skilled conductor.

Sandro Gorli reveals himself organizational skills in 1977 and establishes still existing "Divertimento" Ensemble. The purpose of this group is the promotion of contemporary music, especially classical music in the style of modernism.

== Performing arts ==
Since 1990 Sandro Gorli has carried out the role of a conductor working tirelessly with two teams – the "Divertimento" ensemble and ELISION Ensemble. Also him accompanies success in work on the invitation. He conducted the "Orchestra Sinfonica Siciliana" in Palermo (premiere "Low Simphony" by Philip Glass), he makes recording music by Bruno Maderna with "Orchestra Sinfonica di Milano Giuseppe Verdi".

To date, Sandro Gorli already recorded more than 14 full-length CDs with music from classical to modernism, in the genre of which he excelled himself.

== Composition ==
Sandro Gorli is among a small number of contemporary composers to have received commissions on such a scale, having being commissioned by Milan's RAI (Radiotelevision Italiana) in 1973, the French Ministry of Culture 1979, 1983, 1984, 1989, 1994, The Italian foreign Ministry 1987 and Radio France 1981 and 1988 among other prominent commissioning bodies.

Among the recognized creations Sandro Gorli includes:

- "Me – Ti", by order of Bruno Maderna for the RAI National Symphony Orchestra of radio and television in Milan
- "Chimera la luce" for the vocal sextet, piano, chorus and orchestra
- "Il bambino perduto" for orchestra
- String Quartet
- "Super flumina" for oboe, viola and orchestra
- "Le due sorgenti" for chamber orchestra
- "Requiem" in memory of Nathalia Mefano for authentic chorus La Chapelle Royale
- Opera "Solo"
- Opera "Le mal de lune" (debuted in Colmar and Strasbourg in 1994)

== Award ==
- European Award 1985 for the Opera "Solo" for musical theatre
