= Marina Scalafiotti =

Italian pianist and teacher

Marina Scalafiotti (born in Settimo Torinese, May 22, 1965) is an Italian pianist and teacher known for her interpretations spanning from baroque to contemporary music.

== Biography ==
=== Education ===
Marina Scalafiotti started studying piano at the Conservatorio Giuseppe Verdi of Turin, graduating with highest honors under Amelia Careggio. She studied harpsichord with Giorgio Tabacco at the same conservatory and chamber music with the Trio di Trieste at the Scuola di Musica di Fiesole.

She refined her skills with internationally renowned masters including Maria Golia, Lazar Berman, Orazio Frugoni, Boris Petrushansky, Boris Bloch and Vincenzo Balzani. In 1995, thanks to a scholarship from the De Sono Association, she moved to Paris to study at the École Normale de Musique "Alfred Cortot" with Nelson Delle-Vigne Fabbri, a pupil of Claudio Arrau, becoming his assistant.

=== Awards ===
Winner at age sixteen of the Stresa International Competition in the avant-garde music section, Marina Scalafiotti has won twenty-three first prizes in national and international competitions. In 1992 she won the prestigious "Città di Treviso" competition, which led to a tour of piano and orchestra concerts under Gianandrea Noseda and Pierangelo Gelmini. She also received the Prix "Spedidam" and the award for best pianist of French school at the "Orléans XX Siècle" International Competition.

=== Concert career ===
Marina Scalafiotti has performed in prestigious concert halls in Europe and South America, including the Royal Concertgebouw in Amsterdam, Usher Hall in Edinburgh, Auditorium Rai in Turin, Palazzo Pitti in Florence, Salle Pleyel and Salle Cortot in Paris, and Sala Verdi in Milan.

She has collaborated with internationally renowned conductors such as Gianandrea Noseda, Gianluigi Gelmetti, Karel Mark Chichon, Ovidiu Balan and Antonello Gotta.

Her performances have been recorded by national and European radio and television broadcasters, including Rai Radio, Radio France, Bayerischer Rundfunk, RTBF, Rai, Classica and Arte.

=== Teaching ===
She currently teaches piano at the Conservatorio "Giuseppe Verdi" in Turin.

She has given masterclasses in Belgium, France and Spain, and has been invited as a guest lecturer under the Erasmus programme at the Hochschule für Musik und Theater Hamburg and McGill University in Montreal.

Since 2019 she has run the YouTube channel Telemasterclass, dedicated to piano pedagogy, with video tutorials on technique, masterclasses on repertoire pieces and performances by students and faculty.

In 2025, on the centenary of Erik Satie's death, she participated as a speaker at the international conference Satie 2025 organized by the University of Turin, presenting in Honfleur, the composer's birthplace, the paper "Satie and the echo of irony: aesthetic filiations and pianistic incarnations in the composers of the Group of Six".

=== Cultural projects ===
Marina Scalafiotti founded the association Orium APS, of which she is president, with the aim of creating a network between art, education and environment in the Canavese territory. The association organizes concerts in historic residences of the region, including castles and churches.

Through Orium APS, she organizes the concert series "AURA: Live Music, Living Places", a series of free concerts held in historic venues in Canavese, including the Castello ducale di Agliè and the Castle of Barone Canavese.

Since 2024 she has organized the Pianists Summer Retreat, a week of piano masterclasses in Orio Canavese with a "distributed school" format, with lessons held in various locations around the village.
