= Essercizi per gravicembalo =

1739 harpsichord sonata collection by Domenico Scarlatti

- Baroque sonatas by Domenico Scarlatti
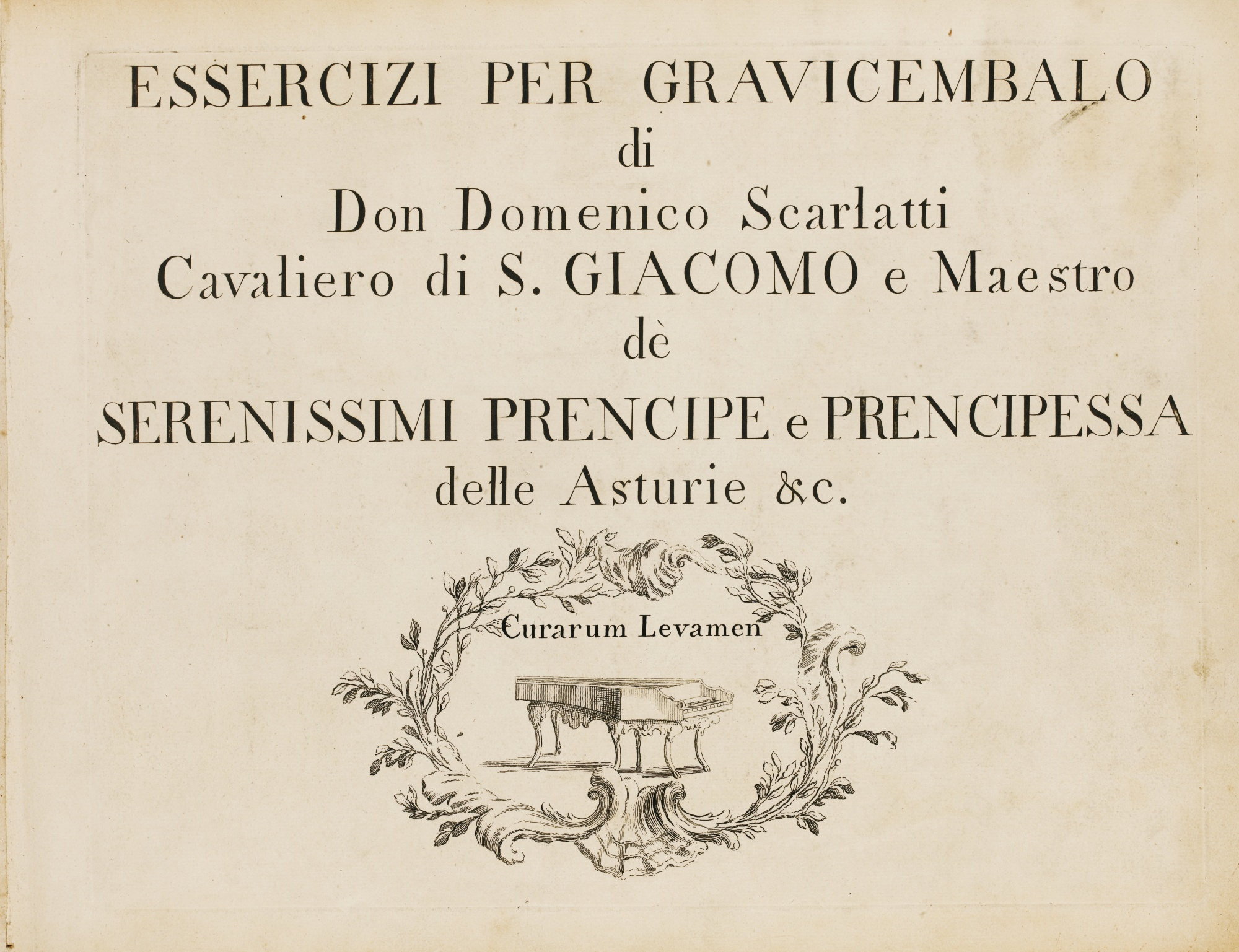
- Written: Before 1738
- Dedication: John V of Portugal
- Instrumental: Harpsichord

Essercizi per gravicembalo (Exercises for Harpsichord) is a collection of thirty single movement sonatas by Domenico Scarlatti. It was published in London on 3 February 1739 and dedicated by the composer to King John V of Portugal. The latter summoned the composer to Lisbon to teach his daughter, Barbara of Portugal, to play the harpsichord.

Presented as teaching tool, the pieces, often of great virtuosity, also earn a place in the concert hall through their musicality. Conceived for the harpsichord, they have also been honored on the piano by great virtuosos.

Of the 555 known sonatas written by Domenico Scarlatti, only these were edited with his participation. The rest remained unpublished while he was alive or were published without his supervision. Essercizi per gravicembalo made a technical musical contribution and gave innovative ideas to fellow composers of the time. Their main novelty consists in arpeggios, repeated notes and crossed hands, characteristics that to this day offer object lessons to students learning to play keyboard instruments. Like all of this composer’s pieces for harpsichord, these sonatas, invariably a single movement and a have binary structure, are imbued with the greatest originality, both musical and in interpretive technique.

The work begins with a preface: "Reader, do not expect, whether you are a dilettante or a professor, to find in these compositions any profound intention, but rather an ingenious banter in the art to exercise you in rigorous play of the harpsichord. No point of view or ambition guided me, but obedience brought me to publish it. Perhaps they will be agreeable to you, and I will more willingly then obey your other orders to please you with an easier and more varied style. Therefore do not show yourself more judge than critic, and you will thereby grow your own pleasure. To specify hand position I have used the letter D to indicate the right hand, and the letter M the left hand. Live happily (Good luck)."

Sonate K.9 en Ré mineur, Allegro

Sonate K.27 en Si mineur, Allegro

The collection bears the Kirkpatrick numbers K.1 to K.30:

- K.1 — Sonata in D minor, Allegro
- K.2 — Sonata in G major, Presto
- K.3 — Sonata in A minor, Presto
- K.4 — Sonata in G minor, Allegro
- K.5 — Sonata in D minor, Allegro
- K.6 — Sonata in F major, Allegro
- K.7 — Sonata in A minor, Presto
- K.8 — Sonata in G minor, Allegro
- K.9 — Sonata in D minor, Allegro
- K.10 — Sonata in D minor, Presto
- K.11 — Sonata in C minor
- K.12 — Sonata in G minor, Presto
- K.13 — Sonata in G major, Presto
- K.14 — Sonata in G major, Presto
- K.15 — Sonata in E minor, Allegro
- K.16 — Sonata in B flat major, Presto
- K.17 — Sonata in F major, Presto
- K.18 — Sonata in D minor, Presto
- K.19 — Sonata in F minor, Allegro
- K.20 — Sonata in E major, Presto
- K.21 — Sonata in D major, Allegro
- K.22 — Sonata in C major, Allegro
- K.23 — Sonata in D major, Allegro
- K.24 — Sonata in A major, Presto
- K.25 — Sonata in F sharp minor, Allegro
- K.26 — Sonata in A major, Presto
- K.27 — Sonata in B minor, Allegro
- K.28 — Sonata in E major, Presto
- K.29 — Sonata in D major, Presto
- K.30 — Sonata in G minor, Moderato (also known as "Cat's Fugue")

Twenty-three of these sonatas were adapted in the 1740s into concerto grosso by Charles Avison in his collection, 12 Concerti grossi.

== Bibliography ==
- Kirkpatrick, Ralph (1983-12-21). DOMENICO SCARLATTI: REVISED EDITION. Princeton University Press. ISBN 9780691027081.
