= Giorgio Pestelli =

Italian musicologist

Giorgio Pestelli (born 26 May 1938, Turin) is an Italian musicologist.

== Life and career ==
Giorgio Pestelli was born on 26 May 1938 in Turin, Italy. His early music instruction was from his great-uncle, the composer Luigi Perrachio (1883-1966). He then entered the Turin Conservatory from which he graduated in 1961. There he studied piano with Lodovico Lessona. He then pursued graduate studies at the University of Turin where he was a musicology student of Massimo Mila. He graduated in 1964.

Pestelli became an assistant lecturer at the Turin Conservatory in 1964. He was later made a lecturer in 1969 and a professor in 1976. His 1967 edition of the 555 keyboard sonatas of Domenico Scarlatti purports to correct some anachronisms and provides an alternative numbering system (distinguished by P numbers) to those of Alessandro Longo (L numbers) and Ralph Kirkpatrick (K or Kk numbers).

He has authored several books, including L'età di Mozart e di Beethoven (1979, 1991), Canti del destino. Studi su Brahms (2000, Viareggio Price, 2001), and Gli Immortali. Come comporre una discoteca di musica classica (2004).

== See also ==
- List of solo keyboard sonatas by Domenico Scarlatti
