= Cascioli =

Cascioli is an Italian surname. Notable people with the surname include:

- Cristiana Cascioli (born 1975), Italian fencer
- Gianluca Cascioli (born 1979), Italian pianist, conductor, and composer

== See also ==
- Caccioli
- Cassioli
