= Opus number =

Chronological position of a musical composition

In music, the opus number is the "work number" that is assigned to a musical composition, or to a set of compositions, to indicate the chronological order of the composer's publication of that work. Opus numbers are used to distinguish among compositions with similar titles; the word is abbreviated as "Op." for a single work, or "Opp." when referring to more than one work. Opus numbers do not necessarily indicate chronological order of composition. For example, posthumous publications of a composer's juvenilia (written as "Op. posth.") are often numbered after other works, even though they may be some of the composer's first completed works.

To indicate the specific place of a given work within a music catalogue, the opus number is paired with a cardinal number; for example, Beethoven's Piano Sonata No. 14 in C♯ minor (1801, nicknamed Moonlight Sonata) is "Opus 27, No. 2", whose work-number identifies it as a companion piece to "Opus 27, No. 1" (Piano Sonata No. 13 in E-flat major, 1800–01), paired in same opus number, with both being subtitled Sonata quasi una Fantasia, the only two of the kind in all of Beethoven's 32 piano sonatas. Furthermore, the Piano Sonata, Op. 27 No. 2, in C♯ minor is also catalogued as "Sonata No. 14", because it is the fourteenth sonata composed by Ludwig van Beethoven.

Given composers' inconsistent or non-existent assignment of opus numbers, especially during the Baroque (1600–1750) and the Classical (1750–1820) eras, musicologists have developed other catalogue-number systems; among them the Bach-Werke-Verzeichnis (BWV-number) and the Köchel-Verzeichnis (K- and KV-numbers), which enumerate the works of Johann Sebastian Bach and Wolfgang Amadeus Mozart, respectively.

== Etymology ==
In the classical period—the Latin word opus ("work", "labour"), plural opera—was used to identify, list, and catalogue a work of art.

By the 15th and 16th centuries, the word opus was used by Italian composers to denote a specific musical composition, and by German composers for collections of music. In compositional practice, numbering musical works in chronological order dates from 17th-century Italy, especially Venice. In common usage, the word opus is used to describe the best work of an artist with the term magnum opus.

In Latin, the words opus (singular) and opera (plural) are related to the words opera (singular) and operae (plural), which gave rise to the Italian words opera (singular) and opere (plural), likewise meaning "work". In contemporary English, the word opera has specifically come to denote the dramatic musical genres of opera or ballet, which were developed in Italy. As a result, the plural opera of opus tends to be avoided in English. (Note: Instead, common plurals include opuses, or opi in English.) However, in other languages, such as German, it remains common.

== Early usage ==
In the arts, an opus number usually denotes a work of musical composition, a practice and usage established in the seventeenth century when composers identified their works with an opus number. In the eighteenth century, publishers usually assigned opus numbers when publishing groups of like compositions, usually in sets of three, six or twelve compositions. Consequently, opus numbers were not usually in chronological order, unpublished compositions usually had no opus number, and numeration gaps and sequential duplications occurred when publishers issued contemporaneous editions of a composer's works, as in the sets of string quartets by Joseph Haydn and Ludwig van Beethoven; Haydn's Op. 76, the Erdödy quartets (1796–97), comprises six discrete quartets consecutively numbered Op. 76 No. 1 – Op. 76 No. 6; whilst Beethoven's Op. 59, the Rasumovsky quartets (1805–06), comprises String Quartet No. 7, String Quartet No. 8, and String Quartet No. 9.

== 19th century to date ==
From about 1800, composers usually assigned an opus number to a work or set of works upon publication. After approximately 1900, they tended to assign an opus number to a composition whether published or not. However, practices were not always perfectly consistent or logical. For example, early in his career, Beethoven selectively numbered his compositions (some published without opus numbers), yet in later years, he published early works with high opus numbers. Likewise, some posthumously published works were given high opus numbers by publishers, even though some of them were written early in Beethoven's career. Since his death in 1827, the un-numbered compositions have been catalogued and labelled with the German acronym WoO (Werk ohne Opuszahl), meaning "work without opus number"; (Note: See also Catalogues of Beethoven compositions) the same has been done with other composers who used opus numbers.

The practice of enumerating a posthumous opus ("Op. posth.") is noteworthy in the case of Felix Mendelssohn (1809–47); after his death, the heirs published many compositions with opus numbers that Mendelssohn did not assign. In life, he published two symphonies (Symphony No. 1 in C minor, Op. 11; and Symphony No. 3 in A minor, Op. 56), furthermore he published his symphony-cantata Lobgesang, Op. 52, which was posthumously counted as his Symphony No. 2; yet, he chronologically wrote symphonies between symphonies Nos. 1 and 2, which he withdrew for personal and compositional reasons; nevertheless, the Mendelssohn heirs published (and catalogued) them as the Symphony No. 4 in A major, Op. 90 Italian , and as the Symphony No. 5 in D major, Op. 107 Reformation.

While many of the works of Antonín Dvořák (1841–1904) were given opus numbers, these did not always bear a logical relationship to the order in which the works were written or published. To achieve better sales, some publishers, such as N. Simrock, preferred to present less experienced composers as being well established, by giving some relatively early works much higher opus numbers than their chronological order would merit. In other cases, Dvořák gave lower opus numbers to new works to be able to sell them to other publishers outside his contract obligations. This way it could happen that the same opus number was given to more than one of his works. Opus number 12, for example, was assigned, successively, to five different works (an opera, a concert overture, a string quartet, and two unrelated piano works). In other cases, the same work was given as many as three different opus numbers by different publishers. The sequential numbering of his symphonies has also been confused: (a) they were initially numbered by order of publication, not composition; (b) the first four symphonies to be composed were published after the last five; and (c) the last five symphonies were not published in order of composition. The New World Symphony originally was published as No. 5, later was known as No. 8, and definitively was renumbered as No. 9 in the critical editions published in the 1950s.

Other examples of composers' historically inconsistent opus-number usages include the cases of César Franck (1822–1890), Béla Bartók (1881–1945), and Alban Berg (1885–1935), who initially numbered, but then stopped numbering their compositions. Carl Nielsen (1865–1931) and Paul Hindemith (1895–1963) were also inconsistent in their approaches. Sergei Prokofiev (1891–1953) was consistent and assigned an opus number to a composition before composing it; at his death, he left fragmentary and planned, but numbered, works. In revising a composition, Prokofiev occasionally assigned a new opus number to the revision; thus Symphony No. 4 is two thematically related but discrete works: Symphony No. 4, Op. 47, written in 1929; and Symphony No. 4, Op. 112, a large-scale revision written in 1947. Likewise, depending upon the edition, the original version of Piano Sonata No. 5 in C major, is cataloged both as Op. 38 and as Op. 135.

Despite being used in more or less normal fashion by a number of important early-twentieth-century composers, including Arnold Schoenberg (1874–1951) and Anton Webern (1883–1945), opus numbers became less common in the later part of the twentieth century.

== Other catalogues ==
To manage inconsistent opus-number usages – especially by composers of the Baroque (1600–1750) and of the Classical (1720–1830) music eras – musicologists have developed comprehensive and unambiguous catalogue number-systems for the works of composers such as:

- Johann Sebastian Bach – catalogued with a BWV-number; a Bach-Werke-Verzeichnis number assigned by Wolfgang Schmieder; however, older sources occasionally use S-numbers.
- Dietrich Buxtehude – catalogued with a BuxWV-number, a Buxtehude-Werke-Verzeichnis work number.
- Marc-Antoine Charpentier – identified with an H-number per H.W. Hitchcock's comprehensive catalogue.
- Frédéric Chopin – four catalogue systems have been applied: (i) B-numbers, by Maurice J. E. Brown; (ii) KK-numbers, by Krystyna Kobylańska; (iii) work-letters (A, C, D, E, P and S), by Józef Michał Chomiński; and (iv) WN-numbers in the Chopin National Edition. Generally, these alternative music-catalogue systems identified compositions that the composer had not numbered.
- Claude Debussy – identified with an L-number, per François Lesure's comprehensive catalogue.
- Antonín Dvořák – identified with a B-number, per Jarmil Burghauser's comprehensive catalogue; which resolved the problems of different and duplicate opus-numbers assigned by the publishers of Dvořák's music.
- Joseph Haydn – identified with a Hob.-number, per the 1957 catalogue by Anthony van Hoboken. Although he assigned Hoboken-numbers to the string quartets, those compositions usually are known by opus numbers.
- Franz Liszt – identified with an S-number, per the catalogue The Music of Liszt (1960), by Humphrey Searle.
- Wolfgang Amadeus Mozart – identified either with a K-number or with a KV-number (Köchel-Verzeichnis nummer), per the catalogue system of Ludwig Ritter von Köchel.
- Niccolò Paganini – identified with an MS-number, per the 1982 Catalogo tematico, by Moretti and Sorrento.
- Domenico Scarlatti – identified with three catalogue systems; (i) L-numbers, per the 1906 catalogue by Alessandro Longo; (ii) K-numbers and Kk-numbers, per the 1953 catalogue by Ralph Kirkpatrick; and (iii) P-numbers, per the 1967 catalogue by Giorgio Pestelli.
- Franz Schubert – identified with a D-number, per the catalogue of Otto Erich Deutsch.
- Maurice Ravel – identified with an M-number, per the 1986 catalogue by Marcel Marnat.
- Henry Purcell – identified with a Z-number, per the catalogue by Franklin B. Zimmerman.
- Antonio Vivaldi – identified with a RV number, per the Ryom-Verzeichnis catalogue by Peter Ryom.
- Gustav Holst – identified with an H. catalogue number, per A Thematic Catalogue of Gustav Holst's Music by Imogen Holst.

== Use outside composition ==
Large instruments produced by pipe organ makers such as C. B. Fisk, Inc. and Casavant Frères are frequently referred to through opus numbers. The practice is distinct, as these numbers sometimes refer to jobs rather than completed instruments. As a result depending on the company's practice, a given Opus number may be for a job that was cancelled, or a restoration rather than a construction from scratch.

== See also ==
- WoO
