= Luigi Perrachio =

Italian composer, pianist, and teacher

- Born: 28 May 1883; Turin, Kingdom of Italy
- Died: 6 September 1966 (aged 83); Turin, Italy
- Occupations: Composer; Teacher

Luigi Perrachio was an Italian composer.

== Life ==
Luigi Perrachio was born in Turin, Piedmont, in the Kingdom of Italy, on 28 May 1883 (the same city and year as his later friend and colleague Alfredo Casella), to Ludovico Perrachio and Luisa née Elia, both amateur pianists. He learnt the organ and cello in his childhood.

His first studies in piano were with Cesare Boerio and Ermenegildo Gilardini in Turin. From 1906 to 1907, he studied with Ignaz Brüll in Vienna. In 1913, he earnt diplomas in piano and composition at the Bologna Conservatory (then the Liceo Musicale).

In 1908, he completed his legal studies at the University of Turin. In 1913, he married Irene Calendri, with whom he would have a son, Ludovico, in 1921.

Perrachio lived in Turin all his life. He died there on 6 September 1966.

== Music ==
=== Composition ===
Perrachio did not publish prolifically and was, in Jed Distler's words, "loath to promote himself." The Musical Times described him as "working silently, but faithfully and conscientiously." In 1918, Guido M. Gatti introduced Perrachio in La Critica Musicale as an important unknown, unpublished talent; and in a review of Nove poemetti (Nine Little Poems), Mario Castelnuovo-Tedesco writes that, "finally! Luigi Perrachio has published some of his piano pieces: more compelled by the affectionate pressures of his friends than by the impulse of his own will." His work was therefore neglected for some time after his death.

Perrachio's early works include a piano sonata and string quartet in a late romantic style influenced by César Franck and Johannes Brahms (with whom his teacher Brüll had been friends).

After the First World War, a new style emerged, influenced especially by Claude Debussy (whose music he had ecountered on a trip to Paris), and exemplified by the Nove Poemetti, written 1917–20. Perrachio's book on L'opera pianistica di Claude Debussy (The Pianistic Work of Claude Debussy) was published in 1924. Over the 1920s, Perrachio gradually, in Giorgio Pestelli's words, "freed himself from the Debussyan heritage," becoming more interested in dissonance and architectural forms, as in the Venticinque Preludi (Twenty-Five Preludes) of 1929, which David Korevaar describes as "more neo-classical" than the earlier work, and which Attilio Piovano considers one of Perrachio's most important works. An interest in Italian folk music can be observed throughout his career, from the Sonate popolaresche italiane (Italian Folk Sonatas) of 1925–26 to the Tre canzoni piemontesi fiorite e variate (Three Ornamented and Varied Piedmontese Songs) of 1958.

=== Teaching ===
Perrachio taught at the Istituto Musicale (Musical Institute) of Turin (which became the Turin Conservatory in 1936) from 1925 to 1955. He taught piano from 1925 onwards and composition from 1940 onwards. He briefly succeeded Lodovico Rocca as director of the Conservatory from August to November 1943.

Perrachio's students include Ettore Desderi, Giorgio Pestelli (Perrachio's great-nephew) and Flavio Testi.

=== Other musical activity ===
Perrachio wrote frequently for the journals Il Pianoforte and La Rassegna musicale. His books include one on Debussy (1924) and another on J. S. Bach's Well-Tempered Clavier (1926).

Among Perrachio's musical associates were Gatti (who had introduced the then little known Perrachio in the journal La Critica Musicale in December 1918; Perrachio, in turn, dedicated a piano quintet to Gatti in 1919), the composers Casella, Giorgio Federico Ghedini and Gian Francesco Malipiero, and the pianists Walter Gieseking and Ricardo Viñes.

== Selected compositions ==
=== For piano ===
- Nove poemetti [Nine Little Poems] (Bologna: Pizzi, 1921).
- Il re guardiano d'oche [The Goose-Guarding King] (Milan: Ricordi, 1922).
- Venticinque Preludi [Twenty-Five Preludes] (Milan: Ricordi, 1929).

=== For harp ===
- Tre pezzi [Three Pieces] (Milan: Ricordi, 1926).

== Selected written works ==
- L'opera pianistica di C. Debussy [The Pianistic Works of Claude Debussy] (Milan, 1924).
- Il Clavicembalo ben temperato di J. S. Bach [J. S. Bach's Well-Tempered Clavier] (Milan, 1926).
- Trattato d'armonia [Teatise on Harmony] (Rome, 1927).
- Bele fije e galantin: Personaggi della canzone popolare piemontese [Beautiful Girls and Gallant Boys: Characters of Piedmontese Folksong] (Turin, 1951).
- I principi fondamentali della composizione musicale [Fundamental Principles of Musical Composition] (Rome, 1955).
