= Keyboard Sonata, K. 141 (Scarlatti) =

Piece of Music

- Sonata by Domenico Scarlatti
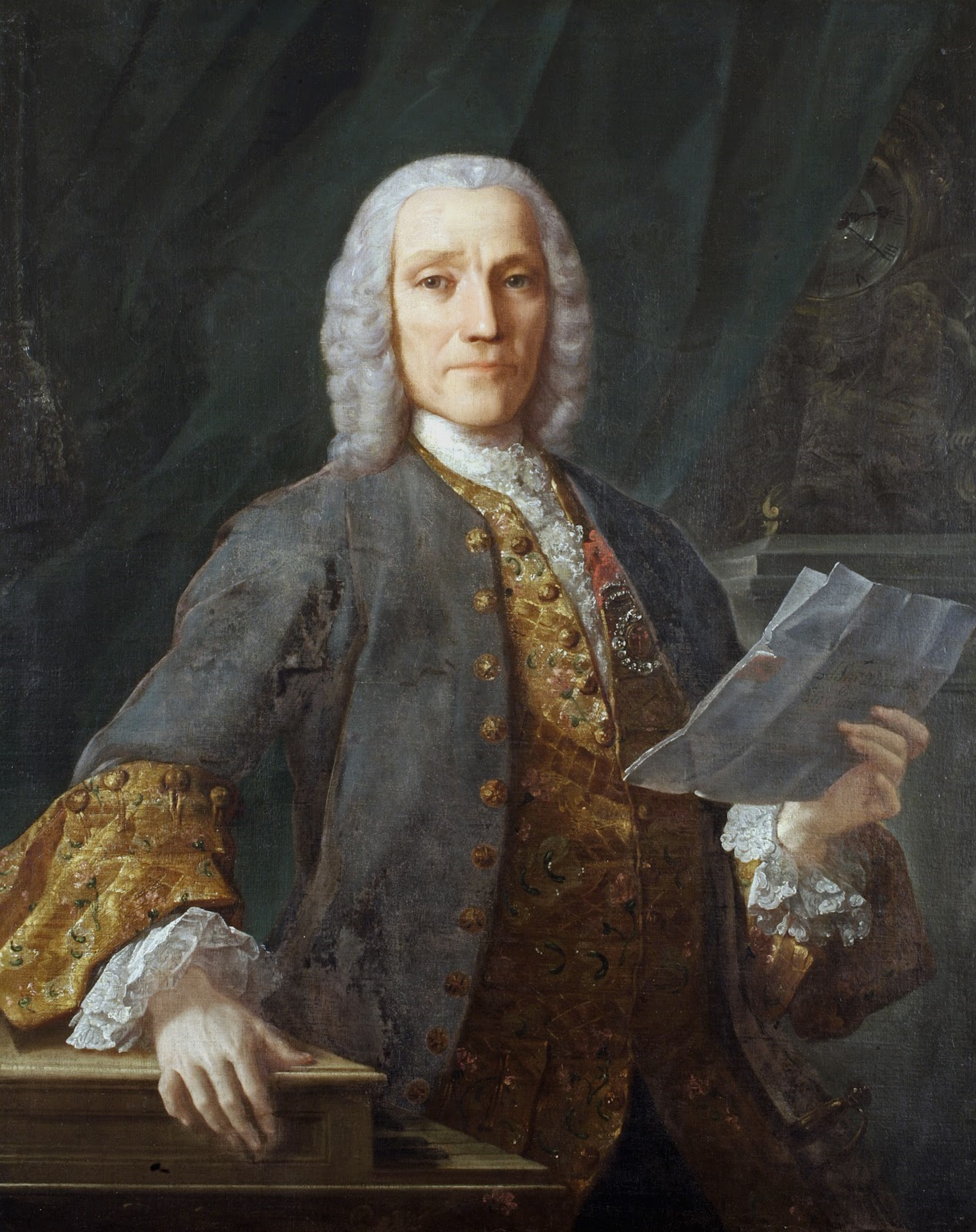
- Domenico Scarlatti in 1738
- Key: D minor
- Opus: 141
- Scoring: harpsichord

The Keyboard Sonata in D minor, K. 141, is a solo keyboard sonata written for harpsichord by the Italian composer Domenico Scarlatti. The sonata is characterised by fast repeated notes throughout, which makes it generally difficult to play. Because of its virtuosity, the piece is also described as a toccata. The piece contains many idioms characteristic of Scarlatti, such as hand crossing, a technique most closely associated with the composer. The piece is in D minor, which is Scarlatti's most used minor key. Scarlatti's sonata shows a Spanish influence, especially of Spanish dance music with guitar technique and syncopated rhythms.

== Form ==
Despite the name, the overwhelming majority of Scarlatti's keyboard sonatas (including the Sonata K. 141) are not in sonata form, as they were written before sonata form was developed/codified. The sonata has one movement in binary form; its time signature is 3/8.

== Score ==
Beginning of the sonata in D minor, K. 141, by Domenico Scarlatti.
