= Alberto Soresina =

- Born: 10 May 1911; Milan, Italy
- Died: 2007 (aged 95–96)
- Occupation: Musician
- Instrument: Piano

Alberto Soresina (born in Milan, 10 May 1911 and died in 2007) was an Italian musicologist and composer.

== Biography ==
Born in Milan in 1911, he studied at the Milan Conservatory and at Accademia Musicale Chigiana in Siena. He was a professor of singing at the Milan Conservatory and Turin Conservatory (1959-1962), and later composition at the Milan Conservatory.

One of his teachers was Vito Frazzi, and among his students were Luca Casagrande, Rubén Domínguez, Mario Duel, Franca Fabbri, Enrico Fissore, Marcello Sorce Keller, Andrea Forte, Stefano Secco, Mira Sulpizi, and Fausto Tenzi.

He composed several works for piano, choral and chamber music.

== Works ==
- Lanterna rossa (1942)
- Cuor di cristallo (1942)
- L'amuleto (1954)
- Tre sogni per Marina (1967)
