= K30 =

K30 may refer to:

- K-30 (Kansas highway)
- K30 Biho, a South Korean self-propelled anti-aircraft weapon
- K-30 truck, an American military truck
- Cat fugue by Domenico Scarlatti
- Pentax K-30, a digital camera
- Redmi K30, a smartphones
- Sonata in F, K. 30, by Wolfgang Amadeus Mozart
