= List of solo keyboard sonatas by Domenico Scarlatti =

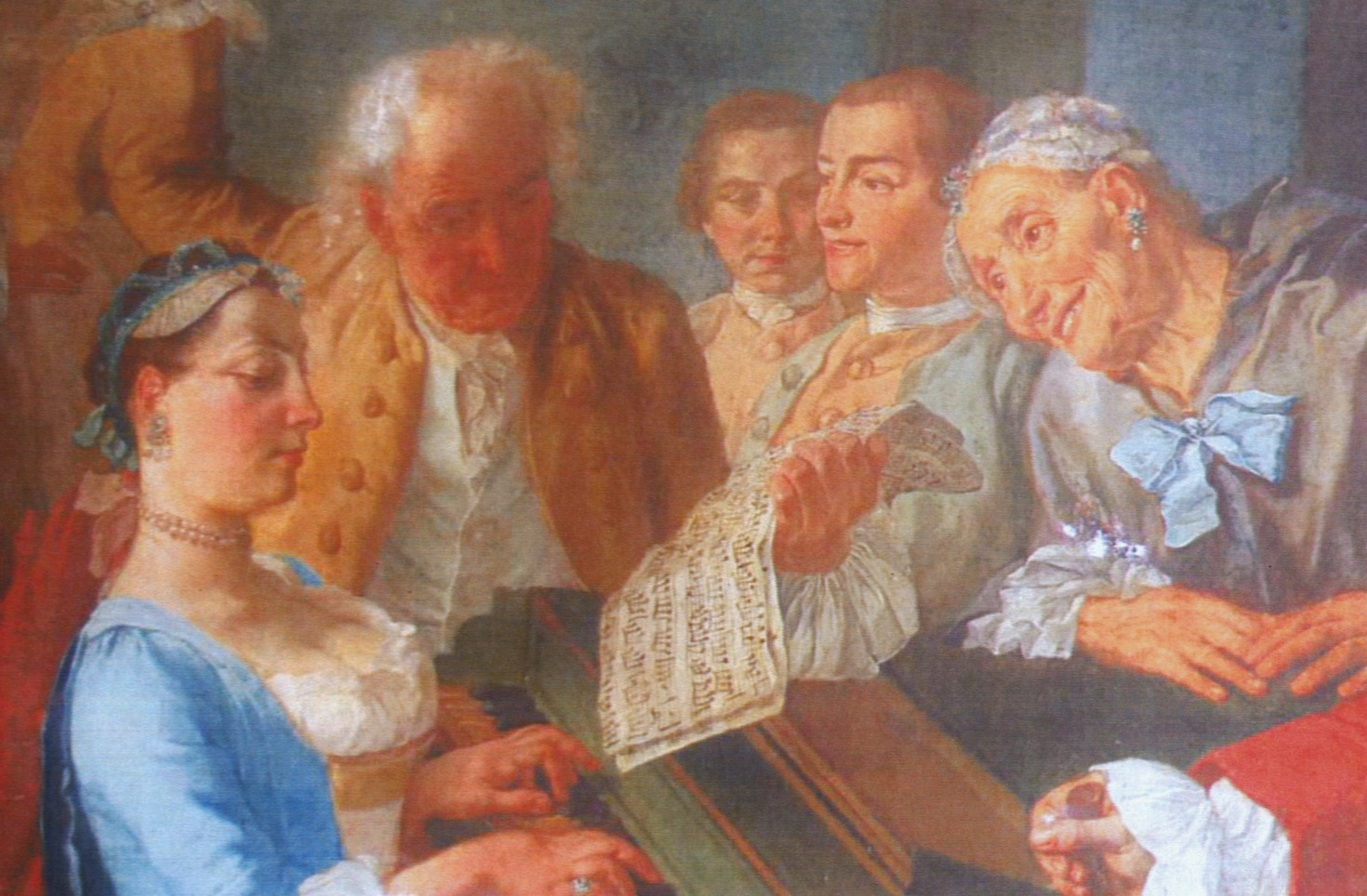
Detail of a painting by Gaspare Traversi, showing Scarlatti tutoring Princess Barbara of Portugal

Italian composer Domenico Scarlatti (1685–1757) wrote 555 solo keyboard sonatas throughout his career. Circulated irregularly in his lifetime, these are now recognized as a significant contribution which pushed the musical and technical standards of keyboard music. The works were probably most often performed in Scarlatti's time on the harpsichord, yet the Spanish royal court at which Scarlatti wrote them also possessed early versions of the piano (see fortepiano), which had been invented by Cristofori during Scarlatti's own lifetime. Modern performers may choose between the harpsichord, the fortepiano, or indeed the modern piano.

For discussion of the musical form and characteristics of the sonatas, see Domenico Scarlatti.

== Editions ==
The list below can be sorted by any of the four sets of catalogue numbers:

- K: Ralph Kirkpatrick (1953; sometimes Kk. or Kp.)
- L: Alessandro Longo (1906)
- P: Giorgio Pestelli (1967)
- CZ: Carl Czerny

== Solo keyboard sonatas ==
Solo keyboard sonatas by Domenico Scarlatti
K	L	P	CZ	Key	Tempo	Recording (Note: All recordings are by harpsichordist John Sankey unless otherwise noted.)
1	366	57	6	D minor	Allegro	
2	388	58	7	G major	Presto	
3	378	59	8	A minor	Presto	
4	390	60	9	G minor	Allegro	
5	367	61	10	D minor	Allegro	
6	479	62	11	F major	Allegro	
7	379	63	12	A minor	Presto	
8	488	64	13	G minor	Allegro	
9	413	65	14	D minor	Allegro	
10	370	66	15	D minor	Presto	
11	352	67	17	C minor	Allegro	
12	489	68	18	G minor	Presto	
13	486	69	19	G major	Presto	
14	387	70	20	G major	Presto	
15	374	71	21	E minor	Allegro	
16	397	72	22	B♭ major	Presto	
17	384	73	23	F major	Presto	
18	416	74	24	D minor	Presto	
19	383	75	25	F minor	Allegro	
20	375	76	26	E major	Presto	
21	363	77	27	D major	Allegro	
22	360	78	28	C minor	Allegro	
23	411	79	29	D major	Allegro	
24	495	80	30	A major	Presto	
25	481	81	31	F♯ minor	Allegro	
26	368	82	32	A major	Presto	
27	449	83	33	B minor	Allegro	
28	373	84	34	E major	Presto	
29	461	85	36	D major	Presto	
30	499	86	199	G minor (Note: Has been called the "Cat fugue")	Moderato	
31	231	19	59	G minor	Allegro	
32	423	14	–	D minor	Aria	
33	424	130	58	D major	–	
34	S7	15	–	D minor	Larghetto	
35	386	20	35	G minor	Allegro	
36	245	91	61	A minor	Allegro	
37	406	2	62	C minor	Allegro	
38	478	97	60	F major	Allegro	
39	391	53	65	A major	Allegro	
40	357	119	–	C minor	Minuetto	
41	–	37	198	D minor	Andante moderato	
42	S36	120	–	B♭ major	Minuetto	
43	40	133	–	G minor	Allegro assai	
44	432	116	175	F major	Allegro	
45	265	230	93	D major	Allegro	
46	25	179	–	E major	Presto	
47	46	115	–	B♭ major	Presto	
48	157	87	–	C minor	Presto	
49	301	178	–	C major	Presto	
50	440	144	181	F minor	Allegro	
51	20	151	–	E♭ major	Allegro	
52	267	41	–	D minor	Andante moderato	
53	261	161	173	D major	Presto	
54	241	147	53	A minor	Allegro	
55	335	117	161	G major	Allegro	
56	356	50	57	C minor	Con spirito	
57	S38	108	–	B♭ major	Allegro	
58	158	39	–	C minor	–	
59	71	22	–	F major	Allegro	
60	13	29	–	G minor	–	
61	136	16	–	A minor	–	
62	45	49	–	A major	Allegro	
63	84	32	–	G major	Allegro	
64	58	33	–	D minor	Allegro	
65	195	142	–	A major	Allegro	
66	496	134	98	B♭ major	Allegro	
67	32	125	–	F♯ minor	Allegro	
68	114	7	–	E♭ major	–	
69	382	42	115	F minor	–	
70	50	21	–	B♭ major	–	
71	81	17	–	G major	Allegro	
72	401	1	–	C major	Allegro	
73	217	30	–	C minor	Allegro – Minuetto – Minuetto	
74	94	34	–	A major	Allegro	
75	53	35	–	G major	Allegro	
76	185	23	–	G minor	Presto	
77	168	10	–	D minor	Moderato e cantabile – Minuet	
78	75	26	–	F major	Allegro – Minuet	
79	80	204	–	G major	Allegrissimo	
80	–	28	–	G major	Minuet	
81	271	13	–	E minor	Grave – Allegro – Grave – Allegro	
82	30	25	–	F major	–	
83	S31	31	–	A major	–	
84	10	45	–	C minor	–	
85	166	24	–	F major	–	
86	403	122	–	C major	Andante moderato	
87	33	43	–	B minor	–	
88	36	8	–	G minor	Grave – Andante moderato – Allegro	
89	211	12	–	D minor	Allegro – Grave – Allegro	
90	106	9	–	D minor	Grave – Allegro – No tempo indication – Allegro	
91	176	11	–	G major	Grave – Allegro – Grave – Allegro	
92	362	44	–	D minor	–	
93	336	38	–	G minor	–	
94	–	27	–	F major	Minuet	
95	358	–	83	C major	–	
96	465	210	79	D major	Allegrissimo	
97	–	5	–	G minor	Allegro	
98	325	219	–	E minor	Allegrissimo	
99	317	135	–	C minor	Allegro	
100	355	232	105	C major	Allegrissimo	
101	494	156	74	A major	Allegro	
102	89	88	–	G minor	Allegro	
103	233	233	–	G major	Allegrissimo	
104	442	109	117	G major	Allegro	
105	204	90	–	G major	Allegro	
106	437	197	107	F major	Allegro	
107	474	98	106	F major	Allegro	
108	249	92	167	G minor	Allegro	
109	138	290	–	A minor	Adagio	
110	469	129	–	A minor	Allegro	
111	130	99	–	G minor	Allegro	
112	298	94	63	B♭ major	Allegro	
113	345	160	52	A major	Allegro	
114	344	141	–	A major	Spirito e presto	
115	407	100	64	C minor	Allegro	
116	452	111	76	C minor	Allegro	
117	244	181	108	C major	Allegro	
118	122	266	–	D major	Non presto	
119	415	217	68	D major	Allegro	
120	215	146	84	D minor	Allegrissimo	
121	181	93	–	G minor	Allegrissimo	
122	334	118	–	D major	Allegro	
123	111	180	–	E♭ major	Allegro	
124	232	110	48	G major	Allegro	
125	487	152	1	G major	Vivo	
126	402	128	2	C minor	Allegro	
127	186	198	3	A♭ major	Allegro	
128	296	199	–	B♭ minor	Allegro	
129	460	148	–	C minor	Allegro	
130	190	272	–	A♭ major	Allegro	
131	300	154	4	B♭ minor	Allegro	
132	457	295	77	C major	Cantabile	
133	282	218	90	C major	Allegro	
134	221	143	51	E major	Allegro	
135	224	234	78	E major	Allegro	
136	377	113	109	E major	Allegro	
137	315	231	–	D major	Allegro	
138	464	95	–	D minor	Allegro	
139	6	126	–	C minor	Presto	
140	107	127	–	D major	Allegro	
141	422	271	118	D minor	Allegro	
142	–	240	–	F♯ minor	Allegro	
143	–	267	–	C major	Allegro	
144	–	316	–	G major	Cantabile	
145	369	105	–	D major	–	
146	349	106	–	G major	Allegro	
147	376	48	116	E minor	–	
148	64	291	–	A minor	Andante	
149	93	241	–	A minor	Allegro	
150	117	205	–	F major	Allegro	
151	330	238	–	F major	Andante allegro	
152	179	114	–	G major	Allegro	
153	445	235	–	G major	Vivo	
154	96	183	–	B♭ major	Allegro	
155	197	208	–	B♭ major	Allegro	
156	101	248	104	C major	Allegro	
157	405	391	–	C major	Allegro	
158	4	123	–	C minor	Andante	
159	104	418	71	C major	Allegro	
160	15	131	–	D major	Allegro	
161	417	216	–	D major	Allegro	
162	21	162	–	E major	Andante – Allegro	
163	63	206	–	E major	Allegro	
164	59	274	–	D major	Andante moderato	
165	52	292	–	C major	Andante	
166	51	190	–	C major	Allegro ma non molto	
167	329	200	–	F major	Allegro	
168	280	182	–	F major	Vivo	
169	331	247	–	G major	Allegro	
170	303	164	–	C major	Andante – Allegro	
171	77	153	–	G major	Allegro	
172	S40	313	112	B♭ major	Allegro	
173	447	51	179	B minor	Allegro	
174	410	149	–	C minor	Allegro	
175	429	136	–	A minor	Allegro	
176	163	163	111	D minor	Cantabile andante – Allegrissimo	
177	364	184	–	D major	Andante	
178	162	392	127	D major	Vivo	
179	177	89	16	G minor	Allegro	
180	272	192	85	G major	Allegro vivo	
181	194	253	–	A major	Allegro	
182	139	207	5	A major	Allegro	
183	473	150	114	F minor	Allegro	
184	189	102	–	F minor	Allegro	
185	173	121	–	F minor	Andante	
186	72	46	–	F minor	Allegro	
187	285	145	–	F minor	Allegro	
188	239	213	–	A minor	Allegro	
189	143	257	–	B♭ major	Allegro	
190	250	256	113	B♭ major	Allegro	
191	207	18	–	D minor	Allegro	
192	216	322	102	E♭ major	Allegro	
193	142	254	–	E♭ major	Allegro	
194	28	479	–	F major	Andante	
195	S18	185	–	F major	Vivo	
196	38	244	–	G minor	Allegro	
197	147	124	–	B minor	Andante	
198	22	132	–	E minor	Allegro	
199	253	276	–	C major	Andante moderato	
200	54	242	–	C major	Allegro	
201	129	252	180	G major	Vivo	
202	498	173	110	B♭ major	Allegro	
203	380	96	–	E minor	Vivo non molto	
204a	–	170	–	F minor	Allegro	
204b	–	255	–	F minor	Allegro – Allegro – Allegrissimo	
205	S23	171	–	F major	Vivo	
206	257	307	94	E major	Andante	
207	371	140	–	E major	Allegro	
208	238	315	–	A major	Adagio e cantabile	
209	428	209	–	A major	Allegro	
210	123	293	–	G major	Andante	
211	133	277	49	A major	Andantino	
212	135	155	182	A major	Allegro molto	
213	108	288	–	D minor	Andante	
214	165	430	–	D major	Allegro vivo	
215	323	281	80	E major	Andante	
216	273	320	66	E major	Allegro	
217	42	287	–	A minor	Andante	
218	392	237	101	A minor	Vivo	
219	393	278	–	A major	Andante	
220	342	309	–	A major	Allegro	
221	259	215	–	A major	Allegro	
222	309	236	–	A major	Vivo	
223	214	188	133	D major	Allegro	
224	268	225	134	D major	Vivo	
225	351	202	–	C major	Allegro	
226	112	101	–	C minor	Allegro	
227	347	52	–	B minor	Allegro	
228	399	224	–	B♭ major	Allegro	
229	199	139	135	B♭ major	Allegro vivo	
230	354	47	–	C minor	Allegro	
231	409	393	–	C major	Allegro	
232	62	317	–	E minor	Andante	
233	467	497	136	E minor	Allegro	
234	49	286	–	G minor	Andante	
235	154	172	–	G major	Allegro	
236	161	201	–	D major	Allegro	
237	308	446	–	D major	Allegro	
238	27	55	–	F minor	Andante	
239	281	56	–	F minor	Allegro	
240	S29	368	–	G major	Allegro	
241	180	431	137	G major	Allegro	
242	202	243	–	C major	Vivo	
243	353	394	–	C major	Allegro	
244	348	298	75	B major	Allegro	
245	450	299	–	B major	Allegro	
246	260	296	88	C♯ minor	Allegro	
247	256	297	81	C♯ minor	Allegro	
248	S35	187	–	B♭ major	Allegro	
249	39	424	–	B♭ major	Allegro	
250	174	461	–	C major	Allegro	
251	305	314	–	C major	Allegro	
252	159	203	–	E♭ major	Allegro	
253	320	239	–	E♭ major	Allegro	
254	219	186	–	C minor	Allegro	
255	439	226	–	C major	Allegro	
256	228	480	–	F major	Andante	
257	169	138	138	F major	Allegro	
258	178	494	–	D major	Andante	
259	103	469	54	G major	Andante	
260	124	304	56	G major	Allegro	
261	148	300	166	B major	Allegro	
262	446	301	–	B major	Vivo	
263	321	283	–	E minor	Andante	
264	466	308	–	E major	Vivo	
265	S32	168	121	A minor	Allegro	
266	48	251	–	B♭ major	Andante	
267	434	363	–	B♭ major	Allegro	
268	41	369	–	A major	Allegro	
269	307	432	–	A major	Allegro	
270	459	481	–	C major	–	
271	155	447	–	C major	Vivo	
272	145	518	–	B♭ major	Allegro	
273	398	174	–	B♭ major	Vivo – Moderato	
274	297	491	–	F major	Andante	
275	328	330	122	F major	Allegro	
276	S20	433	–	F major	Allegro	
277	183	275	–	D major	Cantabile andantino	
278	S15	434	162	D major	Con velocita	
279	468	306	–	A major	Andante	
280	237	395	–	A major	Allegro	
281	56	289	–	D major	Andante	
282	484	166	–	D major	Allegro	
283	318	482	123	G major	Andante allegro	
284	90	169	–	G major	Allegro	
285	91	321	–	A major	Andante allegro	
286	394	410	–	A major	Allegro	
287	S9	310	–	D major (Note: For chamber organ with 2 manuals)	Andante allegro	
288	57	311	–	D major (Note: For chamber organ with 2 manuals)	Allegro	
289	78	249	–	G major	Allegro	
290	85	396	–	G major	Allegro	
291	61	282	–	E minor	Andante	
292	24	223	–	E minor	Allegro	
293	S44	157	–	B minor	Allegro	
294	67	470	–	D minor	Andante	
295	270	211	–	D minor	Allegro	
296	198	305	–	F major	Andante	
297	S19	448	–	F major	Allegro	
298	S6	194	87	D major	Allegro	
299	210	268	82	D major	Allegro	
300	92	312	–	A major	Andante	
301	493	361	–	A major	Allegro	
302	7	279	–	C minor	Andante	
303	9	212	–	C minor	Allegro	
304	88	492	–	G major	Andante cantabile	
305	322	397	–	G major	Allegro	
306	16	456	–	E♭ major	Allegro	
307	115	449	–	E♭ major	Allegro	
308	359	318	–	C major	Cantabile	
309	454	333	–	C major	Allegro	
310	248	284	–	B♭ major	Andante	
311	144	227	–	B♭ major	Allegro	
312	264	334	–	D major	Allegro	
313	192	398	120	D major	Allegro	
314	441	505	–	G major	Allegro	
315	235	54	119	G minor	Allegro	
316	299	193	–	F major	Allegro	
317	66	258	–	F major	Allegro	
318	31	302	–	F♯ major	Andante	
319	35	303	–	F♯ major	Allegro	
320	341	335	–	A major	Allegro	
321	258	450	–	A major	Allegro	
322	483	360	–	A major	Allegro	
323	95	411	–	A major	Allegro	
324	332	285	–	G major	Andante	
325	37	451	–	G major	Allegro	
326	201	336	128	C major	Allegro	
327	152	399	129	C major	Allegro	
328	S27	485	–	G major	Andante comodo	
329	S5	337	–	C major	Allegro	
330	55	222	–	C major	Allegro	
331	18	471	–	B♭ major	Andante	
332	141	519	–	B♭ major	Allegro	
333	269	338	–	D major	Allegro – Allegrissimo	
334	100	412	–	B♭ major	Allegro	
335	S10	339	–	D major	Allegro	
336	337	262	–	D major	Allegro	
337	S26	340	–	G major	Allegro	
338	87	400	–	G major	Allegro	
339	251	189	–	C major	Allegro	
340	105	420	–	C major	Allegro	
341	140	103	–	A minor	Allegro	
342	191	341	–	A major	Allegro	
343	291	495	165	A major	Allegro andante	
344	295	221	–	A major	Allegro	
345	306	342	–	D major	Allegro	
346	60	250	–	D major	Allegro	
347	126	294	177	G minor	Moderato cantabile	
348	127	462	178	G major	Prestissimo	
349	170	452	–	F major	Allegro	
350	230	413	–	F major	Allegro	
351	S34	165	–	B♭ major	Andante – Allegrissimo	
352	S13	343	–	D major	Allegro	
353	313	401	–	D major	Allegro	
354	68	486	–	F major	Andante	
355	S22	344	–	F major	Allegro	
356	443	488	–	C major	Con spirito andante	
357	S45	270	–	C major	Allegro	
358	412	457	–	D major	Allegro	
359	448	425	–	D major	Allegrissimo	
360	400	520	–	B♭ major	Allegro	
361	247	214	–	B♭ major	Allegrissimo	
362	156	159	–	C minor	Allegro	
363	160	104	–	C minor	Presto	
364	436	345	125	F minor	Allegro	
365	480	112	126	F minor	Allegro	
366	119	263	89	F major	Allegro	
367	172	453	130	F major	Presto	
368	S30	506	131	A major	Allegro	
369	240	259	132	A major	Allegro	
370	316	346	–	E♭ major	Allegro	
371	17	264	–	E♭ major	Allegro	
372	302	402	168	G major	Allegro	
373	98	158	–	G minor	Presto e fugato	
374	76	472	–	G major	Andante	
375	389	414	–	G major	Allegro	
376	34	246	–	B minor	Allegro	
377	263	245	124	B minor	Allegrissimo	
378	276	347	99	F major	Allegro	
379	73	107	–	F major	Minuet	
380	23	483	100	E major	Andante comodo	
381	225	323	92	E major	Allegro	
382	S33	508	–	A minor	Allegro	
383	134	269	–	A minor	Allegro	
384	2	487	–	C major	Cantabile andante	
385	284	220	–	C major	Allegro	
386	171	137	164	F minor	Presto	
387	175	415	163	F minor	Veloce e fugato	
388	414	370	–	D major	Presto	
389	482	331	–	D major	Allegro	
390	234	348	–	G major	Allegro	
391	79	364	–	G major	Allegro	
392	246	371	–	B♭ major	Allegro	
393	74	326	–	B♭ major	Minuet	
394	275	349	–	E minor	Allegro	
395	65	273	–	E major	Allegro	
396	110	435	–	D minor	Andante	
397	208	325	–	D major	Minuet	
398	218	493	69	C major	Andante	
399	274	458	–	C major	Allegro	
400	213	228	86	D major	Allegro	
401	365	436	–	D major	Allegro	
402	427	496	–	E minor	Andante	
403	470	437	–	E major	Allegro	
404	222	489	–	A major	Andante	
405	43	438	–	A major	Allegro	
406	5	509	–	C major	Allegro	
407	S4	521	–	C major	Allegro	
408	346	350	–	B minor	Andante	
409	150	403	–	B minor	Allegro	
410	S43	372	–	B♭ major	Allegro	
411	69	351	–	B♭ major	Allegro	
412	182	463	–	G major	Allegro	
413	125	416	–	G major	Allegro	
414	310	373	–	D major	Allegro	
415	S11	175	–	D major	Pastoral Allegro	
416	149	454	–	D major	Presto	
417	462	40	–	D minor	Allegro moderato	
418	26	510	–	F major	Allegro	
419	279	524	–	F major	Piu tosto presto che allegro	
420	S2	352	169	C major	Allegro	
421	252	459	170	C major	Allegro	
422	451	511	141	C major	Allegro	
423	102	455	143	C major	Presto	
424	289	374	142	G major	Allegro	
425	333	426	144	G major	Allegro molto	
426	128	500	45	G minor	Andante	
427	286	464	145	G major	Presto quanto sia possibile	
428	131	353	46	A major	Allegro	
429	132	439	47	A major	Allegro	
430	463	329	50	D major	Non presto ma a tempo di ballo	
431	83	365	–	G major	Allegro	
432	288	465	171	G major	Allegro	
433	453	440	172	G major	Vivo	
434	343	498	176	D minor	Andante	
435	361	466	174	D major	Allegro	
436	109	404	–	D major	Allegro	
437	278	499	139	F major	Andante comodo	
438	381	467	140	F major	Allegro	
439	47	473	–	B♭ major	Moderato	
440	97	328	–	B♭ major	Minuet	
441	S39	375	146	B♭ major	Allegro	
442	319	229	147	B♭ major	Allegro	
443	418	376	148	D major	Allegro	
444	420	441	149	D minor	Allegrissimo	
445	385	468	150	F major	Allegro o presto	
446	433	177	72	F major	Pastorale Allegrissimo	
447	294	191	151	F♯ minor	Allegro	
448	485	261	152	F♯ minor	Allegro	
449	444	405	153	G major	Allegro	
450	338	422	44	G minor	Allegrissimo	
451	243	366	103	A minor	Allegro	
452	–	195	–	A major	Andante allegro	
453	–	280	–	A major	Andante	
454	184	423	154	G major	Andante spirituoso	
455	209	354	155	G major	Allegro	
456	491	377	156	A major	Allegro	
457	292	442	157	A major	Allegro	
458	212	260	43	D major	Allegro	
459	S14	167	–	D minor/major	Allegro	
460	324	378	158	C major	Allegro	
461	8	324	–	C major	Allegro	
462	438	474	95	F minor	Andante	
463	471	512	96	F minor	Molto allegro	
464	151	460	–	C major	Allegro	
465	242	406	159	C major	Allegro	
466	118	501	–	F minor	Andante moderato	
467	476	513	–	F minor	Allegrissimo	
468	226	507	41	F major	Allegro	
469	431	514	73	F major	Allegro molto	
470	304	379	–	G major	Allegro	
471	82	327	–	G major	Minuet	
472	99	475	–	B♭ major	Andante	
473	229	355	–	B♭ major	Allegro molto	
474	203	502	37	E♭ major	Andante cantabile	
475	220	319	97	E♭ major	Allegrissimo	
476	340	427	38	G minor	Allegro	
477	290	419	70	G major	Allegrissimo	
478	12	503	–	D major	Andante cantabile	
479	S16	380	–	D major	Allegrissimo	
480	S8	381	–	D major	Presto	
481	187	504	39	F minor	Andante cantabile	
482	435	356	40	F major	Allegrissimo	
483	472	407	42	F major	Presto	
484	419	428	–	D major	Allegro	
485	153	490	–	C major	Andante cantabile	
486	455	515	–	C major	Allegro	
487	205	421	55	C major	Allegro	
488	S37	382	–	B♭ major	Allegro	
489	S41	522	–	B♭ major	Allegro	
490	206	476	91	D major	Cantabile	
491	164	484	–	D major	Allegro	
492	14	443	–	D major	Presto	
493	S24	383	–	G major	Allegro	
494	287	444	–	G major	Allegro	
495	426	384	–	E major	Allegro	
496	372	332	–	E major	Allegro	
497	146	357	–	B minor	Allegro	
498	350	367	–	B minor	Allegro	
499	193	477	–	A major	Andante	
500	492	358	–	A major	Allegro	
501	137	385	–	C major	Allegretto	
502	3	408	–	C major	Allegro	
503	196	196	–	B♭ major	Allegretto	
504	29	265	–	B♭ major	Allegro	
505	326	386	–	F major	Allegro non presto	
506	70	409	–	F major	Allegro	
507	113	478	–	E♭ major	Andantino cantabile	
508	19	516	–	E♭ major	Allegro	
509	311	387	–	D major	Allegro	
510	277	525	–	D minor	Allegro molto	
511	314	388	–	D major	Allegro	
512	339	359	–	D major	Allegro	
513	S3	176	–	C major	Moderato e Molto allegro – Presto	
514	1	389	–	C major	Allegro	
515	255	417	–	C major	Allegro	
516	S12	523	–	D minor	Allegretto	
517	266	517	190	D minor	Prestissimo	
518	116	390	–	F major	Allegro	
519	475	445	189	F minor	Allegro assai	
520	86	362	–	G major	Allegretto	
521	408	429	–	G major	Allegro	
522	S25	526	–	G major	Allegro	
523	490	527	197	G major	Allegro	
524	283	528	–	F major	Allegro	
525	188	529	194	F major	Allegro	
526	456	530	193	C minor	Allegro comodo	
527	458	531	–	C major	Allegro assai	
528	200	532	–	B♭ major	Allegro	
529	327	533	188	B♭ major	Allegro	
530	44	534	–	E major	Allegro	
531	430	535	67	E major	Allegro	
532	223	536	187	A minor	Allegro	
533	395	537	186	A major	Allegro assai	
534	11	538	–	D major	Cantabile	
535	262	539	185	D major	Allegro	
536	236	540	–	A major	Cantabile	
537	293	541	–	A major	Prestissimo	
538	254	542	–	G major	Allegretto	
539	121	543	–	G major	Allegro	
540	S17	544	–	F major	Allegretto	
541	120	545	–	F major	Allegretto	
542	167	546	–	F major	Allegretto	
543	227	547	–	F major	Allegro	
544	497	548	–	B♭ major	Cantabile	
545	500	549	–	B♭ major	Prestissimo	
546	312	550	–	G minor	Cantabile	
547	S28	551	–	G major	Allegro	
548	404	552	–	C major	Allegretto	
549	S1	553	–	C major	Allegro	
550	S42	554	–	B♭ major	Allegretto	
551	396	555	184	B♭ major	Allegro	
552	421	556	–	D minor	Allegretto	
553	425	557	183	D minor	Allegro	
554	S21	558	–	F major	Allegretto	
555	477	559	–	F minor	Allegro	
–	–	–	–	A major, 3/8 (Note: Transcribed in a manuscript as Cary 703, in the Morgan Library & Museum, New York)	–	
–	–	–	–	A major, 4/4 (Note: known from a Portuguese source as well; Cary 703, in the Morgan Library & Museum, New York)	–	

Music Archive of the Cathedrals of Saragossa [E-Zac]	Y : Yáñez	Key
B-2 Ms.31	Y.1.	B♭ major
B-2 Ms.31	Y.2.	C major
B-2 Ms.31	Y.3.	D major
B-2 Ms.31	Y.4.	G major
A-1 Ms.1	Y.5.	G major
A-1 Ms.1	Y.6.	G minor

See: Yanez Navarro, Celestino: Nuevas aportaciones para el estudio de las sonatas de Domenico Scarlatti. Los manuscritos del Archivo de música de las Catedrales de Zaragoza. Tesis doctoral, Universidad Autónoma de Barcelona, 2015.

== See also ==
- Barbara of Portugal: a Portuguese infanta and Scarlatti's only pupil during the time the Sonatas originated. She was skilled both as keyboard player and, in politics, as the Queen of Spain. The harpsichordist/scholar Ralph Kirkpatrick offered a theory, perhaps tongue-in-cheek, that Barbara was the true author of the Sonatas.
