= Giovanni Bolzoni (composer) =

Italian composer and violinist

Giovanni Bolzoni (15 May 1841 – 21 February 1919) was an Italian composer and violinist, who is known for his Minuet for String Orchestra.

== Life and career ==
Born in Parma, Bolzoni studied at the Parma Conservatory. After graduating in 1859, he was violinist and part-time conductor with Teatro Comunale di Reggio Emilia and Comunale di Cremona, eventually taking a position in Savona where he also taught violin. After six years he became its concertmaster and conductor. This was followed in 1874 by three years in Perugia as orchestral conductor and theatre director at the Istituto Morlacchi. In 1887, he became director of the Istituto Musicale, concertmaster at the Teatro Regio di Parma and of the Concerti Popolari.

Bolzoni was the long-time director of the Turin Conservatory. Among his notable pupils were composers Carlo Adolfo Cantù and Edgard Varèse.

In 1884, he conducted the premiere of the revised version of Puccini's opera Le Villi.

Bolzoni died in Turin, aged 77.

== Compositions ==
Besides the popular Minuet, Bolzoni composed the operas Il matrimonio civile (premiered in Parma, 1870), La stella delle Alpi (Savona, 1876), and Jella (Piacenza, 1881). He also wrote Tema con variazioni for string orchestra, Al castello medioevale for small orchestra, a string quartet, quartets, quintets, and violin pieces.

== Recordings ==
Arturo Toscanini performed some of Bolzoni's music; two 1943 performances with the NBC Symphony Orchestra have been preserved on disc. In 1958, Arthur Fiedler and the Boston Pops Orchestra recorded Bolzoni's Minuet for RCA Victor as part of the Boston Tea Party album, which was later issued on CD. The work has also been recorded by Frederick Fennell and the London Pops Orchestra for Mercury Records and Neeme Järvi and the Detroit Symphony Orchestra for Chandos Records.
