= Arturo Vigna =

Italian conductor

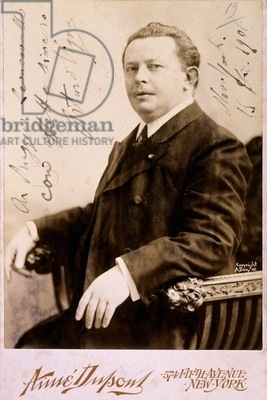
Arturo Vigna, 1905

Arturo Vigna (1863, Turin - 30 January 1927, Milan) was an Italian opera conductor who was particularly associated with the operas of Giuseppe Verdi.

== Life and career ==
Born in Turin, Vigna was trained at the Turin Conservatory. He served as music director of the Opéra de Monte-Carlo from 1895 to 1903. He then worked as a conductor at the Metropolitan Opera in New York City where he conducted nearly 250 performances from 1903 to 1907.

At the Met, he notably conducted the United States premieres of Umberto Giordano's Fedora and Hector Berlioz's La damnation de Faust in 1906. He also conducted the Met's first performances of Donizetti's L'elisir d'amore and Lucrezia Borgia in 1904, and the Met's first performances of Manon Lescaut and Madama Butterfly in 1907, both of them supervised by Puccini. He also led performances of new productions of Verdi's Aida, Donizetti's Don Pasquale, Ponchielli's La Gioconda, Bellini's La sonnambula, Meyerbeer's L'Africaine, Verdi's Rigoletto at the Met.

From 1917 to 1922 Vigna was a conductor with the Paris Opera. He also conducted operas in Bergamo, Berlin, Dresden, Madrid, Prague, and Trieste during his career. He died at the age of 63 in Milan.
