= Pierluigi Cimma =

Italian composer, lutenist, guitarist, and teacher

Pierluigi Cimma or Pier Luigi Cimma (19 August 1941 – 31 July 2006) was an Italian composer, lutenist, guitarist and teacher.

Cimma was born in Turin. He was the longtime chairman of the guitar department at the Conservatorio Statale di Musica Giuseppe Verdi, and the founder of the Bardonecchia Guitar Festival. His works had been published by Edizioni Berben.

He was a student of Andrés Segovia. His own students included Gabriella Perugini, Roman Turovsky, Massimo Moscardo, Salvatore Gullace, Fabio Rizza and Massimo Riva
