= Riccardo Malipiero =

Italian composer (1914–2003)

Riccardo Malipiero Jr. (24 July 1914 – 27 November 2003) was an Italian composer, pianist, critic, and music educator. He was awarded the gold medal by the city of Milan in 1977 and by the city of Varese in 1984.

Born in Milan, Malipiero was the son of cellist Riccardo Malipiero (1886–1975). He studied piano and composition at Milan Conservatory (in 1930), where he graduated in 1932, and Turin Conservatory, where he obtained a diploma in 1937. He pursued further studies in composition with his uncle Gian Francesco Malipiero in Venice. From 1935 to 1947 he was a lecturer at the Liceo Musicale "Vincenzo Appiani" in Monza.

Malipiero was active as a pianist, and also wrote criticism for Il popolo and Corriere lombardo, from 1945 to 1966. He lectured in the United States in 1954, 1959, and 1969, and in Buenos Aires in 1963. Between 1969 and 1984 he directed the Varese Conservatory, in which he joined the music faculty in 1979.

Malipiero's early works were composed using a free atonality. In 1945 he began using a twelve-tone technique in his compositions, becoming one of the pioneers of that technique in Italy. He promoted the twelve-tone technique in articles he contributed in Italian music periodicals, books, and lectures. In 1949 he organized the First Congress of twelve-tone music in Milan which was attended by such important composers as John Cage, Luigi Dallapiccola, Karl Amadeus Hartmann, René Leibowitz, Bruno Maderna, and Camillo Togni. In 1969 he represented Italy at UNESCO's 7th Congress in Moscow.

Malipiero died in Milan in 2003 at the age of 89.
