= Giuseppe Pietro Bagetti =

Italian painter

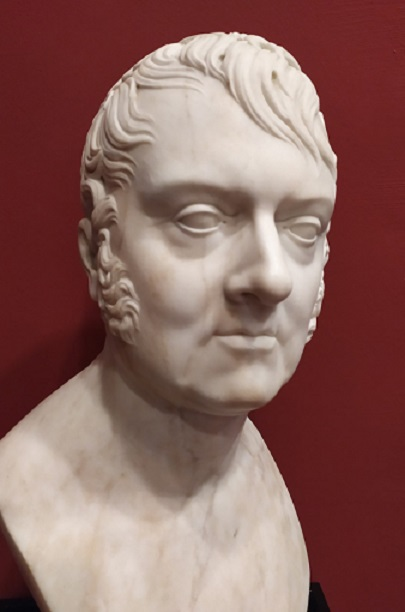
Bust by Giacomo Spalla at the Accademia Albertina

Giuseppe Pietro Bagetti (14 April 1764 – 29 April 1831) was an Italian civil and military architect, as well as painter. He painted landscapes and battle paintings.

== Biography ==
He was born in Turin. He initially studied music at the Turin Conservatory under Bernardino Ottani, and learned painting from Pietro Giacomo Palmieri (1737–1804). Bagetti was named an architect in 1782 for the Royal University, and began and paint watercolor vedute of coastal locations. In 1792, he began to teach topographic design at the Royal Academy. In 1792, he painted two battle scenes from the recent war between the kingdom of Sardinia and the French Republic: the Veduta di Saorgio and the Veduta del campo di Brois nel contado di Nizza. In 1793, King Vittorio Amedeo III named him designer of vedute e paesi for the kingdom. He was affiliated with the Artillery Corps.

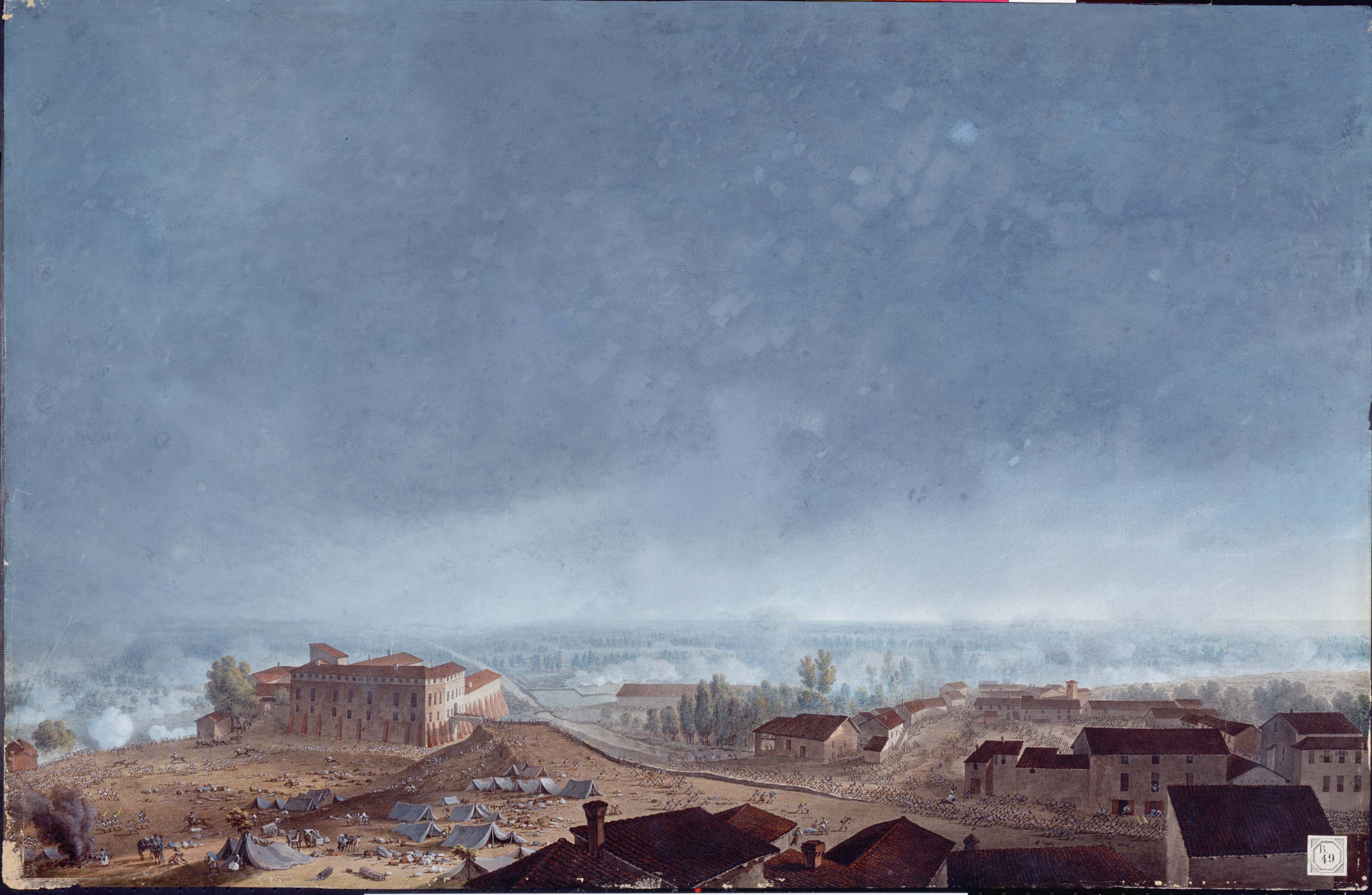
Battle of Fombio by Bagetti

In 1798, he traveled to Paris. He continued the same work for the Napoleonic rulers, including battle plans at the Battle of Marengo, travelling with the French army through Northern Italy, and later in Germany and Russia. From 1807 to 1815, he was a geographic engineer for the Napoleonic government. He was awarded the Legion of Honor medal for his Veduta d’Italia dalle Alpi.

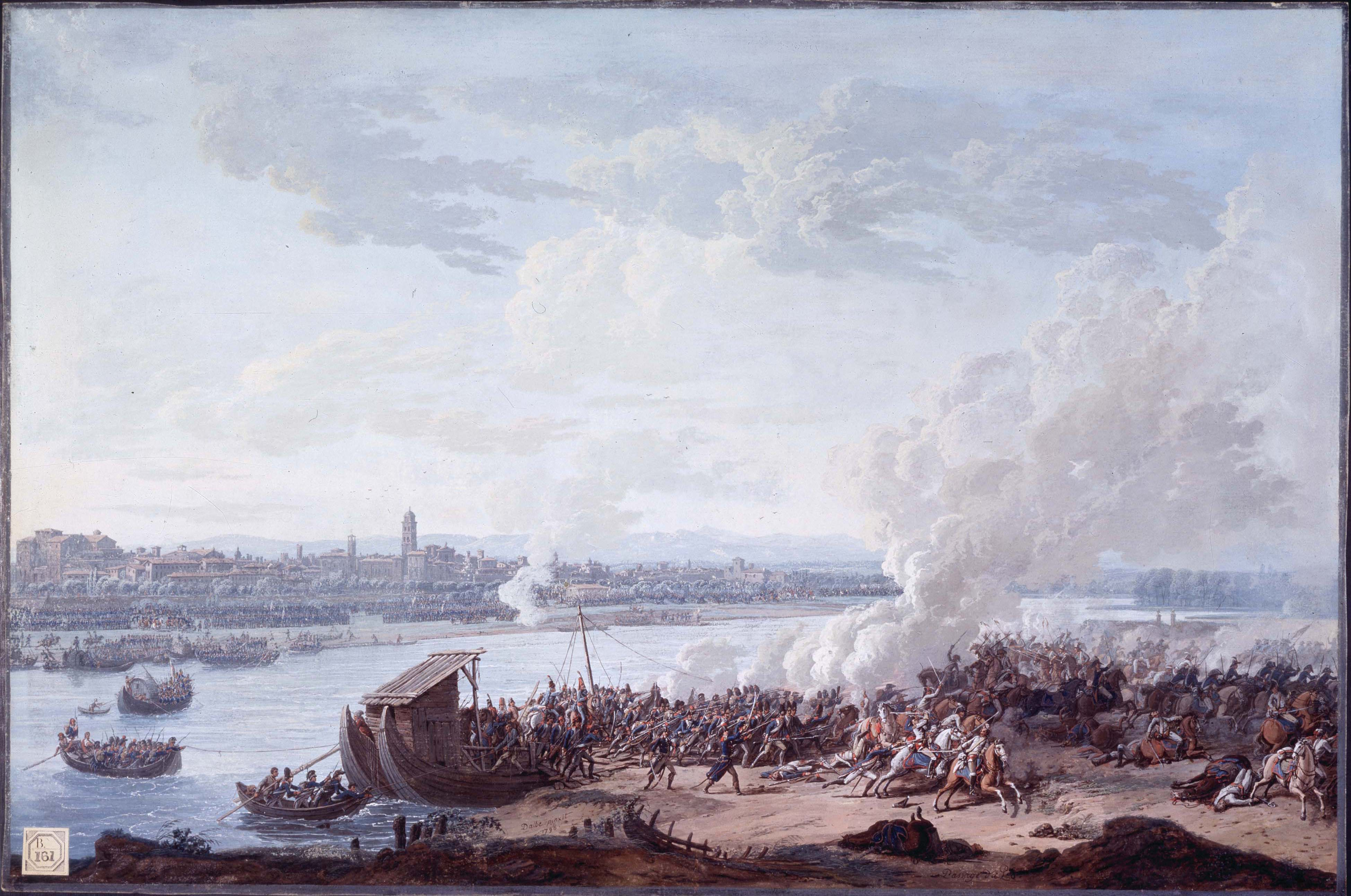
The French Pass the River Po at Piacenza, by Giuseppe Pietro Bagetti, 1803

With the fall of Napoleon, he regained his post as professor at the Royal Academy of Fine Arts (Albertina Academy) and celebrated the return of the House of Savoy with paintings depicting The May 20, 1814 Entry into Turin of Vittorio Emanuele I and The August 22, 1815 entry of Queen Maria Teresa to the Port of Genoa. He went on to paint for the Royal Palace, thirty-two paintings of battles, many depicting events of the First Campaign in Italy by Napoleon, including the Battle of Carassone. Following a commission by Duke of Genoa, and future King of Sardinia Carlo Felice in 1820, Bagetti also painted several fictional landscapes. In these works, he displayed his capacity to represent in great details natural phenomena, including their botanical and geological features. He was knighted into the Order of Saints Maurice and Lazarus and the Order of Savoy by the Italian monarchs. Among those engravers he influenced were Giovanni Battista de Gubernatis. He died in Turin on 29 April 1831.
