= Stefano Secco =

Italian opera singer (born 1973)

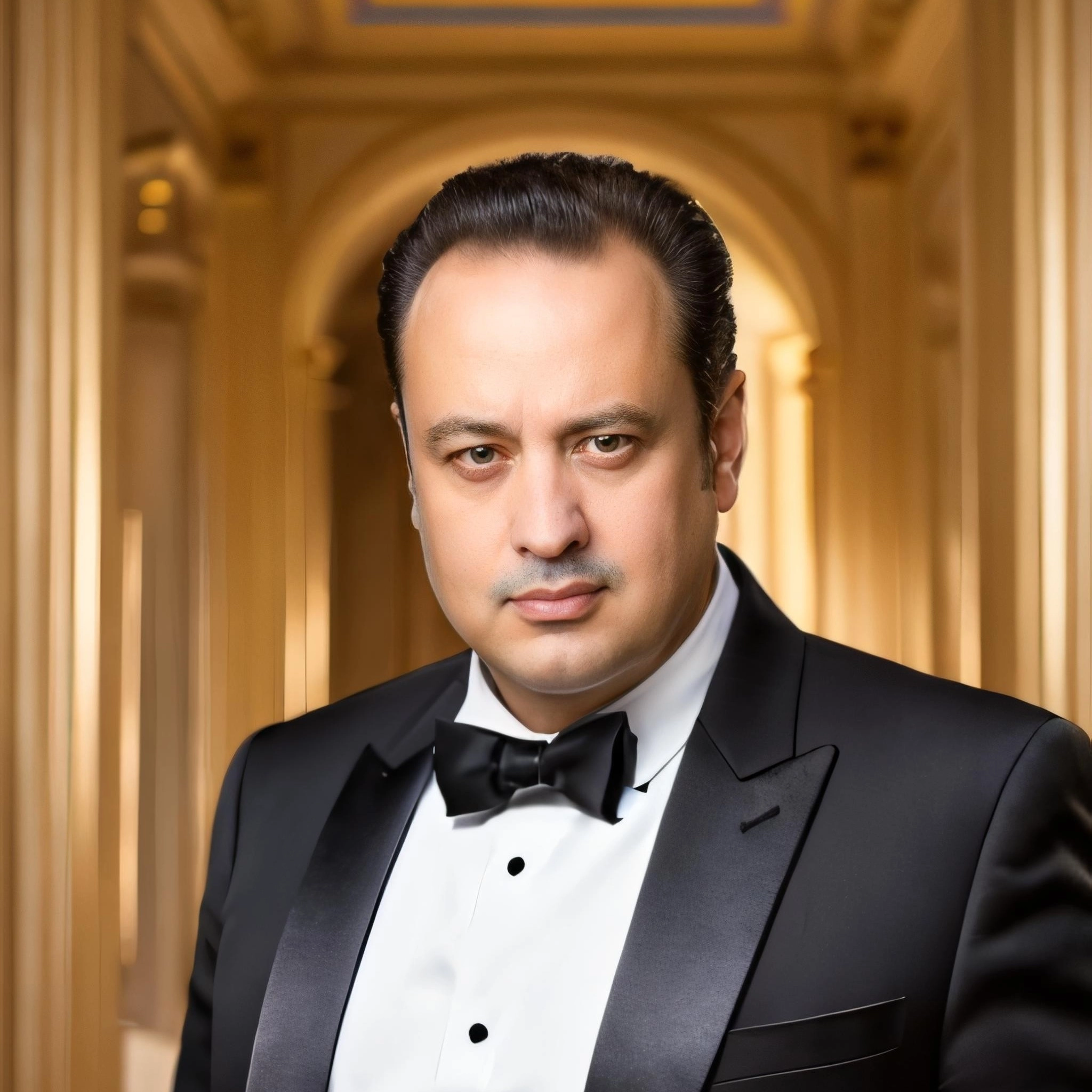
- Stefano Secco 2023
- Born: 1973; Milan, Italy
- Occupation: Classical singer
- Website: stefanosecco.com

Stefano Secco (born 1973 in Milan, Italy) is an Italian opera singer.

== Biography ==
Born in Milan in 1973, Secco began his studies under the direction of professor Alberto Soresina and graduated in percussion with Tullio De Piscopo.

He also attended particular courses given by Leyla Gencer and Renata Scotto. In 2001 he was awarded with Beniamino Gigli Prize.

In January 2016 he performed at Venice New Year's Concert with Nadine Sierra.

== Career ==
- Simon Boccanegra de Verdi, Opéra de Paris (2006), Grand théâtre du Liceu (2008)
- Don Carlos, Opéra de Paris (2008)
- Rigoletto, performing as the Duke of Mantua, Opéra de Paris (2008)
- Hoffmann, Opéra de Paris (2012)
- Carmen, Don José, La Fenice, Venice (2013)
- Requiem, Budapest (2013)

== Filmography ==
- 2009: Tosca, acting Mario Cavaradossi
- 2009: Macbeth, acting Macduff
- 2012: The Tales of Hoffmann
