= Mira Sulpizi =

Italian composer

Mira Pratesi Sulpizi (born 28 December 1923) is an Italian composer who is best known for her works for guitar.

Sulpizi was born in Milan. She studied composition with Alberto Soresina at the Universita Cattolica del Sacro Cuore. Her music is published by Casa Ricordi under the names Mira Pratesi and Mira Sulpizi. Her compositions include:

== Chamber ==
- Ballatelle (flute & guitar)
- Canzoncelle Napoletane (flute & guitar)
- Eight Medieval Songs (guitar)
- New Airs and Dances for Young Guitarists
- Organ Sonata
- Songs of Hope: Five Hebrew Songs (harp)
- Wedding Songs: Six Hebrew Melodies (harp)

== Piano ==
- Introduzione-Aria-Finale
- Sonata Breve

== Vocal ==
- Ancient Spanish Songs
- “Caterina Dei Corai”
- Italian Nursery Rhymes (boys’ choir, flute, guitar and percussion)
- “Lyrics” (text by Langston Hughes)
- Messa Melodica
- “Pentecost Eve”
- Three Lyrics (text by G. Azzi)
- Two Rispetti Toscani
