= Carlo Adolfo Cantù =

Italian composer

Carlo Adolfo Cantù (21 January 1875 in Turin - 1942) was an Italian composer. He studied music composition at the Turin Conservatory with Giovanni Bolzoni and is best known for his opera Ettore Fieramosca which premiered at the Teatro Regio in Turin in 1921. Cantù was also active as a pianist, performing at a concert held on 6 September 1911 in the Pavilion of Festivals and Concerts at the Turin International Exposition.
