= Elio Battaglia =

Italian opera singer (1933–2024)

Elio Battaglia (3 November 1933 – 23 August 2024) was an Italian baritone, singing teacher, and author and lecturer in music. He was the founder and director of the course entitled, Il Lied Tedesco ("German Song"), which ran in Acquasparta, Italy, from 1973 to 2005, and then in Turin from 2007 to 2008.

== Early life and education ==
Battaglia was born in Palermo, Italy on 3 November 1933. He was educated at the schools of Adami Corradetti and Erik Werba, before earning a diploma in singing from the Benedetto Marcello conservatoire in Venice. He then went on to study for a Doctorate in Lieder and Oratorio from University of Music and Performing Arts in Vienna.

== Career ==
Battaglia is most renowned as a singing teacher, of opera, oratorio and art song, and was the first Italian teacher to specialise in German Lieder. In 2004, he gave master classes at the Music Academy of the West in Montecito, California, hosted by Marilyn Horne. Across Europe, his master classes have been hosted by institutions including the Accademia Musicale Pescarese since 1984 and the Mozarteum since 1993. Between 1967 and 1997, he taught singing at the Conservatorio Statale di Musica Giuseppe Verdi in Turin.

He gave advanced master classes and courses in universities and conservatoires internationally, including in the United States, the former USSR, China, Japan, Korea and Europe. In Italy he organised and held advanced vocal courses and seminars in Turin, (Teatro Regio, Conservatorio G.Verdi), Sienna (Accademia Chigiana), Parma (Festival Verdi), Rome (Università La Sapienza), Tolentino (Teatro Vaccaj), Napoli (Conservatorio S.Pietro a Majella), Catania (Istituto Bellini), and Milan (Conservatorio G.Verdi). He was often invited to sit on judging panels in international competitions such as the Hugo Wolf International Lied Competition in Vienna, Austria and Stuttgart, Germany, and was, in 2005, the jury chairman for the 2005 Renata Tebaldi Competition in San Marino.

As an author, he wrote many essays and articles regarding vocal art and edited the new teachers' edition of The Practical Method of Italian Singing by Nicola Vaccai. He also edited an Anthology of the German Lieder.

Battaglia was often considered to be a world leader in singing teaching and an expert regarding the works of Hugo Wolf. Italian music critic and author Massimo Mila (who writes for La Stampa and l'Unità) wrote of Maestro Battaglia: "...thanks to his passionate teaching style and large numbers of resident students, he has almost turned the Turin Conservatory into a branch office of the Vienna University of Music and Dramatic Art."

Battaglia's teaching was so influential that for the 1991–1992 opera season's opening night at Teatro Regio in Turin, conductor Maurizio Benini cast Humperdinck's Hansel and Gretel entirely from Battaglia's studio of singers. No event like this had ever happened before in Italy.

In 1987, he was awarded the Hugo Wolf Medal from the International Hugo Wolf Society of Vienna for his artistic achievements.

== Death ==
Battaglia died on 23 August 2024, at the age of 90.

== Sources ==
- Bach-cantatas.com, Elio Battaglia (Baritone)
- The Lieder Sound Archive, Elio Battaglia – baritono (in Italian)
