= Cassioli =

Cassioli is an Italian surname. Notable people with the surname include:

- Amos Cassioli (1832–1891), Italian painter
- Giuseppe Cassioli (1865–1942), Italian painter and sculptor, son of Amos

== See also ==
- Cascioli
