= Guido M. Gatti =

Guido Maggiorino Gatti (1892–1973) was an Italian musicologist, editor, administrator, and music critic. In 1920 he founded the journal Il Pianoforte, which later became La Rassegna Musicale in 1928 and Quaderni della Rassegna musicale in 1962. In 1972 he founded the journal Studi musicali. He was music critic for Tempo from 1951-1969, and also as an administrator for various performing arts institutions in Italy.

== Life and career ==
Guido Maggiorino Gatti was born on May 30, 1892 in Chieti, Italy. He began studying the violin at age six and the piano at the age of twelve. After completing high school in Chieti, he matriculated to the University of Turin in 1909. He completed his degree at that school in 1914. He began his career as an editor while a student; working as the editor-in-chief of La Riforma musicale from 1913-1915.

Gatti published a monograph] on Georges Bizet in 1915, and later published a second monograph on Ildebrando Pizzetti in 1934. He wrote the opera libretti for Giorgio Federico Ghedini's Gringoire (1915, unperformed) and Vincenzo Davico's La dogaressa (1919, Opéra de Monte-Carlo). He contributed a series of published articles on mainly living composers of his day that was published in La critica musicale from 1918 through 1920. These articles were known collectively as Musicisti stranieri (later re-named Musicisti contemporanei) with publications on Franco Alfano, Georges Bizet, Ernest Bloch, Alfredo Casella, Mario Castelnuovo-Tedesco, Claude Debussy, Eugene Goossens, Gabriel Grovlez, John Ireland, Gian Francesco Malipiero, Luigi Perrachio, and Ildebrando Pizzetti. These were followed by a book along this same theme Musicisti moderni d'Italia e di fuori (1920, Bologna).

In 1920 Gatti founded the journal Il Pianoforte which later became La Rassegna Musicale in 1928. The journal later changed names a second time in 1962 to Quaderni della Rassegna musicale. He was also editor of the journal Rivista musicale italiana which sponsored the first Congresso Italiano di Musica; holding that event in Turin in 1921. He also contributed to several Italian musical encyclopedias and other reference works. With the musicologist Andrea Della Corte he co-authored the music reference work Dizionario di musica (1930, Turin). He was also a contributor the Grove Dictionary of Music and Musicians (under the initials G.M.G.), 1954 (fifth) edition.

From 1925 through 1931 Gatti was general director of the Teatro Regio in Turin. In 1933 he served as secretary-general of the Maggio Musicale Fiorentino's first festival, and was secretary-general of first International Congress of Music (ICM) which was held in Florence. He subsequently served in that same capacity for ICM events in 1935 and 1936. From 1934 through 1966 he worked as an administrator at Lux Film; from 1946-1950 he was music editor of the Dizionario letterario Bompiani delle opere e dei personaggi; from 1951 through 1969 he worked as music critic for Tempo; and from 1966 through 1971 he was editor of Basso, of La musica. He also was an Italy based music correspondent for The New York Times.

Gatti also held positions with several academic organizations. He was president of the Accademia Filarmonica Romana from 1953-1955; vice-president of the Accademia Nazionale di Santa Cecilia from 1966 through 1972, and president of the Società Aquilana dei Concerti from 1969 through 1973. In 1956 he was awarded a gold medal from Italy's Ministry of Public Education.

Guido M. Gatti died in Rome on May 10, 1973.

His wife was noted harpist Clelia Gatti Aldrovandi.
