= Giovanni Battista de Gubernatis =

Italian painter

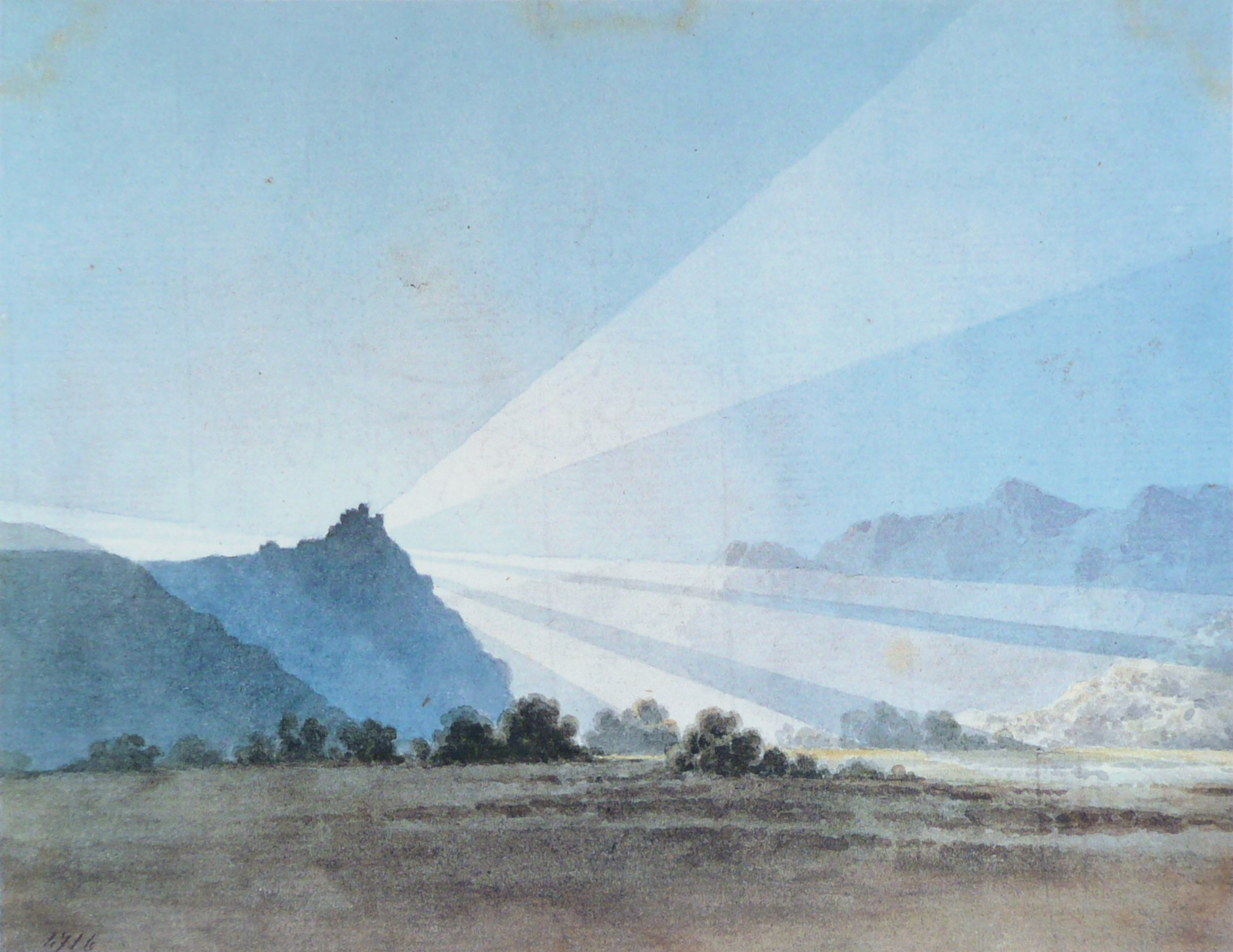
Sacra di San Michele at sunset

Giovanni Battista de Gubernatis (1774 – 1837) was an Italian bureaucrat active for the Piedmontese monarchy, but known best as an engraver and water color painter of city- and landscapes.

== Biography ==
He was born in Vercelli, and appears to have begun a career as a Piedmontese bureaucrat, and adopted painting and engraving as a hobby. He was not educated in the official art academies, but his early work shows the influence of the Piedmontese Pietro Giacomo Palmieri (1737–1804) and Giuseppe Pietro Bagetti, as well as watercolor and aquaforte artists from England. In 1805, he traveled to Paris. During 1806–1812, he was sent by the Napoleonic administration to document vedute of the occupied Duchy of Parma. From 1812 to 1815, he traveled to Provence in Frances. Returning to Piedmont, he became attached to the Savoyard monarchy as a secretary, and continued travels allowed him to paint views in Liguria, Nice, and Castiglione. On his death, he endowed the city of Turin with many of his paintings and designs.
