= 9902 Kirkpatrick =

Asteroid

- Orbit of Kirkpatrick (blue), with the inner planets and Jupiter (outermost)

Discovery
- Discovered by: P. G. Comba
- Discovery site: Prescott Obs.
- Discovery date: 3 July 1997

Designations
- Named after: Ralph Kirkpatrick (musician, musicologist)
- Alternative designations: 1997 NY · 1988 XS_{4} 1994 RK_{29} · 1996 EJ_{16}
- Minor planet category: main-belt · (inner); Flora

Orbital characteristics
- Epoch 4 September 2017 (JD 2458000.5)
- Uncertainty parameter 0
- Observation arc: 28.48 yr (10,401 days)
- Aphelion: 2.3935 AU
- Perihelion: 2.0276 AU
- Semi-major axis: 2.2105 AU
- Eccentricity: 0.0828
- Orbital period (sidereal): 3.29 yr (1,200 days)
- Mean anomaly: 254.92°
- Mean motion: 0° 17^{m} 59.64^{s} / day
- Inclination: 5.3167°
- Longitude of ascending node: 274.37°
- Argument of perihelion: 176.19°

Physical characteristics
- Dimensions: 3.611±0.166 km 17.8 km
- Geometric albedo: 0.179±0.022
- Absolute magnitude (H): 14.4

9902 Kirkpatrick, provisional designation 1997 NY, is a Florian asteroid from the inner regions of the asteroid belt, approximately 4 kilometers in diameter. The asteroid was discovered on 3 July 1997, by American amateur astronomer Paul Comba at Prescott Observatory in Arizona, United States, and named after American musician Ralph Kirkpatrick.

== Orbit and classification ==
Kirkpatrick is a member of the Flora family. It orbits the Sun in the inner main-belt at a distance of 2.0–2.4 AU once every 3 years and 3 months (1,200 days). Its orbit has an eccentricity of 0.08 and an inclination of 5° with respect to the ecliptic. It was first identified as 1988 XS_{4} at El Leoncito in 1988, extending the asteroid's observation arc by 9 years prior to its official discovery at Prescott.

== Physical characteristics ==
=== Rotation period ===
As of 2017, the asteroid's rotation period and shape remain unknown.

=== Diameter and albedo ===
According to the surveys carried out by the Infrared Astronomical Satellite IRAS and NASA's Wide-field Infrared Survey Explorer with its subsequent NEOWISE mission, Kirkpatrick measures 17.8 and 3.611 kilometers in diameter, respectively. WISE/NEOWISE also gives an albedo of 0.179 for the body's surface. It has an absolute magnitude of 14.4.

== Naming ==
This minor planet was named after Ralph Kirkpatrick (1911–1984), an American musician, musicologist and harpsichordist. He has written a biography of Domenico Scarlatti and published a chronological catalog of his keyboard sonatas (also see 6480 Scarlatti). Kirkpatrick studied 17th and 18th century performance practices in chamber music and gave concerts playing the works by Scarlatti and Bach (also see 1814 Bach). The official naming citation was published by the Minor Planet Center on 2 April 1999 (M.P.C. 34356).
