= Barone Canavese Castle =

Castle in Piedmont, Italy

- Castello di Barone Canavese
- Barone Canavese, Piedmont, Italy

Site information
- Type: Castle

Location
- Location in Italy
- Coordinates: 45°19′41.7″N 7°52′13″E

Barone Canavese Castle (Italian: Castello di Barone Canavese) is a castle located in Barone Canavese, Piedmont, Italy.

== History ==
The castle dates back to the Middle Ages but was rebuilt in its current Baroque form in the 18th century by the Valperga family. Construction works, which began in 1772 and were completed in 1774, were entrusted to architect Costanzo Michela of Agliè, a former collaborator of Filippo Juvarra. However, it seems that only part of the original project was carried out, likely due to a lack of funds.

The building was restored by engineer Paolo Derossi in the 1950s and is still owned by the Derossi family.

== Description ==
The castle stands in a panoramic position on a hill overlooking the village of Barone Canavese. Its brick-clad facades reflect the aesthetic principles of the Baroque style. The structure extends over three floors, two of which are connected by a monumental central elliptical staircase.

The central floor features a large circular hall, from which three square-shaped rooms can be accessed. One of these rooms preserves an intact and beautiful 18th-century fresco with distinctive wax decorations.
