= Cat fugue =

Harpsichord sonata by Domenico Scarlatti

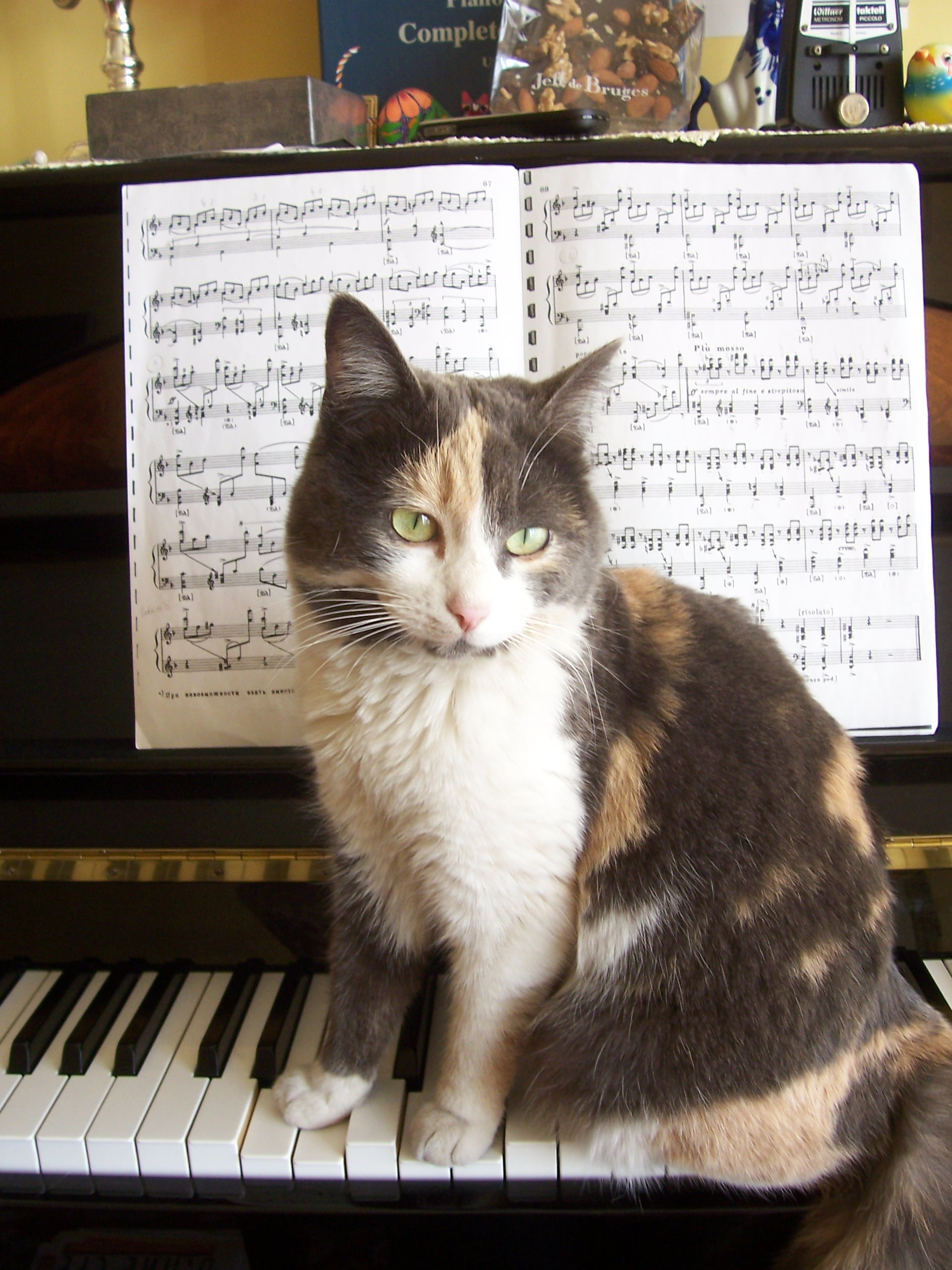
A cat sitting on the modern piano

The Fugue in G minor (K. 30, L. 499) by Domenico Scarlatti is a single-movement sonata for harpsichord, popularly known as the Cat fugue or Cat's fugue (in Italian: Fuga del gatto) because, according to a legend, Scarlatti was inspired by his cat walking on the harpsichord keyboard.

Sonata K. 30 ("Cat Fugue")
Recorded by John Sankey on a MIDI harpsichord

== History of the nickname ==
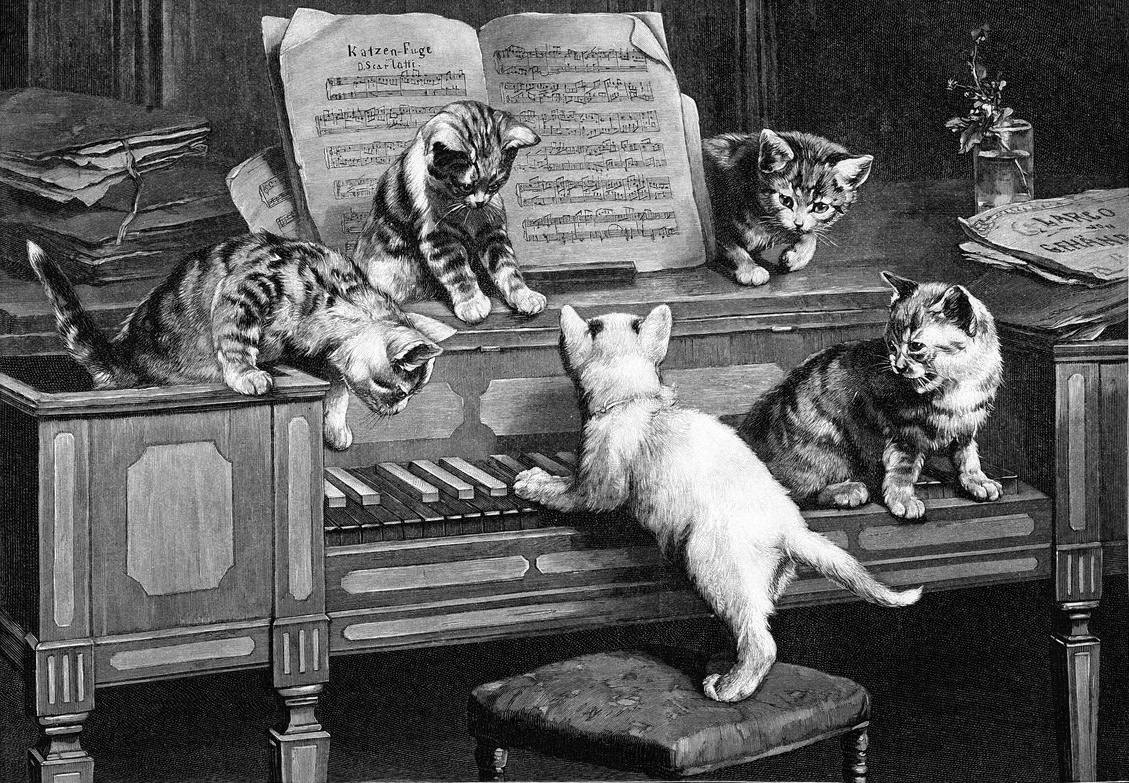
Carl Reichert, Katzenfuge (engraving, 1870)

The nickname, which was never used by the composer himself but was introduced only early in the 19th century, originates from a story about how Scarlatti came up with the strikingly unusual motif on which the fugue is built. Legend has it that Scarlatti had a pet cat called Pulcinella, who was described by the composer as prone to walking across the keyboard, always curious about its sounds.

On one occasion, according to the story, Scarlatti wrote down a phrase from one of these "improvisation sessions", and used it as a lead motif in a fugue:

The nickname was used in concert programmes in the 19th century (see Performances section below), and was also used by publishers including Muzio Clementi, Carl Czerny and Alessandro Longo.

== Influence ==
The piece was published in London in 1739. George Frideric Handel, famous for his reuse of his own music and borrowings from the works of others, wrote his Concerti grossi, Op. 6 between late September and late October 1739 and the strange descending intervals of the second movement of No. 3 are reminiscent of Scarlatti's piece.

Early 19th-century theorist and composer Anton Reicha knew the work and wrote a fugue on the same subject for his 36 Fugues of 1803.

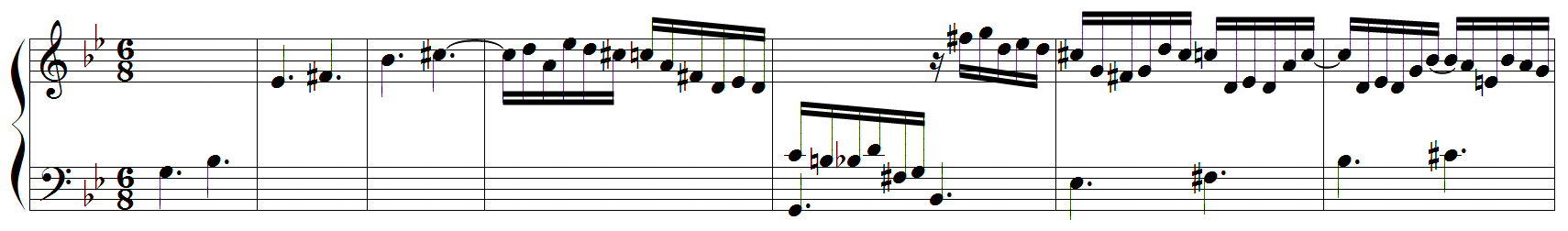
Anton Reicha, Fugue No. 9

Hans von Bülow wrote an arrangement for concert performance.

In 1923, Amy Beach took a feline motif as the basis of her Fantasia fugata, Op. 87. The piece carries the inscription: "... the composer is indebted to 'Hamlet', a large black Angora who had been placed on the keyboard with the hope that he might emulate Scarlatti's cat and improvise a fugue theme".

== Performances ==
The Cat fugue has been a popular piece at least since the 19th century. Franz Liszt – who had been introduced to the piece by the Roman collector of manuscripts Fortunato Santini – included it in his programmes in Berlin in the early 1840s; Ignaz Moscheles also performed it, and both programmed it under the title Cat's fugue.

== See also ==
- "Kitten on the Keys", another keyboard piece its composer claimed to have been similarly inspired
