= Lodovico Rocca =

Italian composer

Lodovico Rocca (29 November 1895, Turin – 24 June 1986, Turin) was an Italian composer.

A pupil of Giacomo Orefice, his operas, written in late verismo style, met with some success in Italy but have been little performed elsewhere. They include: Morte di Frine, In Terra di Leggenda, Il Dibuk, his most successful work, Monte Ivnòr, and L'Uragano.

He was director of the Turin Conservatory from 1940 until 1966.

== Sources ==
- The Complete Dictionary of Opera & Operetta, James Anderson, (Wings Books, 1993) ISBN 0-517-09156-9; Enciclopedia Treccani (http://www.treccani.it/enciclopedia/lodovico-rocca/)
