= Gianluca Cascioli =

Italian pianist, conductor, and composer

- Born: 17 July 1979 (age 46); Turin, Italy
- Education: Turin Conservatory
- Occupations: Pianist; Conductor; Composer
- Website: gianluca-cascioli.com

Gianluca Cascioli (born 17 July 1979 in Turin) is an Italian pianist, conductor, and composer.

He studied composition at the Giuseppe Verdi Conservatory in Turin and piano with Franco Scala. In 1994, Cascioli won the Umberto Micheli International Piano Competition, whose jury included Luciano Berio, Elliott Carter, Charles Rosen, and Maurizio Pollini. The prize included a record contract with Deutsche Grammophon, for which he recorded three CDs in his late teens.

He has appeared as a piano soloist with the Berlin Philharmonic, the Boston Symphony Orchestra, the Chicago Symphony Orchestra, Royal Concertgebouw Orchestra, New York Philharmonic, the Vienna Philharmonic, and numerous other orchestras worldwide. Conductors he has worked with include Claudio Abbado, Roberto Abbado, Myung-Whun Chung, Riccardo Muti, Lorin Maazel, Valery Gergiev, Zubin Mehta, Roberto Carnevale, Mstislav Rostropovich, Neville Marriner, and many others. His chamber-music partners have included Maxim Vengerov, Mstislav Rostropovich, Stefano Mollo, the Berlin Philharmonic Octet, and many others.

He has conducted the Deutsche Kammerorchester Frankfurt, and among compositions of his to be performed are a Sonatina (2004) premiered at the Hamburg Musikfest, Variations for Piano, premiered in Japan, and a Symphony premiered in Italy, as well as a Violin and Piano Sonata premiered in Italy with Stefano Mollo.

His discography includes three CDs for DG, a recording of the original Fantasie version of Schumann's Piano Concerto with Mario Venzago and the Basel Symphony Orchestra for Hänssler, a CD of Chopin for Decca, and a CD of Debussy's Préludes, Children's Corner, and other works for Decca.
