= Barone Canavese =

- Comune
- Comune di Barone Canavese
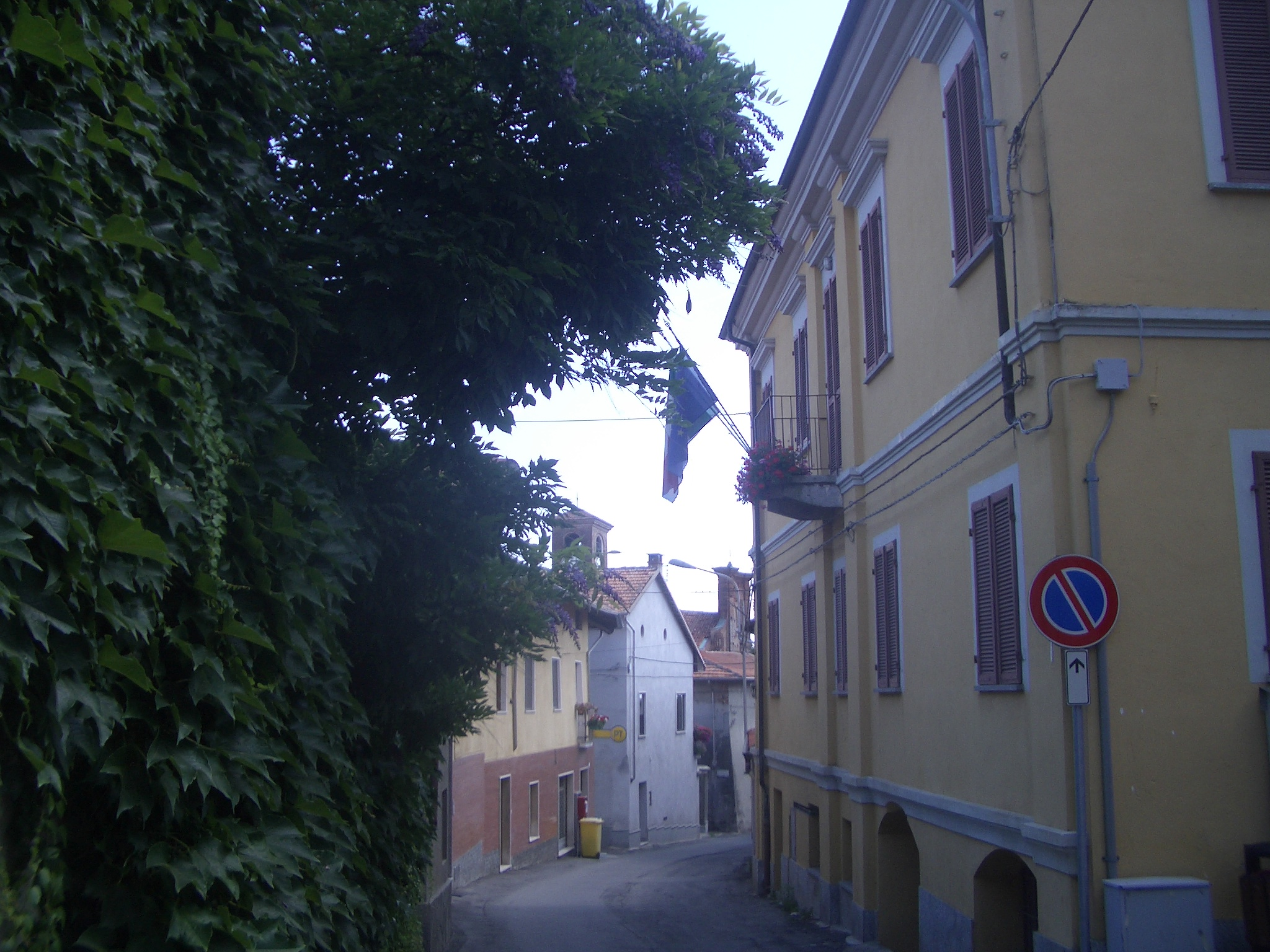
- Town Hall.

- Coat of arms

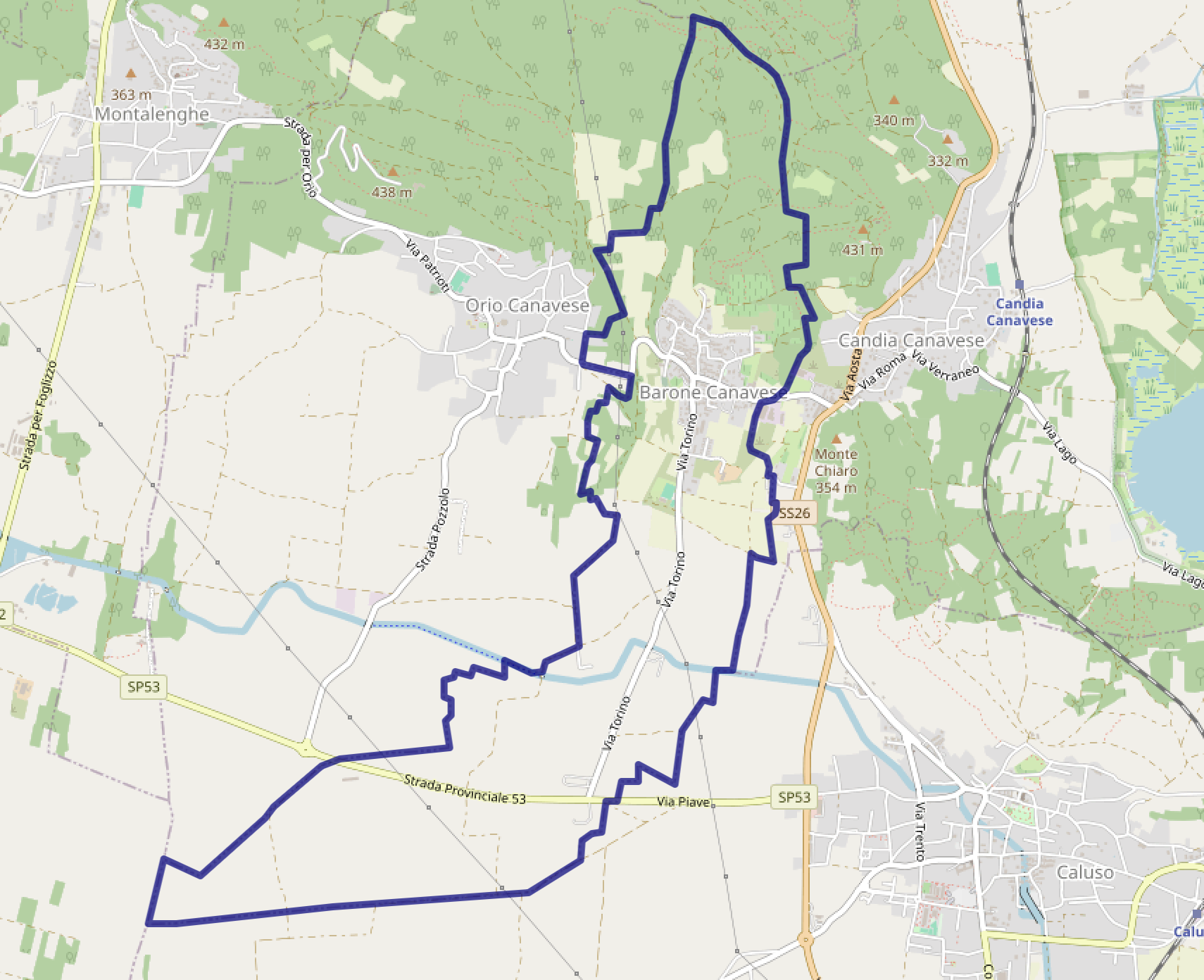
- OSM map of Barone Canavese.

- Location within Italy Location within Piedmont
- Coordinates: 45°20′N 7°52′E
- Country: Italy
- Region: Piedmont
- Metropolitan city: Turin (TO)

Government
  - Mayor: Alessio Bertinato

Area
  - Total: 3.99 km^{2} (1.54 sq mi)
- Elevation: 325 m (1,066 ft)

Population (30 April 2017)
  - Total: 590
  - Density: 150/km^{2} (380/sq mi)
- Demonym: Baronesei
- Time zone: UTC+1 (CET)
  - Summer (DST): UTC+2 (CEST)
- Postal code: 10010
- Dialing code: 011
- Website: Official website

Barone Canavese is a comune (municipality) in the Metropolitan City of Turin in the Italian region Piedmont, located about 30 kilometres (19 mi) northeast of Turin.

Barone Canavese borders the following municipalities: Mercenasco, San Giorgio Canavese, Candia Canavese, Orio Canavese, and Caluso.

Barone Canavese Castle is located in the village.
