= Caccioli =

Caccioli is an Italian surname. Notable people with the surname include:

- Andrea Caccioli (1194–1254), Italian Roman Catholic priest
- Giovanni Battista Caccioli (1623–1675), Italian painter of the Baroque period
- Giuseppe Antonio Caccioli (1672–1740), Italian painter of the Baroque period
