= Rubén Domínguez (tenor) =

Venezuelan singer

Rubén Domínguez (September 4, 1935 – September 11, 2015) was a Venezuelan lirico-spinto tenor. He is recognized for his work within the lirico-spinto repertory, as well as works by Bellini and Donizetti. He played many verismo roles such as Canio in Pagliacci. He also played Otello, Mario Cavaradossi, Manrico, Radamés and Calaf.

== Early life ==
Rubén Domínguez was born on September 4, 1935, in Caracas, Venezuela. When Domínguez was pressured by a Venezuelan political party (AD) that he would never sing in Venezuela if he did not study with party protégé, Carmen Teresa Hurtado, he chose instead to move to Milan, Italy. Mr. Dominguez was married to Cuban American, Asunción M. Ferrer.

== Musical career ==
In Milan he was accepted as a student of Spanish voice teacher Mercedes Llopart, also the teacher of the Spanish tenor, Alfredo Kraus. He made his international operatic debut in Tosca at the Teatro de Bellas Artes in 1967. Domínguez followed this with performances of the same opera in Dallas, Texas opposite soprano Magda Olivero. He later returned to Caracas and participated in various productions in the Opera Metropolitana de Caracas (OMAC). He has sung in the principal houses of South America including the Municipal Theater of Santiago and the Teatro Municipal of Rio de Janeiro in its 1978 reopening performance of Turandot with Ghena Dimitrova. He has also participated in various opera festivals such as the Puccini Festival in Torre del Lago, Italy, La Stagione Lirica Estiva de Cagliari in Sardinia, the San Francisco Opera Festival, and the International Festival of the Opera Metropolitana de Caracas. In North America he has performed at the Metropolitan Opera House and the Teatro de Bellas Artes. Domínguez has performed in the opera companies of Edmonton, Baltimore, San Diego, New Orleans, Michigan Opera Theatre, and the Opera Pacific. In 1988, Domínguez was awarded the Luciano Pavarotti Award. In addition to his on-stage experience, Domínguez has been involved in teaching in the form of master classes in vocal production. Rubén Domínguez died in his native Caracas on September 11, 2015.
