= Orio Canavese =

- Comune
- Comune di Orio Canavese
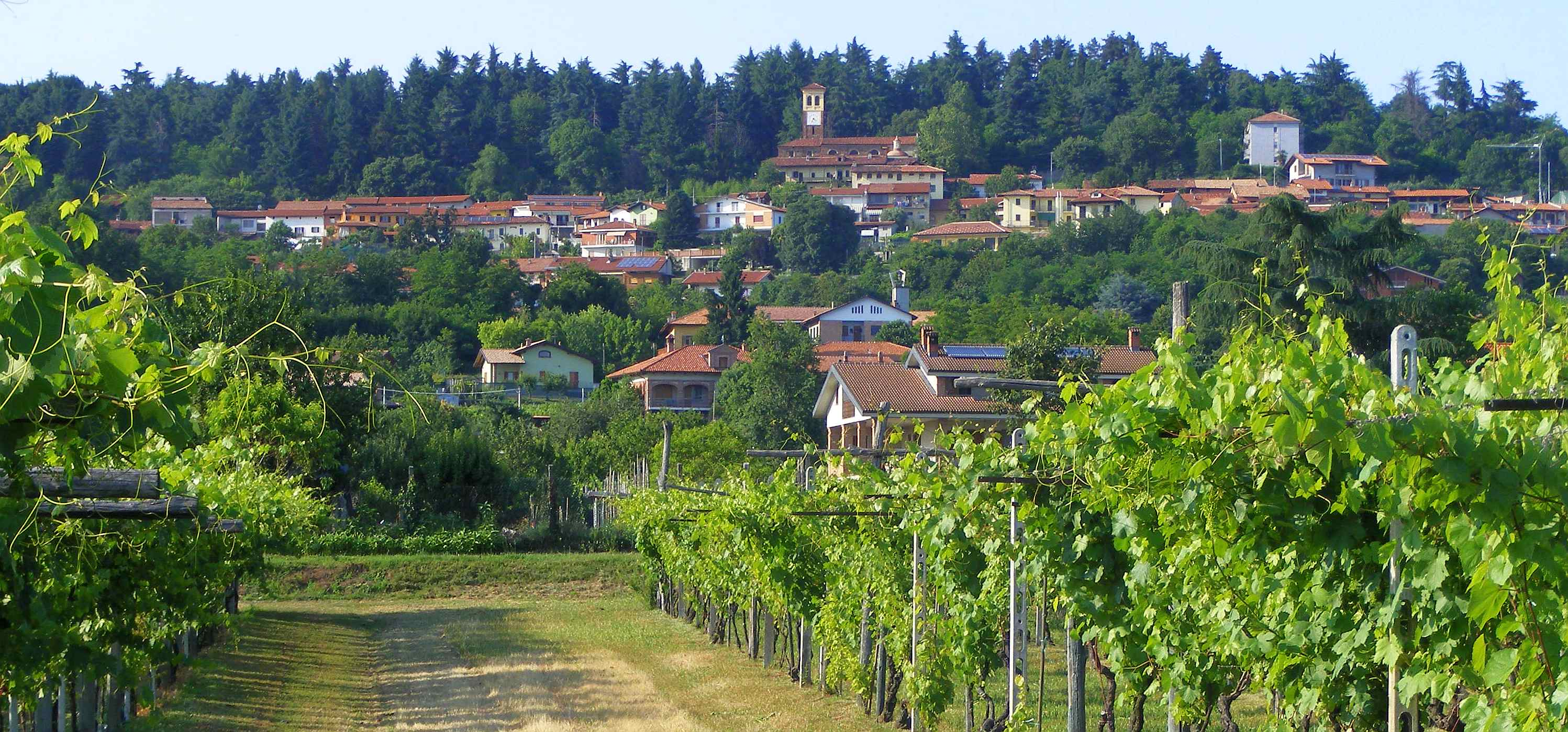

- Location within Italy Location within Piedmont
- Coordinates: 45°20′N 7°52′E
- Country: Italy
- Region: Piedmont
- Metropolitan city: Turin (TO)

Government
  - Mayor: ?

Area
  - Total: 7.1 km^{2} (2.7 sq mi)

Population (Dec. 2004)
  - Total: 799
  - Density: 110/km^{2} (290/sq mi)
- Time zone: UTC+1 (CET)
  - Summer (DST): UTC+2 (CEST)
- Postal code: 10010
- Dialing code: 011

Orio Canavese is a comune (municipality) in the Metropolitan City of Turin in the Italian region Piedmont, located about 30 km (19 mi) northeast of Turin. As of 31 December 2004, it had a population of 799 and an area of 7.1 km^{2} (2.7 sq mi).

Orio Canavese borders the following municipalities: Mercenasco, San Giorgio Canavese, Montalenghe, and Barone Canavese.

== Demographic evolution ==
Historical population

Year	Pop.	±%
1861	941	—
1871	996	+5.8%
1881	1,185	+19.0%
1901	1,263	+6.6%
1911	1,098	−13.1%

Year	Pop.	±%
1921	1,099	+0.1%
1931	943	−14.2%
1936	873	−7.4%
1951	889	+1.8%
1961	880	−1.0%

Year	Pop.	±%
1971	870	−1.1%
1981	786	−9.7%
1991	790	+0.5%
2001	781	−1.1%

Source: Data from ISTAT
