= Turin Conservatory =

Music conservatory in Turin, Italy

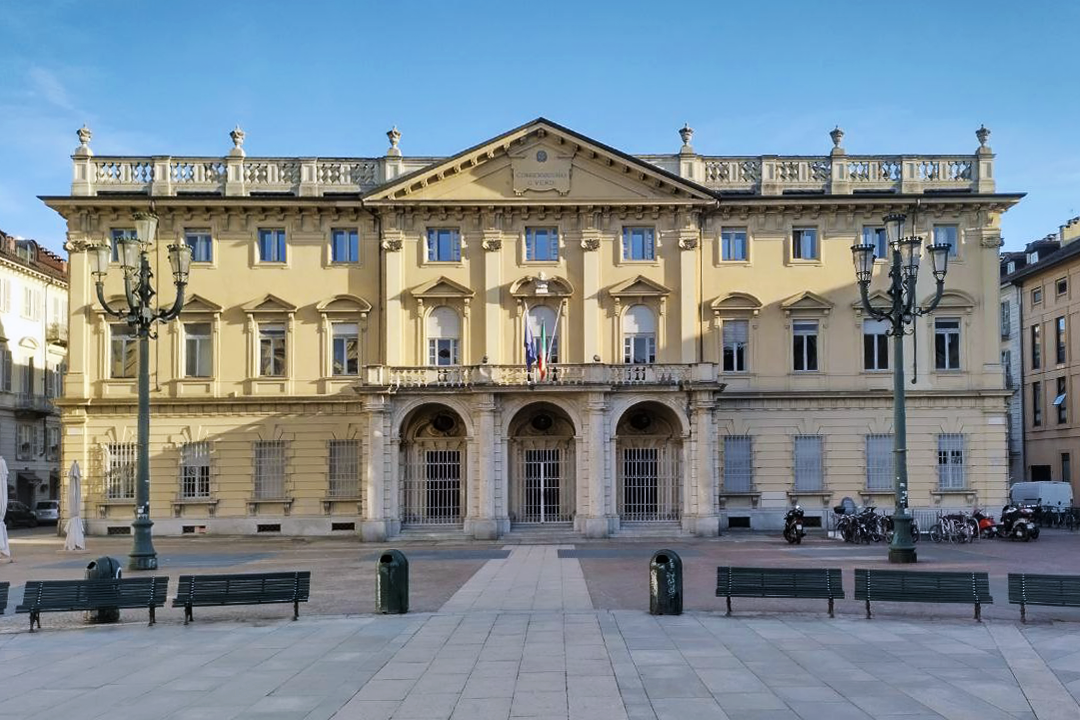
Conservatorio Statale di Musica Giuseppe Verdi, also known as the Turin Conservatory

The Conservatorio Statale di Musica Giuseppe Verdi, also known as the Conservatorio Giuseppe Verdi or Conservatorio Torino and more commonly known in English as the Turin Conservatory, is a music conservatory in Turin, Italy. It should not be confused with the Milan Conservatory or Como Conservatory; schools which have also been known as the Conservatorio Giuseppe Verdi.

== History ==
The Turin Conservatory was founded on 11 June 1866 with the name Liceo Musicale. In 1887 its name was changed to the Istituto Musicale when composer Giovanni Bolzoni became director of the school. In 1936 it was enlarged to become the Conservatorio Statale di Musica Giuseppe Verdi. Other directors of the conservatory include composer and pianist Franco Alfano and composers Lodovico Rocca and Sandro Fuga.

== Notable alumni ==
- Irene Abrigo
- Cinico Angelini
- Giuseppe Pietro Bagetti
- Arturo Basile
- Carlo Emilio Bonferroni
- Fred Buscaglione
- Carlo Adolfo Cantù
- Matilde Capuis
- Andrea Carè
- Gianluca Cascioli
- Giulio Castagnoli (also faculty)
- Umberto Clerici
- Giancarlo Chiaramello
- Azio Corghi (also faculty)
- Luciana Littizzetto
- Riccardo Malipiero
- Enzo Muccetti
- Fernando Previtali
- Carlo Savina
- Marina Scalafiotti (also faculty)
- Flavio Testi
- Edgard Varèse
- Arturo Vigna
- Alfredo Rizzo

== Notable faculty ==
- Elio Battaglia
- Pierluigi Cimma
- Andrea Della Corte
- Giorgio Federico Ghedini
- Dado Moroni
- Luigi Perrachio
- Alberto Soresina
- Pietro Spada
