= Alessandro Longo =

Italian composer (1864–1945)

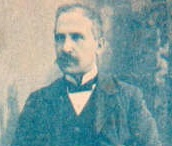
- Born: 31 December 1864; Amantea
- Died: 3 November 1945 (aged 80)
- Occupations: composer and musicologist

Alessandro Longo (31 December 1864 – 3 November 1945) was an Italian composer and musicologist.

== Early life ==
Longo was born in Amantea. After studying at the Naples Conservatory under Beniamino Cesi (and composition under Paolo Serrao), he began teaching piano at his alma mater in 1887, deputizing for Cesi as pianoforte professor, and succeeded him in 1897. One of Longo's earliest students was Franco Alfano.

== Career ==
As a pianist, Longo often played in chamber ensemble with the Ferni Quartet, and with the Quartetto Napoletano (with Cantani, Parmiciano, Scarano and Viterbini). He founded various musical institutions in Naples, and gained a high reputation as a concert pianist. In 1914 he began editing the review L'Arte Pianistica. He became Director of the Naples Conservatory in 1944, and died in Naples the following year, aged 80.

== Legacy ==
Today, Longo is mainly remembered for compiling an almost comprehensive catalogue of the keyboard works of Domenico Scarlatti. For many years, Scarlatti's keyboard sonatas were conventionally identified by their Longo numbers, but these were later superseded by those found in Ralph Kirkpatrick's catalogue. Longo's Catalogue originated in his landmark full publication of the works of Scarlatti in 11 volumes and implied particular groupings of the sonatas, the chronology of which was later completely revised and differently grouped in Kirkpatrick's 1953 study of the composer. Longo also edited works by Domenico Gallo.

His compositions include, among others, two works for piano four-hands, a serenade and a suite; suites for piano with bassoon with oboe, with violin, flute and with clarinet.

== Family life ==
His son, Achille Longo (1900–1954), was also a composer.
