= Ralph Kirkpatrick =

American harpsichordist and musicologist (1911–1984)

Ralph Leonard Kirkpatrick (/kɜːrkˈpætrɪk/; June 10, 1911 – April 13, 1984) was an American harpsichordist and musicologist, widely known for his chronological catalog of Domenico Scarlatti's keyboard sonatas as well as for his performances and recordings.

== Life and work ==
Kirkpatrick was born in Leominster, Massachusetts in 1911 and began studying piano at a young age. He continued his piano studies in Cambridge while studying art history at Harvard University. He became interested in the harpsichord at Harvard and gave his first harpsichord recital there in 1930. After graduating in 1931, he traveled to Europe on a John Knowles Paine Fellowship. He studied with Nadia Boulanger and harpsichord revival pioneer Wanda Landowska in Paris, with Arnold Dolmetsch in Haslemere, Heinz Tiessen in Berlin, and Günther Ramin in Leipzig. In January 1933 he made his European debut in Berlin performing Johann Sebastian Bach's Goldberg Variations. In 1933 he also performed several concerts in Italy, including a clavichord recital at the villa of Bernard Berenson. In the summers of 1933 and 1934 he taught at the Mozarteum in Salzburg, Austria. A Guggenheim Fellowship awarded in 1936 enabled him to study seventeenth- and eighteenth-century manuscripts and sources in Europe. In 1938 he inaugurated a festival of Baroque music at the Governor's Palace in Williamsburg, Virginia and continued as adviser and principal performer for a number of years.

In 1938, G. Schirmer, NY. published his edition of Bach's Goldberg Variations, which includes extensive discussion of ornamentation, fingering, phrasing, tempo, dynamics, and general interpretation. In the late 1930s he began his research on Domenico Scarlatti and he published his acclaimed biography of Scarlatti in 1953. It has been translated into German, French, Italian, Spanish, and Japanese. He also published a critical edition of 60 sonatas by Scarlatti in 1953. Scarlatti's sonatas are now conventionally designated by their Kirkpatrick numbers (shown as Kk. --, and more recently with a single K.), which is now considered the standard, authoritative numbering system for these works (despite at least two rival systems) (see opus number and List of solo keyboard sonatas by Domenico Scarlatti).

In 1940, he was appointed to the music faculty of Yale University and he remained there until his retirement in 1976, the year that he became blind. He was invited to inaugurate the Ernest Bloch Visiting Professorship at the University of California, Berkeley in 1964 where he gave a series of lectures and performances on Bach's The Well-Tempered Clavier. These lectures were later published in 1984 as Interpreting Bach's Well-Tempered Clavier: A Performer's Discourse of Method.

He performed widely throughout the United States and Europe from the 1930s to the early 1980s, in recital and with major orchestras. He continued performing even after he became blind in 1976. He resumed performing in 1977 with a semi-private recital at Versailles as well as a public recital at the Frick Collection in New York. He gave one of his last recitals at the first Boston Early Music Festival in 1981.

During the 1960s, Kirkpatrick made recordings of the complete harpsichord works of Johann Sebastian Bach (Archiv). The instruments he used for many of these recordings were ones that had recently been made by the firm of JC Neupert in Bamberg. In the 21st century, such instruments have become known as "revival" style instruments, their features including 'inauthentic' metal frames and robust, heavy construction. These recordings show Kirkpatrick's formidable keyboard technique to full advantage, and, unusually for recordings of the time, he observes almost all of the repeats. His performances of The Well-Tempered Clavier were recorded on both the harpsichord and the clavichord. His later Bach recordings used a reproduction French harpsichord by Hubbard & Dowd.

As a performer and recording artist, he became best known for his harpsichord performances of the keyboard music of Bach and Scarlatti, but he also performed and recorded works by other composers, including Rameau, Couperin, Handel, Byrd, and Purcell. He recorded on the clavichord (e.g. Bach's two- and three-part inventions, as well as both volumes of The Well-Tempered Clavier). He recalled playing a clavichord at a house concert in Hamburg, Germany. He performed and recorded on the fortepiano (especially works by Mozart) and also recorded several Mozart piano concertos on the modern piano. He toured widely with the violinist Alexander Schneider and they recorded violin and harpsichord sonatas by Bach and Mozart.

Kirkpatrick also played modern music, including Quincy Porter's Concerto for Harpsichord and Orchestra, Darius Milhaud's Sonata for Violin and Harpsichord, the Double Concerto for Harpsichord, Piano with Two Chamber Orchestras by Elliott Carter, and the Set of Four for Harpsichord (or Piano) by Henry Cowell. Both the Carter and Cowell pieces were inspired by Kirkpatrick and dedicated to him. He also performed and recorded the Manuel de Falla Harpsichord Concerto and played the piano in a recording of the Stravinsky Septet.

In addition to his biography of Scarlatti published in 1953 and his book Interpreting Bach's Well-Tempered Clavier: A Performer's Discourse of Method published posthumously by Yale University in 1984, he also wrote a memoir Early Years which was published posthumously in 1985 by Peter Lang. Meredith Kirkpatrick edited several books of the writings of Ralph Kirkpatrick entitled Ralph Kirkpatrick: Letters of the American Harpsichordist and Scholar (University of Rochester Press, 2014) and Reflections of an American Harpsichordist: Unpublished Memoirs, Essays, and Lectures of Ralph Kirkpatrick (University of Rochester Press, 2017).

Kirkpatrick died in Guilford, Connecticut at the age of 72.

Kirkpatrick was an elected member of both the American Academy of Arts and Sciences and the American Philosophical Society. During his distinguished career he was awarded honorary degrees from the Eastman School of Music, Oberlin, and Yale University. On April 2, 1999, the asteroid 9902 Kirkpatrick is named in his honor.

His niece, Meredith Kirkpatrick, compiled an online bibliography of publications by and about Ralph Kirkpatrick as well as a discography of his recordings. [1]. His brother, Clifford Kirkpatrick (1898–1971), was a sociologist and was awarded a Guggenheim Fellowship in 1936, the same year as his brother.

== See also ==
- List of solo keyboard sonatas by Domenico Scarlatti
