= Giancarlo Monsalve =

Chilean operatic tenor

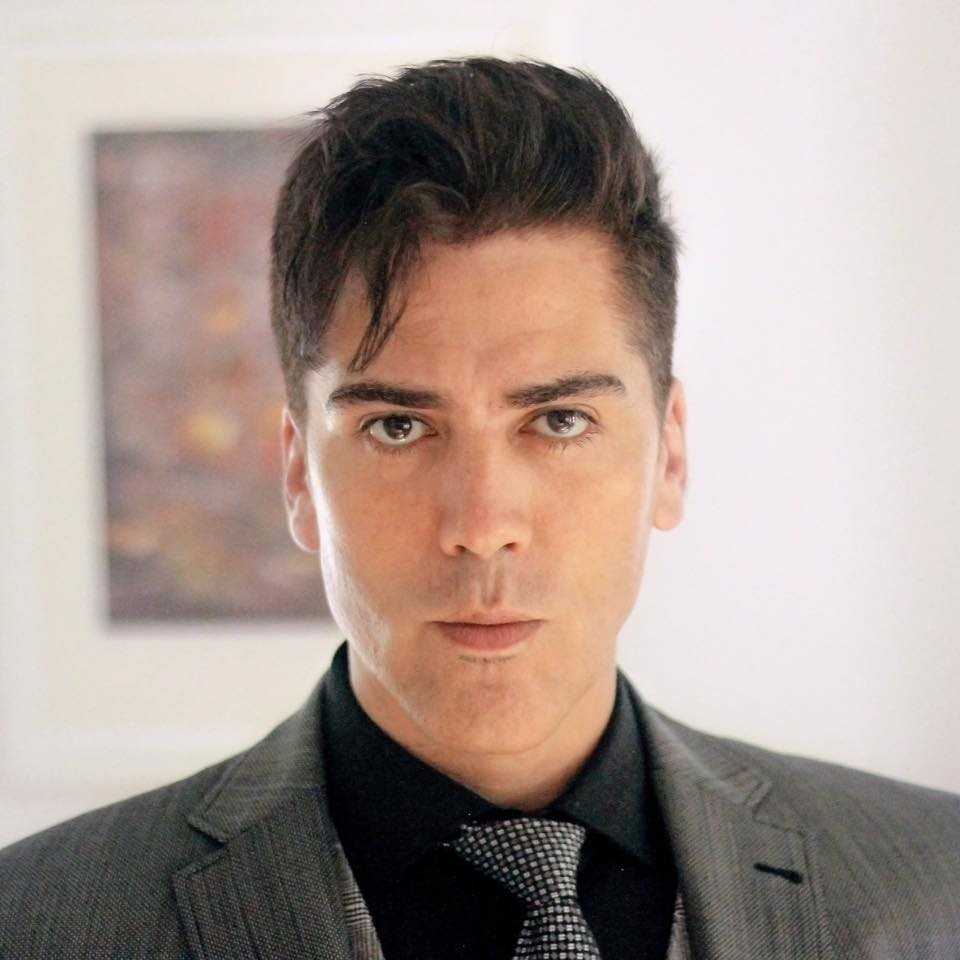
- September 2020
- Born: Rubén Giancarlo Monsalve Leyton; 4 March 1982 (age 44); Valparaíso, Chile
- Occupations: Opera singer, actor, cultural ambassador
- Years active: 2006–present
- Spouse: Anna-Madeleine Monsalve Leyton (2012–present)
- Parent(s): Rubén Alberto Monsalve Rojas, Marlein Scheider Leyton Flores
- Website: www.giancarlomonsalve.com

Giancarlo Monsalve Leyton (born 4 March 1982) is a Chilean spinto tenor. He is the Cultural Ambassador of his home town Valparaíso, a UNESCO World Heritage site. He is known for his portrayal as Don José in Carmen, Cavaradossi in Tosca, Turiddu in Cavalleria rusticana, the title role in Don Carlos, Riccardo in Un ballo in maschera, Prince Calaf in Turandot and Don Alvaro in La forza del destino

== Studies and technique ==
Monsalve's vocal technique is formed with the traditional old Italian school, passed on from generation to generation. However his technique is consolidated with the bases of two different schools, Ettore Campogalliani and Arturo Melocchi.

Monsalve was born in the Chilean city Valparaíso, where he later began his studies of fine arts at the School of "Bellas Artes". Monsalve started his musical studies the 2001 in Viña del Mar at the Conservatory Izidor Handler with soprano Nora Lopez Von Vriessen and tenor Mario Barrientos. Lopez Von Vriessen is a former student of the Legendary Sopranos Gina Cigna and Maria Caniglia. Barrientos is a former student of the Tenor Carlos Santelices. In 2004 Monsalve moved to Italy and continued his studies learning the technique of Ettore Campogalliani in Modena with one of his students, the soprano Mirella Freni. Ettore Campogalliani was also teacher of Renata Tebaldi, Luciano Pavarotti, Renata Scotto, Ferruccio Furlanetto, Ruggero Raimondi, and other big singers. In 2007 Monsalve had private lessons with the tenor Dano Raffanti, former student of the famous musicologist, critic and voice teacher Rodolfo Celletti. 2008 Monsalve had private lessons with tenor Lando Bartolini, former student of the Metropolitan Opera Bass Nicola Moscona. In 2009 Monsalve had a master class with the soprano Montserrat Caballé in Zaragoza to learn the breath support of this legendary singer, and returns to Italy to learn the technique or "method" of Arturo Melocchi, teacher of Mario Del Monaco, Franco Corelli and also Renata Tebaldi, with the Bass Leodino Ferri† who was one of the few last living students of Melocchi. Same year, always in Italy, Monsalve learned the "Del Monaco-Melocchi" technique with who is till now his teacher, the Italian tenor Nicola Martinucci, student of Marcello del Monaco and in 2010/2011 had private lessons with tenors Gianfranco Cecchele in Italy and Corneliu Murgu in Romania, both formed students of Mario Del Monaco.

Monsalve has been scenically trained with actor and Chilean director Juan Edmundo González del Valle†, renowned Chilean Actor, theater director and one of the pioneers of the Chilean street theater in the 80's and later with Hollywood Stars coach Bernard Hiller.

== Career ==
Monsalve made his professional debut in Italy, with the opera Paolo e Francesca by Luigi Mancinelli in the 2006 season of the Teatro Comunale di Bologna where he returned in 2012 for the Opera Cavalleria rusticana.

After his debut Monsalve's career has spanned to major global opera houses, Royal Opera House, Covent Garden, Arena di Verona, Zürich Opera House, Lausanne Opera, Royal Opera House Muscat Sultanate of Oman, the Washington National Opera at the Kennedy Center, Bayerische Staatsoper, Sejong Center for the Performing Arts, Greek National Opera at the Odeon of Herodes Atticus Amphitheatre, Sferisterio Opera Festival di Macerata, Teatro Petruzzelli of Bari, Opéra de Nice, Staatsoper Hannover, National Centre for the Performing Arts (India), Teatro Regio di Torino, Teatro Nacional de São Carlos, Angers-Nantes Opéra, Avenches Opera, Grand Theatre, Warsaw, the Ancient theatre of Taormina, among others.

Monsalve has worked with conductors such as Patrick Fournillier, Nayden Todorov, Riccardo Muti, Carlo Rizzi, Paolo Carignani, Xian Zhang, Antonello Allemandi, Oleg Caetani, Julian Kovatchev, Valerio Galli, Roberto Rizzi Brignoli, Enrico Dovico, Carlo Montanaro, Jean-Yves Ossonce, Frank Beermann among others.

He has also worked with stage directors such as Hugo De Ana, Francesca Zambello, Patrice Caurier et Moshe Leiser, Mario de Carlo, Gianfranco de Bosio, Liliana Cavani, Gianni Quaranta, Garnett Bruce, Alberto Triola, Stephen Langridge, Giancarlo del Monaco, Peter Konwitschny, Lorenzo Mariani, Carlos Wagner among others.

== Television and radio ==
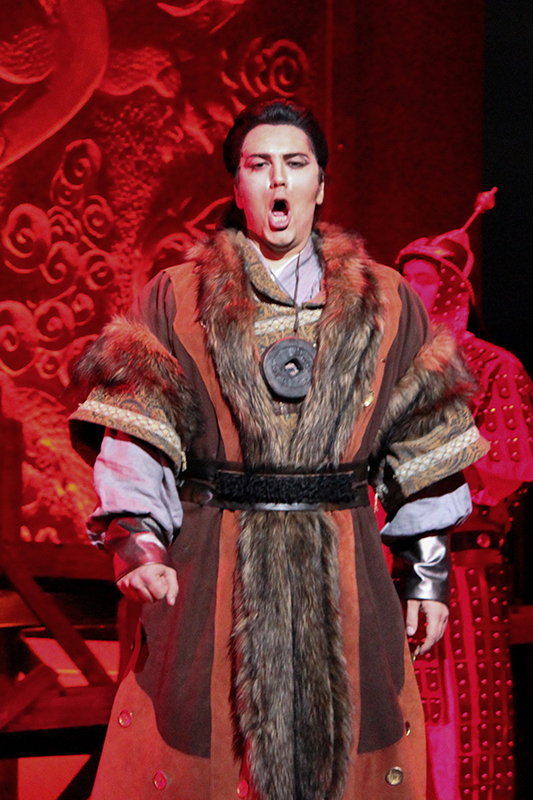
As Prince Calaf, Turandot

RAI Radiotelevisione italiana S.p.A, Arena di Verona, opening season gala 2011, Mediaset, Italian-based mass media company, opera Cavalleria rusticana, France 3 National TV, opera Madama Butterfly season-opening in Dijon, RTVE Corporación de Radio y Televisión Española, S.A, opera Carmen, SRG SSR, Swiss Broadcasting Corporation, opera Tosca from the Lausanne Opera Radio Swiss Classic, Polskie Radio Poland's national radio, opera Don Carlo from the Grand Theatre, Warsaw, Rádio e Televisão de Portugal RPT National Radio and Television of Portugal, opera Don Carlo from the Teatro Nacional de São Carlo, among others.

== Cinema ==
Monsalve's cinematographic debut happened on 15 July 2015, with a live broadcast of Georges Bizet's opera Carmen as the main male character Don José in the principal cinemas of the whole Europe, directed by Enrico Castiglione and produced by Rising Alternative.

== Honors ==
- Monsalve was named Cultural Ambassador of his city, receiving the Unesco Medal of Valparaíso, Unesco World Heritage. 11 August 2010.

== Awards ==
- On 6 December 2015, the Mascagnian Committee of Bagnara di Romagna, Italy, awarded Giancarlo Monsalve with the 35th Mascagni D'Oro Award (The Golden Pietro Mascagni).
