= Monsalve =

Monsalve is a Spanish surname. Notable people with the name include:

- Adriana Monsalve, Sports journalist
- David Monsalve, Canadian football player
- Giancarlo Monsalve, Chilean tenor
- Hussein Monsalve, Venezuelan cyclist
- Jonathan Monsalve, Venezuelan cyclist
- José Manuel Monsalve, Brazilian basketball coach
- Paulino Monsalve, Spanish hockey player
