= Arturo Melocchi =

Italian baritone and voice teacher

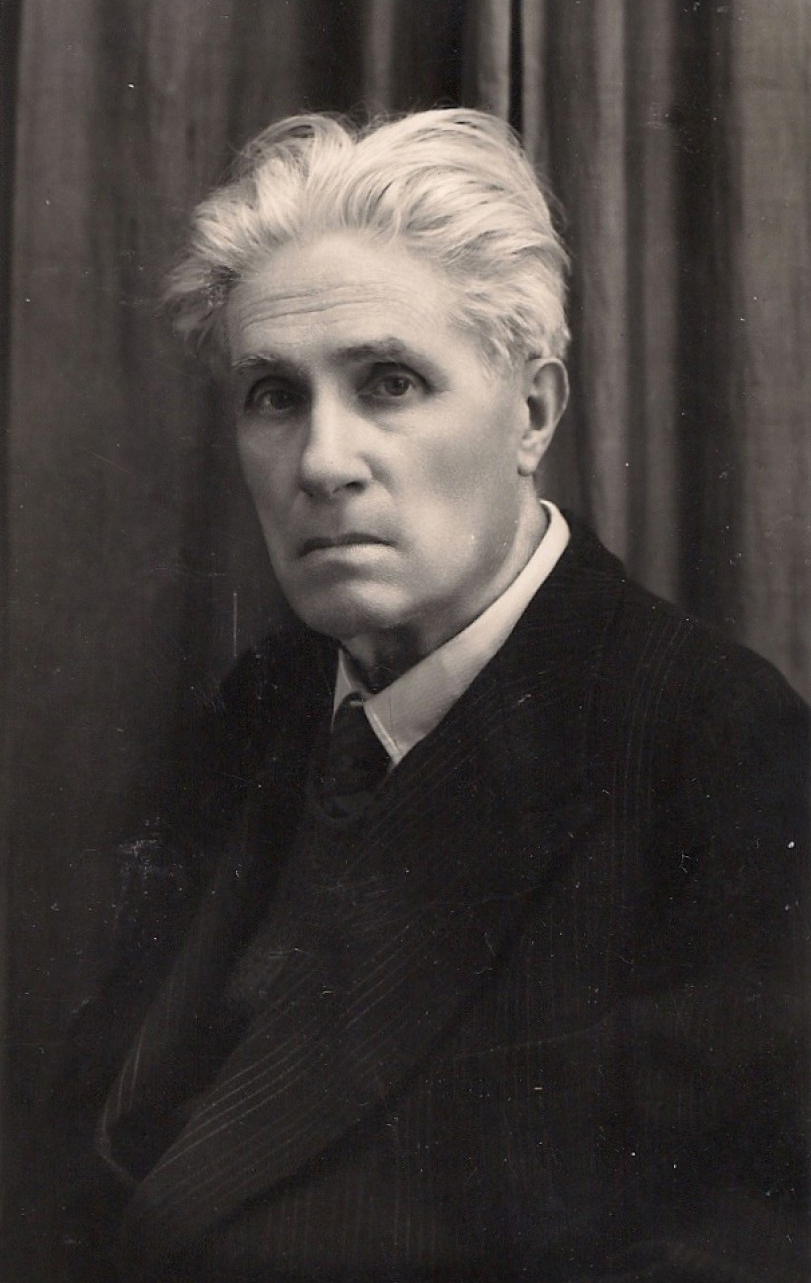
- Arturo Melocchi
- Born: Arturo di Giuseppe Melocchi; December 9, 1879; Milan, Italy
- Died: October 25, 1960 (aged 80)
- Education: Regio Conservatorio di Milano
- Occupations: Voice teacher, Singer, vocal pedagogue
- Years active: 1907–1960
- Known for: Low laryngeal singing method

Arturo di Giuseppe Melocchi (December 9, 1879 – October 25, 1960) was an Italian baritone and voice teacher who is best known for having been the teacher of dramatic tenor Mario Del Monaco and his older brother Marcello Del Monaco. In addition, his method influenced the voice and technical development of tenor Franco Corelli.

== Biography ==
=== Education ===
Arturo Melocchi was born in Milan. He studied at the Regio Conservatorio di Milano under Giuseppe Gallignani, who was also the director of the Conservatory. On November 13, 1907 Melocchi graduated, receiving his license to be a singer, as well as to become a teacher of singing at any public school in Italy. His exams—with diploma requirements nearly identical to those of the old conservatorio system—consisted of the following:

- two arias for baritone voice—"Sei vendicata assai" from Dinorah by Meyerbeer and "S'il faut s'enfler de gloire," sung by Boniface, the monastery cook in Le jongleur de Notre-Dame (meeting the requirement for an aria by contemporary a composer).
- the sixth vocalise from Gaetano Nava's Method for Baritone
- the aria "È ver ch'io t'ingannai" from Fra Diavolo by Meyerbeer
- sight reading a piece taken from Pier Luigi Farnese by Constantino Palumbo
- questions about the physiology of singing, about teaching, and on the best old school and modern authors

Melocchi's scorecard showed that he had already proven himself expertly prepared and capable in the complementary studies of piano, theory, harmony, scenic arts, and physiology of the vocal organs, as well as the standard cultural studies in Italian history, poetry, and literature.

=== Liceo Musicale Rossini & Mario Del Monaco ===
Melocchi became a teacher of singing at the Conservatory, appointed by Gallignani. In January 1912 he was called to take the title the Chair of Singing at the Liceo Musicale Rossini in Pesaro. He held this position uninterruptedly until 1941.

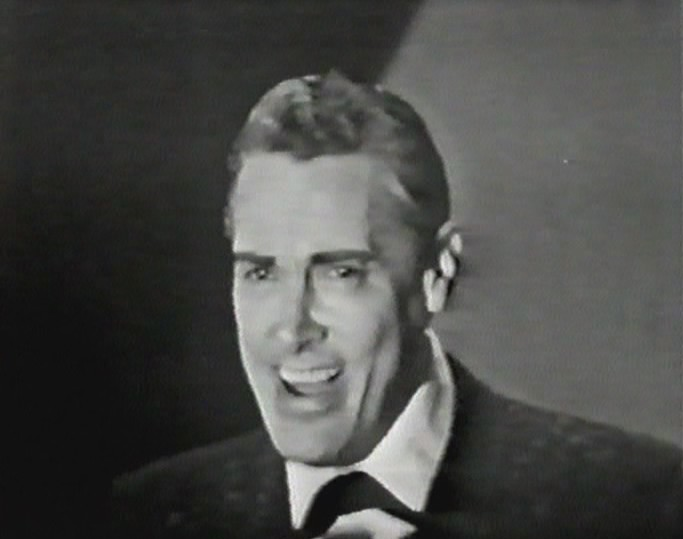
Eurovision Song Contest 1965 - Mario del Monaco

Around 1932 a young Mario Del Monaco—whose voice had been dangerously lightened in his studies with Luisa Melai-Palazzini, destroying its natural emission and timbre—began to consult and take lessons from Melocchi, who reeducated his voice with the appropriate exercises, gradually returning it its power, its breadth and natural ease, and giving it its full homogeneity along the entire range from low B♭ to high D♭. However, not yet satisfied with the progress he had achieved, Del Monaco began to make up and add to his technique, in order to get more from his vocal organs. In 1936, Del Monaco won a prize that gave him the opportunity to study his craft at the Teatro dell'Opera di Roma. This experience, in which he was again assigned inappropriate light repertoire, caused him to lose his voice nearly completely. In 1938, he returned to Pesaro, where he attempted to resume his studies with Melocchi. At first Melocchi did not take Del Monaco back, but at the insistence of Rina Filippini (later Del Monaco's wife), Melocchi accepted the tenor into his studio, and within six months, Del Monaco's voice was rebuilt to the state that quickly carried him forward to becoming the greatest dramatic tenor of the mid-20th century.

On May 18, 1941 Melocchi was suspended without pre-warning, for supposed "poor performance." He later said that it was well known that he was actually suspended for his anti-fascist views. Similar anti-fascist sentiments were held by his maestro Gallignani, who after his being fired from his directorship in 1923, became distraught and committed suicide by throwing himself out a window. During the entire period of fascism in Italy, Melocchi was one of only two teachers at the Liceo Rossini who never joined the Fascist Party and refused the Fascist card.

Between the time of Melocchi's suspension and the end of the fascist Italian Social Republic in 1945, he spent three years abroad, teaching singing at a school of music in Hong Kong and at the Shanghai Conservatory of Music (then under another name), which had on its staff teachers from as far as Russia and France. During these three years, he learned to speak correct and practical English, French, and Russian.

In August 1945, Melocchi himself submitted a lengthy petition to the Ministry of Public Instruction (Arts Division) to allow him to take up his post again at the Liceo Rossini. According to the annals of the school, pleas from students and colleagues—as well as the recent death of tenor and teacher Umberto Macnez—did finally result in his reassignment there from 1947 to 1949.

=== Carlo Scaravelli & Franco Corelli ===
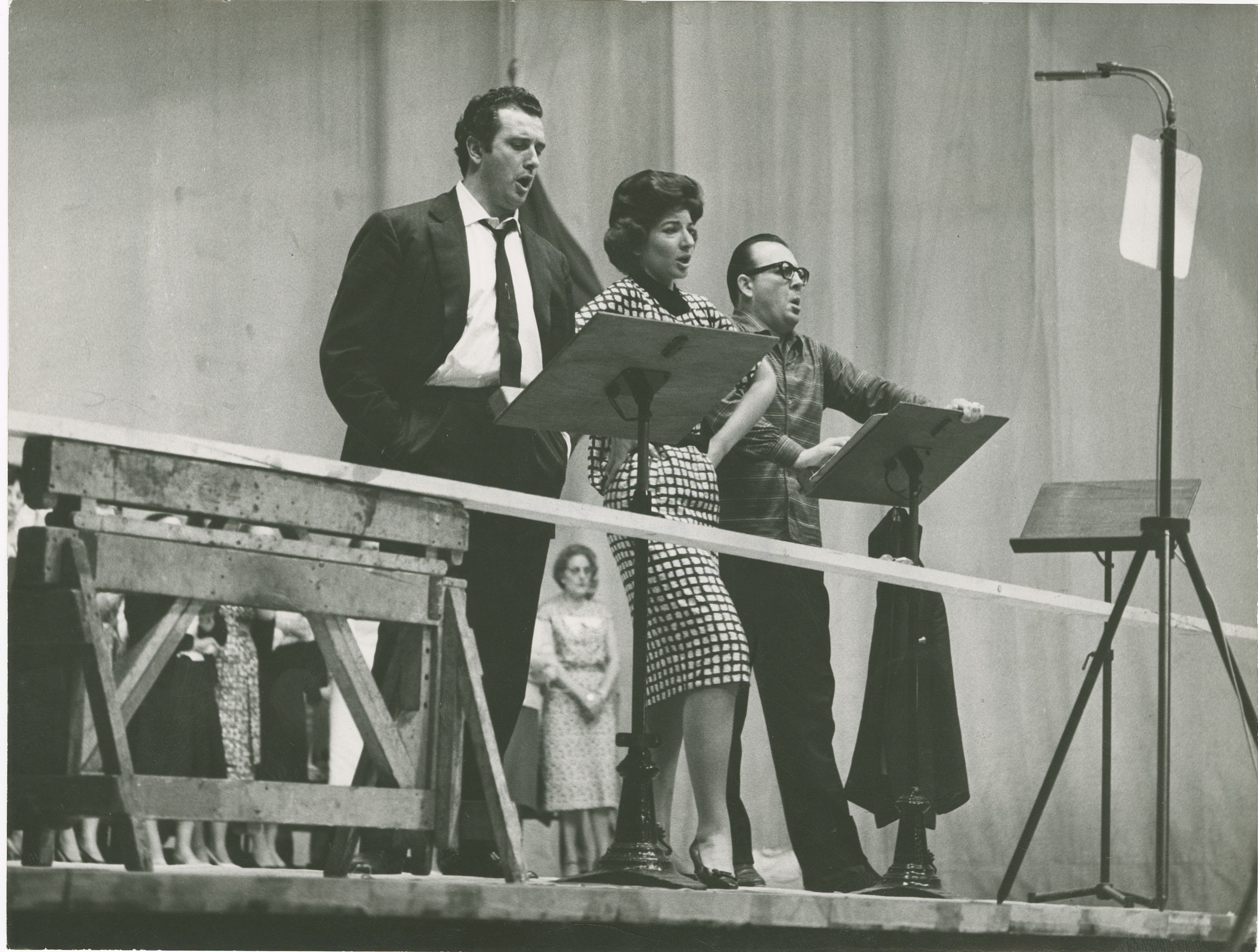
Photo Milan. Teatro alla Scala. Franco Corelli, Maria Callas, and Nicola Zaccaria during the recording of Vincenzo Bellini's opera Norma 1962 - Touring Club Italiano 04 1952

At the insistence of his friend, baritone Carlo Scaravelli, a 25-year-old Franco Corelli sent a letter (dated September 28, 1946) formally requesting admission to the Conservatory in Pesaro. Although Corelli had submitted his voice type as baritone, the conservatory's Maestro Fradelloni immediately pointed out that he was a tenor. Corelli's request for admission was granted, and both Corelli and Scaravelli entered the classes of the aforementioned Umberto Macnez, in his first and only year as teacher at the school. Unfortunately Corelli, still living and working in Ancona, was unable to attend classes regularly, and he was expelled from the conservatory. After a few months of lessons in Ancona with Rita Pavoni, whose "masque placement" method caused Corelli to lose his upper range, he stopped formal studies and sang on his own.

By 1949, Mario Del Monaco had become a star, and meanwhile Carlo Scaravelli had begun studying with Melocchi. Corelli was so impressed both by Del Monaco and by Scaravelli's improvement, that he went to meet Melocchi. According to Corelli, he met and took lessons from Melocchi only a few times. Corelli still could not abandon his work in Ancona, so he devised a plan: when Scaravelli would return to Ancona by train from his lessons in Pesaro, Corelli would meet him at the station; Scaravelli would relay the contents and concepts from the lesson, and then the two would go to the old Corelli family house in Via Mamiani, which was in ruins from the war and was still uninhabited, and there they would practice together. They continued in this fashion for all of 1949, Corelli's own voice improving enormously. This provided Corelli with enough knowledge and technique to begin to pursue what would become his first successes at Spoleto and in Rome.

== Teaching style ==
Melocchi had a very particular way of teaching by emphasizing low laryngeal positioning. Through this method and further emphasis on strong diaphragmatic support, he aimed to develop voices with a darker and more dramatic timbre. These voices were better suited for dramatic opera roles. This method of singing was in contrast with the typical bel canto singing style popular at the time that focused on producing brighter and lighter tones.

His teaching approach has both opponents and proponents. critics warn that it can lead to vocal strain if improperly executed. On the other hand, proponents of his method argue that his technique produces voices with unusual power and intensity.

== Students ==
Tenors
- Aldo Bottion
- Umberto Chiodo
- Augusto Cingolani
- Franco Corelli
- Mario Del Monaco
- Gastone Limarilli
- Giorgio Merighi
- Robleto Merolla (last student)
- Roberto Pagliarani
- Ettore Parmeggiani
- Giovanni Pullini
- Carlo Scaravelli
- Paride Venturi
Baritones
- Africo Baldelli (later a tenor)
- Vincenzo "Enzo" Cecchetelli (later a tenor)
- Edmondo Grandini
- Magini
- Mario Melani
- Saturno Meletti
- Mario Monachesi
- Carlo Scaravelli
Basses
- Febo Pierbattista
- Leodino Ferri
- Guido Santori

== See also ==
- Mario Del Monaco
- Franco Corelli
- Fach
- Liceo Musicale Rossini
- Vocal pedagogy
- Bel canto
