= Selvaggi =

Selvaggi is an Italian surname. Notable people with the surname include:

- Franco Selvaggi (born 1953), Italian footballer
- Mirko Selvaggi (born 1985), Italian cyclist
- Rito Selvaggi (1898–1972), Italian composer
