= Alide Maria Salvetta =

Italian operatic soprano

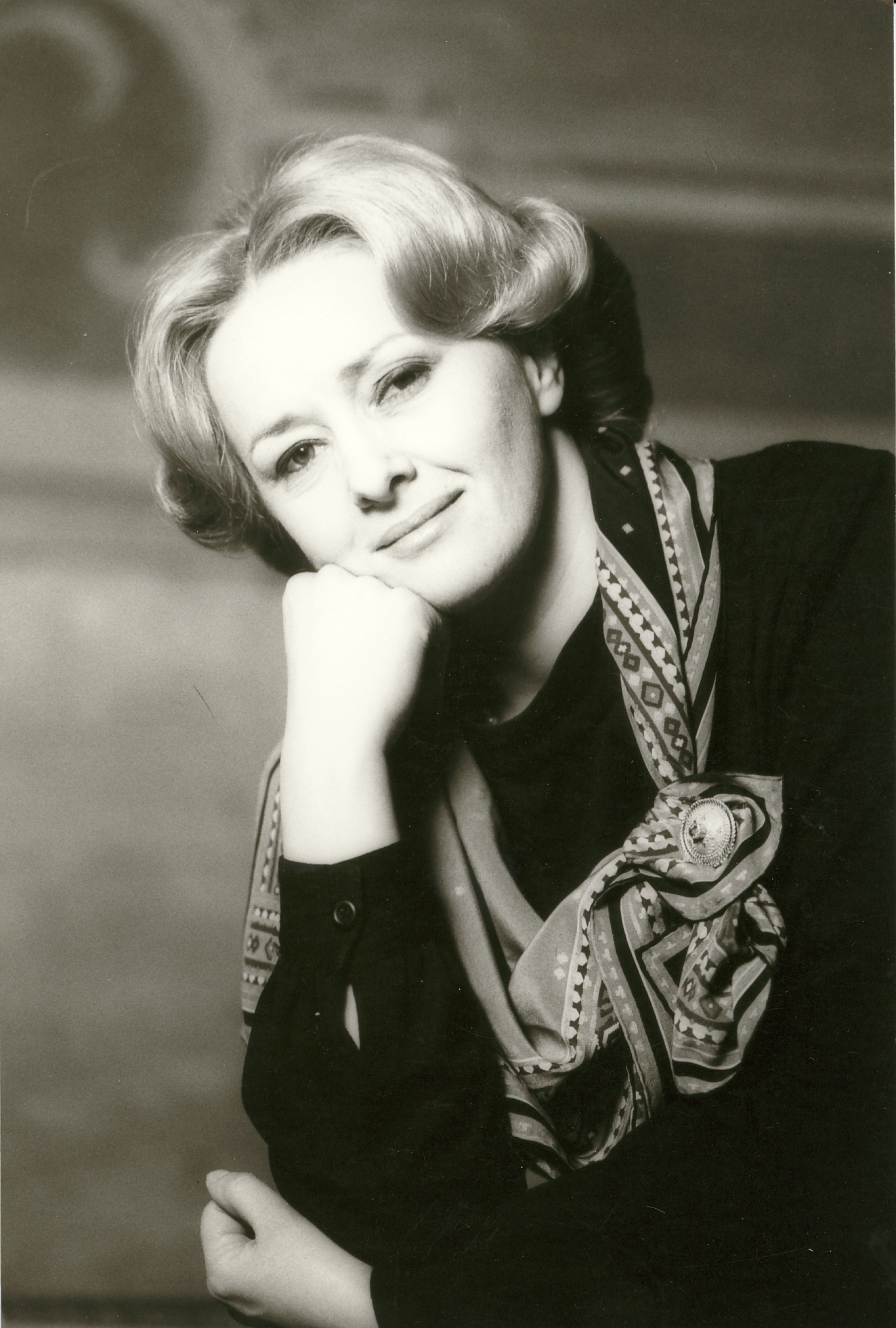
Alide Maria Salvetta

Alide Maria Salvetta (22 March 1941 – 19 March 1991) was an Italian operatic soprano who had an active international career in concerts and operas from the 1960s until her death in 1991.

== Life and career ==
Born in Sarche, Trento, Salvetta was trained at the Conservatorio Claudio Monteverdi in Bolzano where she later taught on the voice faculty. She began performing professionally in the mid-1960s. She sang in concerts at several notable festivals, including the Berlin Klassiktage, the Donaueschingen Festival, the Festival d'Automne in Paris, the Festival dei Due Mondi, and the Holland Festival. Her opera credits included performances at La Fenice, the Maggio Musicale Fiorentino, the Opéra National de Lyon, the Paris Opera, the Teatro Comunale di Bologna, the Teatro dell'Opera di Roma, the Teatro di San Carlo, and the Teatro Regio di Torino. She notably created the role of the Cantatrice/Juliana in the world premiere of Salvatore Sciarrino's Aspern at the Teatro della Pergola in Florence in 1978.

Salvetta was particularly known for her work as a concert soprano and recitalist, and she frequently performed in concerts and recitals with the pianist Antonio Ballista. She was a champion of new music, notably singing the premieres of works by composers Luciano Berio, Paolo Castaldi, Niccolò Castiglioni, Luis De Pablo, Franco Donatoni, Carlo Galante, Alessandro Lucchetti, Giacomo Manzoni, Ennio Morricone, Jan Novák, Carlo Pedini, Salvatore Sciarrino, and Hubert Stuppner. She also appeared in concerts with many notable orchestras, including the London Sinfonietta, the RAI National Symphony Orchestra, and the Spanish National Orchestra among others.

Salvetta died in Trento in 1991 at the age of 49.
