= Antiga =

Antiga is a surname. Notable people with the surname include:

- Giovanni Antiga, Italian organist and composer
- Juan Antiga (1871–1939), Cuban baseball player and official
- Stéphane Antiga (born 1976), French volleyball coach and former player
