= Conservatorio Statale di Musica "Gioachino Rossini" =

Music conservatory in Pesaro, Italy

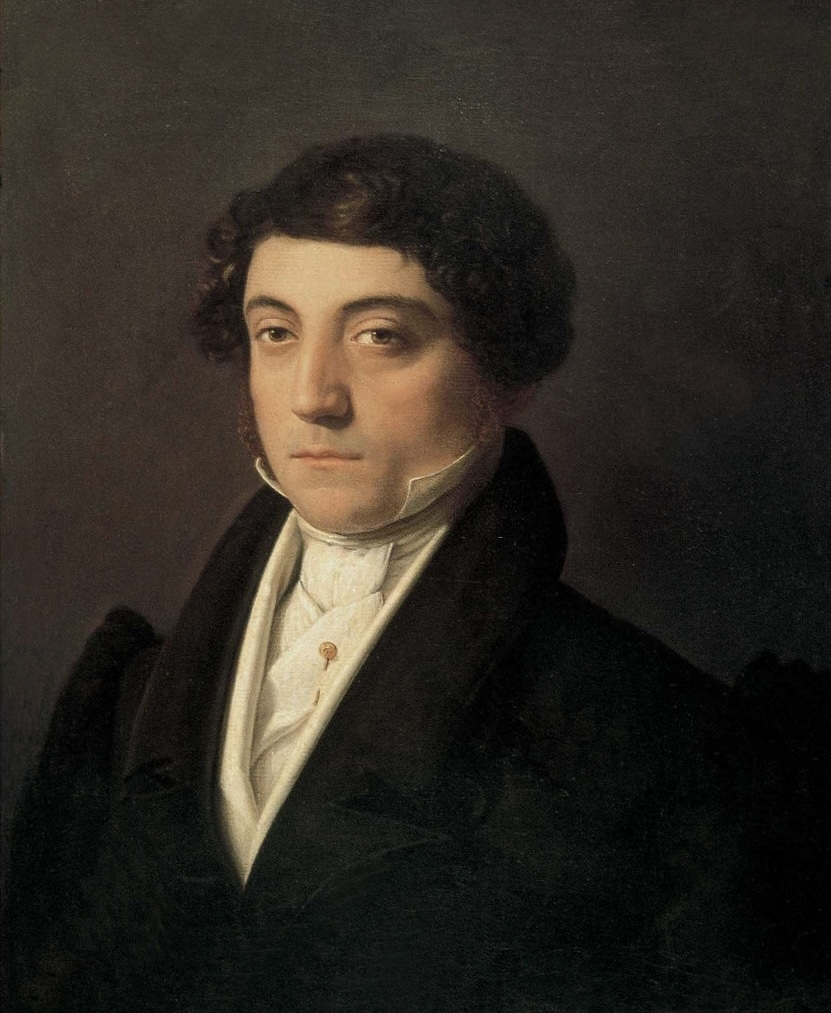
Gioachino Rossini, whose legacy led to the founding of the conservatory

The Conservatorio Statale di Musica "Gioachino Rossini" is a music conservatory in Pesaro, Italy. Founded in 1869 with a legacy from the composer Gioachino Rossini, the conservatory officially opened in 1882 with 67 students and was then known as the Liceo musicale Rossini. By 2010 it had an enrollment of approximately 850 students studying for higher diplomas in singing, instrumental performance, composition, musicology, choral conducting, jazz or electronic music. The conservatory also trains music teachers for secondary schools and holds regular master classes. Its seat is the 18th century Palazzo Olivieri–Machirelli on the Piazza Oliveri in Pesaro. Amongst its past Directors are the composers Carlo Pedrotti, Pietro Mascagni, Riccardo Zandonai and Franco Alfano. Mascagni's opera Zanetto had its world premiere at the conservatory in 1896.

== History ==
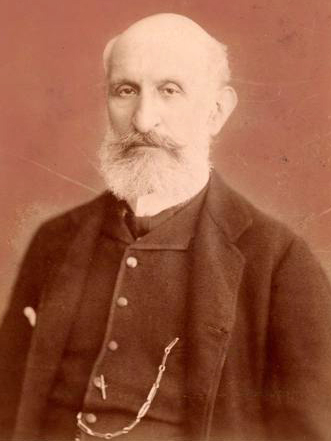
Carlo Pedrotti, the first Director of the conservatory

In his will, Rossini left virtually his entire estate to Pesaro, his native city, for the establishment of a free music school there with the provision that the legacy would only come to the city upon the death of his widow, Olympe Pélissier. In 1869, the year following Rossini's death, the city set up the association which would eventually become the "Liceo musicale Rossini". Olympe Pélissier died in 1878. Four years later, on 5 November 1882, the school opened the doors of its temporary home in the former Convent and Church of San Filippo Neri to the first cohort of 67 students, of whom 25 were enrolled in the choral school. Following the terms of Rossini's will, the school emphasised operatic and choral singing as well as composition. Its first Director, Carlo Pedrotti, was the composer of 17 operas and had previously been the Director of Turin's opera house, the Teatro Regio. He was also a noted voice teacher. Amongst his pupils were the tenors Francesco Tamagno and Alessandro Bonci. During Pedrotti's tenure, the conservatory moved to its permanent home in the Palazzo Olivieri–Machirelli and an auditorium was added which now bears his name. Following Pedrotti's retirement in 1893, the conservatory was without a director until the appointment two years later, of another opera composer, Pietro Mascagni.

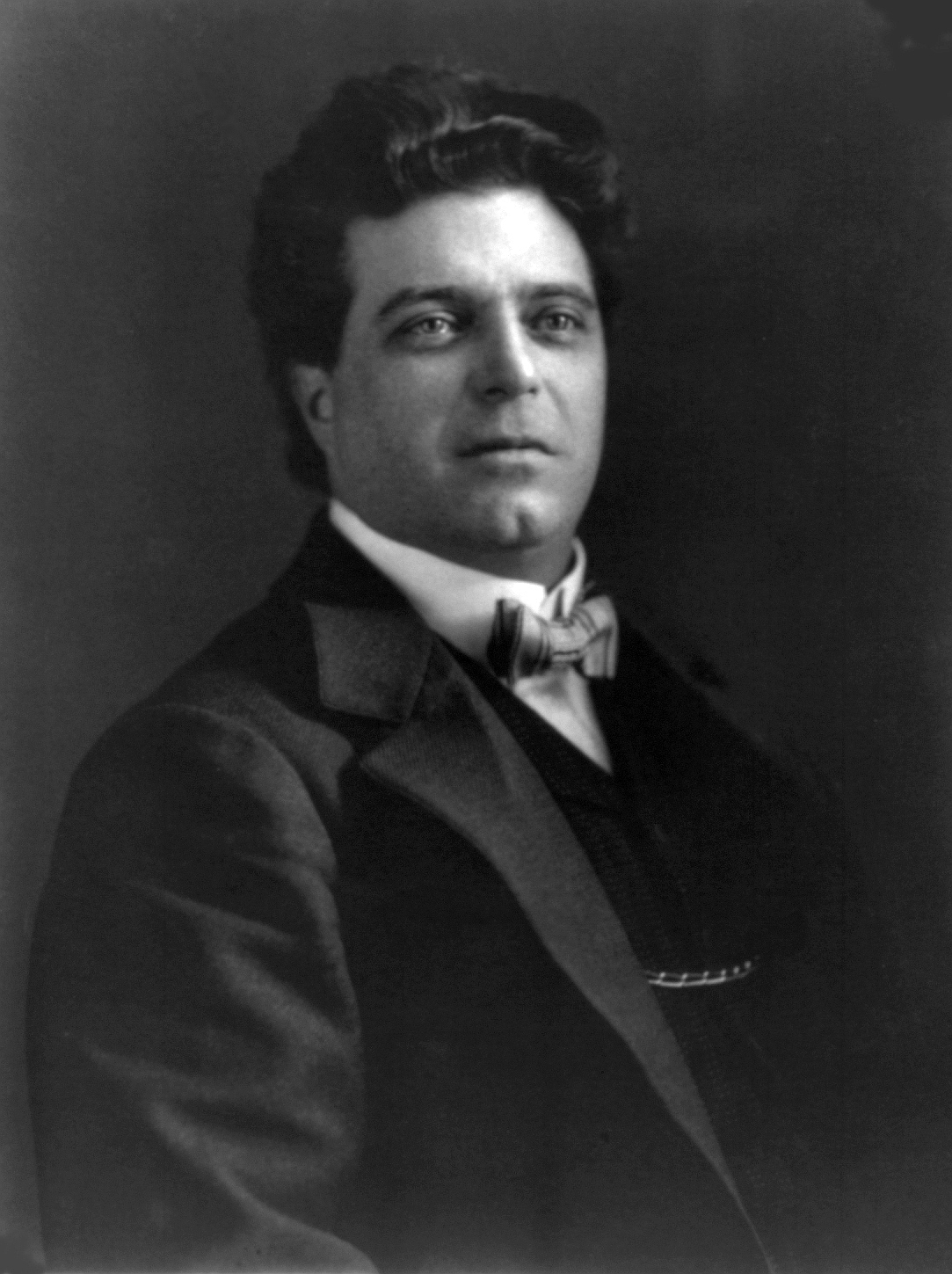
Pietro Mascagni in 1902, his final year as Director of the conservatory

Mascagni took up his post in December 1895. Thanks to Rossini's large legacy, the school was well endowed financially. Mascagni's annual salary was 12,000 lire, more than twice that of the much older Parma Conservatory, and was supplemented with a lavish rent-free apartment in the Palazzo Olivieri–Machirelli. Despite its large endowment, the conservatory had made little progress in raising its prestige during the Pedrotti years and was overshadowed by the big conservatories of Milan, Rome, and Naples and even the smaller Parma Conservatory. It had yet to produce any musicians of note and its enrollment had only increased from the initial 67 students to 73. Its location in a small sea-side town also made it relatively less attractive to the more gifted students and distinguished teachers who tended to prefer the conservatories located in major cultural centres. Mascagni was eager to change the situation and to implement his own ideas about what conservatory education for young people should be. He was opposed to the methods used in many Italian conservatories at the time which taught music largely by rote memorization or as he put it, "like a catechism." Within three years, Mascagni had started the Liceo Symphony Orchestra, which included both students and faculty and was the first permanent orchestra to be established in an Italian conservatory. Mascagni himself conducted their concerts. The orchestra also played in the world premiere of his opera Zanetto, which he had completed shortly before taking up his post. Two students from the conservatory sang the leading roles, and went with Mascagni when he took the opera to La Scala. He also established the first conservatory-published music journal in Italy, La cronaca musicale, as well as the first conservatory course specifically devoted to sacred music. Within four years, the faculty had grown and the enrollment had doubled, as had the number of diplomas awarded.

However, by 1900 Mascagni's relationship with the governing board of the school had begun to sour, partly due to his frequent absences for conducting tours and the preparations for the premiere of his opera Le maschere, and partly due to his abrasive treatment of local dignitaries. He had also run up fairly large deficits in the previous two years, and the board had taken over the financial management of the conservatory. Budget cuts in 1902 led to a student rebellion in support of Mascagni. In turn, the board closed the conservatory for the remainder of the year and sent the students home. On 20 January 1903, Mascagni was officially dismissed from his post. It was another two years before a new director was appointed. In a 1903 address, the president of the governing board recommended that the next director not be an opera composer because an opera composer "in addition to being steeped in liberties, has his mind always focused on his own compositions and all of the interests that flow from them."

In 1905, Amilcare Zanella, a pianist and composer of instrumental music was appointed as Mascagni's successor, a post he was to hold for the next 35 years. With the appointment of Riccardo Zandonai as Director in 1940, the school was once again led by an opera composer. (Zandonai, whose most well-known opera is Francesca da Rimini, had been a pupil of Mascagni at the conservatory.) Under Zandonai, the governance of the Liceo passed from the city of Pesaro to the Italian Ministry of Education. Zandonai was followed by another opera composer, Franco Alfano, who held the Directorship from 1947 to 1950. The conservatory produced or participated in a number of opera productions during the 20th century, including Il barbiere di Siviglia (1916), La gazza ladra (1941), Le Comte Ory (1942) and later Orfeo ed Euridice, Suor Angelica, Gianni Schicchi, Il Signor Bruschino, Francesca da Rimini, and Dido and Aeneas.

In 1999 the school was designated by the Italian government as an "Istituto Superiore di Studi Musicali" (Higher Institute of Musical Studies) with university status, one which it holds to the present day.

== The 21st century conservatory ==
Following a vote by the faculty, the pianist Ludovico Bramanti became the new director of the conservatory in 2014, succeeding another pianist, Maurizio Tarsetti, who had held the post since 2008. In the academic year 2009/2010, the conservatory had an enrollment of approximately 850 students. Of those, 821 were Italian with the remainder from 26 other countries as far afield as Peru, Nepal and Kazakhstan. The conservatory offers bachelor and master diplomas in singing, instrumental performance, composition, musicology, choral conducting, jazz and electronic music. It also trains music teachers for secondary schools and holds regular master classes and seminars. Admission to the diploma courses is based on an entrance examination with five €1000 scholarships awarded annually by the Fondazione Rossini.

Fresco by Gianandrea Lazzarini in the Palazzo Olivieri–Machirelli

The conservatory has three specialised research laboratories: 20th Century and Contemporary Music; Early Music; and Electronic and Experimental Music (LEMS), which was established in 1971 by the Italian composer Aldo Clementi. There are several permanent ensembles in which both students and faculty participate, including the Symphony Orchestra, Wind Orchestra, Jazz Orchestra, Saxophone Ensemble, and Gregorian Choir. The ensembles and soloists perform a variety of public concerts in Pesaro and the surrounding region during the year, including those celebrating Christmas, Easter, Ferragosto, May Day, Festa della Repubblica, and Saint Cecilia's Day. The conservatory also co-produces Progetto Orfeo, an international university festival of opera and musical theatre, and runs two national music competitions, Harpsichord (established in 1991) and Bassoon (established in 2004).

== Palazzo Olivieri–Machirelli ==
The Palazzo Olivieri–Machirelli on the Piazza Olivieri is home to both the conservatory and the Fondazione Rossini, a centre for Rossini scholarship which organizes the annual Rossini Opera Festival in Pesaro. The neo-classical palazzo with its monumental central staircase was built in 1794 for Annibale Olivieri, a member of a noble Pesarese family. It was designed by Gianandrea Lazzarini, who also painted the frescos adorning several of the ceremonial rooms, now often used for chamber music concerts. It includes a gallery of illustrious men and women from Pesaro's history. The building was acquired by the city of Pesaro in 1884, initially to house the Biblioteca Oliveriana and its collections, and gradually adapted by 1892 for use as a music conservatory, including an extension to accommodate an 800-seat concert hall, now known as the Sala Pedrotti. Rectangular in shape with a raised stage, stalls and two tiers of balconies, the Sala Pedrotti is one of the few "shoebox" concert halls in Italy and is known for its good acoustics. It was inaugurated on 29 February 1892 with a concert conducted by Carlo Pedrotti to celebrate the 100th anniversary of Rossini's birth.

In addition to the concert hall, teaching rooms, and offices, the palazzo houses the conservatory's collection of antique and exotic musical instruments and its library. The conservatory library, with 45,000 volumes as well as rare manuscripts and documents dating back to 1500, is one of the largest music libraries in Italy. The "Tempietto Rossiniano" (Little Temple to Rossini) on the piano nobile of the building has a ceiling decorated with Neo-Pompeian scenes of Ancient Rome. It contains many items that belonged to the composer as well as the autograph scores of his Petite messe solennelle and six operas, most of which he composed for the Teatro San Carlo in Naples: Elisabetta, regina d'Inghilterra, Otello, Armida, La donna del lago, Maometto II, and Adina. A large bronze statue of Rossini by Carlo Marochetti is situated in the building's main internal courtyard.

== Faculty members and alumni ==
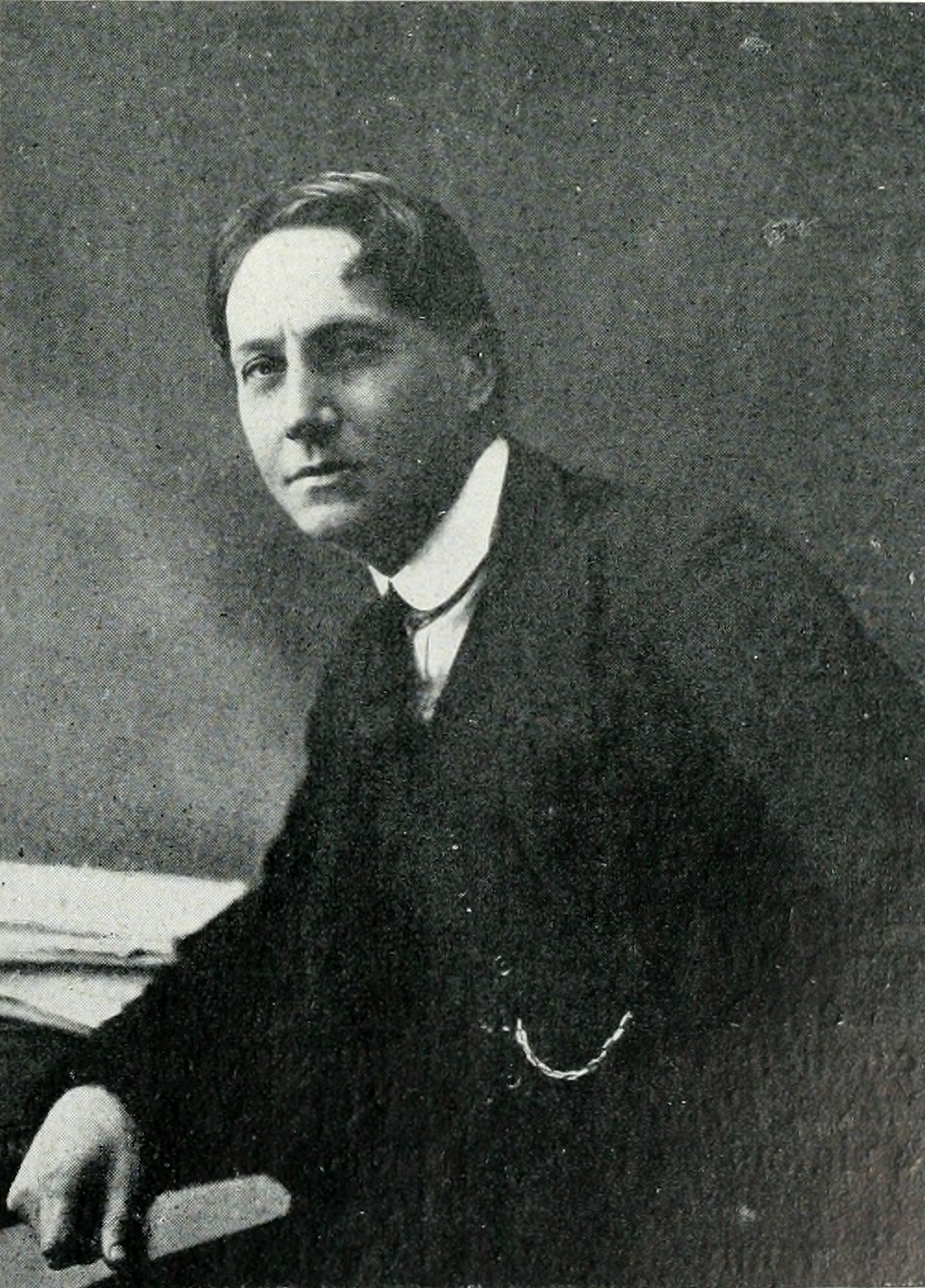
Composer Franco Alfano, Director of the conservatory from 1947 to 1950

=== Faculty ===
- Marcello Abbado – conductor and composer (Director of the conservatory 1966–1973)
- Franco Alfano – composer (Director of the conservatory 1947–1950)
- Mario Bertoncini – pianist and composer
- Riccardo Brengola – violinist
- Aldo Clementi – composer
- Giulio Fara – musicologist
- Lino Liviabella – composer and pianist (Director of the conservatory 1953–1959)
- Elvira Mari-Casazza – opera singer
- Pietro Mascagni – composer (Director of the conservatory 1895–1902)
- Carmen Melis – opera singer
- David Monacchi – composer (Professor of Electroacoustics, 2009–present; also an alumnus)
- Luigi Mostacci – pianist
- Carlo Pedrotti – composer (Director of the conservatory 1882–1892)
- Carlo Pedini – composer
- Armando Pierucci – composer (also an alumnus)
- Boris Porena – composer
- Rito Selvaggi – composer (Director of the conservatory 1959–1963, also an alumnus)
- Bruno Tommaso – jazz composer and double-bass player
- Antonio Veretti – composer (Director of the conservatory 1950–1952)
- Riccardo Zandonai – composer (Director of the conservatory 1940–1944, also an alumnus)
- Amilcare Zanella – composer and pianist (Director of the conservatory 1905–1940)

=== Alumni ===
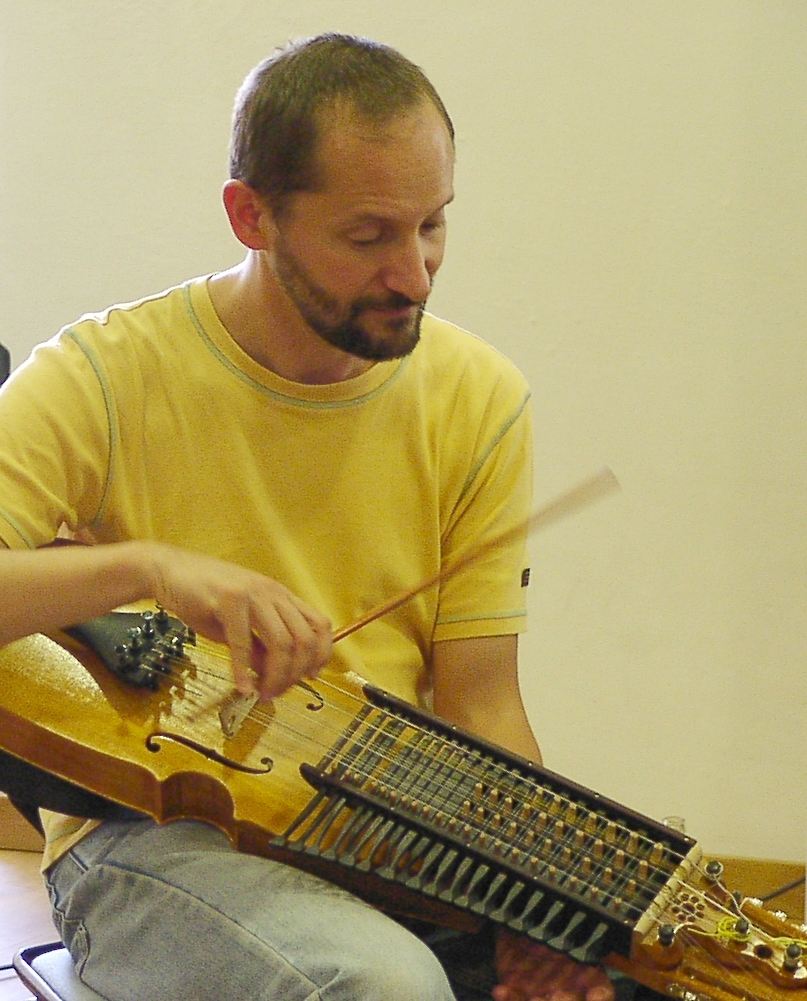
Alumnus Marco Ambrosini with his nyckelharpa

This list includes both graduates and musicians who are known to have studied for a time at the conservatory.

- Giuseppe Albanese – pianist
- Marco Ambrosini – composer and nyckelharpist
- Andrea Angelini – organist and conductor
- Giovanni Antiga – composer
- Georgi Atanasov – composer
  Renata Tebaldi who studied singing at the conservatory under Carmen Melis
- Giuliano Bernardi – opera singer
- Alessandro Bonci – opera singer
- Celestina Boninsegna – opera singer
- Franco Corelli – opera singer
- Mario del Monaco – opera singer
- Gioconda de Vito – violinist
- Carlo Domeniconi – guitarist and composer
- Mara Galassi – harpist and musicologist
- Josip Hatze – composer
- Agide Jacchia – conductor
- Luca Lombardi – composer
- Gianluca Luisi – pianist
- Riz Ortolani – composer
- Enrico Pace – pianist
- Marcella Pobbe – opera singer
- Luca Chiarabini - clarinettista
- Francesco Balilla Pratella – composer and musicologist
- Sergio Rendine – composer
- Primo Riccitelli – composer
- Renata Tebaldi – opera singer
- Domenico Viglione Borghese - opera singer

== Sources ==
- Angelucci, Alberto, "Il Conservatorio di Pesaro: L'Università della musica", Lo Specchio della Città, March 2004 (in Italian). Accessed 19 October 2010.
- Bartolucci, Patrizia, "Maurizio Tarsetti batte 5 candidati: il Conservatorio ha un nuovo direttore", Il Resto del Carlino, 14 March 2008 (in Italian). Accessed 19 October 2010.
- Fausti, P., Farina, A., and Pompoli, R., "The acoustics and restoration of "Salone Pedrotti" in Pesaro", Proceedings of the International Commission for Acoustics Congress, Trondheim, 26–30 June 1995, Vol.II, pp. 453–456
- Mallach, Alan, Pietro Mascagni and his operas, Northeastern University Press, 2002. ISBN 1-55553-524-0
- Peri, Nino, Dipinto murale di Gianandrea Lazzarini in palazzo Machirelli Olivieri di Pesaro, Fondazione Scavolini. (in Italian). Accessed 19 October 2010.
- Pironti, Alberto & Costa, Roberta (2001). "Veretti, Antonio". In Sadie, Stanley & Tyrrell, John (eds.). The New Grove Dictionary of Music and Musicians (2nd ed.). London: Macmillan. ISBN 978-1-56159-239-5.
- Senici, Emanuele, The Cambridge Companion to Rossini, Cambridge University Press, 2004. ISBN 0-521-00195-1
- Touring club italiano, Pesaro e Urbino e provincia: Gabicce, Fano e la costa Gradara e il Montefeltro, Touring Editore, 2002. ISBN 88-365-2432-X
- Waterhouse, John C. G. (2001). "Zanella, (Castore) Amilcare". In Sadie, Stanley; Tyrrell, John (eds.). The New Grove Dictionary of Music and Musicians (2nd ed.). London: Macmillan. ISBN 978-1-56159-239-5.
