= Paolo Ugoletti =

Italian composer (born 1956)

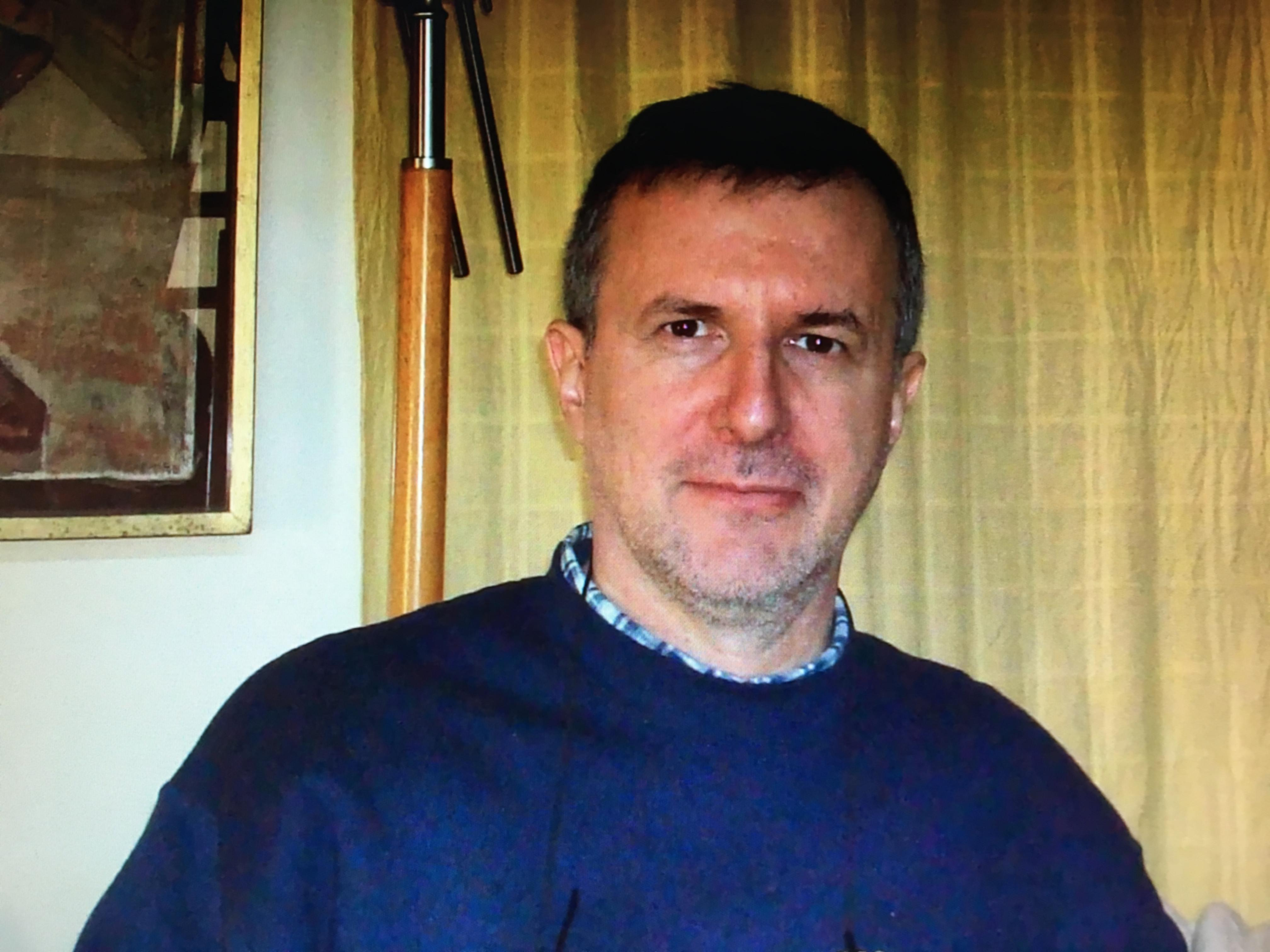
Paolo Ugoletti

Paolo Ugoletti (born 7 June 1956) is an Italian composer.

== Biography ==
Composer Paolo Ugoletti was born in Brescia on 7 June 1956. He studied composition in 1973 at the Conservatory of Brescia with Giancarlo Facchinetti and Giovanni Ugolini and then at the Conservatory "Giuseppe Verdi" in Milan with Giacomo Manzoni. From 1977 to 1979 Ugoletti attended Franco Donatoni's composition course at the Accademia Musicale Chigiana in Siena where he obtains the diploma of merit.

Since 1979 Ugoletti's music has been performed by soloists such as Georg Mönch, Ciro Scarponi, Antonio Ballista, Sandro Gorli, Giuseppe Garbarino, Claudia Antonelli, Massimiliano Damerini and Piero Bonaguri. In the eighties Paolo adhered to the Italian Neo-Romanticism, albeit in a more nuanced manner than its founders [2].

In 1980, after obtaining a diploma in composition, Ugoletti spent a short period in Stockholm where he metScandinavian composers and musicians. He began his career as a teacher of composition at the Conservatorio Statale di Musica "Gioachino Rossini", Conservatorio Giovanni Battista Martini and Parma Conservatory. In 1987 Ugoletti was "Composer in residence" at the University of California Santa Cruz.

In 1989 Ugoletti became a professor of composition at the Conservatory "Luca Marenzio" of Brescia; at the same time he started a long-lasting collaboration with the "Sagra musicale umbra". It commissioned works such as the Gloria of the Missa Solemnis Resurrectionis, premiered in Rome on the occasion of the Jubilee 2000 and the completion of the Lacrimosa and the composition of the Amen of Mozart's Requiem in 2002.

In 1989 Ugoletti wrote chamber and solo compositions for Radio France and for the "Cabrillo Festival" (California). In the early nineties (1990–93) he dedicated himself to the study of Irish traditional music which, in the following years, inspired the composition of numerous works linked to the Celtic world and expressiveness. Since 2000 he has been composing numerous works using soloists, choir and orchestra and inserting instruments of other musical genres: uilleann pipes, tin whistle, Celtic harp, bass and electric guitar, electronic keyboards, drums.

Since 2003 Ugoletti has been collaborating on projects of the painter Rinaldo Turati realizing compositions as integrated parts of the installations of the artist

Ugoletti's compositions are published by the publishing houses Ricordi, Suvini Zerboni, Sonzogno, UtOrpheus, andKelidon Edizioni.

== Compositions ==
=== Vocal music ===
- Scarpette in fuga v. e pf.
- A nascondino v.e pf.
- Three irish songs v. e chit.
- A white rose v. e chit.
- Proverbi da G. Ungaretti v. e chit.
- Mor of Cloine v. e chit.
- Feary song v. e chit.
- Dedicato v.e pf (Suvini Zerboni)
- Tre canzoni d’amore da Jmenez v.e pf. (Suvini Zerboni)
- Visor da A. Strindberg v.e chit.
- To neighborhood of pause 7 poesie di E:Dickinson
- Ariette da D. Abeni v. e pf. (Suvini Zerboni)
- Notturni da Strindberg v. e pf. (Suvini Zerbini)
- Indian Hymn da Lou Harrison v. e violoncello

=== Choral music ===
- Laudate Dominum for mixed choir and chamber orchestra
- Three songs for male choir
- Benedica es tu for soprano, mixed choir, organ and percussion
- Rorate coeli for mixed choir and string orchestra
- Gloria for tenor, choir and orchestra (Sonzogno)
- Compieta for mixed choir
- Tre canzoni for mixed choir
- Dum medium silentium for male choir
- Laudate Dominum per coro di voci bianche e quartetto d’archi
- Magnificat for eight-voice choir
- Sine verbis pfor female choir
- Who is God for male choir
- Missa Gadelica for mixed choir, flute, organ and string orchestra
- Cantata dei grandi alberi for soprano, male vocal quartet, pianoforte and string orchestra

=== Orchestral music ===
- Doctor Faustroll soldat du Je per baritone e orchestra (Suvini Zerboni)
- Grand Jeu per orchestra sinfonica
- Poeme feerique per pianoforte e orchestra (Suvini Zerbini)
- Argo o l’isola d’amore festa teatrale per voci coro e orchestra
- Concerto per pianoforte e orchestra d’archi (Suvini Zerbini)
- Serenata per chitarra e orchestra
- Poemetto d’estate per trio d’archi, pianoforte e orchestra d’archi (Suvin Zerbini)
- Italian Gamelan per orch.
- Come Venere sorse dal mare ouverture per orch.
- Partita per saxofono e orch. d’archi
- Fanfara per pianoforte e orchestra di fiati
- Sweet per pianoforte, saxofono, el.bass, batteria e orchestra di fiati

=== Chamber music ===
- Funky duo per clarinetto e pf
- Bianche fontane di luna per 2 fl., 2vlini, clavicembalo
- Serenata per pianoforte e quartetto d’archi (Suvini Zerboni)
- Happy dances per arpa
- Al suo orologio in una notte insonne per arpa (Suvini Zerbini)
- Sulla soglia dell’alveare per pianoforte e quintetto d’archi
- Country Dances per ensemble di percussioni (Suvini Zerboni)
- Ballata per fl, cl, vl, vla, cello, pianoforte e percussioni (Suvini Zerboni)
- Finale per cl, corno di bassetto e pf
- Scherzo per vl, cello e pf. (Suvini Zerboni)
- Spiritual runes messa per sax soprano e organo
- Dream play per voce, fl, ob, cl, tromba, corno, trio d’archi, pf e percussione
- Set dance per 4 percussionisti a tastiera
- Gli Orti di Epicuro per gruppo di fiati e pianoforte (Suvini Zerboni)
- Affettuosi saluti per fl, ob, fag, trba, trombone, vlno e cbsso (Suvini Zerboni)
- Apparizioni Fuggitive per archi e celesta (Ricordi)
- Con Minime Ali sonatina per violino e pianoforte (Suvini Zerboni)
- Concertino per trio d’archi, fl,, cl, percussioni e pianoforte (Suvini Zerboni)
- In meum cor per voce, violoncello, pianoforte e percussioni
- Blessed changes per 2 fl e cl basso
- Northern lights per fl, cl, chitarra elettrica e pianoforte
- Southern lights per vl, cl e pianoforte (Kelidon edizioni)
- Facing north per vibrafono e marimba
- For hard angels per quartetto di saxofoni
- Partita per 2 tastiere
- Ecstatic couples per 2 pianoforti, 2 tastiere e chitarra elettrica
- Irish pilgrimage per 4 percussionisti
- Meadbh’s waves per 10 strumenti: s. sax, el. guitar, quintetto d’archi, pianoforte, el.bass e batteria
- Icebreaker per saxofono e 2 pianoforti
- Invenzioni delle Mura per 2 voci femminili, trio d’archi, sax soprano, pianoforte e batteria
- Due Canzoni taiwanesi per soprano, pianoforte e quartetto d’archi
- Concerto Festivo per bass trombone e orchestra d’archi

== Bibliography ==
- J.R. Jimenez, Ugoletti, Paolo, in Dizionario Enciclopedico della Musica e dei Musicisti DEUMM, Unione Tipografico - Editrice Torinese UTET, 1988, ISBN 978-88-02-04396-8.
- AA.VV., Ugoletti, in Enciclopedia della musica Garzanti, Garzanti, 1996, ISBN 88-11-50467-8.
- Renzo Cresti, UGOLETTI, Paolo, in Enciclopedia Italiana dei Compositori Contemporanei, Pagano-Tolmino, 1999, ISBN 978-88-87463-07-1.
- Renzo Cresti, Ipertesto di Storia della Musica, Feeria, 2004, ISBN 978-88-87699-65-4.

== External References ==
Opere di Paolo Ugoletti], openMLOL, Horizons Unlimited srl. (EN), at the International Music Score Library Project, Project Petrucci LLC. (EN), at Discogs, Zink Media. , at Conservatorio di Musica "L. Marenzio", Brescia. , at Milano Musica. , at UT Orpheus. , at Composition Today. EN), at Free Choral Music.
