= Enrico Polo =

Italian composer (1868–1953)

Enrico Polo (18 November 1868 in Parma – 3 December 1953 in Milan) was an Italian violinist, composer and pedagogue.

== Biography ==
Polo was admitted to the Royal School of Music in Parma (now the Conservatorio di Musica Arrigo Boito) in 1879, studying violin and composition. He graduated in June 1887 with honours and received the Barbacini Prize for outstanding graduate of his class. He was a close friend of orchestra director Arturo Toscanini from the earliest years of study in Parma. In the fall of 1887, Toscanini was to conduct Giuseppe Verdi's I Lombardi alla prima crociata and requested Polo to play the lengthy violin solo at the end of Act III.

In 1893, with the financial support of Count Stefano Sanvitale, Polo went to Berlin to study with Joseph Joachim. He returned to Italy in 1895 and was appointed Toscanini's concertmaster at Teatro Regio in Turin. He married Toscanini's wife's sister.

In 1903 Polo was appointed Professor of Violin at the Milan Conservatory where he was an influential teacher for more than thirty years. In 1906, he founded the Quartetto Polo along with violinist Costantino Soragna, violist Guglielmo "Willy" Koch and cellist Camillo Moro. The quartet performed to great acclaim in Milan and throughout Europe. During World War I, Soragna was replaced by Michelangelo Abbado, a student of Polo at the Conservatory, and Moro by Riccardo Malipiero. After the War, the quartet continued its activities until 1922 when it disbanded for financial reasons. In 1910, Polo and pianist Enrico Consolo gave the first Italian performance of the complete cycle of Ludwig van Beethoven's ten Violin Sonatas.

In subsequent years, Polo dedicated himself entirely to teaching. His motto was: "L'amore è il primo segreto del buon insegnamento; non basta il metodo, ci vuole il cuore" (Love is the first secret of good teaching; it's not just the method, it takes heart). He donated his books and scores to the library of the Milan Conservatory.

Polo composed several important pedagogical volumes, as well as transcribed, arranged and edited many works for violin and viola.

== Selected works ==
Chamber music

- Rêverie for violin and piano, Op. 6

Pedagogical

- Esercizi per violino, applicati alle scale maggiori e minori (Exercises for Violin, Applied to the Major and Minor Scales), Op. 5 (1909)

Parte I: Esercizi per lo studio dei trilli, gruppetti, mordenti, ecc.
Parte II: Esercizi per meccanismo dell'arco, esercizi a note doppie

- Il meccanismo delle cinque prime posizioni del violino (The Mechanism of the First Five Positions of the Violin), Op. 7 (1905)
- 12 Studi di tecnica per violino (Technical Studies for Violin) (1914); adapted for viola by the composer
- Primi esercizi per l'avviamento allo studio del violino (First Exercises for the Study of the Violin) (1918)
- 30 Studi a corde doppie, progressivi dalla prima alla terza posizione (30 Double Chord Studies, in Progression from First to Third Positions) for violin (1922); adapted for viola by the composer (1924)
- Tecnica fondamentale delle scale e degli arpeggi in tutti i toni (Fundamental Technique of Scale and Arpeggio Playing in All Keys) for violin (1930)
- 25 Studi progressivi fino alla quinta posizione (25 Progressive Studies up to Fifth Position) for violin (1940)
- 3 Studi-Sonate (3 Etude-Sonatas) for viola (1950)
- Studi tecnici per viola (Technical Studies for Viola)
