= Rito Selvaggi =

Italian composer

Rito Selvaggi

Rito Selvaggi (22 May 1898 – 19 May 1972) was an Italian composer, pianist, conductor, poet, and educator. He composed numerous works, including operas, oratorios and sacred music as well symphonic and chamber music. He also served as the director of the music conservatories in Palermo, Parma, and Pesaro.

== Biography ==
Selvaggi was born in Noicàttaro in the Province of Bari, the third of six children. He showed an early talent for music, especially the piano, and in 1910, his family sent him to the Rossini Conservatory in Pesaro, where he studied under Amilcare Zanella. After graduating from the conservatory, he continued his piano studies with Ferruccio Busoni in Bologna and made his Paris debut in 1913. His career as a concert pianist was cut short by World War I, when he served as a lieutenant in the Italian Army from 1915 to 1918. After the war, he concentrated his musical activities primarily on conducting and composing. He was the co-director (with Tullio Serafin) of the Teatro Regio in Turin and the Théâtre des Champs-Élysées in Paris from 1918 to 1922 and toured internationally as a conductor from 1923 to 1927.

From 1929 to 1943 he was also the artistic director for symphonic music for Italian National Radio, where he championed the works of contemporary Italian composers, including Pizzetti, Malipiero, and Alfano. During the course of his career, he served as the director of the Palermo Conservatory (1938–1943), the Parma Conservatory (1956–1959), and the Rossini Conservatory in Pesaro (1959–1963). Selvaggi spent the last years of his life in his villa at Zoagli in the Province of Genoa where he died in 1972 at the age of 74.

== Selected works ==
- La maggiolata veneziana (The Venetian May Festival), opera in three acts to a libretto by the composer and Emanuele Cecconi, premiered Teatro San Carlo, Naples, 26 April 1929
- Estasi di San Francesco (The Ecstasy of Saint Francis), oratorio for soloists, chorus, orchestra and organ, premiered, Teatro Regio, Turin, 1930
- Stabat Mater, premiered Teatro Massimo, Palermo, 1942 (later broadcast on Radio Vaticana)
- Santa Caterina da Siena, la sposa di Fontebranda (Saint Catherine of Siena, the Bride of Frontebranda), oratorio in commemoration of the 600th anniversary of the birth of Catherine of Siena, broadcast on RAI, 1947

== Sources ==
- Casaglia, Gherardo (2005). "Rito Selvaggi". L'Almanacco di Gherardo Casaglia (in Italian).
- Conservatorio Statale di Musica "Gioachino Rossini", I Direttori (in Italian). Accessed 23 October 2010.
- Sanvitale, Francesco, Tosti, EDT srl, 1991. ISBN 88-7063-094-3
- Selvaggi Jr., Rito, Rito Selvaggi: Biografia (in Italian). Accessed 23 October 2010.

Media related to Rito Selvaggi at Wikimedia Commons
