= Gianfranco Masini =

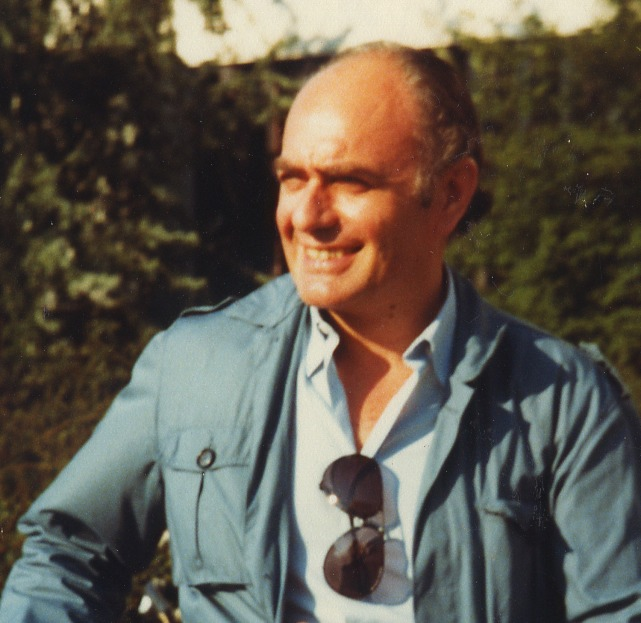
- Born: 26 November 1937; Reggio Emilia, Italy
- Died: 18 June 1993 (aged 55); Reggio Emilia, Italy
- Occupation: Classical conductor
- Years active: 1966–1993

Gianfranco Masini (26 November 1937 – 18 June 1993) was an Italian orchestra conductor, primarily known for conducting opera. During the course of his career he was a principal conductor at the Teatro Lirico Giuseppe Verdi in Trieste and at the Arena di Verona Festival. He appeared in numerous opera houses in Europe and North America as a guest conductor and was the principal guest conductor of the Stadttheater Bonn in 1990. At the time of his death, he was the principal conductor and artistic director of Montpellier Opera.

Masini was born in Reggio Emilia, Italy and studied composition and conducting in the conservatories of Parma and Bologna, followed by further studies in Vienna with Hermann Scherchen. He made his conducting debut in 1966 with La bohème at the Teatro Municipale di Reggio Emilia. In addition to his live performances, Masini made several full-length opera recordings for Deutsche Grammophon, Decca, Philips and Ricordi. His last performances were conducting La forza del destino at Montpellier Opera in early June 1993. He resigned for health reasons shortly thereafter and died in his native city at the age of 55. In 2013, the 20th anniversary of his death, the auditorium at the Achille Peri Conservatory in Reggio Emilia was named in his honour.
