= Ailem Carvajal Gómez =

Cuban composer, pianist and professor

Ailem Carvajal Gómez (Havana, November 22, 1972), is a Cuban composer, pianist and professor.

== Academic background ==
Ailem Carvajal began to study music in the Leonardo Luberta Conservatory at Isla de la Juventud and at a later time she continued at Alejandro García Caturla Conservatory in Havana.

In 1987 she went to the School of Music at the National Art Schools (Cuba), where she studied piano with professor Andrés Alén and obtained a degree in Musical Pedagogy in 1966. At a later time, carvajal studied Musical Composition at the Instituto Superior de Arte in Havana with professors Carlos Fariñas and Harold Gramatges, and finally she received a diploma of Musical Composition at the Arrigo Boito Conservatory in Parma, Italy, with professor Luigi Abbate. While she was studying, Carvajal attended numerous Musical Composition and Music Informatic seminars, offered by professors such as Julio Estrada, Thomas Kessler, Luigi Abbate, Edgar Landia, Stefano Scodanibbio, Cristóbal Halffter, Tomás Marco, Mauricio Sotelo, Alvise Vidolin and Giovanni Cospito. Ailem Carvajal has received several scholarships in subjects such as Musical Composition, Music Pedagogy and Informatics, in institutions such as Musikhochschule (Basel) Switzerland; Villafranca del Bierzo (León) and the Centro d'Arte Contemporánea "Reina Sofía" (Madrid), Spain; the Erasmus Conservatory of Music in Conservatorio Erasmus de Música (Szeged), Hungary and Conservatorio di Musica Arrigo Boito (Parma), Italy. Ailem Carvajal has established her permanent residency in Italy since 1997.

== Composer ==
Ailem Carvajal participated as a composer in international symposiums and festivals such as: the III Symposium and International Festival "Donne in Musica" in Rome, Italy, in 1998; the Dell'Aquila Electro-acoustic Music Festival in 2001; the Est-Ouest Festival (Turin, Italy); the New Music Miami ISCM Festival and the Q-ba Cuban music Festival in the Netherlands. The compositions of Carvajal have been published by Arte Tripharia, Periferia Music (Spain) and Pizzicato Verlag Helvetia (Switzerland); and performed in festivals and radio programs in the United States, the Netherlands, Spain, Italy, Ireland, Venezuela, Mexico and Argentina, among other countries.

Ailem Carvajal has received commissions from prestigious cultural institutions such as La Scala Theater in Milan, "Reina Sofía Contemporary Art Center" (Madrid, Spain), the "New Music Miami Festival", the "Williams Ensemble" in the United States and the "Insomnio" Ensemble from Amsterdam.

Carvajal is an active member of the National Union of Writers and Artists of Cuba (UNEAC) and founding member of the Society for the development of contemporary music (SODAMC). her pieces have been recorded by Periferia Music (Barcelona); Pizzicato Verlag Helvetia (Suiza); Sello Autor y Musica y Educacion Magazine (Madrid), Rey Rodriguez Productions (Hamburg), RYCY Productions (Los Angeles), Tutto Musik (Berlín), Parma Infanzia y City Hall of Parma (Italy).

== Professor ==
Ailem Carvajal has worked as professor of harmony, polyphony and orchestration at the Amadeo Roldán Conservatory and the Instituto Superior de Arte (Havana). Carvajal is the founder and director of the organization Musicalia Children, established in 1999 and dedicated to the musical education of children and youth, as well as to the promotion of the hispanic children music in presentations and concerts.

== Pianist ==
Carvajal has participated as pianist, composer and arranger with the Trío Siguaraya, which promotes Cuban and Latin-American classical music; as well as in the "E.s. Project", which interprets sound as evolution, dialog and mutation, elaborated through the improvisation and electro-acoustic media.

== Awards and recognitions ==
Ailem Carvajal has received awards in composition contests sponsored bu institutions such as the School of Music of the National Art Schools (Cuba), the Instituto Superior de Arte (Havana), and the National Union of Writers and Artists of Cuba (UNEAC) (1993). In 2004 she received a first prize at the International Contest "Women Composers" from Venice, Italy, with a piece for flute titled "En Tres", published at a later time by Pizzicato Verlag Helvetia, from Udine (Italy).

In 2012, Carvajal received a "Cintas Award", a recognition established by Cuban philanthropist Oscar B. Cintas in the United States; as well as a first prize in the classical music category in the CUBADISCO International Fair, during 2013.

== See also ==
Music of Cuba
