= Giovanni Rossi (composer) =

Giovanni Rossi (August 5, 1828 – March 31, 1886) was an Italian composer, conductor, organist, and music educator. He was director of the Parma Conservatory from 1864 through 1874. An opera conductor, he was a conductor at the Teatro Regio di Parma before working as director of both the Teatro Carlo Felice and the Liceo Musicale in Genoa from 1874 until his death in 1886.

== Life and career ==
Giovanni Rossi was born in Fidenza (then called Borgo San Donnino), Italy on August 5, 1828. His father was an organist and he was trained as a musician by him before entering the Milan Conservatory in 1846. He studied at the conservatory through 1848. After completing his studies he became maestro concertatore at the Teatro Regio di Parma. In 1852 he was appointed organist of the court chapel in Parma. From 1864 through 1874 he was director of the Parma Conservatory; having taught organ on the faculty of that school since 1852.

Rossi was appointed music director of the Teatro Carlo Felice; a post he held from 1874 until his death in 1886. He was also director of the Liceo Musicale in Genoa from 1874 to 1886. He died in Genoa on March 31, 1886.

Rossi composed four operas in the style of Giuseppe Verdi: Elena di Taranto (1852), Giovanni Giscala (1855), Nicolò de’ Lapi (1864) and Cuore di madre (1871). He also sacred music, including the oratorio Le sette parole and three masses.
