= Adalgisa Gabbi =

Italian operatic soprano (1857–1933)

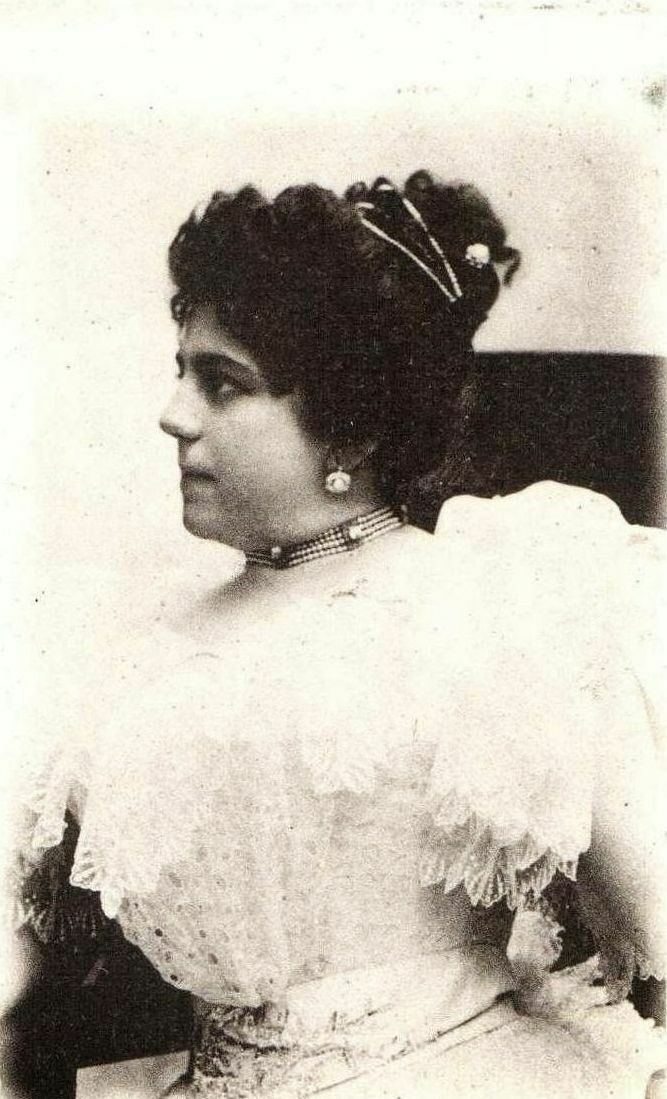
- Born: 23 May 1857; Parma, Italy
- Died: 16 December 1933 (aged 76); Milan, Italy
- Occupation: Operatic soprano

Adalgisa Gabbi (23 May 1857 – 16 December 1933) was an Italian operatic soprano. After her 1875 debut in Lecco as Maria in Filippo Marchetti's Ruy Blas, she first made a name abroad, performing in Poland, Latin America, and London. It was not until the late 1880s that she established herself in Italy, performing in Turin, Naples, and in Milan, where she appeared in December 1889 at La Scala as Eva in the Italian premiere of Wagner's Die Meistersinger von Nürnberg.

== Early life ==
Born in Parma on 23 May 1857, Gabbi began to study voice in Bologna when she was 14. In October 1872, she was admitted to the Parma Conservatory, where she studied under Lodovico Spiga and Vincenzo Lombardi. In 1875, she became a pupil of Felice Varesi in Milan who arranged for her to make her debut that year in Lecco as Maria in Marchetti's Ruy Blas.

== Career ==
In 1876, after appearing in Verdi's La traviata in Cremona, Gabbi joined an Italian opera company in Poland, performing in Warsaw, Kraków, and in Lemberg, where she was so successful that she was engaged for the next two seasons. She performed the title role in Verdi's Aida and Élisabetta in his Don Carlos as well as the title role in Moniuszko's Halka. Thereafter she appeared in Nice as Cecilia in Antônio Carlos Gomes' Il Guarany (1880), in Trento as Aida, and in Palermo, before moving to Spain to perform in Valencia, Zaragoza, and Santander.

From December 1880 to April 1881, she made guest appearances in two theatres in Havana, Cuba, in the title role of Donizetti's Lucrezia Borgia, gaining wide acclaim from both the critics and audiences. On 6 December 1880, the Havana newspaper La Discusión commented on her performance, praising "her perfect intonation, the masterful projection of her voice, the exquisite color of her singing, her school, and above all her expressive feeling". Immediately afterwards she travelled to London, where she performed the leading roles in Il trovatore and Aida at Her Majesty's Theatre. She continued to appear in Aida throughout 1881 and in early 1882, for example in Rimini and in Bologna.

In 1883, she embarked on a two-year tour of Latin America appearing in Argentina, Peru, Chile, Brazil, and Bolivia in a variety of operas including La Traviata, Fromental Halévy's La Juive, Lucrezia Borgia, Verdi's Il trovatore and Bellini's Norma. She is remembered in particular for her success at the Teatro Colón in Buenos Aires and at the Don Pedro Theatre in Rio de Janeiro where she appeared in Aida, La traviata and Il Guarany. She became so popular in South America that according to the Barcelona newspaper La Vanguardia (22 October 1888), shopkeepers offered their clients beautiful little portraits of her.

After appearing in Bucharest in early 1884, she returned to Italy, appearing in Turin as Valentine in Meyerbeer's Les Huguenots. But it was from 1887 that she gained extensive recognition in Italy, in particular in April 1887 in Rome as Desdemona in Verdi's Otello, acting as a stand-in for Romilda Pantaleoni. Although Verdi was somewhat critical of her interpretation of the role, she successfully performed it in other Italian cities, including Venice, Brescia and Florence. She then spent the next two years at the Teatro di San Carlo in Naples, appearing in Don Carlos, Otello, Gounod's Faust and Meyerbeer's L'Africaine. In April 1889, she appeared in the Neopolitan premiere of Wagner's Tannhäuser and on 26 December 1889, in Milan at La Scala in the Italian premiere of Wagner's Die Meistersinger von Nürnberg. Gabbi retired from the stage after appearing in Trieste in 1900 in the title role of Wagner's Tristan und Isolde.

Adalgisa Gabbi died in Milan on 16 December 1933 at the age of 76.
