= Giuseppe Gallignani =

Italian composer (1851–1923)

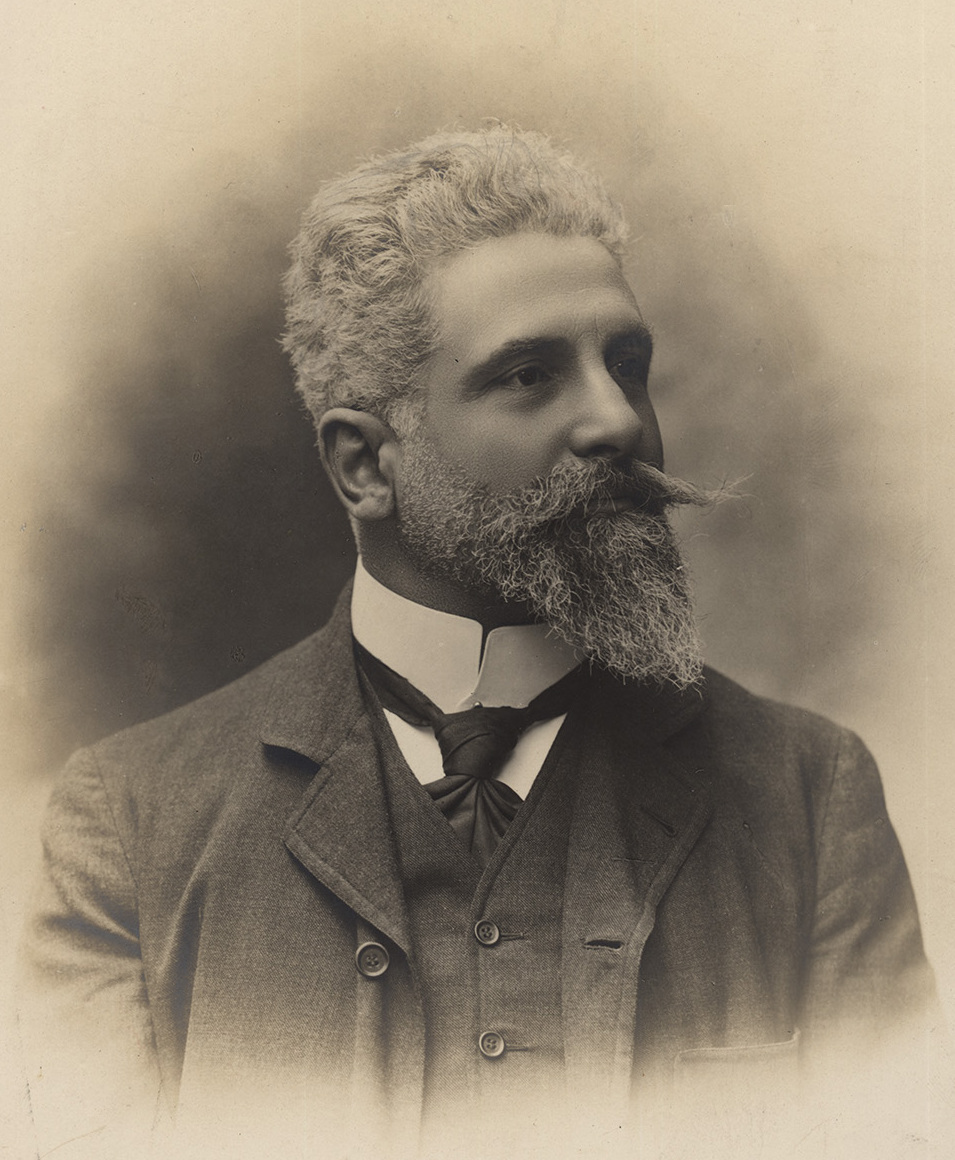
Giuseppe Gallignani

Giuseppe Gallignani (January 9, 1851, Faenza - December 14, 1923, Milan) was an Italian composer, conductor and music teacher.

He graduated from Milan Conservatory.

Author operas Il grillo del focolare (1873, one of the Christmas stories Charles Dickens - the first in the history of opera in the Dickens story), Atala (1876), Nestorius (1888) et al., as well as numerous spiritual music.

In 1884-1891 musical director of Milan Cathedral. In 1891, on the recommendation of Giuseppe Verdi and Arrigo Boito he was appointed director of the Parma Conservatory and directed it until 1897. In 1894 he held a series of concerts to commemorate the 300th anniversary of the death of Giovanni Palestrina, which provoked a violent backlash.

In 1923, refusing to join the National Fascist Party, he was accused of embezzling public money and committed suicide.
