= Amilcare Zanella =

Italian composer (1873–1949)

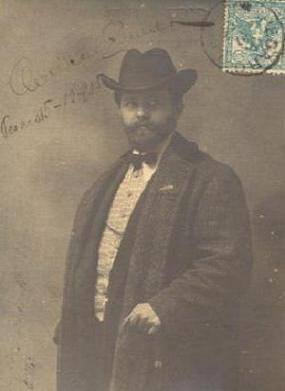
- 1905 portrait of Amilcare Zanella
- Born: 26 September 1873
- Died: 9 January 1949 (aged 75)

Amilcare Zanella (26 September 1873 – 9 January 1949) was an Italian composer.

Born in Monticelli d'Ongina, Zanella studied in Cremona under Andreotti before entering the Parma Conservatory, where he studied under Giovanni Bottesini and graduated in 1891. The following year he went to South America, where he worked as an opera conductor and a pianist; upon his return to his native land in 1901, he organized an orchestra that traveled the country giving symphonic concerts. It was with this group that he introduced some of his own music. In 1903 he became director of his alma mater, remaining in the post for two years; in 1905 he was tapped to succeed Pietro Mascagni as head of the Conservatorio Statale di Musica "Gioachino Rossini" in Pesaro. There he was to remain until 1939, when he was succeeded in the post by Riccardo Zandonai. He died in Pesaro.

Zanella's compositional output consisted mainly of orchestral and chamber works. He also composed three operas; Aura (1910, to a libretto by Ida Finzi), premiered at the Liceo Rossini; La Sulamita (1926, to a libretto by Antonio Lega), premiered at the Teatro Politeama Piacentino in Piacenza; and Il revisore (1940, after The Government Inspector of Nikolai Gogol), premiered at the Teatro Lirico Giuseppe Verdi in Trieste. During his career he was also well-regarded as a pianist.
