= Giancarlo del Monaco =

Italian opera stage director

- Born: 27 December 1943 (age 82); Venice, Kingdom of Italy
- Citizenship: Italy; Russia
- Occupation: Opera director
- Years active: 1965–present
- Children: 4
- Parents: Mario del Monaco (father); Rina Fedora Filipini (mother)
- Website: www.giancarlodelmonaco.com

Giancarlo del Monaco (born 27 December 1943), is an Italian stage director, and general manager for several opera companies and festivals.

== Early life ==
Del Monaco was born in Venice to operatic tenor, Mario Del Monaco and operatic soprano, Rina Fedora Filipini. Being born into musical family, Del Monaco was exposed to music and the operatic world from an early age.

== Career ==
In 1965, at age 22, he made his debut as a stage director in a production of Samson et Dalila in Syracuse, Sicily, which was starred by his father. In 1970 to 1973, he worked as the personal assistant to Rudolf Gamsjäger, the General Manager of Vienna State Opera. After that, he worked as an assistant to opera directors, Wieland Wagner, Günther Rennert and Walter Felsenstein until 1976 before taking the position of principal stage director in Ulm, Germany.

Del Monaco has staged more than 100 operas in his operatic repertoire, among them are La fanciulla del West, Stiffelio, Madama Butterfly, Simon Boccanegra, La forza del destino, Rigoletto, Turandot, Las Golondrinas, Il barbiere di Siviglia, Don Carlos, Norma, Pagliacci, Cavalleria rusticana, La traviata, Tosca, Otello and Abai.

He also has served as the General Manager for several opera companies and festivals: the Montepulciano Festival in 1975, Staatstheater Kassel from 1980 to 1982, the Macerata Festival from 1986 to 1988 and Theater der Bundesstadt in Bonn from 1992 to 1997. In the 1992-93 season, he made his debut as a director at the Metropolitan Opera. He served as the General Director of Opéra de Nice from 1997 to 2001, and as the Artistic Director of the Tenerife Opera Festival from 2009 to 2011.

With his career as General director, Giancarlo del Monaco was one of the most important stage directors of his generation.

He has directed opera productions in many noted opera houses and music venues in various locations, including Barcelona, Beijing, Berlin, Bologna, Bregenzer Festspiele, Buenos Aires, Catania, Hamburg, Los Angeles, Madrid, Munich, Milan, Montpellier, Naples, New York City, Chorégies d'Orange, Paris, Rome, Savonlinna, Stuttgart, Tel Aviv, Venice, Washington, Vienna and Zurich.

Del Monaco is fluent in 5 languages.

== Personal life ==
Del Monaco has four daughters: Stella, Fedora, Alessandra and Laura.

In December 2024, Vladimir Putin granted Del Monaco Russian citizenship.
