= Mario Del Monaco =

Italian opera singer (1915–1982)

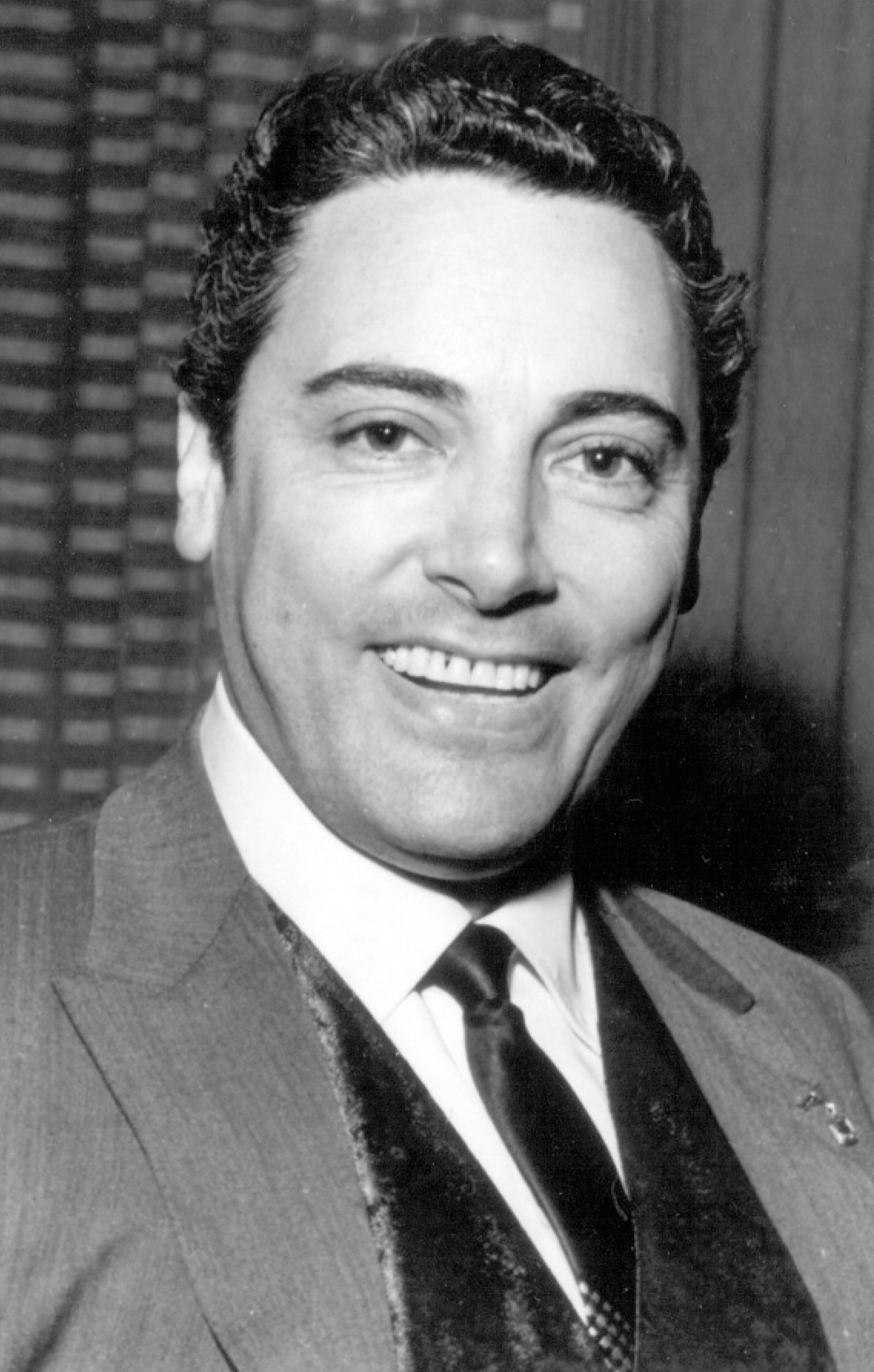
- Born: 27 July 1915; Florence, Italy
- Died: 16 October 1982 (aged 67); Mestre, Italy
- Occupation: Opera singer (tenor)
- Years active: 1940 – 1975
- Spouse: Rina Fedora Filipini
- Children: 2, including Giancarlo del Monaco

Mario Del Monaco (27 July 1915 – 16 October 1982) was an Italian operatic tenor.

== Biography ==
A young Mario Del Monaco (photo with 1949 dedication)

Del Monaco was born in Florence, into a musical upper-class family, to a Neapolitan father and to a mother of Sicilian descent. As a young boy he studied the violin but had a passion for singing. He graduated from the Rossini Conservatory at Pesaro, where he first met and sang with Renata Tebaldi, with whom he would form something of an operatic dream team of the 1950s. His early mentors as a singer included Arturo Melocchi, his teacher at Pesaro, and Cherubino Raffaelli, who recognized his talent and helped launch his career.

That career began in earnest with Del Monaco's debut on 31 December 1940 as Pinkerton at the Puccini Theater in Milan. (His initial appearance in an opera had occurred the previous year, however, in Mascagni's Cavalleria rusticana in Pesaro.) He sang in Italy during the Second World War and married, in 1941, Rina Filipini. In 1946, he appeared at London's Royal Opera House, Covent Garden, for the first time. During the ensuing years he became famous not only in London but also across the operatic world for his powerful voice and heroic acting style. It was almost heldentenor-like in scope but Del Monaco was no Wagnerian, confining his activities overwhelmingly to the Italian repertoire. Only twice did he sing Wagner in public, performing Lohengrin at La Scala in Italian in 1957, and Siegmund in the original German version of Die Walküre in Stuttgart in 1966.

Del Monaco sang at the New York Metropolitan Opera from 1951 to 1959, enjoying particular success in dramatic Verdi parts such as Radamès. He soon established himself as one of four Italian tenor superstars who reached the peak of their fame in the 1950s and '60s, the others being Giuseppe Di Stefano, Carlo Bergonzi and Franco Corelli. Del Monaco's trademark roles during this period were Giordano's Andrea Chénier and Verdi's Otello.

He first tackled Otello in 1950 and kept refining his interpretation throughout his career. It is said that he sang Otello 427 times. However, the book published by Elisabetta Romagnolo, Mario Del Monaco, Monumentum aere perennius, Azzali 2002, lists only 218 appearances by him as Otello, which is a more realistic figure. Although Otello was his best role, throughout his career, Del Monaco sang a number of other roles with great acclaim, for example: Canio in Pagliacci (Leoncavallo), Radames in Aida (Verdi), Don Jose in Carmen (Bizet), Chenier in Andrea Chénier (Giordano), Manrico in Il trovatore (Verdi), Samson in Samson and Delilah (Saint-Saëns), and Don Alvaro in La forza del destino (Verdi).

Del Monaco sang at La Scala with Maria Callas in 1955 (Andrea Chénier, Norma) and starred with Callas in "Norma" at the Met in 1956, amongst other Callas pairings.

Del Monaco made his first recordings in Milan in 1948 for His Master's Voice. Later, he was partnered by Renata Tebaldi in a long series of Verdi and Puccini operas recorded for Decca. On the same label was his 1969 recording of Giordano's Fedora, opposite Magda Olivero and Tito Gobbi.

His ringing voice and virile appearance earned him the nickname of the "Brass Bull of Milan".

The soprano Magda Olivero noted in an interview with Stefan Zucker that:

When Del Monaco and I sang Francesca da Rimini together at La Scala [in 1959] he explained his whole vocal technique to me. When he finished I said, "My dear Del Monaco, if I had to put into practice all the things you’ve told me, I’d stop singing right away and just disappear." The technique was so complicated: you push the larynx down, then you push this up, then you do that—in short, it made my head spin just to hear everything he did.

In 1975 he retired from the stage. He died in Mestre as a result of nephritis. He was buried in his Otello costume.

His son Giancarlo Del Monaco is an opera director and theatre manager; his niece Donella Del Monaco, a soprano, is the singer of Opus Avantra.

== Discography ==
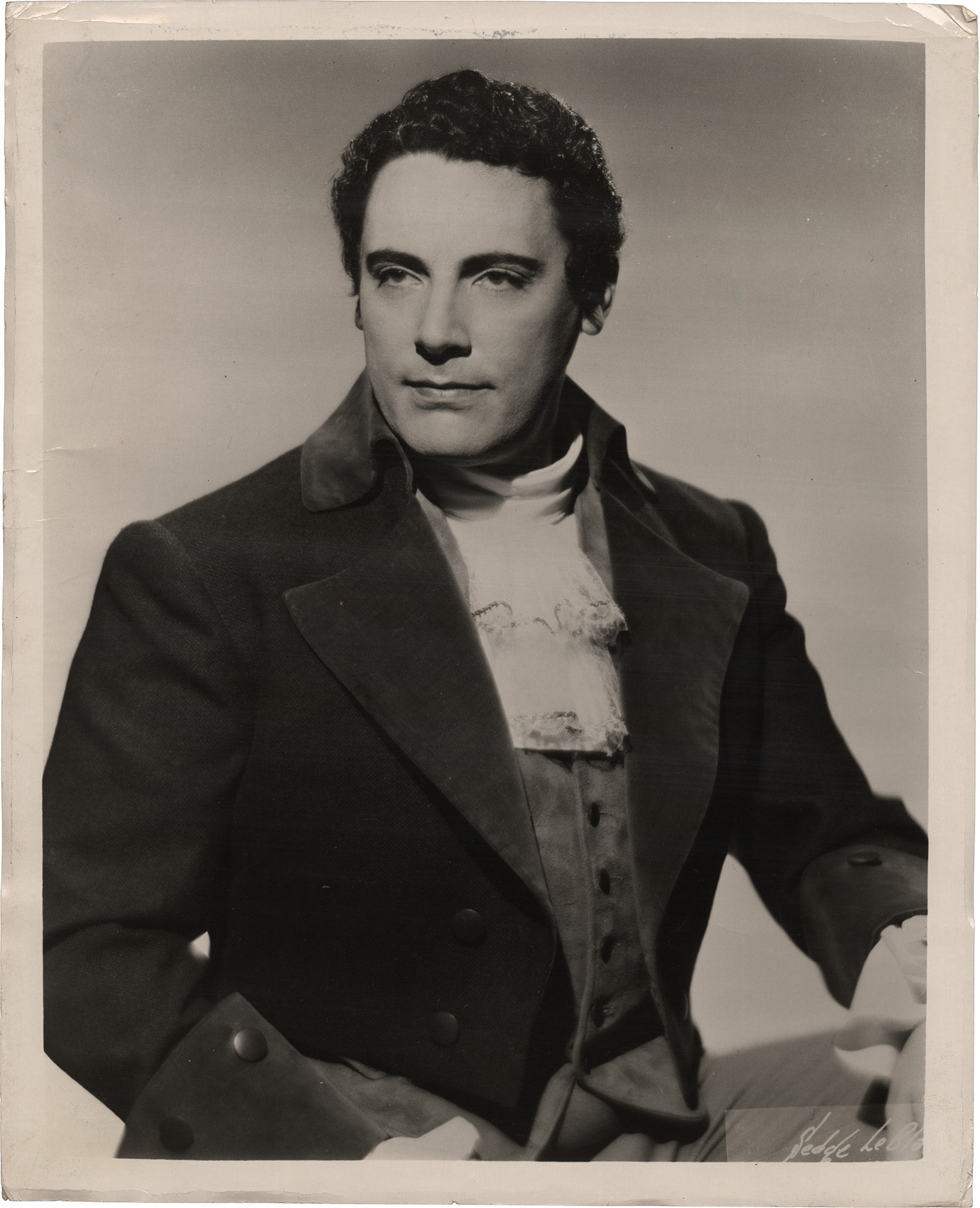
Del Monaco by Sedge Le Blang, before 1982.

=== Studio recordings for Decca ===
All stereo unless otherwise indicated.

[Composer – Opera (year of recording) – other singers – conductor.]

- Bellini – Norma (1967) – Souliotis, Cossotto, Cava – Varviso.
- Bizet – Carmen (1963) – Resnik, Sutherland, Krause – Schippers.
- Boito – Mefistofele (1959) – Tebaldi, Siepi – Serafin.
- Catalani – La Wally (1968) – Tebaldi, Cappuccilli, Diaz – Cleva.
- Cilea – Adriana Lecouvreur (1961) – Tebaldi, Simionato, Fioravanti – Capuana.
- Giordano – Andrea Chenier (1957) – Tebaldi, Bastianini – Gavazzeni.
- Giordano – Fedora (1969) – Olivero, Gobbi – Gardelli.
- Leoncavallo – Pagliacci (1953, mono) – Petrella, Poli, Protti – Erede.
- Leoncavallo – Pagliacci (1959) – Tucci, MacNeil, Capecchi – Molinari-Pradelli.
- Mascagni – Cavalleria Rusticana (1953, mono) – Nicolai, Protti – Ghione.
- Mascagni – Cavalleria Rusticana (1960) – Simionato, MacNeil, Satre – Serafin.
- Mascagni – Cavalleria Rusticana (1966) – Souliotis, Gobbi – Varviso.
- Ponchielli – La Gioconda (1957/8) – Cerquetti, Simionato, Bastianini, Siepi – Gavazzeni.
- Puccini – Il Tabarro (1962) – Tebaldi, Merrill – Gardelli.
- Puccini – La fanciulla del West (1958) – Tebaldi, MacNeil, Tozzi – Capuana.
- Puccini – Tosca (1959) – Tebaldi, London – Molinari-Pradelli.
- Puccini – Turandot (1955) – Borkh, Tebaldi – Erede.
- Puccini – Manon Lescaut (1954) – Tebaldi, Corena – Molinari-Pradelli.
- Verdi – Aida (1952, mono) – Tebaldi, Stignani, Protti – Erede.
- Verdi – Il Trovatore (1956) – Tebaldi, Simionato, Savarese – Erede.
- Verdi – La Forza del Destino (1955) – Tebaldi, Bastianini, Siepi, Simionato, Corena – Molinari-Pradelli.
- Verdi – Otello (1954) – Tebaldi, Protti – Erede.
- Verdi – Otello (1961) – Tebaldi, Protti – Karajan.
- Verdi – Requiem Mass (1965) – Crespin, Rhodes, Pagliuca – Ansermet.
- Verdi – Rigoletto (1954, mono) – Gueden, Simionato, Protti, Siepi – Erede.

=== Live ===
[Composer – Opera (year and place of the performance) – other singers – conductor – label(s).]

- Bellini – Norma (1955, Rome) – Callas, Stignani, Modesti
- Bellini – Norma (1955, Milan) – Callas, Simionato, Zaccaria
- Berlioz – I troiani (1960, La Scala) Simionato, Cossotto, Kubelik – Walhall
- Bizet – Carmen (1957, New York) Stevens – Mitropoulos
- Bizet – Carmen (1959, Moscow) – Archipova, Lisitsian – Melik-Pashayev – Myto
- Catalani – La Wally (1953, Milan) – Tebaldi, Guelfi – Giulini-UMPG
- Giordano – Andrea Chenier (1955, Milan) – Callas, Protti, Amadini – Votto – Opera d'Oro
- Giordano – Andrea Chenier (1961, Tokyo) – Tebaldi, Protti – Capuana – Opera d'Oro
- Giordano – Fedora (1965, Napoli) – Olivero – Molinari-Pradelli
- Leoncavallo – Pagliacci (1959, Moscow) – L. Maslennikova, Ivanov – Nebolsin – Myto
- Leoncavallo – Pagliacci (1959, New York) – Amara, Warren, Sereni – Mitropoulos – Walhall
- Leoncavallo – Pagliacci (1961, Tokyo) – Tucci, Protti – Morelli – Gala.
- Leoncavallo – Pagliacci (1962, San Francisco) – Horne, Bastianini – De Fabritiis – Melodrama
- Mascagni – Cavalleria Rusticana (1961, Tokyo) – Simionato – Morelli – Gala
- Puccini – Turandot "excepts" (1949, Buenos Aires) Callas – Serafin. BMI
- Puccini – Manon Lescaut (1951, Mexico) Petrella – Antonicelli
- Puccini – Madame Butterfly (1951, Mexico) González – Antonicelli
- Puccini – Tosca (1954, Napoles) – Caniglia, Guelfi – Rapalo – Opera Depot
- Puccini – La Fanciulla del West (1954, Firenze) – Steber, Guelfi – Mitropoulos – Walhall
- Puccini – La Fanciulla del West (1957, La Scala) – Frazzoni, Gobbi – Votto
- S.Saens – Samson et Dalila (1958, New York) Stevens – Cleva. Myto
- S.Saens – Samson et Dalila (1959, Napoli) Madeira, Clabassi – Molinari-Pradelli
- Verdi – Aida (1951, Mexico) Callas, Taddei, Dominguez – De Fabritiis – Warner Classics
- Verdi – Aida (1952, New York) Milanov, Warren, Rankin – Cleva – Myto
- Verdi – Aida (1961 Tokyo) – Tucci, Simionato – Franco Capuana – Gala 100.507
- Verdi – Ernani (1956, New York) – Milanov, Warren, Siepi – Mitropoulos – Andromeda, Myto
- Verdi – Ernani (1957, Florence) – Cerquetti, Bastianini, Christoff – Mitropoulos – Opera d'Oro
- Verdi – Ernani (1960, Naples) – Roberti, Bastianini, Rossi-Lemeni – Previtali – Andromeda
- Verdi – La Forza del Destino (1953, Florence) – Tebaldi, Protti, Siepi, Barbieri, Capecchi – Mitropoulos – Accademia, Foyer
- Verdi – La Forza del Destino (1953, New Orleans) Milanov, Warren – Herbert
- Verdi – Otello (1950, Buenos Aires) – Rigal, Guichandut – Votto – Myto
- Verdi – Otello (1951, México) Taddei, Petrella – De Fabritiis
- Verdi – Otello (1954, Milan) Tebaldi, Warren – Votto. Myto
- Verdi – Otello (1955, New York) – Warren, Tebaldi – Stiedry – Walhall
- Verdi – Otello (1958, New York) – Warren, De los Angeles – Cleva – Myto
- Verdi – Otello (1959, Tokyo) – Gobbi, Tucci – Erede – Opera d'Oro
- Verdi – Otello (1962, London) – Gobbi, Kabaivanska – Solti. Naxos
- Verdi – Otello (1962, Dallas) Ligabue, Vinay – Rescigno
- Verdi – Otello (1966, Montreal) Tebaldi, Gobbi – Erede
- Verdi – Otello (1969, Naples) Suliotis, Colzani – Molinari-Pradelli
- Verdi – Otello (1972, Brusells) Ricciarelli, Protti – Ferraris
- Wagner– Die Walküre (1966, Stuttgart) Silja, C. Alexander – Leitner-Opera depot
- Zandonai – Francesca da Rimini (1959, Milan) Olivero, Malaspina- Gavazzeni. Myto

=== Compilation albums ===
- Mario del Monaco: Decca Recitals 1952–1969 – 5 CDs, all studio – opera arias, sacred music, Neapolitan, Spanish and English songs.
- Mario del Monaco: Grandi Voci – DECCA, 19 tracks, all studio – excellent selection of his finest arias (mostly Verdi and Puccini, but also including 'Vesti la giubba') plus three popular songs (including 'Granada').
- The Singers: Mario del Monaco – DECCA, 17 tracks – mostly opera arias (Puccini, Wagner, Bellini, Verdi) plus a few popular/sacred pieces.
- Mario del Monaco: Opera Arias – Testament, 23 tracks – collection of early mono recordings.
- Mario del Monaco: Granada: Canzoni e Serenate – Replay, 14 tracks – fine compilation of popular Italian canzonettas plus 'Granada'.
- Mario del Monaco: Historical Recordings 1950–1960 – Gala, 23 tracks – live recordings; extremely poor presentation with no dates or locations given.
- Mario Del Monaco: Live – IDIS, 8 tracks – all live recordings, 1951–57; mostly arias from Verdi (Ernani, Il Trovatore, La Forza del Destino, Aida) plus Pollione's aria from Bellini's Norma.

== Videography ==
Video recordings released on DVD; Live performances unless otherwise stated.

[Composer – Opera (year and place of the performance) – other singers – conductor – label.]

- Mascagni – Cavalleria Rusticana (1952, New York, film) – G. Bamboschek
- Giordano – Andrea Chénier (1955, Milan, film) – Stella, Taddei – A. Questa – RAI Milano – Bel Canto Society (no subtitles!)
- Giordano – Andrea Chénier (1961, Tokyo) – Tebaldi, Protti – Capuana – Vai
- Leoncavallo – Pagliacci (1961, Tokyo) – Tucci, Protti – Morelli – Vai
- Verdi – Aida (1961, Tokyo) – Tucci, Simionato, Protti – Capuana – Vai
- Verdi – Il trovatore (1957, Milano, film) – Gencer, Bastianini, Barbieri – Previtali – Hardy Classics
- Verdi – Otello (Rome, 1958, film) – Capecchi, Carteri – Serafin – Hardy Classics
- Verdi – Otello (Tokyo, 1959) – Gobbi, Tucci – Erede – Vai
- Mario del Monaco at the Bolshoi – Carmen, Pagliacci (excerpts; Moscow, 1959) – Maslennicova, Arkhipova, Lisitsian – Tieskovini, Melik-Pashaev – Vai (Del Monaco sang in Italian, the Russian casts in Russian.)
