= Mario Giulio Fara =

Italian musicologist (1880–1949)

Mario Giulio Fara (1880–1949) was an Italian musicologist and historian of music. He was the director of the Pesaro conservatory of music. In 1913–14 he published important studies on the folk music of Sardinia.
