= Paolo Castaldi =

Italian essayist and composer (1930–2021)

- Born: 9 September 1930; Milan, Kingdom of Italy
- Died: 22 February 2021 (aged 90); Milan, Italy
- Occupations: Essayist; Composer

Paolo Castaldi (9 September 1930 – 22 February 2021) was an Italian essayist and composer.

== Biography ==
Castaldi attended the school of music at the Milan Conservatory, where he studied under Antonino Votto and Carlo Maria Giulini. He also studied engineering at the Polytechnic University of Milan. He also studied at the Accademia Musicale Chigiana and the Darmstädter Ferienkurse, where he attended lectures by Karlheinz Stockhausen, Pierre Boulez, and Mauricio Kagel.

Castaldi's works were frequently broadcast on radio and played in public. He simultaneously taught at conservatories in Milan and Parma. His primary publishers were Casa Ricordi and Suvini Zerboni. His style often adopted artificial and grotesque mechanisms, as he used landscapes, buildings, and castles in the scenography of his notes. Musicologist Renzo Cresti wrote that "despite having attended the Ferienkurse he has always placed himself outside the constructivist tendency, indeed, he laughs at it; he takes materials taken from works of the past and subjects them to an ironic collage which de-subjectivizes the work; through the cyclical fixity of the iterations of these materials, the original meaning is emptied. Lead composer, Castaldi plays iconoclastic games that reject the concept of novelty, the sound elements are objects that are recycled, between nostalgia for the past and the desire to make a scandal."

Castaldi died in Milan on 22 February 2021 at the age of 90.

== Works ==
- 3 Immagini (1948)
- Per i miei amici (1949)
- Preludio e toccata (1950)
- Trio (1950–1951)
- Il teatrino delle marionette (1952)
- Sonatina (1952)
- 5 Liriche greche (1953)
- Suite classica (1953)
- 3 Canoni (1954)
- Contrappunti-Concerto da camera (1954)
- Sonata pro pace (1954–1955)
- 3 concerti (1953–1955)
- Divertimento (1958–1959)
- 3 Studi (1959)
- Frase (1960)
- Clausola (1961)
- Monotone (1961–1968)
- Tendre (1962)
- Facsimile (1962)
- Anfrage (1963)
- Diktat (1963)
- Moll (1964)
- Esecuzione di Moll (1964–1977)
- Elisa (1964–1967)
- Schoenberg A-B-C (1967)
- Concerto (1967)
- Tema per uno che non parla (1968)
- Clausola (1968)
- L'Oro (1968)
- Allegretto (1968–1978)
- Tema (1968)
- Grid (1969)
- Doktor Faust (1969)
- 153 (1969)
- Sigla (1969)
- Invenzione (1969)
- Definizione di "Grid" (1969)
- Filarmonica (1969–1970)
- K. 522 (1970)
- Scale (1970)
- Left (1971)
- Studio (1971)
- Notturno (1971)
- Finale (1971–1973)
- Romanza (1971–1974)
- Esercizio (1971)
- Caro Babbo (1972)
- L'Esercizio con pf. (1973)
- Cardini (1973)
- Innere Stimme (1974)
- Es (1975)
- Moderato (1975)
- Altra Romanza (1975–1976)
- Ultima Romanza (1976)
- Sunday Morning (1975)
- Simile A (1978)
- Goethe (1975–1976)
- Simile (1976)
- Simile B (1978)
- Simile C (1978)
- Idem (1978)
- Battente; Cadenze; Isola; Interludio; Eco; Anonimo; Isola (1976–1978)
- Cedendo (1978)
- Clap (1980)
- Allegretto (1981)
- Simile D (1982)
