= Parma Conservatory =

Italian music conservatory (established in 1819)

Coordinates: 44°47′59″N 10°19′29″E

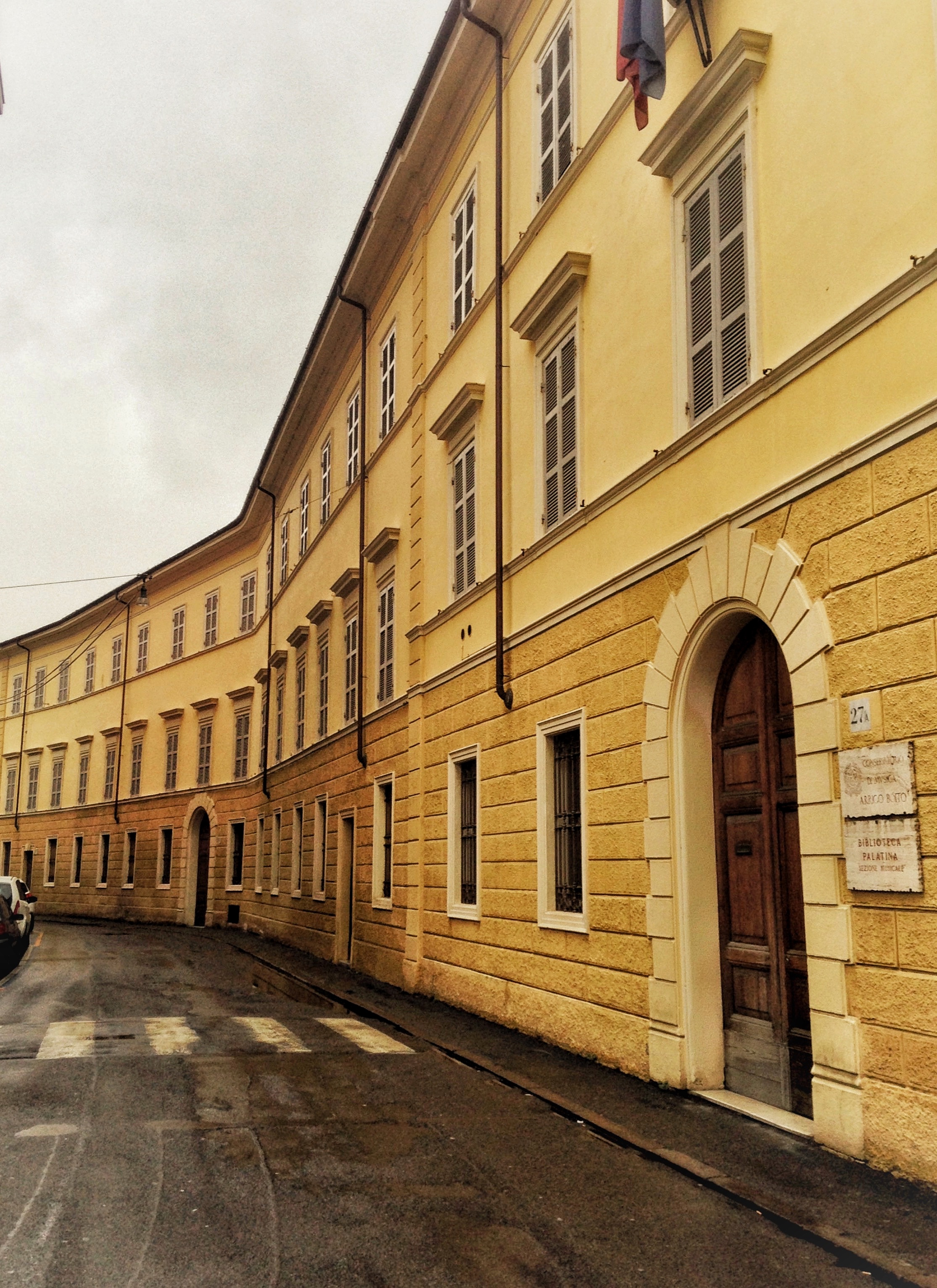
Parma Conservatory

The Conservatorio di Musica Arrigo Boito, better known in English as the Parma Conservatory, is a music conservatory in Parma, Italy. It was originally established as the Regia Scuola di Canto, a school for singing in 1819 by Marie Louise, Duchess of Parma, and expanded into a conservatory of music in 1825. In 1840 instrumental music instruction began, followed by the addition of music composition, conducting, and other musical studies.

Initially a school open only to men, the Parma Conservatory became a co-education institution in 1855 known as the Regia Scuola di Musica. In 1888 the school moved from being a private school to a public institution operated by the Government of Italy. Its name was changed to its present title to honor the composer Arrigo Boito in 1919.

== History ==
The first school of music in the city of Parma was the Regia Scuola di Canto; a school founded in 1769 with the purpose of training vocalists attached to the Teatro Ducale opera house. It was housed at the Chiesa di Santa Maria del Carmine. The school was operated by Francesco Z. Poncini, the organist of the Sanctuary of Santa Maria della Steccata, until it closed in 1792.

The city was without a music school until the Parma Conservatory was established with the financial backing and political will of Marie Louise, Duchess of Parma, the wife of Napoleon; also under the name Regia Scuola di Canto. The school was originally housed at the Chiesa di San Ludovico and was initially established as another school for singing in 1819 with the purpose of providing trained choristers to sing at the Teatro Ducale and the Chiesa di San Ludovico. In 1825 the school was expanded into a conservatory, but did not provide instruction in instrumental music until 1840. Later additional studies in composition, conducting, and other music topics were added and by 1859 the full offering of the canon of studies in music was established.

The Parma Conservatory was originally only open to men. A separate school of music for women was established in the city in 1833, and in 1855 that school merged with the Parma Conservatory to create a co-education institution known as the Regia Scuola di Musica. Composer and conductor Giovanni Rossi was director of the conservatory from 1864 through 1874. In 1888 the Parma Conservatory became a public institution operated by the Government of Italy; joining the three other state run music conservatories at that time: the Milan Conservatory, the Naples Conservatory and the Palermo Conservatory.

The composer Arrigo Boito succeeded Giovanni Bottesini as director of the Parma Conservatory in 1889; serving in that post until 1897. The conservatory's name was changed to the Conservatorio di Musica Arrigo Boito in honor of the composer in 1919.

The conservatory has housed the Premio Mario Zanfi, an international piano competition also known in English as the Franz Liszt Competition, since 1981.

== Notable alumni ==
- Mariella Adani, soprano
- Bruno Barilli, composer and actor
- Gaetano Bavagnoli, conductor
- Nazario Carlo Bellandi, organist, pianist, harpsichordist, and composer
- Carlo Bergonzi, tenor
- Giovanni Bolzoni, composer and violinist
- Cleofonte Campanini, conductor and violinist
- Italo Campanini, tenor
- Ettore Campogalliani, composer
- Ailem Carvajal Gómez, composer
- Michael Chapman, bassoonist
- Serena Daolio, soprano
- Daniela Dessì, soprano
- Jolanda di Maria Petris, soprano
- Aldo Ferraresi, violinist
- Vito Frazzi, composer
- Giorgia Fumanti, soprano
- Adalgisa Gabbi, soprano
- Franco Ghione, conductor and violinist
- Fiorello Giraud, tenor
- Luigi Infantino, tenor
- Agide Jacchia, conductor
- Gorni Kramer, accordionist , double bass player, and bandleader
- Luigi Lunari, writer
- Leone Magiera, pianist and conductor
- Gianfranco Masini, conductor
- Virgilio Mortari, composer
- Carlo Negrini, tenor
- Anastasiya Petryshak, violinist
- Ildebrando Pizzetti, composer
- Enrico Polo, violinist and composer
- Elvina Ramella, soprano
- Marina Rebeka, soprano
- Gino Redi, composer
- Sesto Rocchi, violin maker
- Luca Salsi, baritone
- Luciano Sgrizzi, harpsichordist, organist, pianist and composer
- Renata Tebaldi, soprano
- Camillo Togni, composer
- Arturo Toscanini, conductor
- Rino Vernizzi, bassoonist
- Vittoria Yeo, soprano
- Maria Zamboni, soprano
- Amilcare Zanella, composer, conductor and pianist
- Michele Zocca, record producer and composer

== Notable faculty ==
- Marcello Abbado, pianist and composer
- Arrigo Boito, composer and librettist
- Giovanni Bottesini, double bass player, conductor and composer
- Italo Brancucci, composer and voice teacher
- Attilio Brugnoli, composer, pianist and musicologist
- Ettore Campogalliani, composer
- Paolo Castaldi, composer and writer on music
- Giuliano Ciannella, tenor
- Franco Fabbri, musicologist
- Luca Fanfoni, violinist
- Guido Alberto Fano, composer, pianist, and conductor
- Alceo Galliera, conductor and composer
- Giuseppe Gallignani, composer and conductor
- Giorgio Federico Ghedini, composer
- Carlo Jachino, composer
- Achille Longo, composer
- Gian Francesco Malipiero, composer and musicologist
- Roberto Molinelli
- Federico Mompellio (also alumnus), musicologist, music editor, music librarian, and music critic
- Enzo Muccetti, bassoonist
- Pietro Scarpini, pianist, harpsichordist, composer and conductor
- Rito Selvaggi, composer, pianist, conductor, and poet
- Gaetano Sgarabotto, luthier
- Giovanni Tebaldini, scholar, composer and conductor
- Paolo Ugoletti, composer
