= Giovanni Antiga =

Italian organist and composer

Giovanni Antiga (July 29, 1878 – July 11, 1960), also known as Jean Antiga, was an Italian organist and composer. He was born in Miane and he died in Nice.

== Career ==
Born into a family with many children, he was entrusted to the care of his uncle, Leopoldo Antiga. He began to learn music under the tutelage of Ferdinando Battel, the organist at San Michele di Ramera. Battel encouraged him to study at an conservatory. He graduated from conservancies in Pesaro and Milan under the direction of, among other teachers, Antonio Bazzini and Erminia Foltran Carpenè. After graduating, he moved to the French town of Grasse. From 1902 to 1910, he was the director of the cathedral. He held the titles of Professor of Education and Grand Officer of the national academy of Paris.

He married cellist Jenny Motti; they had two daughters, Mireille and Andreina. He and Motti often performed together. He made an annual visit to Miane to perform at the church's organ. The Paris-based Delrieu publishing house has reissued many of his works for piano. One of his compositions has been included in the National Piano Competition in France.

== Notable works ==
- Impressioni al Carmine (piccola suite)
- Campane a festa
- Presso una fontanella
- Ninna Nanna
- Raggi di luna sul mare
- Campane di Roma
- Contemplando un Crocifisso del Brustolon a S. Fior
- Canto d'Amore
- Piccola raccolta di impressioni giovanili
- Riduzioni di composizioni classiche per le piccole mani
- Sulla tomba di un eroe
- La visione del Cadore
- Le foglie d'autunno
- Il canto del montanaro
- La canzone nostalgica
- Il tramonto del sole
- Trot des cavaliers
- Boite a musique
- Le fontane di camurei
- Je t'amerai toujours
- Dance roustique
- Il Piave (poema sinfonico)
- Sulle rive del Piave
- Polonaise
- Suonata per piano e violino
- Tarantella napoletana
- Ricordi di Spagna
- Cinque pezzetti romantici
- Exercices du meccanisme et de velocité
