= Duo Alterno =

Italian chamber ensemble

- Origin: Turin, Italy
- Genres: Contemporary classical
- Occupation: Chamber ensemble
- Years active: 1997-present
- Members: Founder; Tiziana Scandaletti and Riccardo Piacentini

The Duo Alterno is an Italian voice-piano chamber ensemble specializing in 20th century and contemporary classical music. The Duo made up of soprano Tiziana Scandaletti and composer-pianist Riccardo Piacentini. It was founded in Turin, Italy.

Duo Alterno's made its debut in February 1997 at the Vancouver Italian Contemporary Music Festival, where it held concerts and masterclasses for the University of British Columbia, the Simon Fraser University and the Vancouver Academy of Music. Since then they have performed in the major Italian festivals and in more than forty countries, including Europe, North America, South America, Asia and Australia, through concerts, masterclasses and CDs.

== CDs ==
- 1999 - Giacomo Manzoni. Du Dunkelheit (Milan, Curci E. 11326 C.)
- 1999 - Musiche dell'aurora (Turin, Italian Foundation of Photography - Rive-Gauche Concerti RG 00005)
- 1999 - Shahar (Milan, Curci E. 11351 C.)
- 2000 - Giorgio Federico Ghedini. Sacred Music (Turin, Nuova Era CD 7354)
- 2001 - Arie condizionate (Turin, Italian Foundation of Photography - Rive-Gauche Concerti RG 00009)
- 2001 - Giorgio Federico Ghedini. Canti e strambotti (Turin, Nuova Era CD 7365)
- 2002 - Alfredo Casella. Liriche (Turin, Nuova Era CD 7371)
- 2003 - Treni persi (Province of Turin - Rive-Gauche Concerti RG 00012)
- 2004 - Franco Alfano. Liriche da Tagore (Turin, Nuova Era CD 7388)
- 2004 - Mina miniera mia (Province of Turin - Rive-Gauche Concerti RG 00014)
- 2004 - Musiche della Reggia di Venaria Reale (Piedmont Region - Rive-Gauche Concerti RG 00015)
- 2005 - La voce contemporanea in Italia - vol. 1 (Milan, Stradivarius STR 33708)
- 2006 - La voce contemporanea in Italia - vol. 2 (Milan, Stradivarius STR 33743)
- 2007 - La voce contemporanea in Italia - vol. 3 (Milan, Stradivarius STR 33769)
- 2007 - Italienischer Gesangsabend mit dem Duo Alterno (Graz, Steirischer Tonkünstler Bund STB 07/07)
- 2009 - La voce contemporanea in Italia - vol. 4 (Milan, Stradivarius STR 33833)
- 2010 - La voce crepuscolare - Notturni e Serenate del '900 (Milan, Stradivarius STR 33839)
- 2011 - La voce contemporanea in Italia - vol. 5 (Milan, Stradivarius STR 33895)
- 2013 - La voce contemporanea in Italia - vol. 6 (Milan, Stradivarius STR 33976)

== Tours abroad Italy ==
- Argentina (1998, 2004)
- Australia (2004, 2008, 2010)
- Austria (2009, 2015)
- Azerbaijan (2014, 2015)
- Belgium (2002, 2005)
- Brazil (2012, 2016)
- Canada (1997, 2003, 2008, 2009, 2013, 2014)
- China (2002, 2007, 2008, 2010, 2015)
- Chorea (2001)
- Croatia (2015)
- Czech Republic (2009, 2010, 2012, 2013)
- Denmark (1999, 2008, 2016)
- Ethiopia (2010)
- Finland (1998, 1999, 2010, 2015)
- France (2001, 2010, 2015)
- Germany (2007, 2008, 2009, 2012, 2013, 2016)
- Guatemala (2016)
- Netherlands (2005, 2014)
- Hong Kong (2011, 2015)
- Hungary (2010, 2014)
- Japan (2006, 2007)
- Kazakhstan (2001)
- India (2004)
- Indonesia (2001, 2004, 2015)
- Latvia (2009)
- Lithuania (2009)
- Macedonia (2003)
- Malta (2011)
- Mongolia (2007, 2010)
- Norway (1999, 2002)
- Peru (2012)
- Russia (2005, 2009, 2014)
- Singapore (2001, 2002, 2003, 2010, 2015)
- Sweden (1999, 2008, 2015)
- United Kingdom (2001)
- United States (2000, 2003, 2005, 2006, 2007, 2008, 2009, 2010, 2012, 2013, 2014)
- Turkey (2005, 2016)
- Ukraine (2009)
- Uzbekistan (1998, 1999)
- Venezuela (2012, 2016)

== Repertoire ==
- Marcello Abbado
- Franco Alfano
- Davide Anzaghi
- Victor Andrini
- Marino Baratello
- Andrea Basevi
- Giorgio Battistelli
- Umberto Bombardelli
- Cathy Berberian
- Luciano Berio
- Sonia Bo
- Giovanni Bonato
- Mauro Bortolotti
- Aldo Brizzi
- Gilberto Bosco
- Valentino Bucchi
- Sylvano Bussotti
- Curt Cacioppo
- Beatrice Campodonico
- Mauro Cardi
- Alfredo Casella
- Pieralberto Cattaneo
- Mario Cesa
- Ernest Chausson
- Fabio Cifariello Ciardi
- Giovanni Cima
- Aldo Clementi
- Alberto Colla
- Giorgio Colombo Taccani
- Azio Corghi
- Luigi Dallapiccola
- James Dashow
- Fabrizio De Rossi Re
- Leonid Desyatnikov
- Franco Donatoni
- Gaetano Donizetti
- Luigi Esposito
- Lorenzo Ferrero
- Boris Filanovski
- David Froom
- Sandro Fuga
- Stanislao Gastaldon
- Ada Gentile
- Giorgio Federico Ghedini
- Riccardo Giavina
- Giuseppe Giuliano
- Domenico Guaccero
- Giovanni Guaccero
- Adriano Guarnieri
- Richard Hermann
- Carlo Alessandro Landini
- Martin Q. Larsson
- Corrinne Lateur
- Luca Leone
- Antonello Lerda
- Paola Livorsi
- Luca Lombardi
- Bruno Maderna
- Gian Francesco Malipiero
- Giacomo Manzoni
- Giuseppe Martucci
- Marco Molteni
- Ennio Morricone
- Carlo Mosso
- Luigi Nono
- Franco Oppo
- Marcello Panni
- Goffredo Petrassi
- Riccardo Piacentini
- Carlo Pinelli
- Piera Pistono
- Biagio Putignano
- Maurice Ravel
- Lodovico Rocca
- Gioachino Rossini
- Aurelio Samorì
- Giacinto Scelsi
- Arnold Schönberg
- Salvatore Sciarrino
- Christopher Shultis
- Leone Sinigaglia
- Antonio Smareglia
- Alessandro Solbiati
- Daniela Terranova
- Francesco Paolo Tosti
- Fabio Vacchi
- Giuseppe Verdi
- Dmitri Yanov-Yanovsky
- Vittorio Zago

(Composers who have dedicated works to the Duo Alterno are in italics)
