= Quirino Principe =

Italian musicologist (born 1935)

Quirino Principe (born 19 November 1935 in Gorizia) is an Italian philosopher of music, poet, dramatist, Germanist, translator, actor.

== Teaching activity ==
Principe holds a degree in Philosophy from the University of Padua.
He taught on the musicology courses of the "G. Verdi" Conservatory of Milan.
Further teaching engagements have included those at the University of Trieste (lecturer in history of modern and contemporary music), at Roma Tre "Ostiense" University (lecturer in philosophy of music) and at Verona Accademia per l'Opera Italiana (where he has taught librettology, history of theatre, dramaturgy, and stylistics of poetry since 2007).

== Works ==
Considered by music critic Paolo Isotta as "the greatest living expert on Mahler", Principe wrote two extensive monographs on Gustav Mahler and Richard Strauss which are regarded as "fundamental" by Enciclopedia Treccani:

- Mahler, Rusconi 1983, 2nd edition Bompiani 2002, 3rd edition Bompiani 2011
- Strauss, Rusconi 1989, 2nd edition Bompiani 2004

Other books he authored in the fields of musicology, literary analysis, and music pedagogy are:

- Vita e morte della scuola, Rusconi 1970
- I potenti della letteratura, Rusconi 1971
- La rivelazione incompiuta, 1974
- Il rombo del motore, Vallecchi 1974
- Manuale di idee per la scuola, Rusconi 1977 [Sibari Prize 1978]
- La “Sonnambula” di Vincenzo Bellini, Mursia 1991
- I quartetti per archi di Beethoven, Anabasi – Società del Quartetto di Milano 1993
- La musica a Milano nel Novecento, UTET 1996
- Gianandrea Gavazzeni alla Scala, Teatro alla Scala 2001
- Il teatro d’opera tedesco 1830-1918, L’Epos 2004
- Musica, Electa-Mondadori 2010
- Wagner e noi: "Lohengrin" Jaca Book 2012
- L’umano atterrito dal soprannaturale: "Tannhäuser" Jaca Book 2013.

Many poems of his have been published in monographic collections, such as

- Il libro dei Cinque Sentieri [Sebeto Prize 1974], Scheiwiller-All’Insegna del Pesce d’Oro, 1973.
- Other poetic cycles have been published in "Poesia e spiritualità" (year II, no. 4, Passagem Sem Guarda Edizioni, Madeira 2010).

In addition there are some theatrical works by Principe, such as:

- Turbativa (1992)
- La saracena (1998)
- ... poudre d'Ophélia (2002)
- text for the Pantomime K446 by W. A. Mozart (2007)
- Speculum mundi (2008).

Various poems of Principe's have been set to music by composers such as Bruno Bettinelli, Sonia Bo, Massimo Di Gesu.

== Translations ==
Principe has translated many works from German (including books by Ernst Jünger and the complete Cantatas by Johann Sebastian Bach).
Principe has been an advocate of writer J. R. R. Tolkien: he contributed to Italian knowledge of The Lord of the Rings by editing the Italian translation of the book from its second edition (1970) onwards.

He has contributed since 1992 to the Sunday cultural supplement of Il Sole 24 Ore.

== Honours ==
In 1996 the President of the Austrian Republic awarded Principe the 1st Class Cross of Honour for Science and Art.
In 2006 he was elected a member of the Accademia Nazionale di Santa Cecilia in Rome.
In 2009 the President of the Italian Republic bestowed on him the title of Knight of the Order of Merit of the Italian Republic.
