= Riccardo Frizza =

Italian conductor (born 1971)

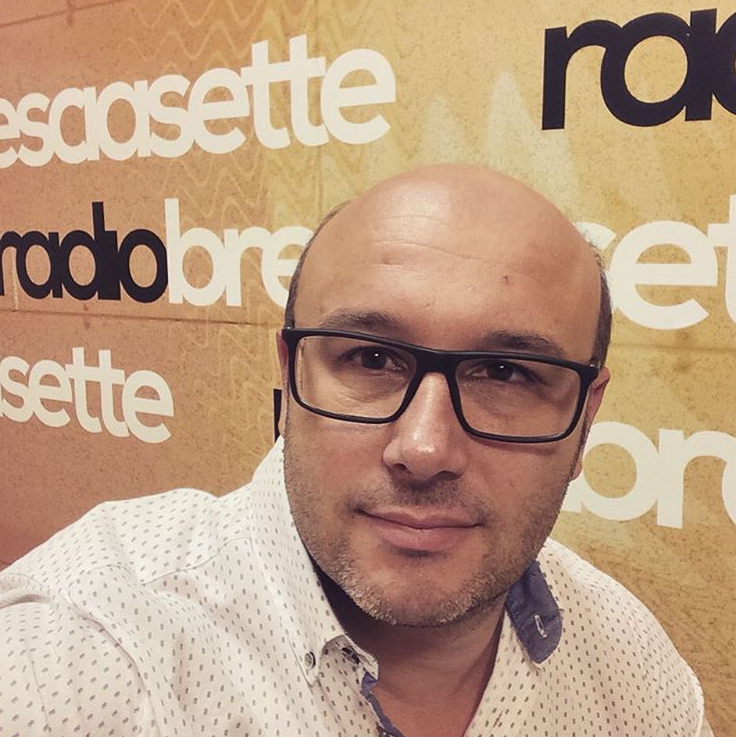
- Born: 14 December 1971 (age 54); Brescia, Italy
- Education: Milan Conservatory
- Occupation: Conductor
- Years active: 1994–present

Riccardo Frizza (born 14 December 1971) is an Italian conductor, particularly known for his work in the Italian operatic repertoire. After making his professional conducting debut in 2001 with Rossini's Stabat Mater at the Rossini Opera Festival in Pesaro, he went on to conduct in the leading opera houses of Europe and the United States, including La Scala, La Fenice. the Paris Opera, and New York's Metropolitan Opera.

== Life and career ==
Frizza was born in Brescia, Italy, where he began his musical studies. He then studied under Elisabetta Brusa at the Milan Conservatory and with the conductors Gilberto Serembe at the Music Academy of Pescara and Gianluigi Gelmetti at the Accademia Chigiana in Siena. From 1994 until 2000, he was the principal conductor of his local orchestra (Orchestra Sinfonica di Brescia) before making his official conducting debut with Rossini's Stabat Mater in 2001 at the Rossini Opera Festival in Pesaro. He subsequently returned to the festival to conduct Il Turco in Italia in 2002, Matilde di Shabran in 2004, and Adelaide di Borgogna in 2006. In 2006 he also made his US conducting debut with L'italiana in Algeri at Washington National Opera. In the ensuing years he made several major house debuts, including the Metropolitan Opera conducting Rigoletto (2009), the Paris Opera conducting La Cenerentola (2012), La Scala conducting Verdi's rarely performed Oberto (2013), the Arena di Verona conducting Rigoletto (2013), La Fenice conducting La traviata (2015) and Gran Teatre del Liceu conducting L'Italiana in Algeri (2018).

Frizza is married to the Spanish soprano Davinia Rodríguez whom he met while conducting L'elisir d'amore at the Festival de Opera de Las Palmas in 2005. The couple have one daughter.

== Recordings ==
- Martinů: Mirandolina – Belarus National Philharmonic Orchestra, Riccardo Frizza (conductor). CD, Supraphon, 2004
- Verdi: Nabucco – Orchestra and chorus of Teatro Carlo Felice, Riccardo Frizza (conductor). DVD, Dynamic, 2005
- Donizetti: La Fille du régiment – Orchestra and chorus of Teatro Carlo Felice, Riccardo Frizza (conductor). DVD, Decca, 2006
- Rossini: Matilde di Shabran – Orquesta Sinfonica de Galicia, Riccardo Frizza (conductor). CD, Decca, 2006
- Rossini: Armida – Orchestra and Chorus of the Metropolitan Opera, Riccardo Frizza (conductor). DVD, Decca, 2010
- Donizetti: Lucrezia Borgia – Orchestra and Chorus of San Francisco Opera, Riccardo Frizza (conductor). DVD, Euroarts, 2013,
- Mozart: Don Giovanni – Orchestra and Chorus of Teatro La Fenice, Riccardo Frizza (conductor). DVD, C Major/Unitel Classica, 2014.
- Donizetti: The Three Queens - Lyric Opera of Chicago, Sondra Radvanovsky, Riccardo Frizza (conductor). PENTATONE, 2022
- Rachmaninoff, Respighi, Martucci: Italian Perspectives, Bamberg Symphony, Riccardo Frizza (conductor). PENTATONE, 2026
