= Michelangeli =

Michelangeli is an Italian surname. Notable people with the surname include:

- Arturo Benedetti Michelangeli (1920–1995), Italian classical pianist
- Marcella Michelangeli (born 1943), Italian actress
- Umberto Benedetti Michelangeli (born 1952), Italian conductor
