= Serembe =

Serembe is a surname. Notable people with the surname include:

- Gilberto Serembe (born 1955), Italian conductor and professor
- Giuseppe Serembe (1844–1901), Arbëresh writer
