= Cavallone =

Cavallone may refer to:

- Alberto Cavallone (1938–1997), Italian film director and screenwriter
- Paolo Cavallone (born 1975), Italian composer, pianist, and poet
- Grotta del Cavallone, a cave in Italy
