= Carlo Alessandro Landini =

Italian composer

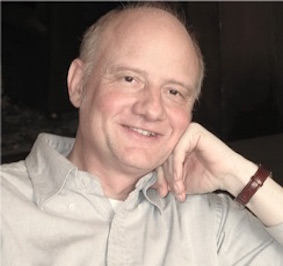
- Born: Carlo Alessandro Landini; April 20, 1954 (age 72); Milan, Italy
- Education: Conservatorio "Giuseppe Verdi", Milan; University of Milan; CNSM de Paris; University of California, San Diego
- Occupations: Composer, scholar, essayist
- Years active: 1970s–present
- Awards: Valentino Bucchi Prize (1986); Ernest Bloch Competition (1994); K. Serocki Competition (2002, 2004); Witold Lutosławski Competition (2007); Athens International Composition Prize (2010); Francesco Siciliani Prize (2016)

Carlo Alessandro Landini (born April 20, 1954) is an Italian composer, scholar, and essayist. Educated in Italy, France, and the United States, he has been active in contemporary classical music since the late 1970s. His work encompasses large-scale instrumental and chamber compositions and reflects sustained engagement with post-war European compositional traditions.

Landini has taught at Italian and international conservatories and universities, including the Conservatory of Piacenza and Columbia University, and has held visiting professorships in Europe and the United States.

His music has been performed at major contemporary music festivals and venues, including the Darmstadt Summer Courses, the Venice Biennale, and the Solomon R. Guggenheim Museum in New York. Landini has received several international composition awards, including the Valentino Bucchi Prize, the Ernest Bloch Competition, and the Witold Lutosławski International Composers Competition.

== Early life and education ==
Carlo Alessandro Landini began his musical studies in the piano and composition classes of the Milan Conservatorio "Giuseppe Verdi", under the guidance of Piero Rattalino and Bruno Bettinelli respectively, graduating in 1978 and 1979. His interests extended beyond music, leading him to graduate in 1982 in Modern Literature, with a dissertation dedicated to the Capuchin nun Saint Veronica Giuliani. The work was later revised and published as an expanded essay.

Between 1975 and 1978, Landini attended specialization courses held by Franco Donatoni at the Accademia Chigiana in Siena. From 1978 to 1986, he participated in the Darmstadt Summer Courses, studying with leading figures of French spectral music, including Gérard Grisey, Tristan Murail, and Hugues Dufourt.

He later attended courses with Iannis Xenakis, György Ligeti (Aix-en-Provence), and Witold Lutoslawski in Grožnjan. In 1979, Landini moved to Paris, where he studied with Olivier Messiaen and, after admission to the CNSM, attended the classes of Ivo Malec and Claude Ballif, graduating with a Premier Prix. In 1981, he moved to the United States on a Fulbright Fellowship and studied and taught at the University of California, San Diego, earning a master’s degree in 1983.

== Academic career ==
From 1983, Landini taught at the Conservatory of Piacenza as a tenured professor, retiring in 2021. In 2003, he was appointed at Columbia University in New York, where he collaborated with Jonathan Kramer and attended Fred Lerdahl’s seminars, focusing on models of musical tension and relaxation in pitch space.

A Fellow of the Italian Academy at Columbia University, Landini has served as Visiting Professor at the University of Maryland, Baltimore (2006), the Musikhochschule in Trossingen (2010), and the Academy of Performing Arts in Prague (2012).

== Works and performances ==
Landini’s works have been performed at major contemporary music festivals and institutions, including the Darmstadt Summer Courses, the Accademia Chigiana in Siena, the Venice Biennale, the World New Music Days (Vienna–Bratislava), the Prokofiev Festival in St. Petersburg, Salle Gaveau in Paris, the Guggenheim Museum in New York, the Pomeriggi Musicali in Milan, the Roy O. Disney Concert Hall in Los Angeles, the Livewire Festival in Baltimore, the JD Robb Composers’ Symposium in Albuquerque, the Autunno Musicale Campano in Caserta, and the Filharmonia Śląska Season in Katowice. His works are published by Pizzicato, Sonzogno, Alphonse Leduc, Curci, and Carisch.

== Awards and recognition ==
Landini has received numerous international awards for his compositions, including the Valentino Bucchi Prize (Rome, 1986), the Ernest Bloch Competition (Lugano, 1994), the K. Serocki Competition (Warsaw, 2002 and 2004), the Athens International Composition Prize (2010), and the Witold Lutosławski International Composers Competition (Warsaw, 2007), becoming the first Italian recipient. In 2016, he won the "Francesco Siciliani" Competition in Perugia with his Kyrie for nine mixed voices.

== Music ==
Landini’s compositions are notable for their extended durations and large-scale formal structures. His Sonata No. 1 for piano (1981) lasts over an hour, while his Piano Sonata No. 2 (1987) extends to approximately ninety minutes. His string quartet Changes consists of a single uninterrupted movement of about forty minutes and was premiered by the Arditti Quartet at Darmstadt in 1994.

His Sonata No. 5 for piano is among his most extensive works, lasting up to seven hours in its complete version, while a shorter version lasts approximately two and a half hours. The score consists of 650 pages and has been described as a work inviting prolonged listening and reflection.

Musicologist Quirino Principe has described Landini’s music as a "search for beautiful sound", while Renzo Cresti situates his work within a cultural sphere linked to Middle European and classical traditions.
