= Massimo Di Gesu =

Italian composer

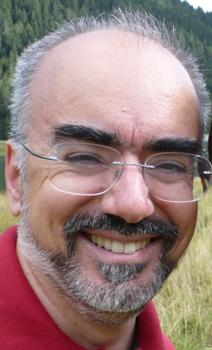
Massimo Di Gesu (2010)

Massimo Di Gesu is an Italian composer, born in 1970.
His artistic work also encompasses poetry, with his musical and poetic practices connected by his stated “principle of necessity”.

== Academic studies ==
At the Milan Conservatory Di Gesu attained the Diploma in Piano in 1992, and the Diploma in Composition in 1995. He studied composition with Bruno Bettinelli, and piano with Jole Mantegazza and Anita Porrini, one of Cortot's and Benedetti Michelangeli's pupils. Besides further piano studies with Valerio Premuroso, he attended post-graduate composition courses at the Petrassi Academy (Parma), at the University of Central England (Birmingham), and at the University of Leeds.

== Style ==
«At first, his musical thought could be traced back to the expressionism of Schönberg and the mastery of Berg.
Actually, what is here perceptible is the mighty shadow of J. S. Bach»
(Flavio Emilio Scogna on Gradus ad responsum for piano).

Di Gesu's approach to composition (alien to fashionable currents, and based on a distinctly atonal harmonic idiom) focuses on the symbols hidden in the syntax of sounds.

His compositional technique enables the construction of melodic, harmonic, and contrapuntal structures forming a narrative arc of such discursive power that Quirino Principe described his music as "strong... indeed, among the strongest" (review of the world premiere of Verdigo for string quartet at La Scala Theatre - Sole 24 Ore).

Di Gesu's language is characterised by the search for a perceptible force of attraction (what he refers to as the "principle of necessity") linking the elements of the musical narrative as natural entities are interconnected: an interconnection-related force of attraction that confirms that esthetic is what "est-ethic".
This principle of necessity is considered an indispensable condition for the narrative's vitality, and hence its significance; in fact, it is intrinsic to both his musical and poetic research.

== Partnerships and collaborations ==
Di Gesu's debut at La Scala Theatre took place in May 2013, when La Scala String Quartet premiered his Verdigo, a work which the ensemble had commissioned on the occasion of the bicentennial of Giuseppe Verdi's birth. La Scala String Quartet had already played Di Gesu's works such as Ansikte mot ansikte (for Serate Musicali - Milano, and Ente Concerti Pesaro) and WOLFiliGrANG (at the Rovereto Mozart Festival).

In 2014 the Teatro La Fenice (Venice) commissioned from him Luci d'estate which was premiered by the Ex Novo Ensemble in July of the same year.

Other artistic partners of Di Gesu's are

- Peter Bradley-Fulgoni, who has performed works of his in venues like St Martin-in-the-Fields - London, Salle Cortot - Paris, Skrjabin Museum, Richter Memorial Apartment – Moscow; besides, he has included various works of his in his CDs "PianOLYPHONY" and "PianOLYPTYCHS".
- Wiener Virtuosen (musicians of the Wiener Philharmoniker)
- Ensemble Strumentale Scaligero (musicians of La Scala Philharmonic Orchestra)
- Maurizio Simeoli
- Mariangela Vacatello (Carnegie Hall - New York)
- Duo Favalessa-Semeraro (Società Filarmonica di Trento, Circolo Filologico of Milan)
- Maurizio Zanini (Rovereto Mozart Festival)
- Trio Dansi (Università Bocconi - Milan)
- Arcturus (Leeds Art Gallery)
- I Virtuosi Italiani (Church of San Pietro in Monastero - Verona, University of Nottingham, Newbury Spring Festival).

== Poetry ==
The principle of necessity imbues Di Gesu's musical research as well as his poetic one.
Three poems from his collection "Lapillaria" (Affioramento, Al giardino, and La vita è un sogno), together with 25 Dicembre, were published in the Journal of Italian Translation (Vol. XXI, No. 1, Spring 2026, pp. 74–79.), edited by Luigi Bonaffini, Professor Emeritus at Brooklyn College, City University of New York.

The aforementioned La vita è un sogno and Al giardino, have been recited by Maria Brivio and Federika Brivio within the radio broadcast, "Diamo l’Abbrivio". In the same radio programme, Federika Brivio has also recited Incontro.

His poetic miniature Fuoco sacro was published by Alberto Casiraghy's Edizioni Pulcinoelefante in October 2026.

== Further activities ==
His reflection on the aesthetics of composition is also at the core of his writings on music, including:
Tchaikovskij: la verità di una maschera (The Truth of a Mask, 1993);
La “piccola forma” nell’età romantica (The “Small Form” in the Romantic Era, 1994);
Debussy: impressionismo e/o simbolismo? (Debussy: Impressionism and/or Symbolism?, 1994);
I 90 anni di Bruno Bettinelli (Bruno Bettinelli at 90, 2003).

Computer-based drawings of his appear on the cover of the CD “PianOLYPHONY” recorded by Peter Bradley-Fulgoni (Foxglove Audio - FOX091), and in the score of Geometria di un diletto (edition db).

== Partial list of works ==
- iridHESSEnza (2024) for flute and guitar
- A view from the pier (2020) for string orchestra
- Lilith (2020) for piano
- Rima petrosa (2019) for piano
- Das Eisemeer (2018) for piano
- Fulgida (2018) for piano
- Dionisiaco (2016) for piano
- Verdigo (2013) for string quartet
- Im Tempo eines Walzers (2012) for wind quintet and string quintet
- Aristocanto (2012) for voice and piano
- Geometria di un diletto (2011) for flute, clarinet, cello
- Omaggio a Novaro (2011) for flute and piano
- Sonata in 'F.' (2009) for cello and piano
- Music stamps (2006) for piano
- Through a glass... (2001) for piano
- Schegge (2001) for violin, cello, piano
- Trilogia dell'assenza (1999-2000) for piano
- Ansikte mot ansikte (1995-2000) for string quartet
