= Vito Palumbo =

Italian composer (born 1972)

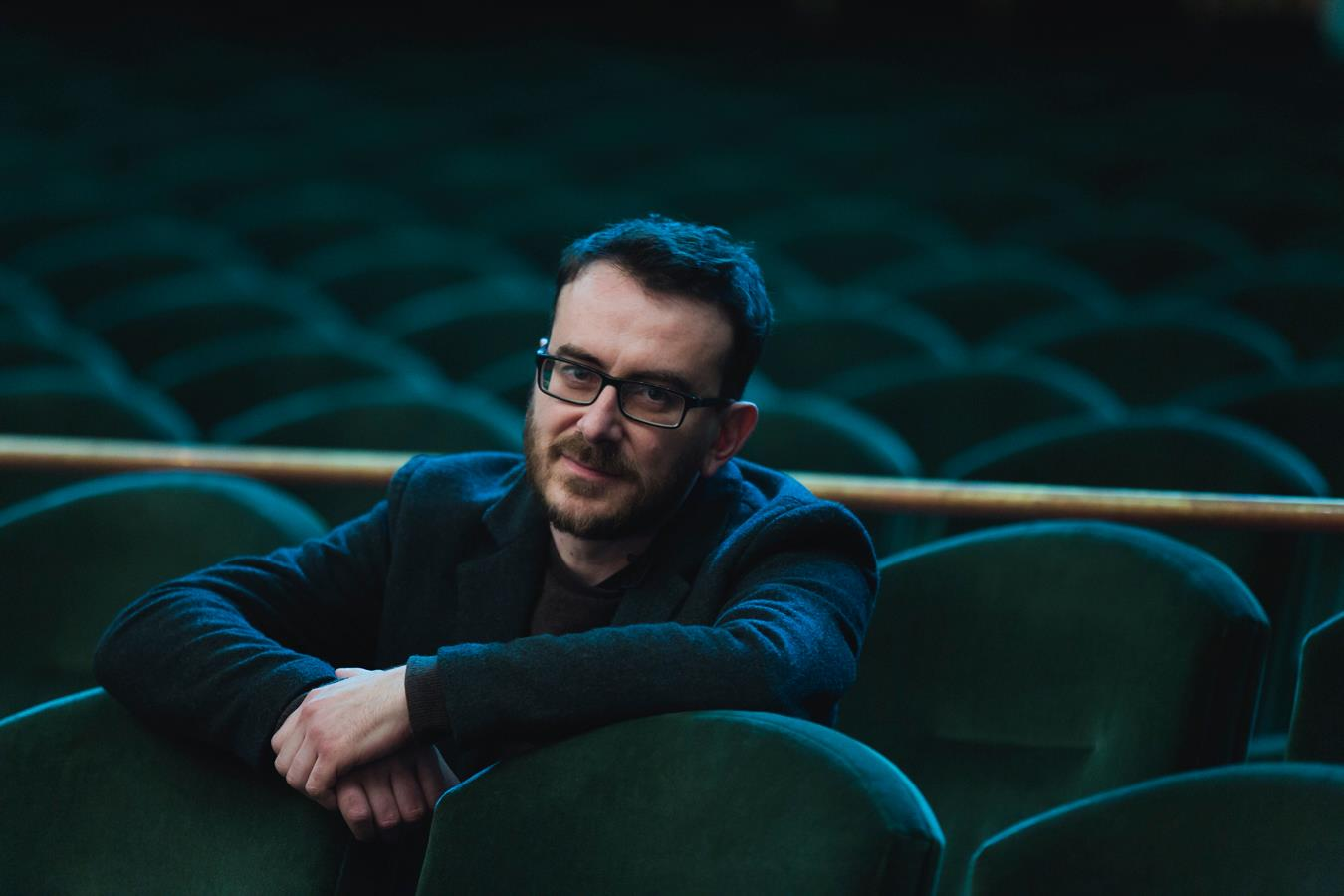
Vito Palumbo

Vito Palumbo (born 1972) is an Italian composer. He has had pieces performed by the London Symphony Orchestra, the Gävle Symphony Orchestra, the Athenäum-Quartett Berliner Philharmoniker and the RAI National Symphony Orchestra.

== Biography ==
Having been writing music from an early age, Palumbo was awarded a place at the prestigious Accademia Chigiana in Siena to study composition. Following this, he undertook a postgraduate degree at the Accademia Nazionale di Santa Cecilia in Rome, studying with the acclaimed composer Azio Corghi and graduating with Honours. Palumbo also attained a special scholarship, which was awarded personally by Luciano Berio.

In 2005, he was awarded the G. Petrassi prize (established by the President of the Italian Republic in the Quirinale, Rome) for his work in composition.

A winner of several national and international composition contests, including the Prokofiev Competition, Palumbo has received commissions worldwide from institutions and ensembles such as: the Philharmonia Quartett Berlin, Academie de France, 'Parco della Musica', the Contemporary Music Festival Parade in Beijing, the Accademia Chigiana in Siena, the 'M. Botin' Foundation, Santander, Foundation Enescu, 'Future 99', Crest, Montpellier International Festival, Barockmuseum Salzburg, the Minnesota 2010 Marimba Festival and Conference, the RAI Symphony Orchestra, Teatro Petruzzelli, Neo Norrbotten with the soloist Anna Paradiso Laurin, and so on.

In addition to the above, Palumbo has notably completed two commissions from the Athenäum-Quartett of the Berliner Philharmoniker. His works have been broadcast by several major broadcasters, including RAI Radiotre, Channel V Music RAI, Rai Tre, Arté France, Sky Classical, Radio France and Radio Wien.

He has published several CD's with the Rai Trade label, which including his works: Recitarsonando, Quadro sinfonico Concertante for piano and orchestra, Italian news, Sur le tombeau of Hayden, Schumannesque, and Ulysses amongst others. A CD with Cello Concerto, Concerto Barocco for harpsichord and strings and Recorder Concerto is published by BIS Records.

== Works ==
=== Orchestral works ===
Orchestral with soloist

- Memory Blues, for violin and orchestra (dur.12' ca.), RAI Trade Edition (2002).
- Quadro sinfonico concertante, for piano and orchestra, (dur. 27' ca.), RAI Trade Edition (2001)
- Accordion Concerto, for accordion, strings and percussions, (23' ca.), RAI Trade Edition (2011)
- Recorder Concerto, for recorder "Eagle" and Large Orchestra (30' ca.), (2013).
- Cello Concerto, (40'), (2008).
- Guitar Concerto, (40'), (2013)
- Violin Concerto, (32'), (2015)

Orchestral

- Foglie di Luna, for Large Orchestra (20' ca.), RAI Trade Edition (2003).
- Symphony n. 1, for marimba, guitar and Large Orchestra (55'), Digressione Music Edition (2013).

=== Chamber orchestra ===
- Contra, for chamber orchestra (dur. 17' ca.), RAI Trade Edition (2000).
- Rosa Canina, for chamber orchestra (15' ca.), RAI Trade Edition (2004).
- Concerto Barocco, for harpsichord and string orchestra (15' ca.), RAI Trade Edition (2005).
- Concerto Classico, for harpsichord and string orchestra (16' ca.), RAI Trade Edition (2006).
- Il Catalogo, for actress-singer, strings and percussions (15'), RAI Trade Edition (2008)

=== Chamber music ===
- Sestetto, for ensemble (12' ca.), RAI trade Edition (1999).
- Quattro Bagattelle, for soprano and ensemble (dur. 6' ca..), (2000).
- Quintetto, for flute, clarinet, violin, cello and piano (dur. 10' ca.), Suvini Zerboni Edition (2001)
- La machine des sons – pièce de théâtre, for singer-actress, clarinet, violin, cello and percussions (dur. 9' ca.), RAI trade Edition (2001).
- Deviazione classica nel meriggiare pallido..., for string quartet (dur. 24' ca.), Rai trade Edition (2001).
- Cinque di cuori, for actress-singer, flute (piccolo), cello and percussion (dur 10' ca.), RAI Trade Edition (2002).
- Divertimento, for clarinet, alto sax, harp, piano, accordion, violin e cello (dur. 7' ca.), RAI Trade Edition (2003).
- Butterfly, for actress-singer and piano (dur. 14' ca.), RAI Trade Edition (2003).
- varieAzioni, for trumpet and ensemble (13' ca.), RAI Trade Edition (2003).
- Quartetto n.2, for string quartet (20' ca.), RAI Trade Edition (2004).
- Timeline, for ensemble (12' ca.), Rai RAI Trade (2004).
- Il canto in vene d'ambra, for mezzo-soprano and ensemble (15' ca.), RAI Trade Edition (2004).
- Follia in Re, for baritone and ensemble (12' ca.), RAI Trade Edition (2005).
- Bicinium, for marimba and chitarra (11'), RAI Trade Edition (2009).
- Shakuntala, for ensemble (13' ca.), RAI Trade Edition (2002).
- Octavion, for piccolo and piano (15' ca.), RAI Trade Edition (2010).
- Songs I libro sul ciclo completo da J. Joyce, for voice and piano (45'), Digressione music Edition (2013).
- Trio, for flauto, sax and pianoforte (8'), RAI Trade (2013).
- Nostos, for harpsichord, flute and string quartet (12'), Digressione Music Edition (2014).
- Discantus, for ensemble (8'), (2014).
- Cello sonata, for cello and piano (dur. 45'), (2014).
- Fluendo, for cello and piano (dur. 8'), (2015).
- Trio, for violin, cello and piano (12'), (2016).
- Retroscena, for two pianos (8' ca.), RAI Trade Edition (2005).
- "Katabasis" Sonata, for recorder and harpsichord (dur. 30' ca.), (2015).

=== Soloist works ===
- Ab-sense, for piano solo (dur. 10' ca.), RAI Trade Edition (2002).
- Pop-songs, for piano solo (10' ca.), RAI Trade Edition (2003).
- Hoquetus, for trombone solo (8' ca.), RAI Trade Edition (2005).
- Sonata, for guitar (10' ca.), RAI Trade Edition (2006).
- Sonata, for piano solo (13'), RAI Trade Edition (2009).
- Sonatina, for piano solo (13'), RAI Trade Edition (2009).
- Studio, for cello solo (dur. 7' ca.), RAI Trade Edition (2003).

=== Operas ===
- Sinforosa, opera melologue from "Il Barone Rampante" by I. Calvino (45' ca.), RAI Trade Edition (2006).
- Comuni-canti, opera based on the poetry by E. Dickinson, for ensemble (45'), RAI Trade Edition(2008)

=== Choral ===
- Ah, dolente partita, for mixed choir (dur. 10' ca), RAI Trade Edition (2003).

=== Electroacoustic works ===
- L'ombra del sole, for vox and electronics (dur. 15' ca.), RAI Trade Edition (2001).
- In-Canto, electroacoustic work (dur. 18' ca.), RAI Trade Edition (2001).
- Kouros & Kore, electroacoustic work (dur. 6' ca.), RAI Trade Edition (2001)
- Spira, for cello and electronics, (dur. 18' ca.), RAI Trade Edition (2001)
- Pulsar, for percussion and electronics, (dur. 10' ca.), RAI Trade Edition (1999)
