= Riccardo Piacentini =

Italian composer and pianist (born 1958)

Riccardo Piacentini (born 3 July 1958, in Moncalieri, Province of Turin) is an Italian composer and pianist, professor of Composition at the Milan Conservatory.

== Biography ==
He graduated in 1980 in Composition and Piano at Turin and Alessandria Conservatories, as well as in Literature and Music History at University of Turin with a thesis on the orchestral works of Goffredo Petrassi. He studied with Carlo Pinelli, favorite pupil of Giorgio Federico Ghedini and Franco Donatoni. He participated also in courses and workshops with Sylvano Bussotti, György Ligeti, Ennio Morricone, André Richard (at the Heinrich Strobel Center in Freiburg, where Luigi Nono worked), Karlheinz Stockhausen, and in 1988 he was among the performed composers at the Internationale Ferienkurse für Neue Musik in Darmstadt.

He is particularly active both as composer of foto-musica con foto-suoni for museums - a new musical technique for counterpointing human voice, acoustic and electronic instruments and environmental sounds -, and as pianist of the Duo Alterno. With this internationally acclaimed ensemble, founded in 1997 together with his wife soprano Tiziana Scandaletti, he has performed all over the world, keeping concerts and masterclasses on the Italian vocal contemporary repertoire (recently at the University of California, Berkeley, Stanford University, Portland State University, University of New Mexico, ArtLink Festival in Belgrade, Shenyang Conservatory, Moscow Conservatory, Nuova Consonanza Festival of Rome, etc.).

Since 1986 he is artistic director of Rive-Gauche Concerti's season, now at the Accademia Albertina in Turin. He has written many musicologic articles and didactic writings, such as Armonia tonale (Tonal Harmony, Curci, Milan, 1999) and I suoni delle cose (The sounds of things, Curci, Milano, 2011).

== Discography ==
- 1989 - Incontri di musica sacra contemporanea (AA.VV., Rusty Records CLK 317/c)
- 1991 - Het Trio (AA.VV., Happy New Ears 2 CA 911)
- 1992 - Tiziana Moneta e Gabriele Rota (AA.VV., Edipan PAN 3042)
- 1992 - Dubidubidù (AA.VV., DDT 19203)
- 1995 - Poesia e musica dell'oggi (AA.VV., Rivoalto CRR 9511)
- 1997 - La crava mangia 'l muri (AA.VV., Datum-Stradivarius DAT 80006)
- 1998 - Mal'akhim (monographic CD, Nuova Era (CD 7336)
- 1999 - Musiche dell'aurora (monographic CD, Italian Photography Foundation - Rive-Gauche Concerti RG 00005)
- 1999 - Shahar (CD monografico, Curci E. 11351 C.)
- 2000 - Musiche per Pellizza da Volpedo (AA.VV., Nuova Era CD 7351)
- 2001 - Arie condizionate (CD monografico, Fondazione Italiana per la Fotografia - Rive-Gauche Concerti RG 00009)
- 2001 - Musica d'oggi e spiritualità (CD-rom con musiche di R. P., Rive-Gauche Concerti (RG 00008)
- 2001 - Antonio Segafreddo. Percussion solos and percussion in chamber music (AA.VV., Rivoalto - Sonàr CRR 2013)
- 2003 - Treni persi (CD monografico, Provincia di Turin - Rive-Gauche Concerti RG 00012)
- 2004 - Suono Sonda 3 (AA.VV., Suono Sonda FD/0304)
- 2004 - Mina miniera mia (CD monografico, Provincia di Turin - Rive-Gauche Concerti RG 00014)
- 2004 - Musiche della Reggia di Venaria Reale (CD monografico, Regione Piemonte - Rive-Gauche Concerti RG 00015)
- 2005 - La voce contemporanea in Italia - vol. 1 (AA.VV., Stradivarius STR 33708)
- 2007 - Pantoduo - Dalla terra al cielo (AA.VV., Alessio Brocca Edizioni BA 137 CD)
- 2007 - Italienicher Gesangsabend mit dem Duo Alterno (AA.VV., Steirischer Tonkünstler Bund STB 07/07)
- 2008 - La voce contemporanea in Italia - vol. 4 (AA.VV., Stradivarius STR 33833)
- 2010 - La voce crepuscolare (AA.VV., Stradivarius STR 33839)
- 2011 - La voce contemporanea in Italia - vol. 5 (Milan, Stradivarius STR 33895)
- 2013 - La voce contemporanea in Italia - vol. 6 (Milan, Stradivarius STR 33976)

== Compositions ==
Works with electronic and/or “foto-musica”:

- GPlot per uno for bass clarinet and live-electronics (1990, electronic elaboration at the Heinrich Strobel Center of Sudwestfunk in Freiburg, first world performance Basel, 1991);
- Lyriche for voices, clarinets and concrete sounds (1991, rev. 1992, first world performance Turin, 1992);
- 7x7+7. Otto filastrocche per voce di mamma e nastro magnetico (1995, electronic elaboration at the Edison Studio in Rome, first world performance Rome, Accademia Nazionale di Santa Cecilia, Teatro Quirino, 1998);
- Il viaggio finisce qui, melologue on Eugenio Montale's texts for horn clarinet, harp and tape (1994–96, electronic elaboration at DIST Studios in Genoa, first world performance Genoa, Carlo Felice Theater, 1996);
- Mal'akhim, spiritual drama in one act and three frames for soloists, choirs, organ and tape (1996/7, elaborated at the CRIM Studios in Turin, first world performance Vancouver, Western Concert Opera, Saint Andrew Westley Church, 1997);
- Musiche dell'aurora for soprano, bass flute and audio-digital support (music for the 8th International Biennial of Photography, Turin, Bricherasio Palace, 1999);
- Shahar for bass flute with soprano and audio-digital support ad lib. (1996, rev. 1999, first world performance Turin, 1999);
- Arie condizionate for female voice, hands, trombon and foto-suoni on audio-digital support: I. Mano mobile clic, II. Aria di paragone, III. Raep on (music for the 9th International Biennial of Photography, Turin, Bricherasio Palace, 2001);
- Tips & fingers for marimba and audio-digital support (2001);
- Sine nomine for soprano, reciting voice, 13 strings and foto-suoni (2001, first world performance Milan, Palazzina Liberty, 2002);
- Midi laus, vers. for flute, A clarinet, cello and audio-digital support; or vers. for flute, B clarinet, doublebass and audio-digital support; or vers. for flute, English horn, A clarinet and audio-digital support (2000, first world performance Assisi, Festival Harmonia Mundi, 2000);
- Treni persi, cantata for travelling voice, voice that has travelled, strings, percussions and foto-suoni (music for the Train Museum of Bussoleno, part 1, 2003);
- Un petit train de plaisir for string orchestra, with reciting voice and foto-suoni and lib., from Gioachino Rossini (music for the Train Museum of Bussoleno, part 2, 2003);
- Gioco-treni for sampled foto-suoni: I. Sinfonia, II. Recitativo del ferroviere, III. Aria e danze del freno, IV. Ricercare antico con fischi e trombe, V. Cori battenti dei pendolari, VI. Sinfonia II (music for the Train Museum of Bussoleno, part 3, 2003);
- Mina miniera mia for voices and foto-suoni (music for Traversella Mines, 2004);
- Picander 2004, tragicomic action for soprano, bass-baryton, flute, baroque strings, harpsichord and foto-suoni (2004);
- Musiche della Reggia di Venaria Reale for voices, baroque ensemble and foto-suoni (music for the Royal Palace in Venaria Reale, 2004);
- XXIV for flute, violin and foto-suoni (2004, first world performance Rovigo, Kermesse dantesca, 2004);
- Jeux d'eaux et d'oiseaux for exotic foto-suoni (2004, first world performance Bellina-Cuneo, International Festival Antidogma, 2004);
- Jazz motetus VI (Cricket play) for piano and foto-suoni (2005, first world performance Saint Petersburg, 2005);
- Et amoris. Tango pour Bruno for soprano, string orchestra and foto-suoni (2005, first world performance Turin, 2005);
- Foto-suoni per le Universiadi for foto-suoni (2006, first world performance Bardonecchia, 2007);
- The Brown Cage for female voice, cello, piano and foto-suoni (2007, first world performance New York City, Modern Works, 2007);
- Jardins sur la pluie for flute, cello, piano and foto-suoni (2007, first world performance Turin Conservatory, 2008);
- An Mozart, modular piece for string quartet with or without foto-suoni with or without voice and piano (2008, first world performance Toronto, SoundaXis Festival, 2008);
- Foto-suoni delle nuove scienze for voices on tape, piano and foto-suoni (2009, first world performance Toronto, Bata Shoe Museum, 2009);
- Piano, alla corda for 4 hands piano and foto-suoni (2009, first world performance Milan, 2009);
- Romanesco for piano and foto-suoni (2009, first world performance Rome, Nuova Consonanza Festival, 2009);
- Presto Vivaldi for 4 tubular bells, piano and foto-suoni (2010, first world performance Alessandria Conservatory, 2010);
- Ulaanbaatarin doo for piano, voice of pianist and foto-suoni (2010, first world performance Ulaanbaatar, Opera Theater, 2010);
- Quattro canzóne napulitane for soprano, piano, orchestra and foto-suoni ad lib. (2010, first world performance Milan, Teatro dal Verme, 2010);
- Canson piemonteisa for soprano, piano, orchestra and foto-suoni ad lib. (2010, first world performance Milan, Teatro dal Verme, 2010);
- Rataplànplanplan for piano and animal foto-suoni (2011, first world performance Berlin, BKA Theater, 2012);
- Jazz motetus IX (Out of the blue) for one or two or three or four guitars and foto-suoni (2012, first world performance Lagonegro Festival, 2012);
- Friûl for piano and foto-suoni (2013, first world performance Udine, Amici della Musica, 2012);
- À la vie for one or two performers (one piano), videoprojections and “whispered foto-suoni”, on two paintings of Kazimir Malevic and Umberto Boccioni, texts by Rainer Maria Rilke (2014, first world performance Vancouver, Pyatt Hall, 2014);
- Foto-suoni per Paraloup (parts 1, 2, 3) for pianoforte and foto-suoni (2014–15, first world performances Turin 2014, Cuneo 2014, Riva presso Chieri 2015);
- Nove favole del Re Spiro for dancing guitarist and foto-suoni, on nine Renaissance dances and texts by the composer (2015, first world performance Grugliasco-Turin, Parco Culturale Le Serre, 2016);
- FOTO-SONGS from the sacred places of the world for foto-suoni recorded in Bangkok, Singapore, Stuttgart, Strasbourg (2014–16).

Other works:

- ... et coetera for 10 players (1985, vers. 1986, first world performance Paris, Radio France, 1986);
- Alterno for string orchestra (1986, first world performance San Daniele del Friuli, Festival of Contemporary Music, 1986);
- Sacre for soloists, choir and orchestra (1989, first world performance Rome, Incontri di Musica Sacra Contemporanea, San Marco Church, 1989);
- Keir for orchestra (1989, first world performance Anzio, International Music Festival, 1989);
- Cohesive ends (Sticky) for 14 instruments and 5 players (1989, first world performance Bologna, Accademia Filarmonica, 1989);
- L'aura for string orchestra (1991);
- For four for string quartet (1992–94, first world performance Rome, Acquario Romano, 1994);
- For de la bella bella caiba for flute, soprano in eco and string orchestra (1995, first world performance Castiglione delle Stiviere, Teatro Sociale, 1995);
- Due laude di Jacopone for soprano, violin, cello, chamber orchestra and organo (1995, first world performance Florence, Easter Festival, San Felice Church, 1995);
- Uno a cui, melologue on Pier Paolo Pasolini's texts, for reciting voice, guitar, sax and percussions (1995, first world performance Rome, Festival Nuova Consonanza, 1995);
- Laus sine voce for orchestra (1996);
- Jazz motetus III for string orchestra (1997, first world performance Jesi, Festival Contemporary Music, 1997);
- Picander's, o Il grigliabeto risonante, tragicomic action for soprano, baryton, 8 instruments and people (1999, first world performance Foggia, I Solisti dauni, Piccolo Teatro, 1999);
- Macchina per Il Quarto Stato for female voice, piccolo clarinet and string quartet (2000, first world performance Turin, Celebrations for Giuseppe Pellizza da Volpedo, 2000);
- Jazz motetus V (Piperita blues) for voice, flute, clarinet, violin, electric bass guitar, hammond organ and piano (2001, first world performance Bologna, 2001);
- Tre danze logosferiche for reciting voice, flute and harp (2002, first world performance Senigallia, Musica Nuova Festival, 2002);
- Rayna possentissima for soprano and orchestra (2001, first world performance Bologna, Teatro Comunale, 2002);
- Un petit train de plaisir for string orchestra, with reciting voice and lib., from Gioachino Rossini (2003, first world performance Milan, Palazzina Liberty, 2003);
- Jazz motetus VIII (arpège) for flute, or harpsichord, or flute and harpsichord (2009).
- Compositions for one performer without electronic: Cantico spirituale (1993) per voce di baritono; Fugitives. Tre frammenti da Baudelaire (1994) per voce di soprano; Uno, due, tre (1984) e Yantra (1989) per chitarra; Crumbling (1989, rev. 1995) per violino; Beaux gestes (1991), Madrileño (1991, rev. 1998), Due fogli (1992); Steli (1997), Venexiàn (2007) per pianoforte; Dieci spleens (1991) per clarinetto in si bemolle, A.B.E.G.G. (1992) per clarinetto basso, Aforismi della desolazione (1994) per corno di bassetto, Serenata per un fischietto (1995) per clarinetto piccolo; Petit (1991) per ottavino, Moins petit (1992) per flauto in do, Amariamori (1992) per flauto in sol, Shahar (1996, vers. per solo flauto basso); Con fuoco (1995) per violoncello; Mare (1996) per arpa; Floppy (1996) per trombone; Altri aforismi (2004) per sax baritono; ecc.
