= Elisabetta Brusa =

Italian composer

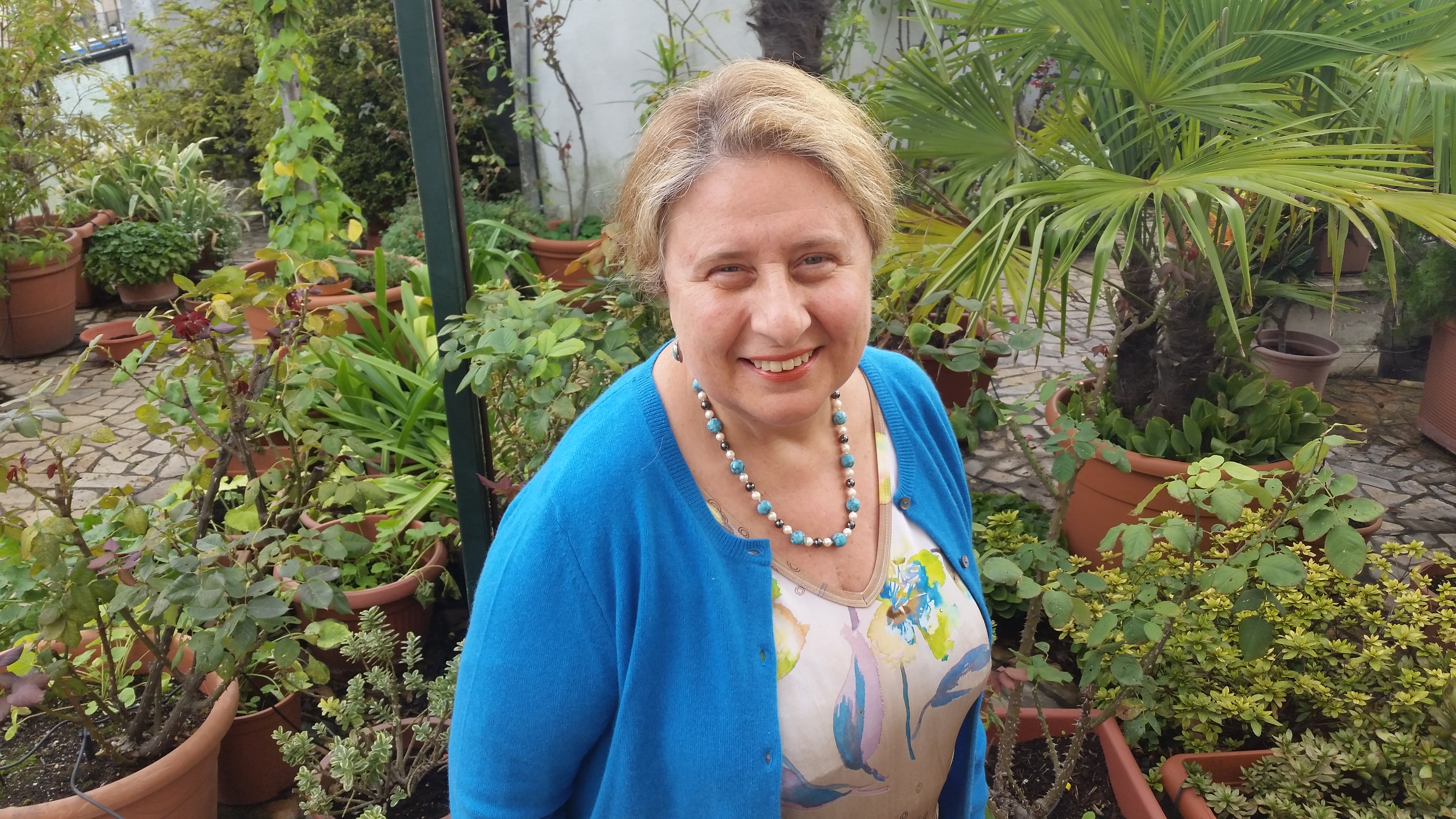

Elisabetta Olga Laura Brusa (born 3 April 1954) is an Italian/British composer.

== Biography ==
=== Early life and education ===
Elisabetta Brusa was born in Milan in 1954. She began composing pieces for piano at age five, and during her childhood wrote 32 works, including a string quartet. She graduated from the Milan Conservatory in 1980, where she studied with Bruno Bettinelli and Azio Corghi. She took summer courses in Dartington, England with Sir Peter Maxwell Davies from 1978-1985 and studied privately with Hans Keller in London.

In 1983, she appeared on the Young Italian Composers RAI 3 television program for the first time. Brusa married conductor Gilberto Serembe in 1997.

=== Career ===
Brusa won first prize at the Washington International Competition for Composition for String Quartet in 1982 with her piece Belsize. In 1983, she was awarded both a Fulbright Fellowship (allowing her to study at Tanglewood with Gunther Schuller and Hans Werner Henze) and a Fromm Music Foundation Fellowship. She was a Fellow at the MacDowell residency in the summers of 1988, 1989, and 1990; it was here she composed her first symphony.

She taught composition at a variety of institutions including music conservatories in Brescia, Vicenza, and Mantua before becoming a member of the composition and orchestration faculty at the Milan Conservatory. She held the position from 1985-2018.

Her music has been performed by the BBC Symphony Orchestra, Hungarian Radio Symphony Orchestra, Atlanta Symphony Orchestra, Ulster Orchestra, BBC Philharmonic, BBC Scottish Symphony Orchestra, RSNO Royal Scottish National Orchestra, CBC Vancouver Orchestra, State Hermitage Orchestra, St. Petersburg Symphony Orchestra, Tanglewood Music Center Orchestra, The Women's Philharmonic of San Francisco, to name just a few.

=== The Brusa Foundation Award ===
In 2024, Brusa launched a composition contest called "The Brusa Foundation Award" that awards £5000 "for a one movement work of any duration for Symphonic Orchestra." Submissions must be tonal in nature, and applicants must be under the age of thirty.

==== Awardees ====
- 2024: Güray Kapucu, Bird in a Cage
- 2025: Asadbek Turgunov, Maqom Simfoniya

== Compositional style ==
Currently, she is best known for her orchestral works recorded in five volumes on the Naxos Records label. She is often inspired by works of literature and art as well as of music of all ages but the latter are never quoted or imitated in her works. These include two symphonies, a requiem, a Stabat Mater, the tone poem Florestan, based on the Florestan side of Robert Schumann's personality; the Nittemero Symphony, inspired by the words night and day in ancient Greek; the tone poem Messidor, which alludes strongly to (without actually quoting) Felix Mendelssohn's incidental music to A Midsummer Night's Dream (the work is dedicated to her husband), a fanfare, an adagio, "Firelights", a requiescat, "Favole", "Merlin", "Simply Largo", all of which for orchestras of different sizes, among other works.

In a 2016 interview, Brusa explained her compositional style,

Personally I feel near to Neo-Tonalism and particularly to Neo-Romanticism, to be understood in the original sense of the word (and historical period), yet often used generically or misunderstood. My music comes from emotional sensations and visions, supported by rational forms and techniques, without technical and emotional complacency and notational graphics. I support the return to a "New Humanism" with the introduction of new forms and the revaluation of other well-established ones, but with new internal structures; certainly not a mere return to past models.

=== Reviews ===
Brusa has been described as, "...that modern rarity, a convincing 21st-century symphonist with a powerful stylistic voice and some urgent substance to communicate." A review of the Atlanta Symphony's performance of Brusa's Adagio for String Orchestra in 2022 stated,

Brusa’a Adagio is an impressive but dark essay, tightly wound in emotional expression despite its nearly neo-tonal language. There is much contrapuntal texture and lyricism, but what strikes the listener most is the tension permeating its textures. It takes the listener through the wringer, but afterward, the feeling is that the experience was well worth it.

Another review of the same concert called the work "...gloriously subversive."

== Notable recordings ==
- Orchestral Works, volume 1 (Florestan, Messidor, La Triade, Nittemero Symphony, Fanfare): Naxos 8.555266, 21st Century Classics
- Orchestral Works, volume 2 (Firelights, Adagio, Wedding Song, Requiescat, Suite Grotesque, Favole): Naxos 8.555267, 21st Century Classics
- Orchestral Works, volume 3 (Symphony No.1, Merlin): Naxos 8.573437, 21st Century Classics
- Orchestral Works, volume 4 (Symphony No.2, Simply Largo): Naxos 8.574263, 21st Century Classics
- Orchestral Works, volume 5 (Requiem, Stabat Mater): Naxos 8.574589, 21st Century Classics
