= Paolo Cavallone =

Italian composer, pianist, and poet

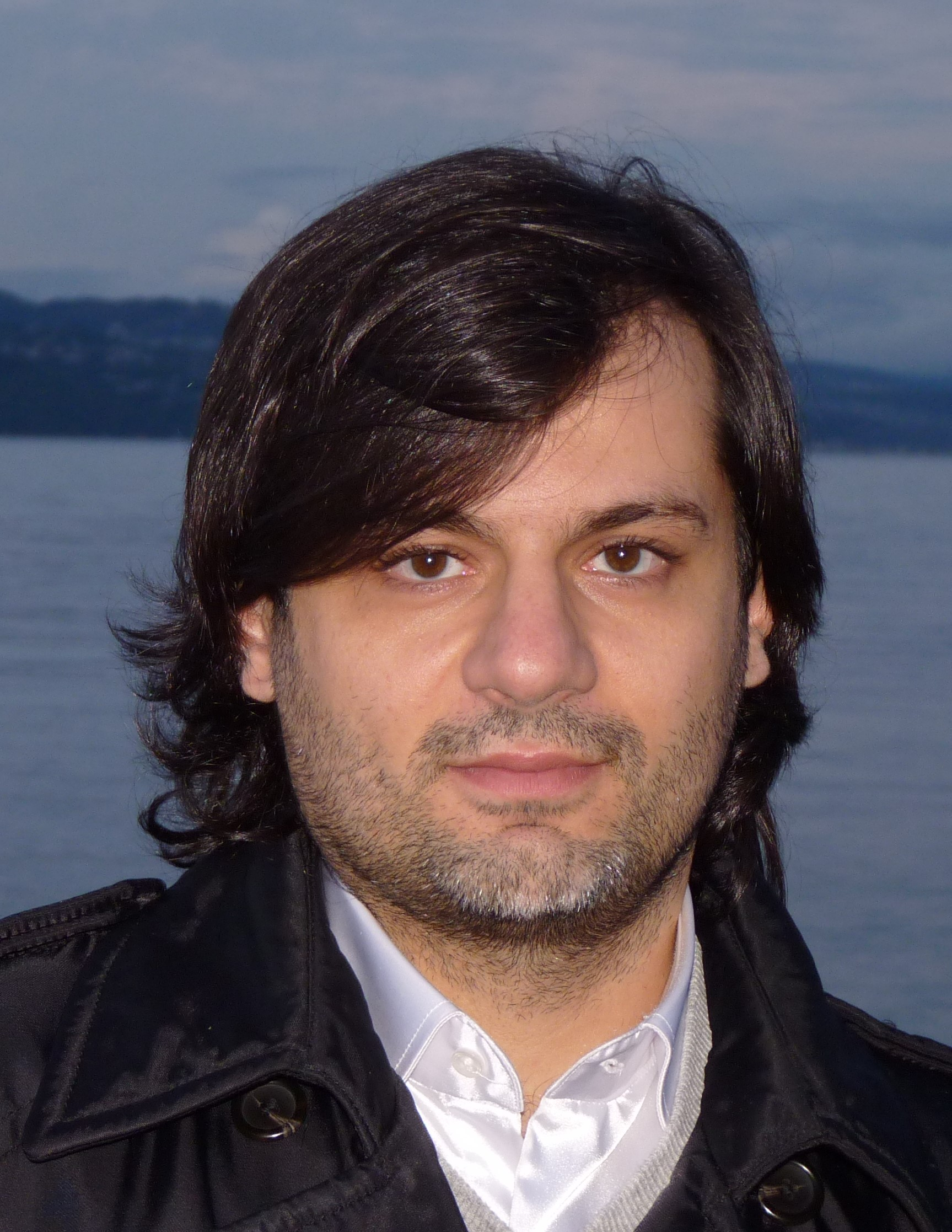
Composer Paolo Cavallone in 2010

Paolo Cavallone (born in Sulmona in 1975) is an Italian composer, pianist, and poet. He is considered a major composer of today's music scene especially for the aesthetic openness of his works.

== Biography ==
Paolo Cavallone graduated in Piano (Master - 1999), Composition (Master - 2001), and Band Orchestration (Master - 1999) at the State Conservatory "Casella" of L'Aquila (Italy). Cavallone was then awarded a place at the Accademia Chigiana in Siena and at the Accademia Nazionale di Santa Cecilia in Rome where, from 2002 to 2004, he studied Composition under Azio Corghi. Cavallone received also a Laurea Magistrale (Master) in Modern Literature (2001) from the Università degli Studi dell'Aquila and a Ph.D. (2009) from the State University of New York (USA).

Cavallone’s compositions, published by Rai Com, have been broadcast by Radio Rai, Radio France, Radio New Zealand, Radio Capodistria, University Radio UFRGS (Brazil), and other radio stations. Cavallone’s works have been released on CDs by Da Vinci Classics, Albany Records, Tactus, GuitArt, Domani Musica, and Suono Sonda. Among the commissions received: Siemens Foundation (2011), Dilijan Music Series of Los Angeles (2006), Orchestre National de Bretagne-Mitteleuropa Orchestra (2017), Società Barattelli of L’Aquila (2007).

As a director he made the animated movie "Magasin de metaphores" (France-Italy, 2016-2019/ short film 2023). In 2024, his collection of poems "Suoni ulteriori" came out (Gruppo Editoriale Santelli - Poetica).

He is currently Professor of Composition at the Conservatory "Marcello" of Venezia (Italy). In 2013-14, Paolo Cavallone has been Professor of Composition at the State Conservatory “Respighi” of Latina (Italy) and, in 2010, at the New Zealand School of Music (Victoria University of Wellington). In 2009-10, he was appointed Research Collaborator at the State University of New York (USA).

Cavallone has given guest lectures at the Manhattan School of Music (USA), University of Pittsburgh, McMaster University in Hamilton (Canada), Conservatorio di Santa Cecilia of Rome, and other institutes. His works have been a subject of seminars in Universities and conferences in Italy and abroad.

== Discography ==
- Miroirs d'esquisses, monographic CD, Da Vinci Classics (C01144), Japan, 2026 performers: Roberto Fabbriciani, Stroma ensemble, Mitteleuropa Orchestra, Antonio Merici.
- Hóros, monographic CD, Tactus (TC.970304), Italy, 2017 performers: Stroma ensemble, Quartetto Guadagnini, Rohan De Saram, Magnus Andersson, Pascal Gallois.
- Confini, CD monografico e DVD, Tactus (TC.970302), Italy, 2012 performers: Roberto Fabbriciani, Magnus Andersson, Jean Kopperud, Stephen Gosling, Lorna Windsor, Luca Sanzò, James Avery, Movses Pogossian, Tony Arnold.
- Contrasto, monographic CD, Domani Musica (DMCD0301), Italy, 2002
- Flute XXI, CD compilation: Hóros per flauto e ensemble, Tactus (TC.980090), Italy, 2020
- 1900-2000, CD compilation: Au réveil il était midi (b), guitar Antonio d’Augello, GuitArt 042012, Magazine n. 67, Italy, July 2012
- Extreme Measures, CD compilation: (Dis)tensioni for clarinet and piano. Albany Records (TROY 1217-18), USA, 2010
- web & hubs, CD compilation: En coup de foudre for violin and piano Suono Sonda, n.7, Italy, 2009
- La Piega, Il Taglio, CD compilation: Contrasto, string quartet Suono Sonda, n.2, Italy, 2004

== Poetry ==
- Suoni ulteriori, Canzoniere, Gruppo Editoriale Santelli - Poetica, Italy, 2024
- Il D'Annunzio Segreto, a one-act play with music and dance, 2022

== Bibliography ==
- Cresti R., “Paolo Cavallone, pieno di Mondo”, in Musica presente, LIM, Lucca, Italy, 2019 p. 792-798
- Dagnino E., ‘’La percezione, l’invisibile’’ (analytical article). In : Suono Sonda, n.7, Genova, Italy, 2009 pp. 64-68
- Domenici C. L.,” O Pianista Expandido: Complexidade Técnica e Estilística na obra Confini de Paolo Cavallone” . in : Congresso da Associaçao Nacional de pesquisa e pós graduação em Música, 21. Uberlândia (Brasil), UFU: 2011, p. 1197-1203
- Domenici, C. L., “Beyond notation. The Oral memory of Confini". In : Performa, encontros de investigaçao em performance, 5, 2011, Aveiro. University of Aveiro (Portugal), pp. 1–14
- Domenici, C. L., ‘’Three instances of composer-performer collaboration : the performer’s point of view’’. In: Second Meeting of the European Platform for Artistic Research in Music, Rome, Italy, 2012 pp.20-22
- Frengel M., The unorthodox guitar, Oxford University Press, New York, USA, 2017 (p. 97 Example: Au réveil il était midi)
- Mastropietro A., ‘’In-side Out... il suono’’ (analytical article) In: Suono Sonda, n.2, Genova, Italy, 2004 pp. 40-44
- Nardacci, F., ‘’Riflessi e dinamiche della contemporaneità nella musica. Intervista a Paolo Cavallone’’ . In AA. VV. Universi Sonori, Nuove Tendenze Edizioni, Lucca, Italie, 2015 A collection of interviews to contemporary composers (Paolo Cavallone, Ennio Morricone, Giorgio Gaslini)
- Ranalli A., ‘’Frammenti Lirici sulle note di Paolo Cavallone’’. In : Rondò, n.3. 2008 pp. 10-13
- Tarquinio G., Dal ‘’cilindro’’ di Tosti. Discografia generale dei compositori abruzzesi. Documenti di storia musicale abruzzese, 4, Libreria Musicale Italiana (LIM), Lucca, Italy, 2008 p. 59 (dettagli sul CD Contrasto)
- Documentary. Titolo : Ritratto di un compositore, Paolo Cavallone. Video 26 minutes. Director Tulliani D., RAI Trade, Italia, 2009 (publisher : Tactus, TC.970302, 2012)
- Interview/documentary on satellite channel Sky 835, AB Channel (interview with Tiziana Le Donne – episode dedicated to Paolo Cavallone). 15 Minuti (Pescara) October 13, 2015
