= Umberto Benedetti Michelangeli =

Italian conductor (born 1952)

Umberto Benedetti Michelangeli, also Umberto Benedetti Michelangeli Jr. (born July 16, 1952 in Montichiari, Brescia) is an Italian conductor, nephew of famous Italian pianist Arturo Benedetti Michelangeli.

== Biography ==
He started his musical studies first with his aunt, then at the Milan Conservatory with Mario Conter, Bruno Bettinelli, Mario Gusella and finally with Franco Ferrara. He regularly conducts leading orchestras both in Italy and Europe. Of particular importance is his commitment to the Mantua Chamber Orchestra, of which he has been the Principal Conductor since 1984, and whose artistic merits were rewarded with the Abbiati Prize in 1997.

In 2004 Benedetti Michelangeli and the Mantua Chamber Orchestra realised a very successful Beethoven cycle including the symphonies, the concertos and some of his symphonic-choral works and in the period 2005-07 they were leading performers in the Mozart Fest, in a cycle dedicated to Mozart's sacred music. He also collaborated with the Camerata Academica in Salzburg for the 1996 Schubertiade and with the Kammerorchester Basel, as the Chief Guest Conductor.

Umberto Benedetti Michelangeli made his début at the Rossini Opera Festival in 2006 with Mozart's Die Schuldigkeit des ersten Gebots and Rossini's La cambiale di matrimonio.

Among the works he has conducted, he has devoted a series of concerts to the complete performance of Mozart's sacred music. In 2017, his recording for the Sony label of Mozart's arias, in collaboration with the soprano Regula Mühlemann, earned the Maestro the "Preis der deutschen Schallplattenkritik" (German Record Critics' Prize).

Benedetti Michelangeli is often on the podium of piano festivals dedicated to Arturo Benedetti Michelangeli, as was the case for the Brescia and Bergamo Review which featured Alexander Lonquich, Federico Colli, Yuja Wang and Mitsuko Uchida who were awarded the Michelangeli Prize.
