= Bruno Bettinelli =

Italian composer and teacher

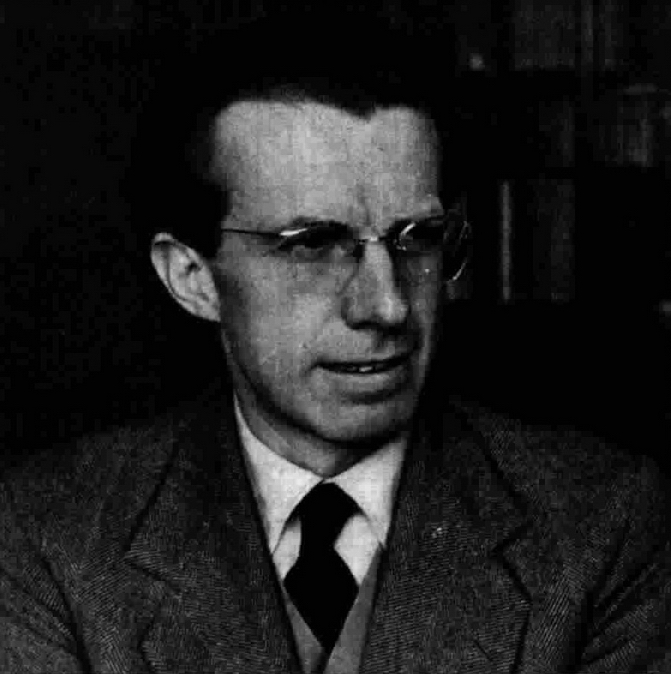
Bruno Bettinelli in Radiocorriere magazine, 1954.

Bruno Bettinelli (4 June 1913 – 8 November 2004) was an Italian composer and teacher.

== Biography ==
Bruno Bettinelli was born in Milan, where he studied at the Conservatorio "G. Verdi" in Milan, under the tutelage of Giulio Cesare Paribeni and Renzo Bossi. He held the title of professor of composition at that same institute and he trained many notable contemporary Italian musicians, including Claudio Abbado, Emiliano Bucci, Elisabetta Brusa, Gilberto Serembe, Danilo Lorenzini, Roberto Cacciapaglia, Bruno Canino, Aldo Ceccato, Riccardo Chailly, Azio Corghi, Armando Gentilucci, Riccardo Muti, Maurizio Pollini, Uto Ughi, Angelo Paccagnini, Bruno Zanolini, Silvia Bianchera, Umberto Benedetti Michelangeli, Francesco Degrada, Massimo Di Gesu, Carlo Alessandro Landini, Massimo Anfossi, Caterina Calderoni, Barbara Rettagliati, Massimo Berzolla and many others. He also taught the Italian singer-songwriter Gianna Nannini.

He received many international awards for composition, including a prize from Accademia Nazionale di Santa Cecilia in Rome in the 1940s. He has also worked in musicology and music criticism.

His compositions are currently performed all over the world. Bettinelli's music is published primarily by Ricordi, Suvini Zerboni and Sonzogno.

He was elected an Academic of Accademia Nazionale di Santa Cecilia (Rome), as well as a member of the Luigi Cherubini National Academy in Florence.

Bruno Bettinelli died in Milan in 2004 at the age of 91.

As a memorial to Bruno Bettinelli, Milan's Edizioni Musicali European (EME), in collaboration with the magazines "Cartellina" and "Chorus," established a national competition for choral composition in his name.

== Music ==
Bettinelli was an author of symphonic, choral, opera, and chamber music.

His younger works incorporated a contrapuntal neoclassicism, influenced by Igor Stravinsky, Paul Hindemith and Béla Bartók and by the Italian composers Alfredo Casella, Goffredo Petrassi and Gian Francesco Malipiero.

His later music evolved constantly and incorporated new elements: atonality, dodecaphony (which, however, Bettinelli used in a very personal and never orthodox way), as well as the new instrumental techniques (multiphonic, harmonic, and other similar instrumental effects). His music flows into a free and personal chromatic language, always full of refined timbres and effectively eloquent gestures, endowed with formal structures of remarkable expressive rigour.

His numerous symphonic compositions make him the most important Italian composer of symphonies in the second half of the twentieth century.

== List of works (selection) ==
- CD and scores of works by Bruno Bettinelli

=== Orchestral music ===
- Choral obstinate for large orchestra (1938)
- Movimento sinfonico n. 1 for orchestra (1938)
- Sinfonia da camera in quattro tempi for orchestra (1938) (a.k.a. Symphony No. 1)
- Due invenzioni for string orchestra (1939)
- Concerto per orchestra in tre tempi (1940)
- Introduzione for string orchestra (1941)
- Fantasia e fuga su temi gregoriani (Fantasy and Fugue on Gregorian themes) for string orchestra (1944)
- Divertimento for small orchestra (1944)
- Concerto da camera for small orchestra (1952)
- Concerto for piano and orchestra (1952–1953)
- Sinfonia breve for orchestra (1954) (a.k.a. Symphony No. 4)
- Musica for string orchestra (1958)
- Preludio elegiaco (Elegiac Prelude) for orchestra (1959)
- Episodi for orchestra (1961–1962)
- Concerto for 2 pianos and chamber orchestra (1962)
- 3° Concerto for orchestra (1964)
- Concerto n. 2 for piano and orchestra (1968)
- Varianti for orchestra (1970)
- Studio for orchestra (1973)
- Sinfonia n. 5 for orchestra (1975)
- Sinfonia n. 6 for orchestra (1976)
- Sinfonia n. 7 for small orchestra (1978)
- Contrasti for orchestra (1979)
- Concerto for guitar and string orchestra with vibraphone ad libitum (1981)
- Quadruplum for orchestra (1981)
- Concerto for violin and orchestra (1982–1983)
- Alternanze for orchestra (1983)
- Omaggio a Stravinsky (Homage to Stravinsky) for chamber orchestra (1984)
- Strutture for small orchestra (1985)
- 4° Concerto for orchestra (1988)
- 3 Studi d'interpretazione for string orchestra (1990)

=== Operas ===
- Il pozzo e il pendolo (The Pit and the Pendulum), an opera in one act from Edgar Allan Poe (1957)
- La Smorfia, an opera in one act and two scenes, libretto by Riccardo Bacchelli (1959)
- Count down, an opera in one act, libretto by Antonello Madau Diaz (1969)

=== Instrumental music ===
- Improvisation for guitar (1970)
- Studio da concerto for solo clarinet (1971)
- Cinque Preludi (Five Preludes) for guitar (1971)
- Studio da concerto for harpsichord (1972)
- Musica per sette per gruppo da camera (Music for seven for chamber group) (1975)
- Sonata breve for guitar (1976)
- Due movimenti for viola and piano (1977)
- Etudes for guitar (1977)
- Studio da concerto for solo bassoon (1977)
- Divertimento a due for 2 guitars (1982)
- Musica a due for flute and guitar (1982)
- Come una cadenza for guitar (1983)
- Dialogo for flute and piano (1983)
- 5 + 5 for double mixed quintet (1984)
- Tre pezzi per pianoforte (Three pieces for piano) (1984)
- Studio da concerto for solo cello (1991)
- Trio for Strings (1993)

=== Polyphonic choral music ===
- Tre liriche corali di Ungaretti (Three choral lyrics of Ungaretti) (1940)
- Liriche di Ungaretti for chorus a cappella (1971)
- Sono una creatura (I am a creature), cantata for chorus and orchestra, text by Giuseppe Ungaretti (1971)
- Poesie di Tiziana for female choir, text by Tiziana Fumagalli (1978)
- Cantata No 2 "In Nativitate Domini" for soprano and orchestra (1982)
- Cantata No 3 for chorus and orchestra, text by Thomas Campanella (1985)
- Tre mottetti (Three motets) for choir of mixed voices (1985)
- Dittico ambrosiano for choir of four voices (1997)
- Missa Brevis (1997)
- Vocalizzo su Amen for choir of four mixed voices (1997)

=== Other choral music ===
- Belina come te (Beautiful Like You) for four-part mixed choir (2001)
- E la bela de oflaga for four-part male choir (1985)
- Dormi o bel bambin (Sleep, o pretty baby) for four-part male choir (1985)
- La moretina for four-part male choir
- Alzando gli occhi al cielo (Raising the eyes to heaven) for four-part male choir (1998)
- L'erba rosa (The pink grass) for four-part male choir (1996)
- La cartolina for four-part male choir(1995)
- Varda i mori che bate le ore for four-part male choir (1996)
- Se la te domanda (If you ask it) for four-part male choir (1996)
- Tre canti popolari lombardi (Three popular Lombardy songs) for mixed choir: - Pover usellin - Ninna nanna del Bambin Gesù - Ciapa cinque
