= Gilberto Serembe =

Italian conductor and professor (born 1955)

Gilberto Serembe (born 17 December 1955, in Milan) is an Italian conductor and professor.

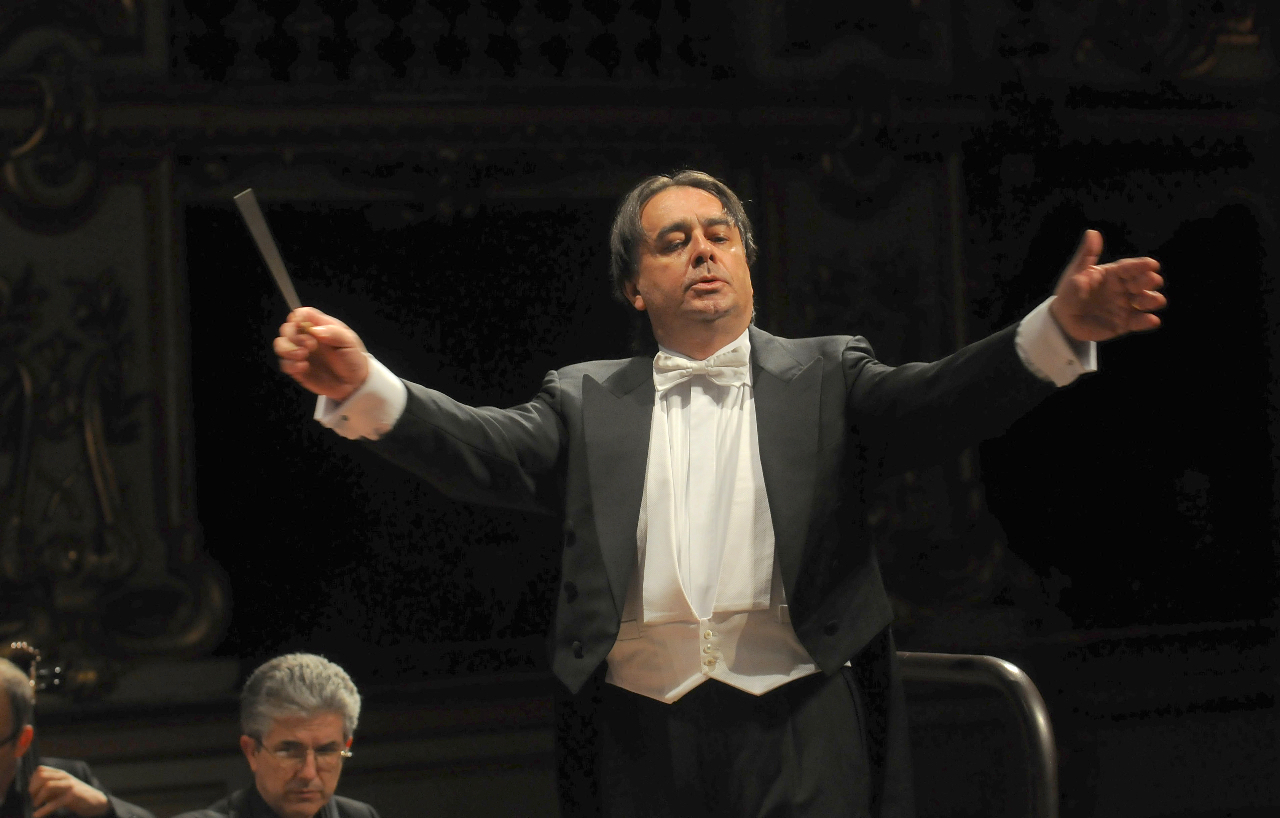
Gilberto Serembe

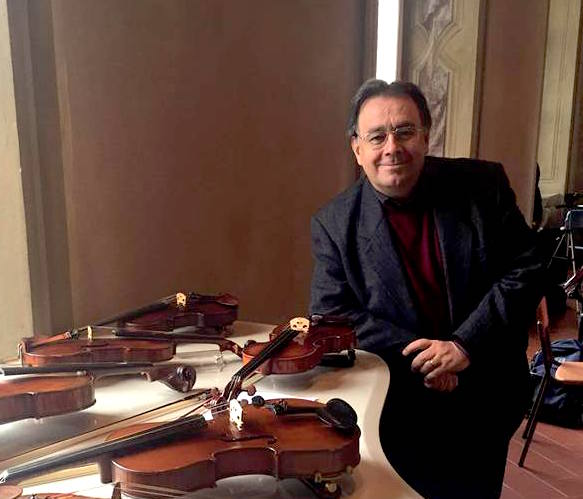
Gilberto Serembe

== Biography ==
Serembe studied Composition and Conducting at the Conservatorio "Giuseppe Verdi" in Milan with Bruno Bettinelli and Mario Gusella. He later attended the Superior Course in Conducting at the "Accademia Chigiana" in Siena under the guidance of Franco Ferrara.

He conducted many renowned Italian and European orchestras among which: RAI Symphony Orchestra of Turin, Orchestra della Toscana of Florence, "Arturo Toscanini" Symphony Orchestra of Parma, Teatro Regio of Turin, Teatro Massimo of Palermo, "Pomeriggi Musicali" of Milan, "Haydn" Symphony Orchestra of Trento and Bolzano, Göteborgs Symphoniker (Sweden), BRT Filharmonisch Orkest Brussels (Belgium), Turku Philharmonic (Finland).

He held classes in conducting at the Music Academy in Pescara and he was Professor of Conducting at the Conservatorio "Luca Marenzio" in Brescia. In 2013, he founded the Italian Conducting Academy in Milan, where he serves as principal teacher. His students have included Alvaro Albiach, Roberto Fores Veses, Riccardo Frizza, Fabio Mastrangelo, Matteo Pagliari, Daniele Rustioni. He is married to the composer Elisabetta Brusa.
