= Sonia Bo =

Italian pianist, conductor and composer

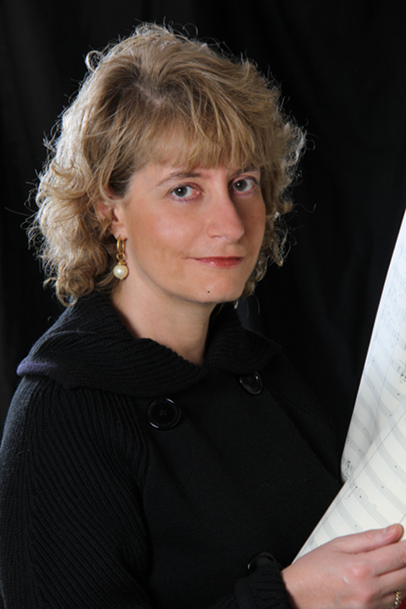
Sonia Bo Portrait

Sonia Bo (born 27 March 1960) is an Italian pianist, conductor and composer. Her works have been performed at a number of festivals, including She has won a number of awards, including first prizes in the Guido d’Arezzo Composers Competition, the composition competition of the European Cultural Foundation, the composition competition G. Savagnone in Rome, and the international composition competition Alpe Adria Giovani in Trieste. She was awarded the Friuli Prize and the Ennio Porrino Prize in 1985, and has also won the Franco Evangelisti Prize, and the Valentino Bucchi Prize.

== Life ==
Sonia Bo was born in Lecco, Italy, on 27 March 1960, and studied with Renato Dionisi and Azio Corghi at the Milan Conservatory, where she graduated in 1985. In 1988 she continued her studies with Franco Donatoni at the Accademia di Santa Cecilia in Rome.

After completing her studies, she taught music at universities in Ferrara, Verona, Pesaro and Piacenza. In 1997 she took a position teaching composition at the Conservatorio di Milano. She married composer Giuseppe Colardo. She composes for orchestra, chamber ensemble, choir, voice, piano and organ as well as electroacoustic music. She has won a number of awards and prizes, and her works are performed internationally in Asia, Europe and North America, including at festivals, such as Festival Focus in New York, the Musica Nova in Sofia, Traiettorie sonore in Como, Nuova consonanza and Nuovi Spazi Musicali in Rome, Antidogma in Turin and the Venice Biennale.

== Honors and awards ==
- First prize, Guido d’Arezzo Composers Competition (1985)
- First prize, composition competition of the European Cultural Foundation (1985)
- First prize, composition competition G. Savagnone in Rome (1986)
- First Prize, the international composition competition Alpe Adria Giovani in Trieste (1988)
- Gold plate, the international Premio Città di Trieste (1995)
- Acknowledgment, Okanagan Music Festival for Composers (1983)
- Friuli Prize (1985)
- Ennio Porrino Prize (1985)
- Franco Evangelisti Prize (1987)
- Valentino Bucchi Prize (1989)

== Works ==
Bo composes orchestral, chamber, choral, vocal, piano, organ, and electroacoustic works. Selected compositions include:

- Frammenti da Jacopone
- Da una lettura di Husserl
- Quartetto
- Due Bagatelle
- Synopsis
- Concerto for chamber orchestra
