= Azio Corghi =

Italian composer (1937–2022)

- Born: 9 March 1937; Cirié, Italy
- Died: 17 November 2022 (aged 85)
- Education: Turin Conservatory; Milan Conservatory
- Occupations: Composer; Academic teacher; Musicologist
- Organizations: Accademia Nazionale di Santa Cecilia
- Awards: Order of Merit of the Italian Republic

Azio Corghi (9 March 1937 – 17 November 2022) was an Italian composer, academic teacher and musicologist. He composed mostly operas and chamber music. His operas are often based on literature, especially in collaboration with José Saramago as librettist. His first opera, Gargantua, was premiered at the Teatro Regio in Turin in 1984, his second opera, Blimunda, was first performed at La Scala in Milan in the 1989/90 season, and his third opera, Divara – aqua e sangue, was premiered in 1993 at the Theater Münster, Germany. He taught composition at the Accademia Nazionale di Santa Cecilia in Rome, among other academies. In 2005, he was awarded the Order of Merit of the Italian Republic.

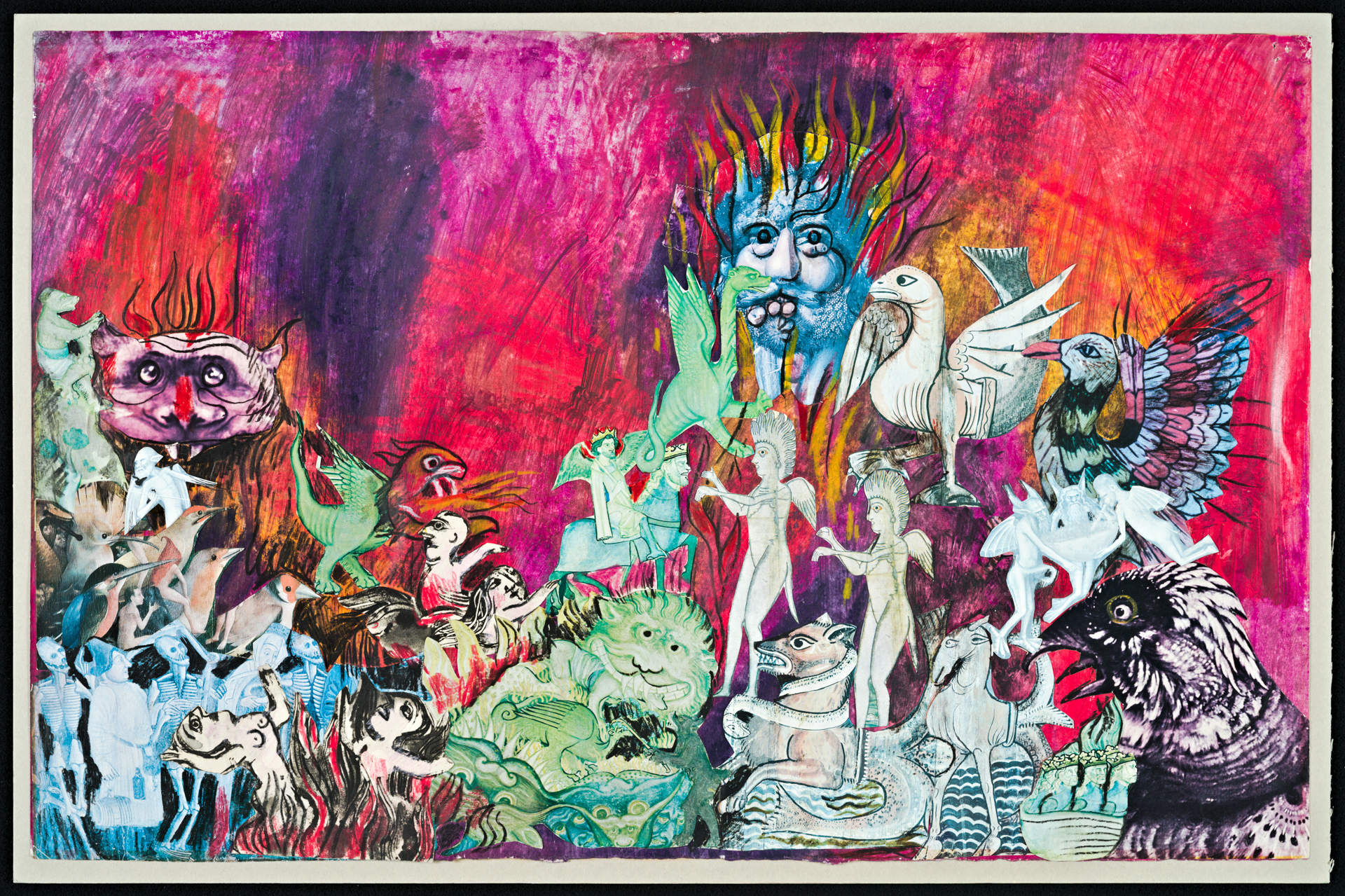
Sketchbook image for Gargantua

== Life and career ==
Born in Cirié, in the Province of Turin, on 9 March 1937, Corghi was interested in both painting and music. His first instrument was an accordion. From 1956, he studied the piano at the Turin Conservatory with Mario Zanfi. After graduation in 1962, he moved to the Milan Conservatory, where he studied composition with Bruno Bettinelli, choral music with Amerigo Bortone, conducting with Antonino Votto, and polyphonic vocal composition with Guido Farina. Corghi's orchestral composition Intavolature, performed at La Fenice in Venice, won the Ricordi composition competition of 1967.

Corghi began teaching at the Turin Conservatory that year. Later he also taught at the Milan and Parma conservatories, the Accademia Musicale Chigiana in Siena, the Perosi Academy in Biella, and the Accademia Filarmonica di Bologna. Corghi held the chair in composition at the Accademia Nazionale di Santa Cecilia in Rome and had many famous students, including Antonello Allemandi, Sonia Bo, Mauro Bonifacio, Paolo Cavallone, Alberto Colla, Girolamo Deraco, Silvia Colasanti, Ludovico Einaudi, Ivan Fedele, Daniele Gatti, Luca Francesconi, Fabio Mengozzi, Vito Palumbo, Marco Stroppa. He was awarded the Massimo Mila Award in 1991 for his dedication to teaching.

=== Stage works ===
Casa Ricordi entrusted Corghi with the preparation of a critical edition of Rossini's opera L'italiana in Algeri for a production at the Pesaro Festival which gave him insight in the construction of operas. His own first opera Gargantua, after Rabelais' novel Gargantua and Pantagruel, received its premiere at the Teatro Regio in 1984 conducted by Donato Renzetti. He composed his second opera, Blimunda to a libretto by José Saramago who became his longtime friend and collaborator. It was first performed at La Scala in Milan in the 1989/90 season, directed by Jérôme Savary and conducted by Zoltán Peskó. The author, who would be awarded the Nobel Prize in 1998, and the composer worked together again on Divara – aqua e sangue, which was premiered at the Theater Münster, in German, on 31 October 1993. This production was recorded.

In 1999, Corghi was commissioned to compose an opera for La Scala, Tat'jana, based on Chekhov's play Tatyana Repina. It was premiered in 2000, directed by Peter Stein and conducted by Will Humburg. In 2001 he composed Cruci-Verba, again for Münster, which combined readings from and comment on Saramago's The Gospel According to Jesus Christ; it was combined with Liszt's Via crucis. In 2002, he wrote the opera Senja for Münster, based on Chekhov's On the High Road. De paz e de guerra was another collaboration with Saramago, in 2002.

In 2005, Corghi composed Il dissoluto assolto, a musical in one act to a libretto by the composer and Saramago, which was co-produced by La Scala and Teatro San Carlos in Lisbon. It was directed by Patrizia Frini and conducted by Marko Letonja. He was commissioned in 2008 by Ensemble Punto to compose the opera Giocasta to celebrate the quincentenary of Andrea Palladio, to a libretto by Maddalena Mazzocut-Mis based on Oedipus Rex by Sophocles, because an opera with the subject by Andrea Gabrieli was performed when Palladio's Teatro Olimpico was opened in 1585; Giocasta was performed there on 19 June 2009. For the bicentenary of Verdi in 2013, he wrote Madreterra, a sacred dialogue between Verdi and Pasolini, which was performed at the Teatro Regio in Parma on 9 October 2013.

=== Orchestral works ===
When Rossini's bicentenary was celebrated in 1992, Corghi composed the Suite dodo, based on some of Rossini's Péchés de vieillesse, and his ballet Un petit train de plaisir was performed at the Teatro Rossini in Pesaro, broadcast live. He wrote a concert etude, ... ça ira! in 1997 for the Umberto Micheli International Piano Competition. The same year, he transcribed ariettas from Nuits d'été à Pausilippe for the bicentenary of Gaetano Donizetti. In 2000 he completed Amori incrociati after Aldo Busi's version of The Decameron, to be played by the RAI National Symphony Orchestra. In 2001 Corghi wrote … malinconia, ninfa gentil for the bicentenary of Vincenzo Bellini. He composed in 2002, on a commission from the Santa Cecilia National Academy, De paz e de guerra to a libretto by Saramago. On 8 July 2004, he performed ¿Pia?, a music-and-drama dialogue inspired by Marguerite Yourcenar's Le Dialogue dans le Marécage at the Teatro dei Rozzi in Siena, commissioned by the Chigiana Music Academy. He wrote Poema Sinfonico for the 25th anniversary of La Scala Philharmonic Orchestra, first performed on 29 January 2007 at La Scala conducted by Riccardo Chailly.

=== Private life ===
Corghi was married to Magda Bodrito who had a degree in literature. The couple had two children. They lived in Guidizzolo from 1973.

Corghi died on 17 November 2022, at age 85.

== Awards and legacy ==
In 1994, Corghi became a Fellow of the Santa Cecilia National Academy in Rome. In 2005, he was made a Grand Officer of the Order of Merit of the Italian Republic.

La Scala reacted to his death stating that it joined "in the condolences of the Italian and international music world for the passing of Azio Corghi, composer, musicologist and teacher who was an undisputed protagonist of the contemporary music scene as well as of La Scala's programming".

== Works ==
Corghi's compositions were published by Casa Ricordi:

=== Operas ===
- Gargantua (Teatro Regio Turin, 1994)
- Blimunda (Teatro Lirico, Milan, May 1990)
- Divara – Wasser und Blut (Münster, October 1993)
- Isabella (Pesaro, August 1996)
- Rinaldo & C. (Catania, October 1997)
- Tat'jana (Teatro alla Scala Milan, October 2000)
- Sen'ja (Münster, March 2003)
- Il dissoluto assolto (Teatro alla Scala, Milan, March 2005)
- Giocasta (Vicenza, August 2008)

=== Chamber music ===
- Ricordando te, lontano (1963) for soprano and piano, G. Ungaretti, A. Bertolucci e S. Aleramo
- Stereofonie x 4 (1967) for flute, cello, organ and percussion
- Actus I (1975) for ten wind instruments
- Actus II (1976) for viola and piano
- Intermedi e Canzoni (1986) for solo trombone
- Chiardiluna (1987) flute and guitar
- ...promenade (1989) for flute, clarinet, violin and cello
- animi motus (1994) for string quartet and electronics
- ... ça ira! (1996) piano concert studio
- a 'nsunnari... (1998) for soprano, flute, clarinet, guitar, violin and cello
- Syncopations (2006) for solo violin, a compulsory piece for the Paganini Award
- Tang'Jok-Her (2008) for viola alone, dedicated to Anna Serova
- Redobles y Consonancias (2018) for La Soñada (guitar and 11 strings), dedicated to guitarist Christian Lavernier
