= Giorgio Fanan =

Italian Music collector (1929–2025)

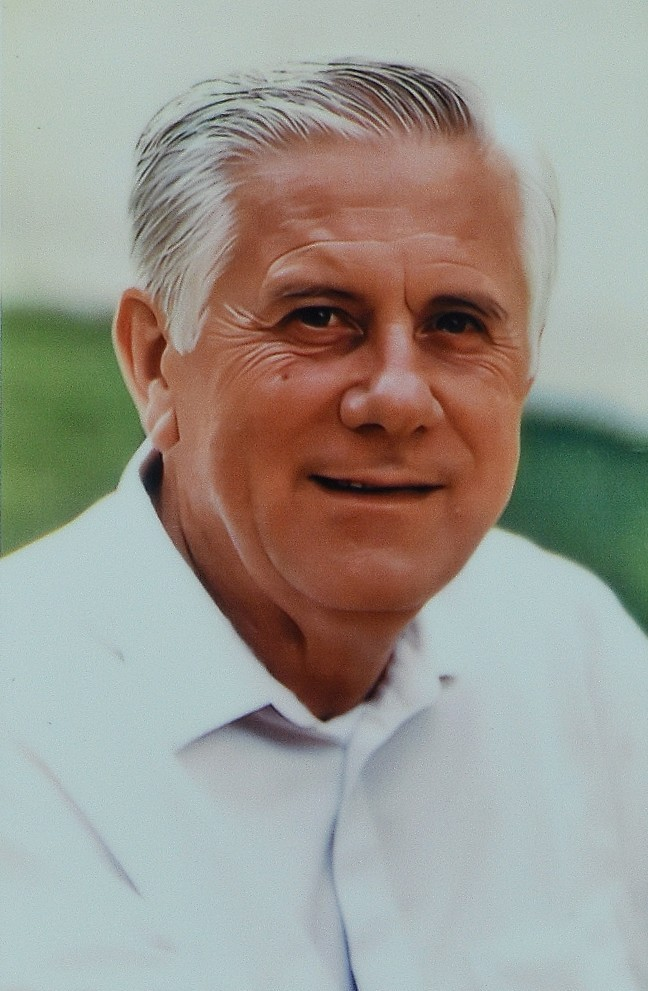
- Portrait, 2025
- Born: November 18, 1929; Arquà Polesine, Italy
- Died: July 20, 2025 (aged 95); Rovigo, Italy
- Spouse: Franca Bazzano
- Children: 2

Giorgio Fanan (18 November 1929 – 20 July 2025) was an Italian musical collector, bibliographer, and musicologist.

== Life ==
=== Collector of music ===
Giorgio Fanan was regarded as one of the most prominent Italian collectors of musical materials in the 20th century.

His passion for books began in early childhood: in 1937, at just eight years old, he started collecting sheet music from the local town band, in Arquà Polesine. Over the course of more than eighty years, he assembled an extraordinary music library comprising over 100,000 items, establishing relationships with musicians, musicologists, antiquarian dealers, and collectors worldwide.

His holdings are particularly notable for their breadth and rarity, including: opera librettos, autograph letters by composers, early printed treatises on music, first editions of operatic works, musical manuscripts, historical musical memorabilia, fine bindings, and a philatelic collection focused on musical themes.

=== Turin and the return to Polesine ===
For over three decades, Fanan served as one of the managing directors within the Agnelli family's enterprises in Turin. During this time, he shared his passion for music with Gianni Agnelli and Umberto Agnelli; Marella Agnelli notably gifted him a Steinway & Sons grand piano.

In 1987, shortly before retirement, Fanan moved with his family—his wife Franca Bazzano and their children, Andreina and Vittorio—from Turin to Villa Cornoldi Fanan in Fratta Polesine, where he relocated the entire collection. A close friend and neighbor was Giancarlo Matteotti, who presented him with several personal belongings of his father, Giacomo Matteotti.

The cultural and scholarly value of the Fanan Library has been acknowledged internationally. Dutch conductor and musicologist Ton Koopman expressed admiration for the collection, while in 1997, Giancarlo Rostirolla described Fanan as "one of the most renowned collectors of ancient and modern bibliographic-musical materials of our time".

The Fanan Library is officially listed in the Répertoire International des Sources Musicales (RISM), the global organization that catalogs music sources and archival holdings.

== Fanan collection ==
The Fanan collection offers a rich panorama of the Western classical music tradition, spanning from the Middle Ages to the contemporary era. Among the rarest items is a 10th-century antiphonary, as well as 16th-century printed music from the Venetian and Roman regions (including works by Cipriano de Rore, Palestrina, Costanzo Porta, and Morales). The library also houses both manuscript and printed works from the 17th and 18th centuries by composers such as Merula, Caccini, Giacomo Carissimi, Frescobaldi, Bononcini, Arcangelo Corelli, Benedetto Marcello, Georg Friedrich Händel, Sammartini, Tartini, and Viotti.

Of particular significance is the first complete printed edition of Mozart’s works (Breitkopf & Härtel), along with important theoretical treatises (by Leo, Paisiello, Martini), and numerous autograph manuscripts and first editions of vocal and instrumental works by major composers from Italy, France, and Germany. These include Lully, Campra, Spontini, Piccinni, Gluck, Sarti, Grétry, Asioli, Rossini, Bellini, Verdi, Boito, Wagner, Richard Strauss, Puccini, Leoncavallo, and Mascagni, as well as chamber and symphonic works by Porpora, Boccherini, Haydn, Pleyel, Beethoven, Mendelssohn, Brahms, Mahler, and Stravinsky.

In addition to its musical focus, the library includes rare literary works (by Dante, Pascoli, Verga), occasional publications (relating to Christopher Columbus, Philip I of Bourbon, and Ludwig II), and materials pertaining to modern and contemporary music (Schönberg, Berg, Castelnuovo-Tedesco, Ghedini), as well as distinguished conductors and performers (Toscanini, Bruno Walter, Karajan, Bernstein).

In 2025, ownership of the Fanan collection was transferred to the Cariparo Foundation through purchase and is managed by the Rovigo Conservatory of Music.

=== Bookplates (ex libris) ===
Fanan selected three personal bookplates (ex libris) to mark his volumes. One features Saint George and the dragon, inscribed with Ex libris Giorgio Fanan; another includes verses from Dante's Inferno (Canto I, vv. 83–84); and a third bears the motto Che incuria non disperda ("Let not neglect cause loss"), accompanied by lines from Paradiso (Canto XVII, vv. 55–56).

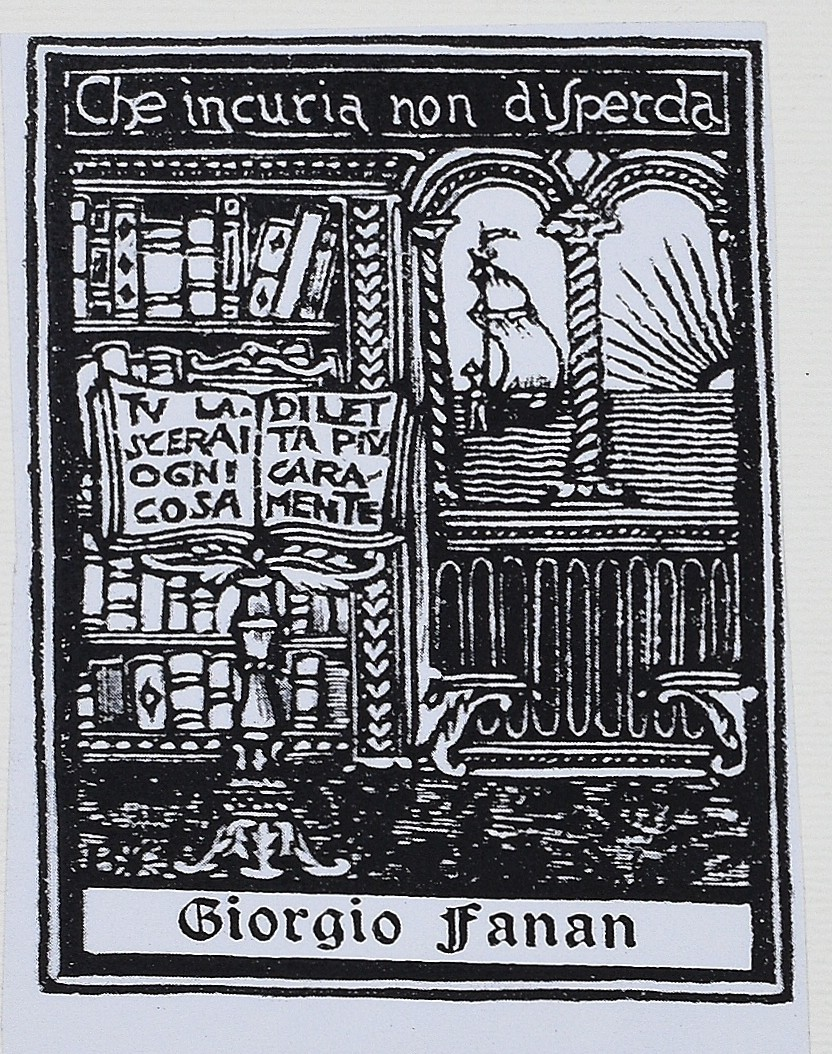
Giorgio Fanan's Ex Libris

== Bibliography ==
- Folter, Siegrun H.: Private libraries of musicians and musicologists. A bibliography of catalogs, Buren, Frits Knuf, 1987
- Fanan, Giorgio (a cura di): Drammaturgia rossiniana. Bibliografia dei libretti d'opera, di oratori, cantate ecc. posti in musica da Gioachino Rossini, Roma, Istituto di Bibliografia Musicale, 1997 ISBN 9788815134110
- Ciancio, Laura: Libretti per musica manoscritti e a stampa del fondo Shapiro nella collezione Giorgio Fanan: catalogo e indici, Lucca, LIM, 1992 ISBN 88-7096-061-7
- Forment, Bruno, van der Linden, Huub: Resounding libraries. de bibliotheek van Ton Koopman, Gent, Orpheus Institute, 2020
- Sartori, Claudio: I libretti italiani a stampa dalle origini al 1800. Catalogo analitico con 16 indici, Cuneo, Bertola & Locatelli, 1992.
- Balsamo, Luigi: La Bibliofilía, vol. 97, no. 3, 1995, pp. 305–305. JSTOR, http://www.jstor.org/stable/26213223. Accessed 4 Aug. 2025.
- Arnesano, Rosario: Rivista Italiana Di Musicologia, vol. 42, no. 2, 2007, pp. 343–50. JSTOR, http://www.jstor.org/stable/24326409. Accessed 4 Aug. 2025.
- Usula, Nicola: «Qual linea al centro». New sources and considerations on l'Incoronazione di Poppea, in: Il Saggiatore Musicale, vol. 26, no. 1, 2019, pp. 23–60. JSTOR, https://www.jstor.org/stable/27099471. Accessed 4 Aug. 2025.
- Carcereri, Luciano: Trent'anni di acquisizioni alla Biblioteca Nazionale Centrale di Roma, in: Lares, vol. 59, no. 2, 1993, pp. 309–20. JSTOR, http://www.jstor.org/stable/44629137. Accessed 4 Aug. 2025.
- Giuseppe Fagnocchi (a cura di) (2025). Primo incontro del Dottorato di ricerca Musica perseguitata e Patrimoni musicali. XL ciclo a.a. 2024-2025 Conservatorio di Rovigo. Rovigo: Conservatorio di Rovigo. ISBN 979-12-210-9525-8.
