= Giuseppe Fagnocchi =

Italian pianist and musicologist (born 1960)

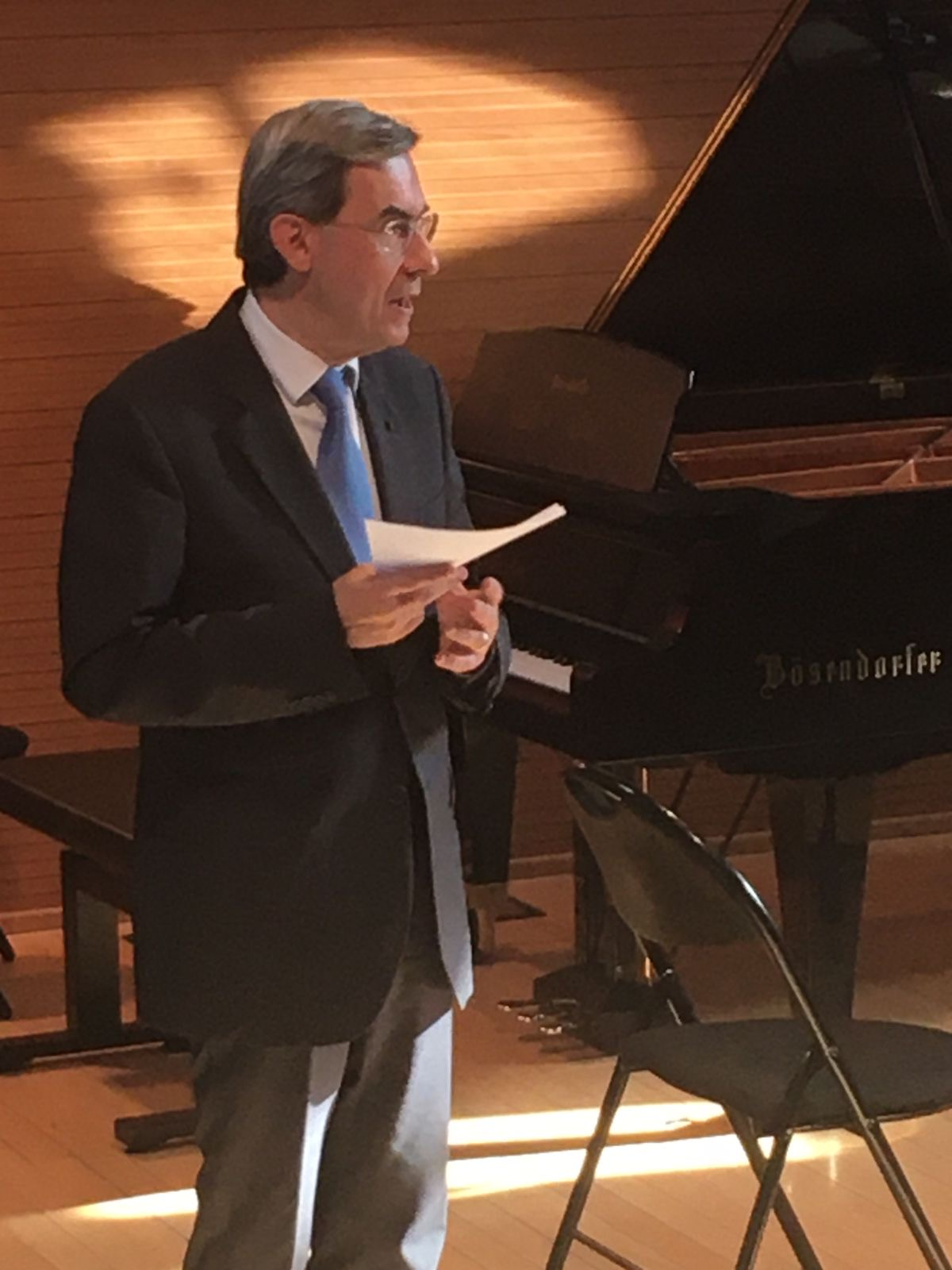
- Fagnocchi in Rovigo, 2022
- Born: September 9, 1960 (age 65); Faenza, Italy
- Occupations: Pianist; School Music Director

Giuseppe Fagnocchi (born 9 September 1960) is an Italian pianist, teacher and musicologist, one of Italy's leading experts on regulations and teaching methods related to higher education in art and music in his country.

== Biography ==
=== Education ===
Giuseppe Fagnocchi studied at the Conservatories of Music in Pesaro and Rovigo. After obtaining his degrees in harpsichord and piano, he specialised in general and experimental teaching at the University of Ferrara. After winning several prizes in international competitions and performing extensively in concerts, in 2005 he began teaching chamber music, first at the Conservatory of Foggia and then at the Conservatory of Rovigo, where he currently teaches.

=== Military career and Honours ===
From 1983 to 1985, he served as a reserve officer in the Italian Army. He is also a resident member of the Torricelliana Society of Science and Letters in Faenza, a corresponding member of the Accademia dei Concordi in Rovigo, and has been awarded the title of Knight of the Equestrian Order of St. Sylvester.

=== Conservatory of Music Director ===
First deputy director (2013-2016) and then director of the Conservatory of Rovigo from 2016 to 2019. Since 2019, he has been working on the AFAM (Higher Education in Art and Music) transition of Italian Music Conservatories, particularly in the field of musicological research following the 1999 Italian reform of music studies. Since 2021, he has been a subject expert for the National Agency for the Evaluation of Universities and Research Institutes (ANVUR). He developed, proposed and obtained accreditation for an AFAM doctoral programme at the Conservatory of Rovigo following the Decree of the Italian Minister of University and Research No. 470 of 21 February 2024. For over three decades, he has been studying the management and administrative dynamics of higher education institutions of musical culture, thanks in part to the experience he gained in numerous courses at the Faculty of Law of the University of Bologna, as a member of the evaluation committees of the Conservatories of Music of Vicenza and Terni, and as a member of the board of directors of banking foundations. During his three years as director, he formalised the activities of the conservatories of music in the Veneto region, which are grouped together in a consortium, and planned concert activities at national level on the Great War. He reconstructed the history of the Conservatory of Rovigo, publishing his findings in a monograph. He also defined the new configuration of the Conservatory of Rovigo Library as a research infrastructure, adapting it to the new scientific needs of digital humanities in the historical-artistic field.

=== Academic activity ===
A concert pianist, he mainly plays in various chamber ensembles, performing in Italy and abroad with a wide repertoire of international music, from the Baroque to the contemporary era, without neglecting collaborations with contemporary musicians from his native town Faenza, such as Aurelio Samorì, or in-depth studies of those from the past (Giuseppe Sarti, Giuseppe Gallignani, Vincenzo Cimatti, Guido Guerrini, etc.). From 2013 to 2025, he organised the annual music festivals La domenica ai Concordi, the Primavera Kammermusik concerts and a chamber music festival of the Conservatories of Music of Veneto. He is the coordinator of the doctoral course entitled Persecuted Music and Musical Heritage. In the field of musicology, he has conducted studies on the figure of Lamberto Caffarelli (1880-1963), organising an international conference and concerts in Faenza, Bologna, Rovereto, Dornach and Prague, and has published a manual on flute literature. During the Covid-19 pandemic, he organised online academic courses in ensemble music, conducting an extensive reflection on distance education and subsequently presenting the results in a volume. He curated a musical project on Giacomo Matteotti, proposed and approved by the Presidency of the Council of Ministers in 2023.

He has coordinated meetings and concerts on behalf of the Italian Society of Contemporary Music. He has supervised over sixty academic theses as a supervisor. More recently, he has organised concerts and study activities on military internees and music, and on music in relation to fascism, held at historical sites of fascist civilian internment camps in Italy (Campagna, Salerno), cultural and concert centres in Italy and Europe (Venice, Bologna, Ferrara, Milan, Warsaw) and launched a series of performance studies in collaboration with the Universal publisher in Vienna, working on an ongoing basis with the Fondazione Centro di Documentazione Ebraica Contemporanea (CDEC) in Milan.

== Bibliography ==
- Giuseppe Fagnocchi (et al.): Il dolore e la morte nelle espressioni artistiche figurative e musicali contemporanee, Padova, Il Poligrafo, 2010
- Giuseppe Fagnocchi (a cura di): Lamberto Caffarelli, poeta pensatore musicista faentino, Faenza, Mobydick, 2013 ISBN 978-88-8178-508-7
- Giuseppe Fagnocchi (a cura di): Sonore pietre e vive. Il Conservatorio Statale di Musica Francesco Venezze di Rovigo, Adria, Apogeo, 2019
- Giuseppe Fagnocchi, Lineamenti di storia della letteratura flautistica con sommario di storia dello strumento, 2. ed., Faenza, Mobydick, 2005, ISBN 88-8178-103-4
- Giuseppe Fagnocchi, Kammermusik. Prove per una didattica a distanza di repertori cameristici in epoca COVID, Adria, Apogeo, 2021, ISBN 978-88-99479-81-7
- Società Italiana di Musica Contemporanea, Giuseppe Fagnocchi (a cura di): Interpretazione e didattica musicale in Italia dal Novecento ai nostri giorni : manifestazioni del Centenario : 23-24 marzo 2023 Conservatorio di Rovigo, Rovigo, Conservatorio, 2023
- Paradiso, Claudio. Rivista Italiana Di Musicologia, vol. 38, no. 1, 2003, pp. 183–87. JSTOR, http://www.jstor.org/stable/24323876. Accessed 26 July 2025.
- Pfeiffer, Roland. “Faenza, 24. Oktober 2002: Internationaler Studientag „Intorno a Giuseppe Sarti“.” Die Musikforschung, vol. 56, no. 1, 2003, pp. 62–63. JSTOR, http://www.jstor.org/stable/41124114. Accessed 26 July 2025.
- Lamberto Caffarelli, Giuseppe Fagnocchi: Canto dei tre misteri. Galeotus, Faenza, Fratelli Lega, 2013 ISBN 978-88-7594-107-9
- Giuseppe Fagnocchi (a cura di) (2025). Primo incontro del Dottorato di ricerca Musica perseguitata e Patrimoni musicali. XL ciclo a.a. 2024-2025 Conservatorio di Rovigo. Rovigo: Conservatorio di Rovigo. ISBN 979-12-210-9525-8.
