= Kurt Sonnenfeld (composer) =

Austrian musician and composer

Kurt Sonnenfeld (Vienna, 24 February 1921 – Milan, 22 March 1997) was an Austrian Jewish musician and composer. During World War II, he was interned in Fascist camps established in Italy under the regime of Benito Mussolini.

== Life ==
=== Early life ===
Kurt Sonnenfeld was born in Vienna on 24 February 1921, during the city's peak of cultural, artistic, and musical prominence. From an early age, his musical talent was recognized by his father, Leopold Sonnenfeld, a prominent Jewish actor-musician active in Vienna at the turn of the 20th century. He began formal musical studies at the Vienna Conservatory and later trained under renowned Viennese operetta composer Edmund Eysler (1874–1949), studying piano, harmony, composition, and counterpoint.

==== Persecution and emigration ====
In July 1939, amid rising antisemitic persecution following the Anschluss, Sonnenfeld's parents sent him to Milan. They hoped to secure his eventual emigration to the United States through the legal mechanism of an affidavit, though these efforts proved unsuccessful.

=== Internment at Ferramonti ===
In February 1941, Kurt Sonnenfeld was arrested in Milan and imprisoned at San Vittore prison. Following Italy's entry into World War II in June 1940, Benito Mussolini's regime classified Jews, immigrants, and refugees as national security threats. Weeks later, Sonnenfeld endured a grueling train journey over 1,000 km (620 miles) from Milan to Calabria, where he was interned at the Ferramonti di Tarsia camp, near the village of Tarsia.

==== Cultural resilience in the camp ====
Despite systemic segregation, food shortages, and psychological strain, Ferramonti's Jewish prisoners—many of whom were accomplished professionals and intellectuals—organized cultural and educational activities to sustain morale. Sonnenfeld joined fellow musicians who had been prominent figures on European stages during the 1930s. Defying harsh conditions, they performed regularly, with Sonnenfeld documenting these efforts in a musical diary now held by the CDEC in Milan. He also continued his studies under conductors Lav Mirski and Isko Thaler.

==== Musical collaborations ====
A key figure in the camp was Croatian-Jewish composer and conductor Lav Mirski, who founded a choir aimed at fostering communal identity through music. Sonnenfeld participated as a chorister in a landmark concert on 9 February 1942, described in Arthur Lehmann's memoir Bilderbogen aus Ferramonti. The event, attended by local Fascist officials, underscored the prisoners' defiance through artistic expression.

==== Family tragedy and correspondence ====
Sonnenfeld's parents, Leopold Sonnenfeld and Therese Schwarz, were deported to the Maly Trostenets extermination camp in German-occupied Belarus, where they were murdered in June 1942. From March 1941 until April 1942, Sonnenfeld maintained a correspondence with them, preserved in 26 letters now housed in the Rari Archive of the Milan Conservatory.

=== Post-Ferramonti life and career ===
Following Ferramonti's liberation in September 1943, Sonnenfeld remained at the camp for an additional four years and eight months despite urging from his friend, physician Joseph Lax, to leave. He finally returned to Milan on 12 September 1945. Attempting to resume formal studies, he was denied admission to the Milan Conservatory by a commission comprising Riccardo Pick-Mangiagalli, Renzo Bossi, Ettore Desderi, and Giulio Cesare Paribeni, who cited his age as disqualifying.

Sonnenfeld settled permanently in Milan, teaching music privately and working as a piano accompanist for the dance school at Piccolo Teatro, a music instructor at La Rinascente, and later as a teacher at Milan's Jewish School. He continued composing until his death on 22 March 1997 and was buried in the Cimitero Maggiore in Milan.

==== Legacy and archival work ====
Sonnenfeld rarely spoke of his wartime trauma, though his life and artistry remained inextricably tied to Vienna and Ferramonti. He left over 200 autograph musical manuscripts, including the Ferramonti-Walzer, a rare example of a Lagerlied (camp song) tolerated—and occasionally encouraged—by Fascist authorities.

In 2024, the Conservatory of Rovigo launched a digital archive housing digitized materials from Sonnenfeld's estate, including scores, photographs, and manuscripts. That same year, the conservatory partnered with Universal Edition in Vienna to publish his works and those of other interned musicians in the series Musica internata.

== Selected works ==
Kurt Sonnenfeld composed over 300 works, most of which remain unpublished. A selection of his compositions includes:

- Puppentanz, polka (1935)
- Sonnenschein und ein Mägdelein (Sunshine and a Maiden), foxtrot (1936)
- Ferramonti-Walzer (Ferramonti Waltz) (1941)
- Sonata per violoncello e pianoforte (Sonata for Cello and Piano) (1950)
- Quartetto Liliput per archi (Lilliput Quartet for Strings) (1953)
- La città ignota (The Unknown City), vocal poem (1962)
- Milan by Night, symphonic rhapsody for timpani and piano (1972)
- Funkenspiel (Spark Play) for orchestra (1972)
- Radio-spielen (Radio Plays) for voice and piano (1974)
- Liberty Concert for piano and orchestra (1975)
- Ramage, sonata for violin and piano (1980)
- Credo for bass, five-part choir, organ, two cellos, double bass, and timpani (1988)
- Rainbow Concert for piano and orchestra (1995)

== Bibliography ==
- Capogreco, Carlo Spartaco. Ferramonti. La vita e gli uomini del più grande campo d'internamento fascista (1940–1945). Florence: La Giuntina, 1987.
- Deluca, Raffaele. Tradotti agli estremi confini: Musicisti ebrei internati nell'Italia fascista. Milan: Mimesis Edizioni, 2019. ISBN 9788857561226
- Deluca, Raffaele. "Musik und Musiker im italienischen Lager Ferramonti." Musica reanimata: Zeitschrift Mr. Mitteilungen, no. 91 (December 2016): pp. 7–17.
- Deluca, Raffaele. "Wir treffen uns am Schluss (We Shall Meet at the End): Kurt Sonnenfeld (1921–1997) at Ferramonti: The Persecution, the Exile, the Internment, the Music." In Italian Jewish Musicians and Composers under Fascism: Let Our Music Be Played, edited by Annalisa Capristo and Antonio Carrieri, pp. 151–167. New York: Palgrave Macmillan, 2021.
