= Conservatorio Giuseppe Verdi =

The Conservatorio Giuseppe Verdi or Giuseppe Verdi Conservatory may refer to:

- Milan Conservatory
- Turin Conservatory
- Como Conservatory
