= Stefano Grondona =

Italian musician (born 1958)

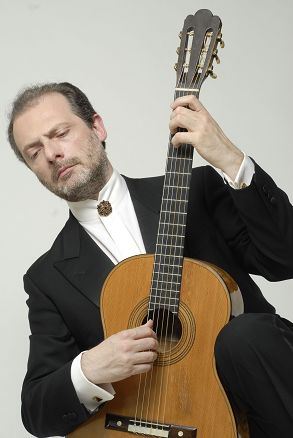
Stefano Grondona

Stefano Grondona (born in 1958) is an Italian classical guitarist. In 2002, he formed the guitar ensemble Nova Lira Orfeo XXI, which was based on Lira Orfeo, a Barcelona music society of which Miguel Llobet was the founder and director.

He has collaborated with Luca Waldner in writing the book La Chitarra di Liuteria - Masterpieces of Guitar Making.

He is Professor of Guitar at the State Conservatory of Vicenza, Veneto, Italy.

== Recordings ==
- Sor, Fernando 20 Studi per Chitarra (Ed. Ricordi Book+CD played by S.Grondona)
- Bach, Giuliani, Turina, Ponce (C.G.D. Classica cls91042)
- Bach, Henze, Petrassi (Dynamic CDS059)
- Novecento (Josè, Martin, Krenek, Morricone, Tansman) (1995, Phoenix 98419)
- La Guitarra de Torres (Llobet, Tárrega) (1996/7, Divox CDX-29701)
- Evocación (Albéniz & Granados) (2000, Stradivarius STR 33658)
- Lo Cant dels Aucells (2000, Stradivarius 33589)
- Baroque Images (Froberger, Bach, Scarlatti) (2001, Stradivarius STR 33622)
- Arcas Julián (2004, Stradivarius 33692)
- Homenaje (2006, Stradivarius STR 33660)
- Respuesta (2006, Stradivarius STR 33770)
- Humoresque Llobet & Anido in the 1920s (2007, Stradivarius STR 33815)
- Grondona plays Asturias (2009, Stradivarius STR 33832)

== Video ==
Ruggero Chiesa, Guitar Gradus (Grondona plays Sor & Walton) (Suvini-Zerboni ESZ.10224)
