= Conservatorio Vincenzo Bellini =

Conservatorio Vincenzo Bellini or Vincenzo Bellini Conservatory may refer to:

- A former name of the Palermo Conservatory
- The current name of the Catania Conservatory
- Istituto Superiore di Studi Musicali Vincenzo Bellini in Caltanissetta, Sicily
