= Biancamaria Furgeri =

Italian composer

Biancamaria Furgeri (born 6 October 1935) is an Italian organist, music educator and composer.

== Life ==
Biancamaria Fugeri was born in Rovigo, Italy, and studied at the Conservatorio di Padova and in Milan and Venice with Wolfgango Dalla Vecchia, Bruno Coltro, Bruno Bettinelli, Giuseppe Piccioli and Giorgio Federico Ghedini.

After completing her studies, Furgeri taught music in Ferrara and Padua, and in 1969 took a teaching position at the Conservatorio G.B. Martini in Bologna. Her works have been performed internationally. She has placed first in a number of international competitions, including the 1973 National Sacred Music competition in Verese, the 1985 GEDOK competition in Mannheim, and the 1987 International Competition for Women Composers in Zürich. She was director (1977-1979) of the Conservatory of Music in Rovigo.

== Works ==
Fugeri composes mostly orchestral, choral, chamber and vocal works. Selected compositions include:

- 1958 Sonata, Opus 1
- 1960 Piano Suite, Op 2
- 1963 Sonata, Opus 3 for organ
- 1965 Suite by Gioconda, Opus 4
- 1968 Toccata and Ricercare, Opus 5 for organ
- 1970-71 Piccoli Musici (Volume 1), Op 6
- 1970-71 Piccoli Musici (Volume 2), Opus 7
- 1972 Il libro dei Ritmi e dei Suoni, Opus 8
- 1973 Fair, Opus 9
- 1974 Discanto, Opus 10 for chorus
- 1975 Antifonie, Opus 12 for orchestra
- 1975 Consonance, Opus 13 for chamber ensemble
- 1975 Voci del tempo, Opus 11 for chorus
- 1977 Canzone del Pastore / Cavallino bianco e nero - luvenilia, op 15 for chorus
- 1977 Il Fuggitivo, Opus 14 for chorus
- 1980 Juvenilia, Opus 16 for piano
- 1981 Duplum, Op 17 for duo
- 1983 Cantico, op. 20 for chamber ensemble
- 1983 Moods, op 18 for orchestra
- 1983 Pars mea Dominus, op 19
- 1985 Là dove autunni e primavere, Opus 23 for chorus
- 1985 Ritorno, Opus 22 for chorus
- 1985 Tre episodic, Opus 24 for string quartet
- 1986 Opposizioni, Opus 26 for duo
- 1986 Otto piccoli pezzi per Ilaria, Op 25 for piano
- 1987 Levia, Opus 27 for orchestra
- 1989 Il canto Sognato, Op 29 for chamber ensemble
- 1989 Intarsi (Antichi modi di Canto), Opus 28 for orchestra
- 1990 A due gioco per quattro, Opus 35 for chamber ensemble
- 1990 Story, Op.36
