= List of music conservatories in Italy =

Below is an alphabetical list, by city, of music conservatories in Italy. Where a Wikipedia article does not yet exist, an external link is provided.

== A-L ==
- Adria – Conservatorio di Musica "Antonio Buzzolla"
- Alessandria – Conservatorio di Musica "Antonio Vivaldi"
- Avellino – Conservatorio di Musica "Domenico Cimarosa"
- Bari – Conservatorio di Musica "Niccolò Piccinni"
- Benevento – Conservatorio Statale di Musica "Nicola Sala"
- Bergamo – Conservatorio Gaetano Donizetti
- Bologna – Conservatorio Giovanni Battista Martini
- Bolzano – Conservatorio di Musica "Claudio Monteverdi"
- Brescia – Conservatorio di Musica "Luca Marenzio"
- Cagliari – Conservatorio Statale di Musica "Giovanni Pierluigi da Palestrina"
- Campobasso – Conservatorio di Musica "Lorenzo Perosi"
- Castelfranco Veneto – Conservatorio Statale di Musica "Agostino Steffani"
- Catania – Conservatorio "Vincenzo Bellini"
- Cesena – Conservatorio Statale di Musica "Bruno Maderna"
- Como – Conservatorio di Musica "Giuseppe Verdi"
- Cosenza – Conservatorio di Musica "Stanislao Giacomantonio"
- Cuneo – Conservatorio "Giorgio Federico Ghedini"
- Darfo – Conservatorio di Musica "Luca Marenzio"
- Fermo – Conservatorio Statale di Musica "Giovanni Battista Pergolesi"
- Ferrara – Conservatorio Statale di Musica "Girolamo Frescobaldi"
- Florence – Conservatorio Luigi Cherubini
- Foggia – Conservatorio di Musica "Umberto Giordano"
- Frosinone – Conservatorio "Licinio Refice"
- Genoa – Conservatorio "Niccolò Paganini"
- L'Aquila – Conservatorio "Alfredo Casella"
- La Spezia – Conservatorio "Giacomo Puccini"
- Latina – Conservatorio "Ottorino Respighi"
- Lecce – Conservatorio "Tito Schipa"

== M–Z ==
- Mantua – Conservatorio di Musica "Lucio Campiani"
- Matera – Conservatorio Statale di Musica "Egidio Romualdo Duni"
- Messina – Conservatorio Statale di Musica "Arcangelo Corelli"
- Milan – Conservatorio di Musica "Giuseppe Verdi"
- Monopoli – Conservatorio "Nino Rota"
- Naples – Conservatorio di Musica San Pietro a Majella
- Novara – Conservatorio "Guido Cantelli"
- Padua – Conservatorio Statale di Musica "Cesare Pollini"
- Palermo – Conservatorio di Musica "Alessandro Scarlatti" (formerly Conservatorio di Musica "Vincenzo Bellini)
- Parma – Conservatorio di Musica "Arrigo Boito"
- Perugia – Conservatorio di Musica "Francesco Morlacchi"
- Pesaro – Conservatorio Statale di Musica "Gioachino Rossini"
- Pescara – Conservatorio "Luisa D'Annunzio"
- Piacenza – Conservatorio Statale di Musica Giuseppe Nicolini
- Potenza – Conservatorio "Carlo Gesualdo"
- Reggio Calabria – Conservatorio "Francesco Cilea"
- Rome – Accademia Nazionale di Santa Cecilia
- Rovigo – Conservatorio Statale di Musica Francesco Venezze
- Salerno – Conservatorio "Giuseppe Martucci"
- Sassari – Conservatorio "Luigi Canepa"
- Trapani – Conservatorio "Antonio Scontrino"
- Trento – Conservatorio di Musica "Francesco Antonio Bonporti"
- Trieste – Conservatorio di Musica "Giuseppe Tartini"
- Turin – Conservatorio Statale di Musica "Giuseppe Verdi"
- Udine – Conservatorio "Jacopo Tomadini"
- Venice – Conservatorio di Musica "Benedetto Marcello"
- Verona – Conservatorio "Evaristo Felice Dall'Abaco"
- Vibo Valentia – Conservatorio "Fausto Torrefranca"
- Vicenza – Conservatory of Vicenza Conservatorio di Musica "Arrigo Pedrollo"

== Other music schools ==
Additionally, these are "higher music schools", termed pareggiate in Italian, meaning "equal". That is, they issue diplomas which carry the same weight as a conservatory diploma:

- Aosta
- Catania
- Livorno
- Lucca
- Pavia
- Reggio Emilia
- Ribera
- Rimini
- Siena
- Taranto
- Teramo
