= Lav Mirski =

Croatian conductor (1893–1968)

- Mirski during public meeting in Slavonia.
- Born: 21 June 1893; Zagreb, Austro-Hungarian Empire, (now Croatia)
- Died: 29 April 1968 (aged 74); Osijek, SFR Yugoslavia, (now Croatia)
- Education: University of Zagreb
- Occupation: Conductor

Lav Mirski (born Leo Fritz; 21 June 1893 – 29 April 1968) was a Croatian-Jewish conductor.

Mirski was born in Zagreb to a Jewish family. He completed his cello studies at the conservatory of University of Zagreb. In 1913, Mirski moved to Vienna, where he worked until 1917 when he returned to Croatia, Osijek. Mirski participated in the founding of the "Society for the advancement of science and arts" in Osijek, which in 1921 became the "City music school" and "Municipal conservatory". Since coming to Osijek, Mirski advocated the establishment of a permanent philharmonic, which he succeeded in 1924. With Mirski at head, Osijek philharmonic performed the most complex pieces of domestic and foreign composers. In 1923 Mirski became the director of the opera at the Croatian National Theatre in Osijek. At that time, among other things, Mirski recognized the potential of a young tambura player Julije Njikoš - Đule, then still a boy, who would later become the founder of the important Croatian tambura institutions. Mirski also worked in other Croatian cities, mostly in his hometown Zagreb, where he collaborated with the Croatian National Theatre, but also in Dubrovnik, Sušak and Rijeka. He also worked in Budapest, Prague and many other European cities.

In April 1941, with the NDH regime in power, Mirski was fired from the Croatian National Theatre in Osijek. At first he was deported to Zagreb, and then he was taken to the camp Ferramonti di Tarsia in Italy. In camp, Mirski led inmates choir. In 1944, Mirski was liberated after the capitulation of Italy and joined the Partisans. Later in Bari, Mirski conducted the symphony orchestras for the allied forces. In 1944 he moved to Mandatory Palestine. From 1944 to 1947, Mirski was opera, symphony and radio orchestra conductor in Tel Aviv and Jerusalem. In 1947, Mirski returned to Osijek to become, again, the director of the opera at the Croatian National Theatre. In 1956, Mirski became intendant at the Croatian National Theatre in Osijek. Mirski retired in 1961.

Mirski died in Osijek on 29 April 1968 and was buried at the Saint Ana Cemetery, with other Osijek's prominent citizens. In Mirski honour, square in Osijek is named after him. In 2007, city government renewed the Lav Mirski burial site.

== Bibliography ==
- Kraus, Ognjen (1998). Dva stoljeća povijesti i kulture Židova u Zagrebu i Hrvatskoj. Zagreb: Židovska općina Zagreb. ISBN 953-96836-2-9.
- Mihalek, Dušan (2009). Odjeci Hrvatske glazbene kulture u Izraelu.
- Romano, Jaša (1980). Jevreji Jugoslavije 1941–1945: žrtve genocida i učesnici narodnooslobodilačkog rata. Beograd: Jevrejski Istorijski Muzej, Saveza jevrejskih opština Jugoslavije.
- Živaković-Kerže, Zlata (2005). Židovi u Osijeku (1918.-1941.). Osijek: Židovska općina Osijek – Tiskara Pauk d.o.o., Cerna. ISBN 953-6659-22-0.
