= Centro di Documentazione Ebraica Contemporanea =

Coordinates: 45°28′36.20″N 9°10′00.90″E

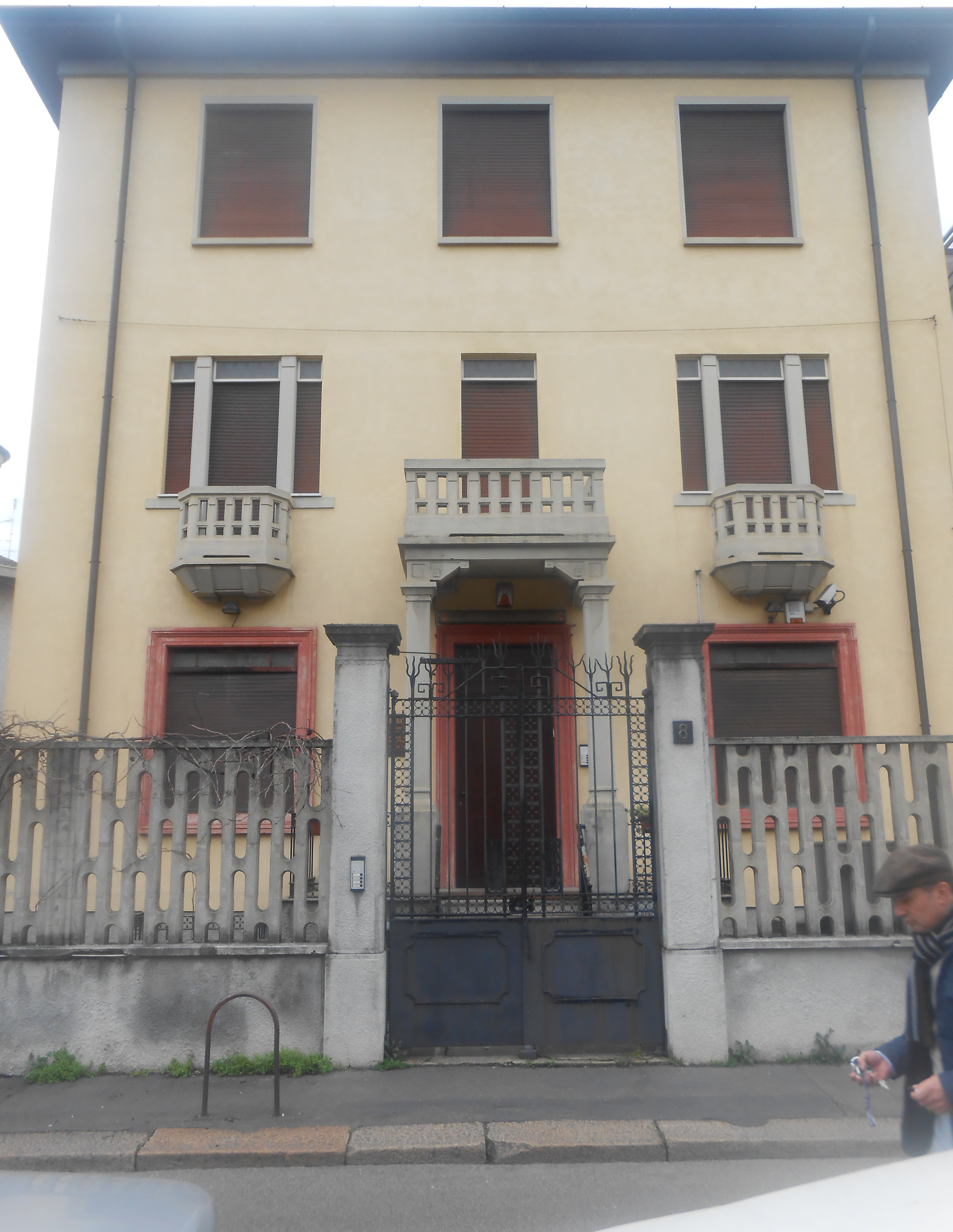
Centro di Documentazione Ebraica Contemporanea

The Centro di Documentazione Ebraica Contemporanea (Center of Contemporary Jewish Documentation; CDEC) is an independent cultural and historical institution in Milan, Italy. It promotes the study, culture, and history of the Jewish People in Italy in the context of modern times.

The CDEC was founded in 1955 at the initiative of the Italian Jewish Youth Federation (Federazione Giovanile Ebraica Italiana). The center researches and documents antisemitic persecution in Italy, as well as Jewish contributions to the Resistance in Italy. (per the CDEC charter, 1957)

Since 1986, the Center operates as a not-for-profit Foundation, under the name La Fondazione Centro di Documentazione Ebraica Contemporanea — CDEC. Michele Sarfatti has served as the Foundation's director during the years 2002–2016.

== Activities ==
=== Departments ===
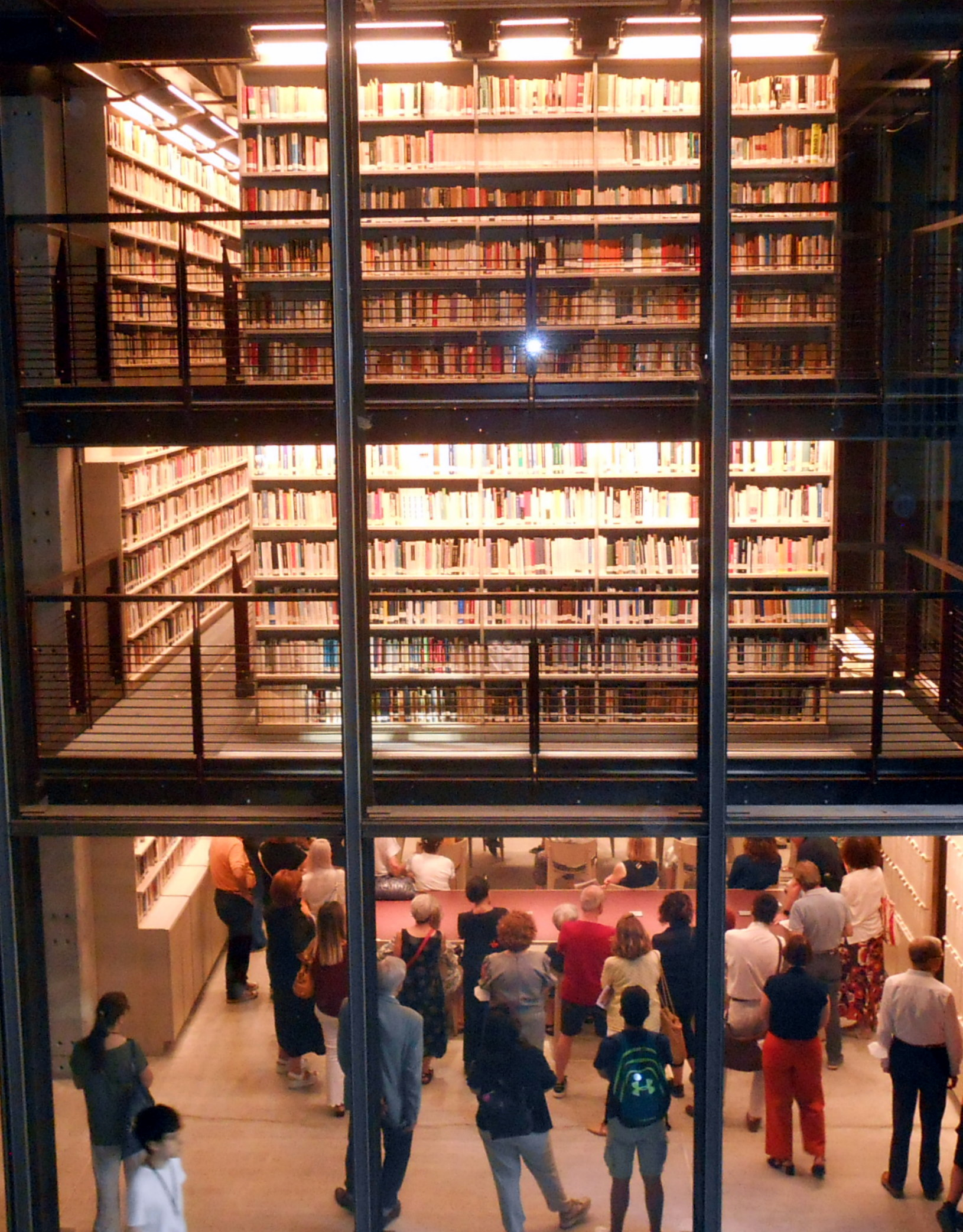
15 June 2022 inauguration of the new "History and Memory Centre", including the CDEC and the Shoah Memorial

The Center functions as a study and research facility. It curates exhibitions and organizes encounters between students and teachers. Its operations are divided between the following departments:

- Library
- Media center
- Historical archive
- Archive of Prejudice
- Teaching the Holocaust

=== Digital exhibition ===
In late 2006, the CDEC inaugurated its website offering a digital exhibition of its holdings. Thousands of items, comprising photographs, letters, journals, memoirs, and official documents, tell the story of Jewish life in Italy from the mid-19th century to the years of persecution at the start of the Second World War, through the Holocaust, and into the postwar period. The site, presently in Italian, is due to be translated into English.

=== Righteous Among the Nations ===
The CDEC Foundation represents Italy in the recognition of the "Righteous Among the Nations."

=== Collaborations with other institutions ===
The CDEC operates in collaboration with Holocaust documentation institutions worldwide, including:

- Yad Vashem in Jerusalem
- The Austrian Holocaust Memorial Service
