= Rovigo Conservatory of Music =

Music conservatory in Rovigo, Italy

- Conservatorio Statale di Musica 'Francesco Venezze'
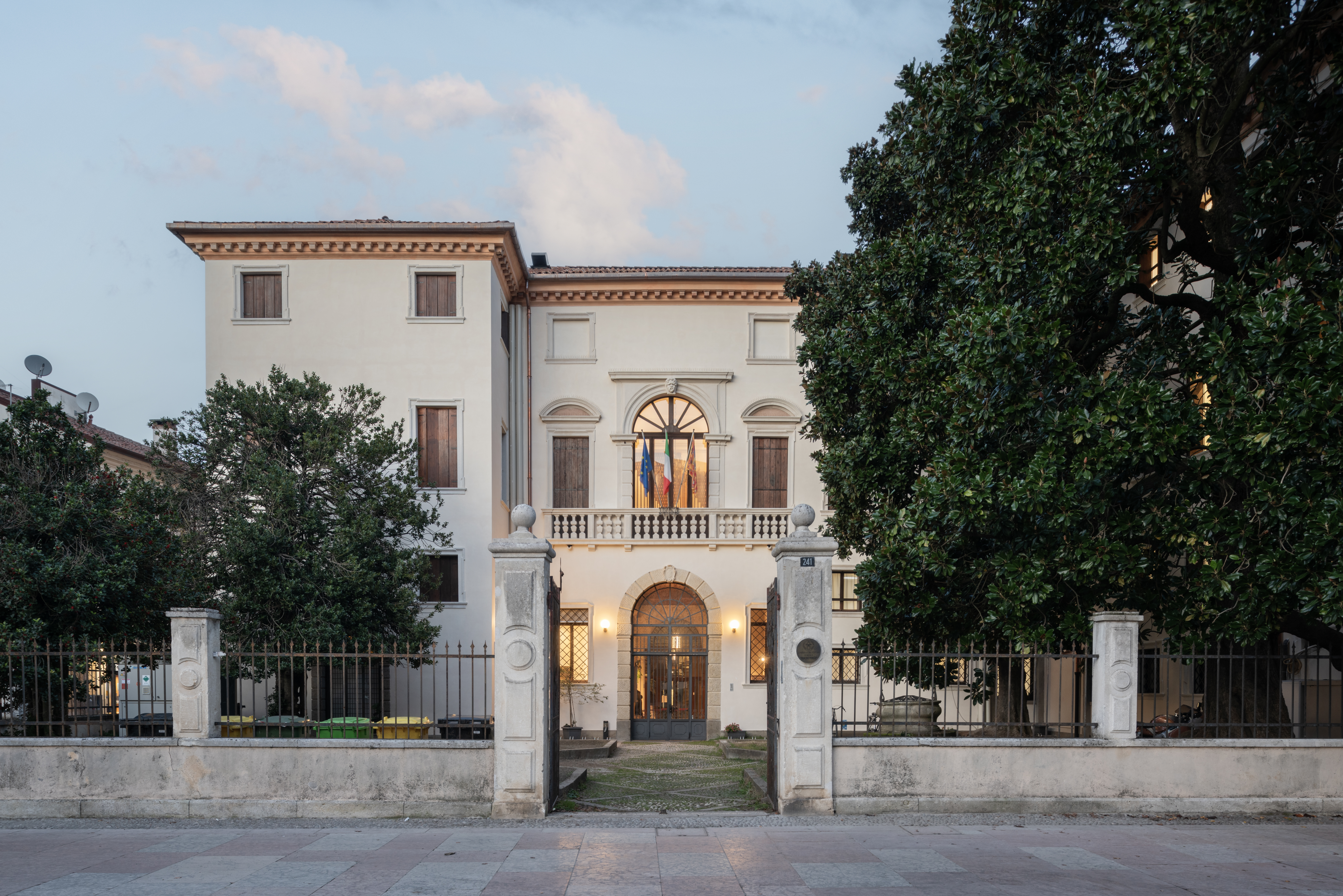
- Type: Public
- Established: 1970; 56 years ago
- Director: Vincenzo Soravia
- Students: 745
- Location: Rovigo, Veneto, Italy; 45°04′11″N 11°47′29″E
- Website: www.conservatoriorovigo.it

The 'Francesco Venezze' State Conservatory of Music is an Italian higher institute of music studies based in Rovigo.

== History ==
The origins of the institution date back to 1970, when Riccardo Misasi, then Minister of Education, sent a telegram to the mayor of Rovigo, instructing the establishment of a branch of the Verona Conservatory in the provincial capital of Polesine. Làszlò Spezzaferri (1912–1989) was tasked with evaluating the suitability of the venue, which was located in the city center at the eighteenth-century Palazzo Venezze. The official decree recognizing the Rovigo Conservatory was signed in May 1975 by Italian President Giovanni Leone. Before that date, Rovigo's twentieth-century music education was carried out by a Philharmonic Society, later transformed into the Civico liceo musicale (1922), led in those early years by Marino Cremesini (1890-1973). Centuries earlier, the city already had a private singing school (1595), the musical chapel of the Duomo (1664), the Campagnella (1694) and Manfredini (1698) theatres and the Teatro Sociale (1819). Unlike most Italian conservatories of music, which are named after renowned musicians, the Rovigo Conservatory is dedicated to Francesco Antonio Venezze (1792–1864), a prominent member of the Venezze family. This distinction honors his generous donation of the entire architectural complex, which today serves as the headquarters for the institution's academic and administrative activities.

=== Rovigo and music ===
The character of the city of Rovigo is evoked in Antonio Vivaldi's Cantata RV 688 entitled Le gare del dovere (1708). Adriano Banchieri's Pazzia senile (1598) is set in Rovigo. According to a popular legend, Claudio Monteverdi supposedly composed the Cantata Il rosaio fiorito (1629) for the birth of the son of Vito Morosini, podestà and captain of Rovigo. The city of Rovigo was also the birthplace of notable musicians, including polyphonist Antonio Burlini (1577-1623), Carlo Filago (1589-1644), Lorenzo Barbirolli (1798-1867) and composer Francesco Malipiero (1824-1887). Also from the province of Rovigo (Polesine) were Attilio Barion, the publisher who dared to "challenge" Ricordi in libretto printing, the composer Stefano Gobatti and the pianist and composer Nicolò Celega (1846-1906). Also sensitive to the musical life of his time was the anti-fascist Polesine martyr Giacomo Matteotti. Proof of this can be found in the historical pianos in his birth house in Fratta Polesine, in the musical testimonies documented in many letters sent to his wife Velia Titta, and in the fraternal friendship with his brother-in-law, the famous baritone Titta Ruffo. The violinist Giuseppe Torelli (1658-1709) also came from a family in Rovigo.

=== Historic venues and concert halls ===
In addition to Palazzo Venezze, the conservatory has three further decentralised city venues. The first is located in the Church of Sant'Agostino (1588), an example of Ferrara architecture in Rovigo. The second, in the former Bishop's Palace (1608), is home to the Venezze Secondary School, which has an agreement with the conservatory, and to numerous theoretical-analytical and compositional teaching activities as well as the wind, jazz and pop-rock departments. Finally, 2009 saw the opening of the 'Marco Tamburini' Auditorium, the venue for numerous lectures, conferences and concerts, as well as the conservatory's main hall. A three-keyboard Mascioni mechanical organ is located in the concert hall of Palazzo Venezze. The conservatory has four grand concert pianos (two Steinway & Sons, one Yamaha and one Bösendorfer).

=== Students and alumni ===
As of 31 October 2024, there were 745 students enrolled. The origin of the students is local, interregional and international. Among the latter, a good percentage come from the People's Republic of China. In addition to teaching, production and research activities, enrolled students are offered the opportunity to participate in concert, chamber music, choral and theatre productions throughout the Province and the Veneto Region. As of 2019, 1726 students had graduated from th Rovigo Conservatory.

== Infrastructure ==
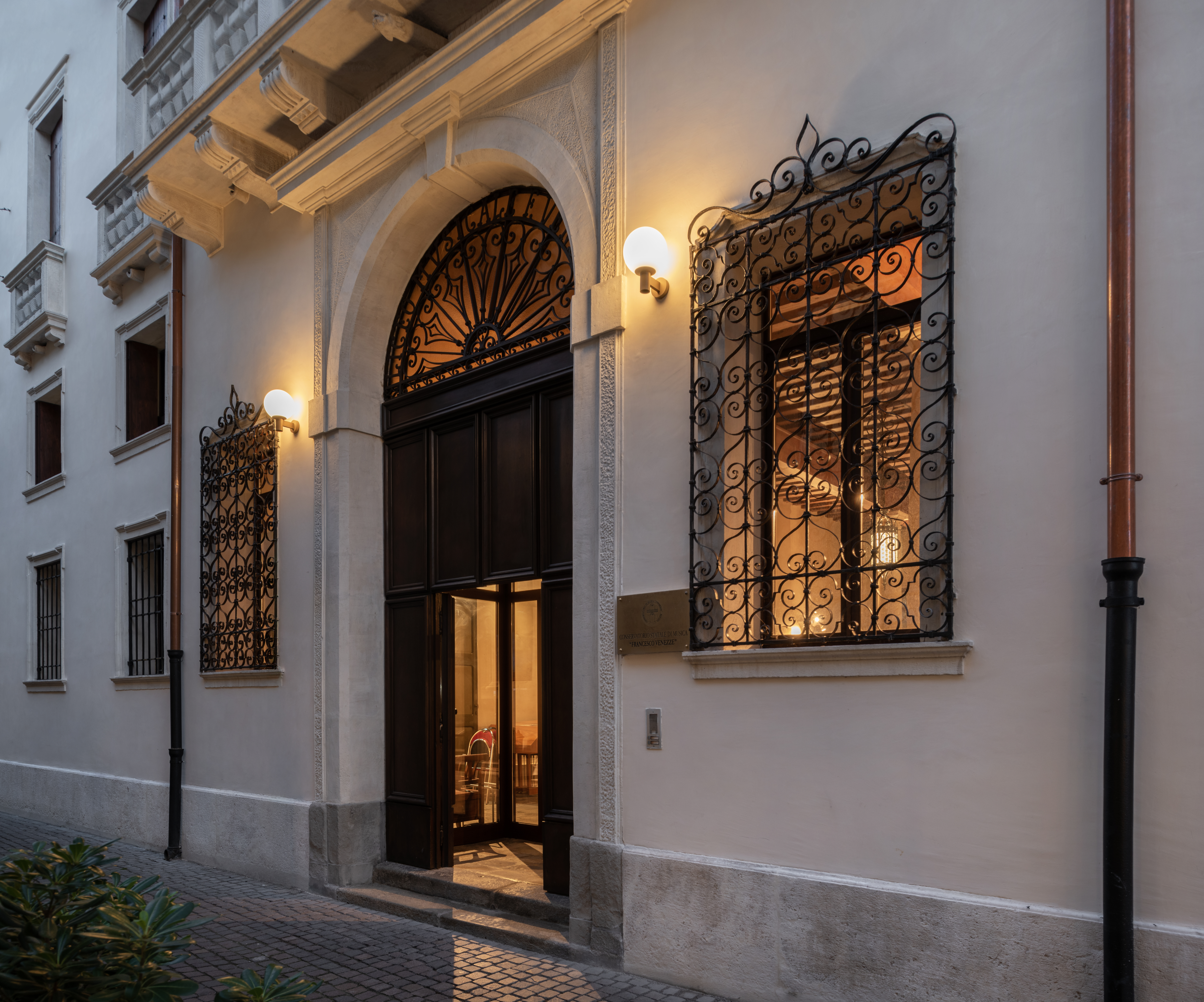
Exterior view of the Rovigo Conservatory Library

The Rovigo Conservatory Library serves as a key research infrastructure, housing over 30,000 bibliographic units, all accessible through the national SBN OPAC. Since 2024, a Digital Library has been operational, supported by a dedicated digitization laboratory located within the Library. At present, it already has over two thousand freely searchable digital objects (manuscript and printed music, autograph letters, ancient and historical music literature). The Library holds important historical music collections such as the archive of the Polesine conductor Fernando Previtali (1907-1985) and the personal library of the Austrian Jewish composer Kurt Sonnenfeld (1921-1997) who was interned in Italian fascist camps during World War II. Additionally, the Library boasts a noteworthy collection of piano rolls, some recorded between 1920 and 1929 by renowned pianists such as Lev Pouishnoff, Józef Hofmann, Ignaz Friedman, Arthur Rubinstein. In 2024, two special sections of the Library were established. The first, named Porta Orientalis, comprises hundreds of texts on musicological literature in Chinese. The second, titled Persecuted Music, features an equally extensive collection of international specialist literature focusing on music and musicians persecuted under authoritarian regimes.

=== Department of Electronic Music ===
The Church of St. Augustine, built in 1588 by the hermit fathers of the Monte Ortone Congregation (Abano), is a functional example of the reuse of disused ecclesiastical property. It is home to the lessons of the didactic courses in Electronic Music and Composition for Music Applied to Images and, thanks to the important park of digital and electronic instruments that is continually being enriched, it is also suitable as an audio-video recording venue.

== Research and musical activities ==
=== PhDs ===
By Decree No. 470 issued on February 21, 2024, by the Ministry of Universities and Research,music conservatories were, for the first time, granted the opportunity to offer accredited PhD programs. At the Rovigo Conservatory, two PhD courses were established as part of Cycle XL, titled Italian Piano Music and Persecuted Music and Musical Heritage. Additionally, a third PhD program was created in collaboration with the Conservatorio di Vicenza, under the associated title Art and Cultural Heritage as Practical Research Tools for International Research Projects. For the doctoral program Persecuted Music, the conservatory collaborates with the music publisher Universal Edition of Vienna on a specific project dedicated to interned music.

=== Musical activities ===
Events, festivals and reviews of the various departments specifically characterise the Conservatorio Venezze. The concert workshop "Musica e Pittura – Musica e Poesia" (Music and Painting – Music and Poetry) has been active since 1996, with public events open to the city of Rovigo, currently produced by the students under the coordination of the teachers of Ensemble Music. The concerts held in the years 1996–2024 involved 515 students and 181 teachers of the conservatory. Since 2016, the National Marco Tamburini Prize Competition has been held in honour of the trumpet player who died prematurely as an annual fulfilment of the jazz department's concert activities, and the extensive and diversified "Venezze Wind Orchestra Project" has been active since the last decade. During the COVID-19 pandemic, the conservatory organised a series of online lectures that later resulted in the publication of a volume edited by lecturers and students. Since 2022 the Paolo Ambroso National Guitar Competition has been held, while since 2023 the Pop Rock Festival, the Dialoghi composition festival and the Rovigo Piano Festival, the latter characterised by monographic proposals mainly dedicated to Italian music, have been active through masterclasses, meetings with renowned musicians and concerts held by teachers and students.

== Pipe organs ==
The conservatory's study organ was built in 1981 by the Mascioni company of Azzio (VA) and placed in a hall of the Palazzo Venezze. It is an extension organ, with a base of 73 bordone pipes (from 8‘) and 61 main pipes (from 4’). The monumental hall of Palazzo Venezze houses the concert organ, also built in 1983 by the Mascioni company (opus 1064). The instrument has mechanical transmission, three keyboards and a concave-radial pedalboard with 32 notes.

I - Manuale Positivo
Flauto camino	8'
Corno camoscio	4' (Flauto in ottava)
Piccolo	8'
Cembalo II	8'
Cromorno	8'

II - Grand'Organo
Principale	8'
Ottava	4'
Decimaquinta	2'
Decimanona	1' 1/3
Vigesimaseconda	1' 2/3
Due di Ripieno	2/3 - 1/2
Flauto	8'
Sesquialtera	2' 2/3 - 1' 3/5
Tromba	8'

III - Recitativo Espressivo
Principale	8'
Ripieno 5 file	2'
Flauto armonico	8'
Flauto traverso	8'
Flauto ottavante	4'
Nazardo	2' 2/3
Ottavino	2'
Terza	1' 3/5
Fagotto	16'
Oboe	8'
Voce umana	8'
Tremolo

Pedale
Principale tappato	16'
Principale	8'
Bordone	8'
Corno Camoscio	4'
Flauto	2'
Controfagotto	16'
Fagotto	4'

- The organ is completed by all keyboard and pedal combinations, six programmable electronic combinations, Crescendo and Expression pedals.

== Organisation ==
=== Departments ===
The conservatory is organised into the following departments:

- Singing
- Didactics
- Jazz
- Pop-Rock
- Electronic music and composition for music applied to images
- String and string instruments
- Wind instruments
- Keyboards and percussion instruments
- Theory and analysis; composition and conducting
- Early Music
- Musicology
- Ensemble music

=== Conservatory directors ===
- Làszlò Spezzaferri (1970-1974, direttore del Conservatorio di Verona)
- Riccardo Castagnone (1974-1976, direttore del Conservatorio di Parma)
- Gian Franco Piva (1976-1977)
- Biancamaria Furgeri (1977-1979)
- Angelo Bellisario (1978-1979)
- Domenico Serantoni (1979-1980)
- Valeria Baruchello Laganà (1980-1981; 1983-1996)
- Efrem Casagrande (1981-1982)
- Luigi Andrea Gigante (1982-1983)
- Massimo Contiero (1996-2004)
- Luca Paccagnella (2004-2010)
- Vincenzo Soravia (2010-2016; 2021-2024)
- Giuseppe Fagnocchi (2016-2019)

== Bibliography ==
- Fagnocchi, Giuseppe (2025). Primo incontro del Dottorato di ricerca Musica perseguitata e Patrimoni musicali. XL ciclo a.a. 2024-2025. Rovigo: Conservatorio di Rovigo. ISBN 979-12-210-9525-8.
- Bruscagin, Beatrice (2024). Non resterà un evento episodico. Musica e Pittura Musica e Poesia dal 1996 al 2023. Rovigo: Duepunti. p. 186. ISBN 979-12-210694-8-8.
- Fagnocchi, Giuseppe (2019). Sonore pietre e vive. Il Conservatorio di Musica Francesco Venezze di Rovigo. Rovigo: Apogeo. p. 221. ISBN 978-88-99479-55-8.
- Fagnocchi, Giuseppe (2021). Kammermusik. Prove per una didattica a distanza di repertori cameristici in epoca COVID. Rovigo: Apogeo. p. 283. ISBN 978-88-99479-81-7.
- Garbato, Sergio (2007). L'associazione musicale Francesco Venezze. 85 anni di musica e storia. Rovigo: Accademia dei Concordi. p. 255. ISBN 978-88-902722-0-2.
