= Conservatory of Vicenza =

Music institution in Italy

Coordinates: 45.55052°N 11.55427°E

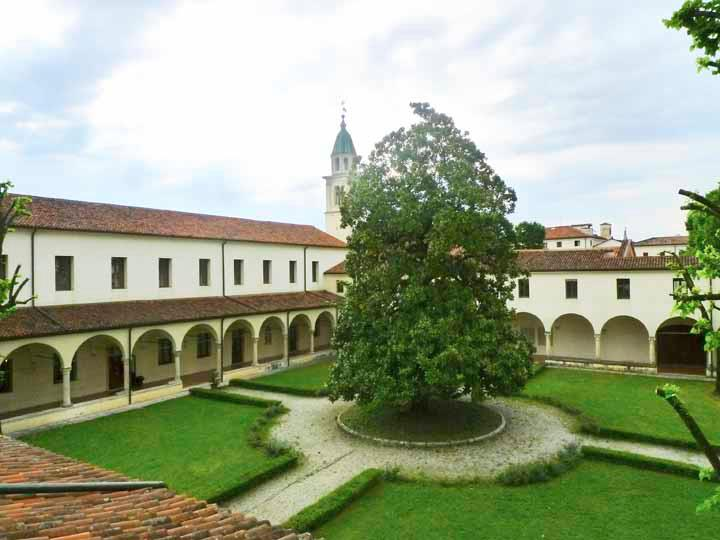
The Conservatory "Arrigo Pedrollo" of Vicenza

The Conservatory "Arrigo Pedrollo" of Vicenza, Italy, is a tertiary music institution. It is located in Vicenza, within the grounds of the San Domenico convent.

== History ==
Founded in 1867, the conservatory of Vicenza originally began as the Music Institute "Francesco Canneti". In 1969 it was converted to a state conservatoire, initially as a branch of the Venice Conservatory. It subsequently became autonomous in 1979, and was named after the Vicenzan composer Arrigo Pedrollo. In the following years, it distinguished itself for pioneering experimental subjects, such as early music and Indian Music. Today, the institution has a staff of approx. 100 teachers for ca. 700 registered students. Notable activities organised by the conservatoire include four concert series, master classes, seminars and conferences. Its symphonic orchestra, choir and numerous other ensembles perform regularly in hundreds of concerts every year. Additionally, the conservatoire fosters research activities, coordinated by the institution itself.

=== Directors ===
- Fiorella Benetti Brazzale
- Gastone Zotto
- Giovanni Guglielmo
- Gastone Zotto
- Enrico Anselmi
- Pierluigi Destro
- Paolo Troncon
- Enrico Pisa
- Roberto Antonello

== Collaborations with other institutions ==
The conservatory of music "Arrigo Pedrollo" is a founding member of the Federation of Conservatories in the Veneto Region. In 2003, it established a collaboration with the Institute "Magnificat" in Jerusalem, which in 2012 was sanctioned by the relevant government department. As a result, diplomas obtained in the Magnificat Institute are considered to be of equal value to those obtained in the Vicenza conservatoire; a unique facility of this conservatoire in Italy. An affiliation with the university of music in Xuzhou, China, was set up in 2013. This framework arrangement enables the exchange of students between the two institutions. Furthermore, the Vicenza conservatory collaborates with 41 private and public music schools in Italy, from Trentino to Puglia.

== Location ==
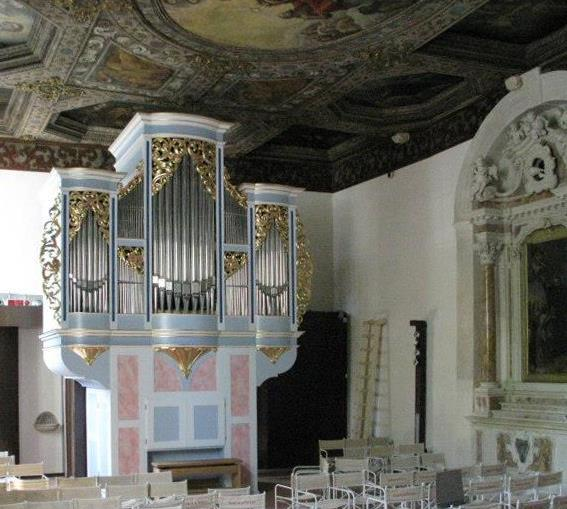
Conservatory of Vicenza, Auditorium San Domenico

The conservatory is located within the grounds of the San Domenico convent (13th century). It was renovated in 1998, and now offers many facilities in a self-enclosed modern structure, in which teaching activities and music performances take place throughout the academic year. The conservatoire boasts approx. 60 classrooms, a concert hall (200 seats) named after the singer Marcella Pobbe, a rehearsal hall, and an Auditorium within the small church of San Domenico (restored in 2010). The Auditorium "Canneti" (308 seats) is located in a nearby historical building and available to students of the conservatoire. Both auditoria are equipped with organs: in the church of San Domenico, the organ was built in 2010 by Andrea Zeni from Tesero (Trento) and was modelled on designs by Gottfried Silbermann. The one in the Auditorium “Canneti” is a large instrument with a mechanical action (2,535 pipes, 34 registers, three keyboards of 61 keys, a pedal board of 32 keys), and was built in 1989 by the company “V. Mascioni" from Curio (Varese).

== Courses of study ==
=== Courses ===
- Bachelor of Music (First-level academic courses)
- Master of Music (Second-level academic courses)
- Former curricular courses
- Pre-academic courses
- Open courses

=== Departments ===
- Early music
- Extra-European music (Indian music)
- Modern music technology and languages (jazz, electronic music)
- Singing, musical theatre
- Woodwind instruments
- Keyboard and percussion instruments
- String instruments
- Chamber and ensemble music
- Theory, analysis, composition and conducting
- 20th century and contemporary music
- Pedagogical studies
- Historical studies and musicology

=== Subjects ===
- Accordion
- Bansuri (Indian flute)
- Bassoon
- Baroque bassoon
- Chamber music
- Vocal chamber music
- Choir Direction
- Choral Training
- Clarinet
- Early clarinet
- Composition
- Cornetto
- Double bass
- Jazz double bass
- Drums
- Electro-acoustic music
- Electronic music
- Ensemble music for woodwind
- Flute
- Transverse flute
- Recorder
- Gregorian chant
- Guitar
- Harmony
- Harp
- Renaissance and baroque harp
- Harpsichord and historical keyboards
- Horn
- Natural horn
- Indian dance: Kathak, Bharatanatyam
- Indian singing
- Jazz
- Lute
- Music history
- Oboe
- Baroque and classical oboe
- Orchestral Training
- Organ
- Historical organ
- Pianoforte
- Piano Accompaniment
- Early pianoforte (fortepiano)
- Jazz pianoforte
- Percussion instruments
- Poetic and dramatic literature
- String quartet
- Sarod
- Saxophone
- Score-reading
- Stagecraft
- Singing
- Renaissance and Baroque singing
- Sitar
- Tabla
- Theory, solfege
- Trumpet
- Renaissance and baroque trumpet
- Trombone
- Renaissance and baroque trombone (sackbut)
- 'Ud (Arabic lute)
- Viola
- Viola da gamba
- Violin
- Baroque violin
- Violoncello
- Baroque violoncello
- Violone
- Violin Suzuki method
- Cello Suzuki method
- Double bass Suzuki method
- Piano Suzuki method

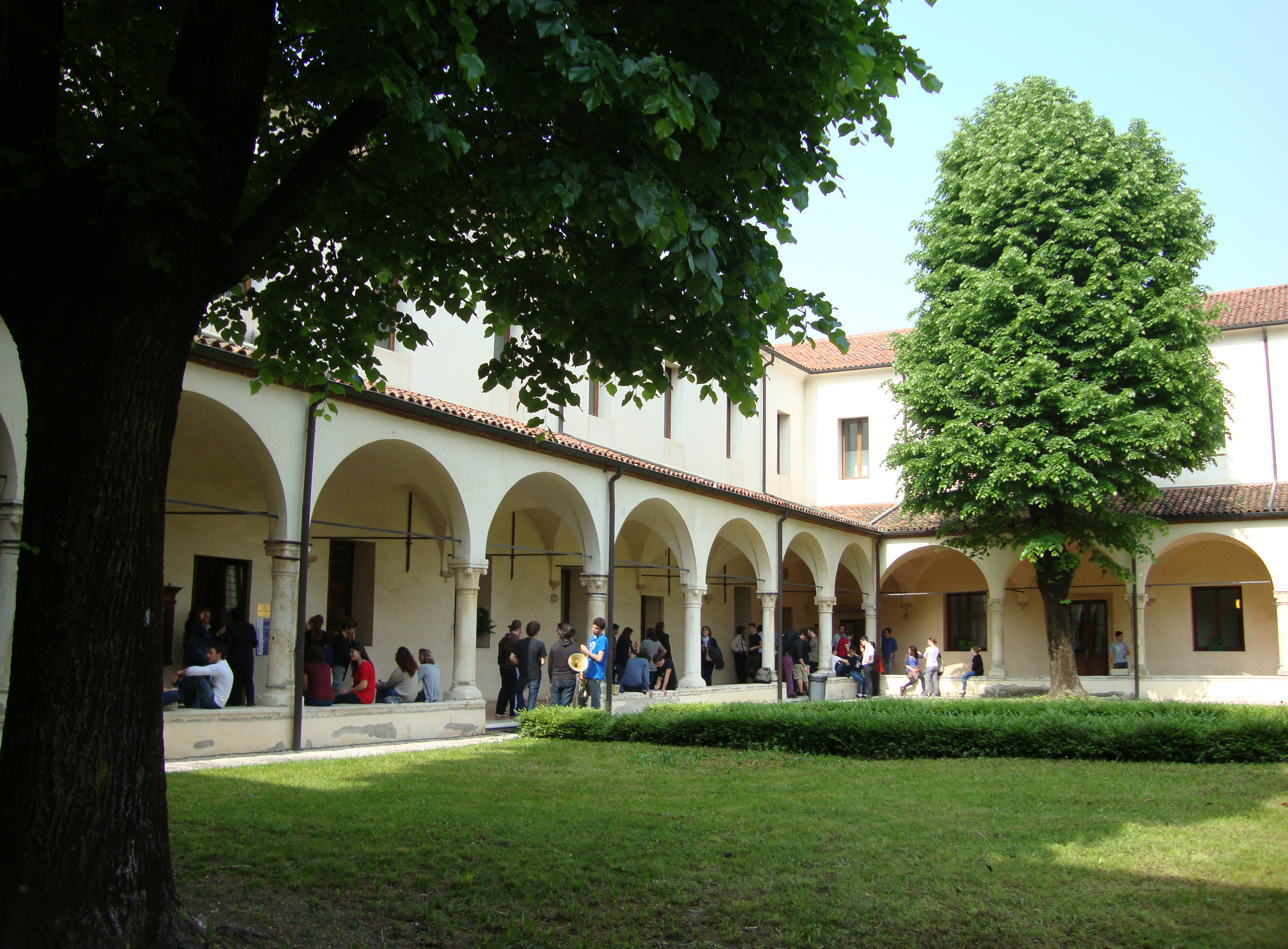
Conservatory of Vicenza, cloister

== Concert series ==
- "Martedì al conservatorio" – concert season given by the association "Friends of the Vicenza Conservatoire”
- "Fiori musicali" – concert series featuring early music, in collaboration with the Civic Library 'Bertoliana' of Vicenza
- "Dopo il rumore" – concert series featuring music from the 20th and 21st century.
- "Incontri coll'opera" – cycle of conferences and concerts.
- "I sabati musicali”

== Library ==
The library of the conservatoire boasts a heritage of approx. 30,000 documents, deriving partly from the Philharmonic Institute "Canneti", and partly from the conservatoire's recent acquisitions, which are regularly expanding. Repertoire and reference works, thematic catalogues, collections of musical scores, and other recently published material are available in the library, as are books of musicology, theory, music pedagogy, organology, facsimile editions of musical treatises, and Italian and international magazines.

The musical section offers an ample choice of repertoire ranging from critical editions of scores, performing scores, and methods and teaching aids for instrumental practice. The collection of audio files has also been recently expanded thanks to the generous donation of Luciano Maggi's family. Of significance are the contributions of Maria Gabriella Marchi, Enrico Balboni, Romana Righetti, Saverio Cavaliere, Natalino Tacchetti, and Maria Giovanna Miggiani. The library provides to students and staff of the conservatoire as well as to external users, the following services free-of-charge: browsing and reading on-site, listening to audio files, loaning of books and materials, online search of library catalogues, and staff assistance. The documents of the “Canneti” collection and of the conservatoire have been catalogued as part of Veneto Region library framework, Servizio Bibliotecario Nazionale; the main catalogue of the library is hosted in OPAC.
