= List of compositions by Luigi Nono =

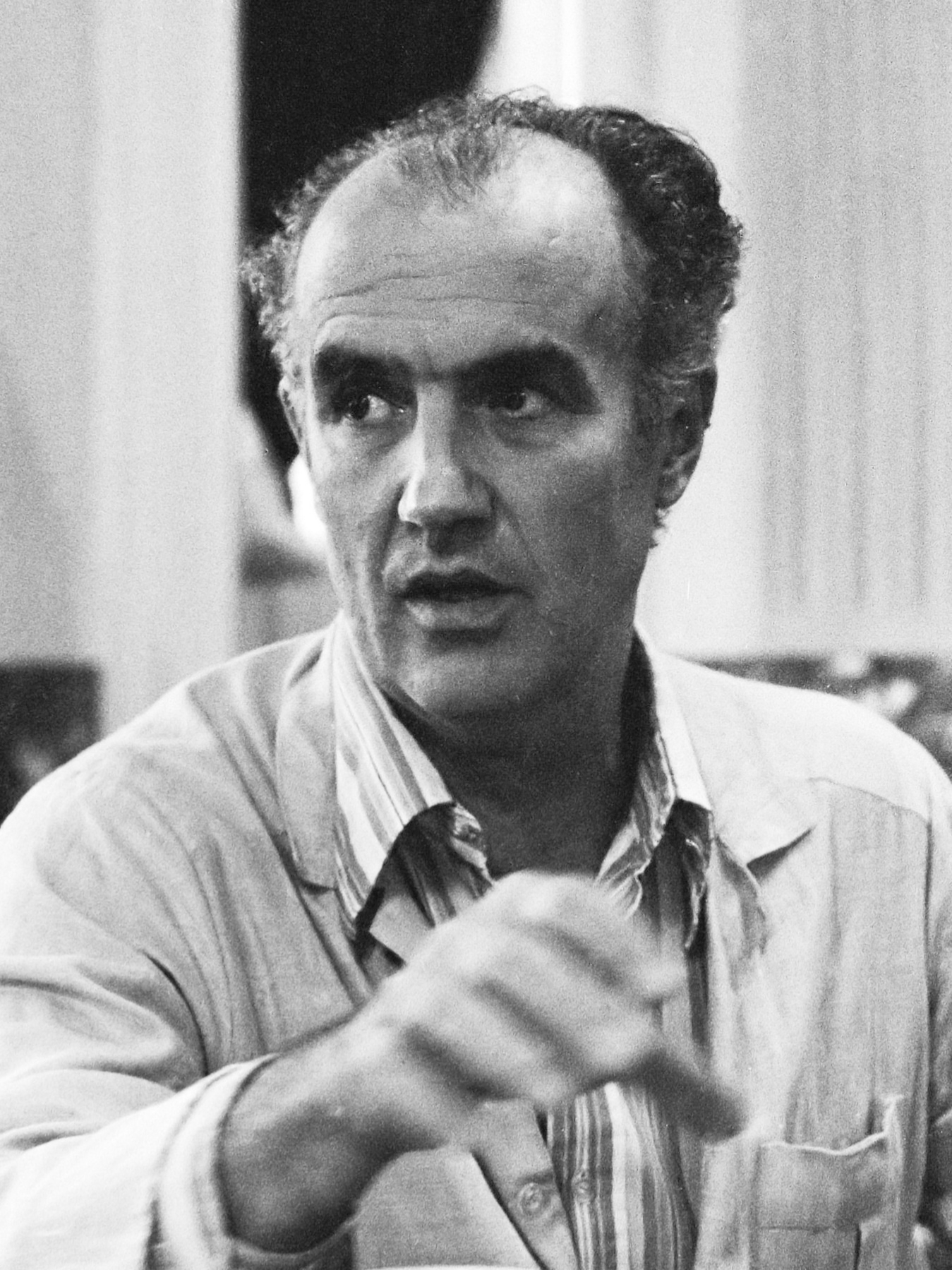
Luigi Nono in 1979

The following is a list of compositions by Luigi Nono. Source:

== Compositions ==
All works are sorted chronologically:

- Due liriche greche, for mixed chorus and instrumental ensemble (1948)
- Variazioni canoniche sulla serie dell’op. 41 di Arnold Schoenberg (1950)
- Polifonica – Monodia – Ritmica, for ensemble (1951)
- Julius Fučík, for two narrators and orchestra (1951)
- Epitaffio per Federico García Lorca No. 1, "España en el corazón", for soprano, baritone, chorus and ensemble (1951)
- Composizione per orchestra No. 1, for orchestra (1951)
- Epitaffio per Federico García Lorca No. 2, "Y su sangre ya viene cantando", for flute and small orchestra (1952)
- Due espressioni, for orchestra (1953)
- Epitaffio per Federico García Lorca No. 3, "Memento – Romance de la Guardia Civil Española", for narrator, chorus and orchestra (1953)
- Liebeslied, for mixed chorus and ensemble (1954)
- Was ihr wollt (1954)
- Der rote Mantel (1954)
- La victoire de Guernica, for mixed chorus and orchestra (1954)
- Canti per 13 (1955)
- Incontri, for 24 musicians (1955)
- Der rote Mantel Suite No. 1 (1955)
- Der rote Mantel Suite No. 2 (1955)
- Il canto sospeso, for soprano, alto, tenor, mixed chorus and orchestra (1956)
- Varianti, for solo violin, string instruments and woodwind (1957)
- La terra e la compagna, for soprano, tenor, chorus and ensemble (1957)
- Cori di Didone (1958)
- Piccola gala notturna veneziana in onore dei 60 anni di Heinrich Strobel, for piano, celesta, vibraphone, bells and strings (1958)
- Composizione per orchestra No. 2: Diario polacco ’58, for orchestra and percussion ensemble (1959)
- Omaggio a Emilio Vedova, for tape (1960)
- "Ha venido". Canciones para Silvia, for soprano and chorus of six sopranos (1960)
- Sarà dolce tacere, for eight soloists (1960)
- Intolleranza 1960, azione scenica (1961)
- Canti di vita e d’amore: I. Sul ponte di Hiroshima – II. Djamila Boupachà – III. Tu, for soprano, tenor and orchestra (1962)
- Canciones a Guiomar, for solo soprano and ensemble (1963)
- La fabbrica illuminata, for female voice and tape (1964)
- Da un diario italiano, for 72 voices (1964)
- Die Ermittlung, for tape (1965)
- A floresta é jovem e cheja de vida, for soprano, three voices, clarinet, percussion and tape (1966)
- Ricorda cosa ti hanno fatto in Auschwitz, for tape (1966)
- Per Bastiana – Tai-Yang Cheng, for tape and three instrumental ensembles (1967)
- Contrappunto dialettico alla mente, for tape (1968)
- Intolleranza 1960 Suite, for soprano, tape and orchestra (1969)
- Musiche per Manzù, for tape (1969)
- Musica-Manifesto n. 1: Un volto, del mare – Non consumiamo Marx, for soprano, voice and tape (1969)
- San Vittore 1969 (1969)
- Voci destroying muros (1970)
- Y entonces comprendió (1970)
- Ein Gespenst geht um in der Welt, for soprano, chorus and orchestra (1971)
- Como una ola de fuerza y luz, for soprano, piano, orchestra and tape (1972)
- Siamo la gioventù del Vietnam, for one-part chorus (1973)
- Für Paul Dessau, for tape (1974)
- Al gran sole carico d’amore, azione scenica for soloists, small and large chorus, orchestra and tape (1975)
- I turcs tal Friúl (1976)
- ... sofferte onde serene ..., for piano and tape (1976)
- Al gran sole carico d’amore (Fragments), for soloists, chorus, orchestra and tape (1978)
- Con Luigi Dallapiccola, for percussion and live electronics (1979)
- Fragmente – Stille, An Diotima, for string quartet (1980)
- Das atmende Klarsein, for small chorus, bass flute, live electronics and tape (1981)
- Io, frammento dal Prometeo, for three sopranos, small chorus, bass flute, bass clarinet and live electronics (1981)
- ¿Donde estás hermano?, for four female voices (1982)
- Quando stanno morendo. Diario polacco No. 2, for four female voices, bass flute, cello and live electronics (1982)
- Guai ai gelidi mostri, for two altos, flute, clarinet, tuba, viola, cello, double bass and live electronics (1983)
- Omaggio a György Kurtág, for alto, flute, clarinet, bass tuba and live electronics (1983)
- Prometeo. Tragedia dell’ascolto, for vocal and instrumental soloists, mixed chorus, four instrumental ensembles and live electronics (1984)
- A Carlo Scarpa, architetto, ai suoi infiniti possibili, for orchestra in microintervals (1984)
- A Pierre. Dell’azzurro silenzio, inquietum, for bass flute, bass clarinet and live electronics (1985)
- Risonanze erranti. Liederzyklus a Massimo Cacciari, for mezzo-soprano, flute, tuba, six percussionists and live electronics (1986)
- 1° Caminantes…..Ayacucho, for alto, flute, small and large chorus, organ, orchestra and live electronics (1987)
- 2° No hay caminos, hay que caminar.....Andrej Tarkowskij, for seven ensembles (1987)
- Post-prae-ludium No. 1 per Donau, for tuba and live electronics (1987)
- Découvrir la subversion. Hommage à Edmond Jabès, for alto, narrator, flute, tuba, French horn and live electronics (1987)
- Post-prae-ludium No. 3, “BAAB-ARR”, for piccolo and live electronics (1988)
- La lontananza nostalgica utopica futura. Madrigale per più “caminantes” con Gidon Kremer, for violin and eight tapes (1988)
- “Hay que caminar” soñando, for two violins (1989)
