= Hans Peter Haller =

German composer

Hans Peter Haller (26 October 1929 – 16 April 2006) was a German composer and pioneer of electroacoustic music.

== Life ==
Born in Radolfzell, Haller studied church music in Heidelberg from 1947 and took composition lessons with Wolfgang Fortner and René Leibowitz. From 1950, he worked as a recording manager and programme editor at Südwestfunk Baden-Baden. From 1954 to 1958, he studied musicology at the Albert-Ludwigs-Universität Freiburg with Wilibald Gurlitt.

After returning to the Sudwestfunk in 1959, he turned increasingly to electronic and Neue Musik. For the composition Mantra, a work commissioned by Karlheinz Stockhausen for Südwestfunk (1969), Haller built a sound transducer with the engineer Peter Lawo. In 1970, the head of the music department of Südwestfunk, Heinrich Strobel, awarded a double commission for an electroacoustic work to Cristóbal Halffter and Haller. The device designed by Haller for this purpose ("Hallers tolle Kiste 4") was the forerunner of the Halaphone, a "fully electronic sound control device for the movement of a sound source in a given space", manufactured by the Lawo company.

In 1972, Haller became director of the newly founded experimental studio of the Heinrich Strobel Foundation of Südwestfunk. Halffter's Planto por las Victimas de la Violencia, the first work with electronic spatial sound control, was premiered at the Donaueschinger Musiktage.

From the early 1980s onwards, the Experimental Studio produced Luigi Nono's entire late work, who compared Haller's importance for these compositions to that of Joseph Joachim for Brahms' Violin Concerto. In particular, the late major work Prometeo would not have been realisable in this form without Haller's collaboration. In addition to Nono, Haller also worked with composers such as Pierre Boulez (Répons), Kazimierz Serocki (Pianophonie), Brian Ferneyhough, (Time and Motion Study), Dieter Schnebel (Monotonies) and Emmanuel Nunes (Wandlungen) together.

In addition, Haller taught at the University of Freiburg and the University of Basel as well as at the Hochschule für Musik Freiburg from 1974 to 1990. At the end of 1989, Haller took early retirement to write a documentary about the Experimental Studio and the research into electronic sound transformation on behalf of the Heinrich Strobel Foundation. ("Das Experimentalstudio der Heinrich-Strobel-Stiftung des Südwestfunks Freiburg 1971–1989. Die Erforschung der Elektronischen Klangumformung und ihre Geschichte.", 2 volumes, Verlag Nomos, Baden-Baden 1995–96).

Haller died in Denzlingen at age 76.
