= Maurizio Pollini =

Italian pianist and conductor (1942–2024)

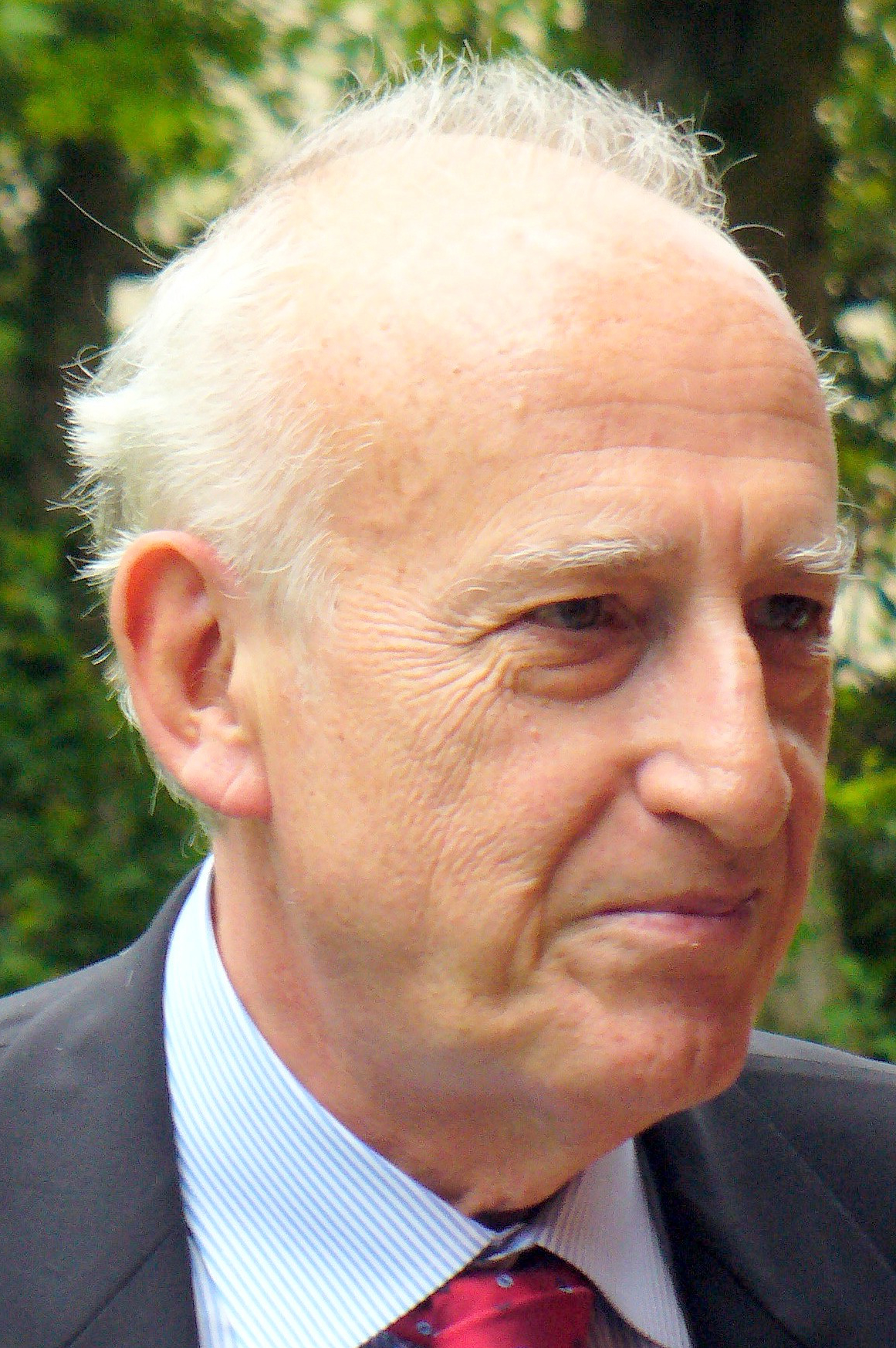
- Pollini in 2009
- Born: 5 January 1942; Milan, Italy
- Died: 23 March 2024 (aged 82); Milan, Italy
- Education: Milan Conservatory
- Occupations: Classical pianist; Conductor
- Awards: Ernst von Siemens Music Prize; Grammy Award; Gramophone Hall of Fame

Maurizio Pollini (5 January 1942 – 23 March 2024) was an Italian pianist and conductor. He was known for performances of Beethoven, Chopin, Debussy, and the Second Viennese School, among others. He championed works by contemporary composers, including Pierre Boulez, Karlheinz Stockhausen, George Benjamin, Roberto Carnevale, Gianluca Cascioli and Bruno Maderna. Several compositions were written for him, including Luigi Nono's ... sofferte onde serene ..., Giacomo Manzoni's Masse: omaggio a Edgard Varèse, and Salvatore Sciarrino's Fifth Sonata. As a conductor, he was instrumental in the Rossini revival at the Rossini Opera Festival in Pesaro, conducting La donna del lago from a new critical edition in 1981. He also conducted from the keyboard.

Pollini was also a left-wing activist in the 1960s and 1970s, and he remained politically engaged in later life. He maintained some separation between these ideals and his music.

== Life and career ==
=== 1942–early 1960s: Upbringing, studies, and competitions ===
Pollini was born in Milan in 1942. His father Gino Pollini was an amateur violinist. Gino was among the first architects of Gruppo 7 to bring modern architecture to Italy in the 1930s. His mother Renata Melotti had trained as a pianist and singer. She was a sister of the Italian sculptor Fausto Melotti.

Pollini studied piano with notable local teacher Carlo Lonati from age seven. Lonati allowed him to play what he loved, he remembered. When Lonati died, his student Carlo Vidusso became Pollini's next teacher. Pollini remained Vidusso's student from age 13 to 18. Vidusso trained Pollini strictly at the Milan Conservatory, preparing him to compete. Pollini also studied composition and conducting there.

He made his debut in Milan at the age of 15, performing a selection of Chopin's Etudes. In 1957 he took second prize, after Martha Argerich, in the Geneva International Music Competition at the Conservatoire de Musique de Genève. He won both the 1959 International Ettore Pozzoli Piano Competition in Seregno and the 1960 sixth International Chopin Piano Competition in Warsaw at the age of 18. He was the youngest of 89 entrants and the first non-Slav to win in the history of the competition. He selected among the most formidable of the possible etudes the Op. 10, No. 10, Op. 25, No. 11, and Op. 10, No. 1, which Piero Rattalino assessed as qualifying Pollini for "the madhouse or victory". Arthur Rubinstein, leading the jury, declared "that boy can play the piano better than any of us". (Note: Rubinstein referred here to Pollini's "technical powers".)

After these successes, Pollini did not perform for one year. He limited his concertizing in the 1960s to study, broadening his musical experience and expanding his pianistic repertoire. This led to erroneous rumors that he had become a recluse. He taped performances of Chopin's Etudes and recorded Chopin's First Concerto with the Philharmonia Orchestra under Paul Kletzki for EMI. He had a "crisis of confidence", as Peter Andry described it, when the Philharmonia offered him a concert series.

He studied with pianist Arturo Benedetti Michelangeli for six months in the early 1960s. Michelangeli's repertoire was select and polished by rigorous practice. (Note: Michelangeli was noted for his Debussy, Ravel, and Beethoven. His many students included Martha Argerich and Ivan Moravec. Harold C. Schonberg criticized him as "a modern pianist who tries to be Romantic.") Pollini obtained "a precise technique and emotional restraint". Some expressed concern that Michelangeli's influence led to Pollini's style becoming "mannered and cold" or "drier, more cerebral". While known for exceptional technique, Pollini was criticized for emotional conservatism. John Rockwell summarized Pollini's "hard‐edged and modern" style as one of "coolness, intensity and virtuosity", noting his tonal control and "sheer dexterity".

=== Mid-1960s–1970s: Early career and musical and political collaboration ===
There was ... tension in the air. ... remember the situation in Italy back then. People were ... talking about a possible Fascist coup. ... I ... tried to read a declaration ... when the United States bombed Hanoi and Hai Phong. Several Italian musicians had signed [it]: Claudio Abbado, Luigi Nono, Manzoni and the Quartetto Italiano, ... Goffredo Petrassi, and Luigi Dallapiccola. ... at the mere sound of the word 'Vietnam', the audience exploded in a kind of collective delirium, which made it impossible to continue my recital. I made several attempts to read this short statement. This was interrupted by the arrival of the police. Eventually, the piano was closed, and that was that.

— Maurizio Pollini on his experiences during the Years of Lead

Beginning in the mid-1960s, Pollini gave recitals and appeared with orchestras in Europe, the United States, and the Far East. His American debut was in 1968 at Carnegie Hall in New York. He first toured Japan in 1974. Once wary of becoming pigeonholed as a specialist, especially of Chopin, he had "clearly avoided that tag" by the 1970s, Rockwell noted while surveying Pollini's discography in its then range from Mozart to Nono. (Note: Later Pollini added Bach to his repertoire.)

Especially in the 1960s and 1970s, Pollini was active as a left-wing musician. His collaborative work with Claudio Abbado and Luigi Nono was informed by their shared ideals. He was also musically and politically associated with Giacomo Manzoni and Luigi Pestalozza. Pollini worked with Nono in such works as Como una ola de fuerza y luz (1972), which mourned the death of Luciano Cruz, a leader of the Revolutionary Left Movement in Chile. He performed with Abbado at La Scala in Milan in concerts for students and workers, aiming to build a public among them in the spirit that art should be for everybody. The two concertized for the Russell Tribunal. At least one of Pollini's recitals was concluded upon audience unrest and police intervention when he attempted to make a statement about the Vietnam War.

He was able to separate his politics from his musicianship, for example in his work with Karl Böhm.

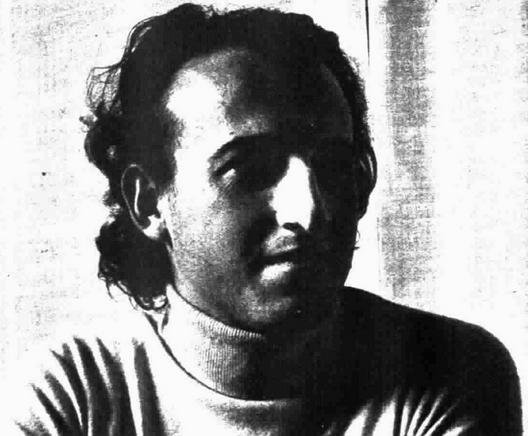
Pollini in 1975

Nono wrote ... sofferte onde serene ... for Pollini in 1974–1976. It was a meditative soloistic piece on recent losses among their family and friends. Pollini's 1977 live performance was amplified against a magnetic tape recording of himself. Nono thereby explored pianistic envelope ("Sometimes I cut off the attack, so that the sound manifests as a resonance without time") and the sounds of Venice (where "one constantly hears the sound of bells"). Nono cited an attraction to Pollini's technique in particular. He sought to amplify and project details of Pollini's sound ("certain nuances of his touch"). They worked together for three days in the recording studio at Radio Milano with audio engineer Marino Zuccheri. The work remained in Pollini's repertoire; he later played it in London at the Southbank Centre's "Fragments of Venice" festival (2007) and in Salzburg (2019).

Pollini took up Boulez's "weighty" Second Sonata in the 1970s. In 1977, he played Bartok's Second Concerto under Boulez with the New York Philharmonic. Harold C. Schonberg wrote that he "had not heard a stronger account".

=== 1980s–2024: Later career and conducting ===
Pollini also conducted when he played piano concertos such as Mozart's. He played a "defining role" in the Rossini Opera Festival at Pesaro, conducting La donna del lago from a new critical edition in 1981. The occasion was a "landmark" in the post-war Rossini revival. He was praised for his interpretive insights into Rossini's orchestration, motivic development, and harmony. But he was criticized for his inflexible literalism and quick tempi, which drove Martine Dupuy to tears. Scholars cited historical evidence and showed him autograph manuscripts to persuade him to allow more ornamentation and rubato, bel canto hallmarks, particularly in the elaborate fioritura of cadential passages. He relented only in the final rondò, "Tanti affetti in tal momento", for which Rossini prepared three ossia for particular singers. Pollini insisted that the singers adhere to these sources.

He tempered this approach somewhat in a 1983 reprise featuring Katia Ricciarelli (Elena), Lucia Valentini Terrani (Malcolm), and Samuel Ramey (Duglas) with the Chamber Orchestra of Europe, which Sony recorded. (Note: The recording is Sony S2K 39311.) For this production, his friend Gae Aulenti stage directed and designed the sets.

Among those celebrating Webern's 1983 birth centenary in New York and at the Venice Festival of Contemporary Music, Pollini played the Piano Variations. Celebrating J. S. Bach's 1985 tricentenary, he performed The Well-Tempered Clavier, Book I. He later recorded it in 2009.

In 1987, he received the Vienna Philharmonic's Honorary Ring while playing Beethoven's piano concertos with them in New York conducted by Abbado. In 1993–1994, he played his first complete Beethoven sonata cycle in Berlin and Munich. He continued this in New York City, at La Scala, in London, Paris and Vienna.

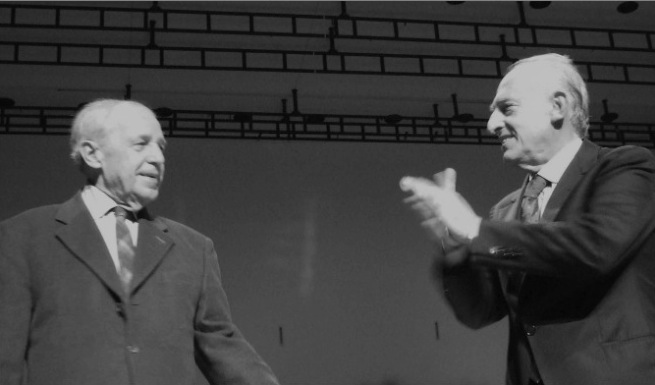
Pollini with Pierre Boulez in Paris (2009)

He juxtaposed old and new music at the 1995 Salzburg Festival in the "Progetto Pollini" concert series, at Carnegie Hall (2000–2001) in "Perspectives: Maurizio Pollini", and at London's Royal Festival Hall (2010–2011) in the "Project Pollini", a five-concert series ranging from Bach to Boulez and Stockhausen (with Schoenberg's Op. 19 as an encore). Throughout his career, Pollini championed less popular, often more recent works. He financed these projects with the prize money of the Ernst von Siemens Music Prize. On Mozart's 250th birth centenary at the 2006 Salzburg Festival, he changed the second half of the program to Webern's Piano Variations and Boulez's Second Sonata. Some among the audience left at intermission, after the Webern, or during the Boulez.

Pollini continued politically identifying with the left, although he later questioned some Italian leftists' tactics. In 2010, he spoke out against Silvio Berlusconi, concertizing in opposition to constitutional reforms. He offered low-cost, student tickets to his concerts.

In March 2012, Pollini cancelled his US appearances, citing his health. He toured Central Europe in 2014, performing at the Salzburg Festival and debuting at the Rheingau Musik Festival with Chopin's Preludes and Debussy's Preludes, Book I, in the Kurhaus Wiesbaden. In 2022, his 80th birthday recital received a four-star award in The Times.

== Private life ==
In 1968 Pollini married Maria Elisabetta Marzotto, known as Marilisa, a pianist from a Milanese family. Maurizio Pollini died on 23 March 2024, aged 82. His son Daniele Pollini is a pianist and a conductor.

== Recordings ==
Pollini's first recordings for Deutsche Grammophon (DG) in 1971 included Stravinsky's Trois mouvements de Petrouchka and Prokofiev's Seventh Sonata. They are considered landmarks of twentieth-century piano discography. He recorded Chopin's Etudes, Opp. 10 and 25 in 1972 and Schoenberg's solo piano œuvre in 1974 for the same label. In 2014, he recorded the entire Beethoven piano sonatas cycle. DG celebrated Pollini's 60th birthday (2002) with a 13-CD commemorative edition and his 75th (2017) with a complete 58-CD edition.

== Awards and recognition ==
In 1996, Pollini received the Ernst von Siemens Music Prize. In 2001, his recording of Beethoven's Diabelli Variations won the Diapason d'Or. In 2007, Pollini received the Grammy Award for Best Instrumental Soloist Performance (without orchestra) for his Deutsche Grammophon recording of Chopin's Nocturnes. He was awarded the Praemium Imperiale in 2010, and entered the Gramophone Hall of Fame in 2012.

== Cited sources ==
- Allen, David. 2024. "Maurizio Pollini, Celebrated Pianist Who Defined Modernism, Dies at 82". The New York Times (accessed 26 March 2024). (subscription required)
- Aulenti, Gae and Alain Elkann. 1996. "Gae Aulenti". Self-published on author's web page (accessed 23 March 2024).
- Berry, Mark. 2024. "R.I.P. Maurizio Pollini (1942–2024)". Self-published on author's web page (accessed 24 March 2024).
- Bonifazi, Chiara. 2016. Linda Bimbi: Une vie, beaucoup d'histoires, intro. Luciana Castellina, trans. Brune Seban. Rome: Fondazione Basso. From Linda Bimbi: una vita, tante storie, 2015, Turin: Gruppo Abele, ISBN 978-88-6579-101-1 (pbk).
- Canarina, John. 2010. The New York Philharmonic: From Bernstein to Maazel. Milwaukee: Hal Leonard. ISBN 978-1-57467-188-9 (hbk).
- Fontana, Carlo. 2023. Sarà l'avventura: Una vita per il teatro. Milan: il Saggiatore. ISBN 979-1-259-81174-5 (ebk).
- Gossett, Philip. 2006. Divas and Scholars: Performing Italian Opera. Chicago: University of Chicago Press. ISBN 978-0-226-30482-3 (cloth).
- Griffiths, Paul. 2010. Modern Music and After, 3rd ed. Oxford: Oxford University Press. ISBN 978-0-19-974050-5 (pbk). Rev. ed. of Modern Music: The Avant Garde Since 1945 (1981).
- Nono, Luigi. 2018. Nostalgia for the Future: Luigi Nono's Selected Writings and Interviews, eds. Angela Ida De Benedictis and Veniero Rizzardi, trans. John O'Donnell. Vol. 21, California Studies in 20th-Century Music Series, gen. ed. Richard Taruskin. Oakland: University of California Press. ISBN 978-0-520-29119-5 (cloth). ISBN 978-0-520-29120-1 (pbk).
- Sciannameo, Franco. 2020. Reflections on the Music of Ennio Morricone: Fame and Legacy. Lanham: Rowman & Littlefield. ISBN 978-1-4985-6900-2 (cloth). ISBN 978-1-4985-6901-9 (ebk).
- Siek, Stephen. 2017. A Dictionary for the Modern Pianist. Lanham: Rowman & Littlefield. ISBN 978-1-4985-6900-2 (cloth). ISBN 978-0-8108-8880-7 (ebk). ISBN 978-0-8108-8879-1 (hbk).
