= ... sofferte onde serene ... =

Composition for piano and tape by Luigi Nono

- by Luigi Nono
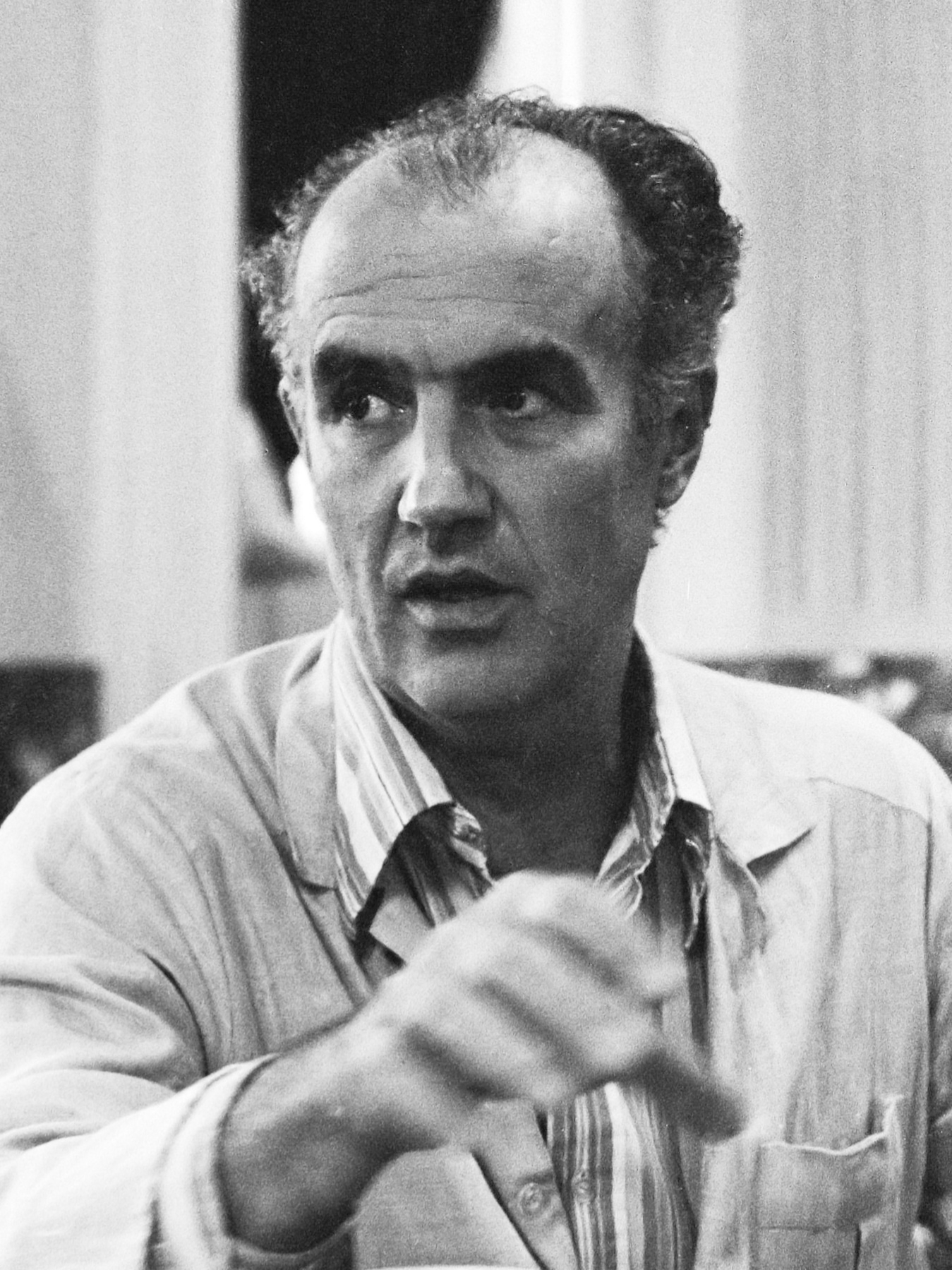
- Luigi Nono in 1979
- Catalogue: ALN 42
- Composed: 1976
- Published: Casa Ricordi
- Duration: 14 minutes
- Scoring: Piano and magnetic tape

Premiere
- Date: April 17, 1977
- Location: Sala Verdi, Milan Conservatory, Milan
- Performers: Luigi Nono, sound supervisor Maurizio Pollini, live and taped piano Marino Zuccheri, sound technician

... sofferte onde serene ... or ..... sofferte onde serene ... (Note: Nono's manuscript title is ..... sofferte onde serene .... The Archivio Luigi Nono refers to the work thus.) (Italian: "serene waves suffered" or "endured"), ALN 42, is a composition for piano and tape by Italian composer Luigi Nono. Borne of Nono's friendship and artistic collaboration with Maurizio Pollini, it was the first of Nono's works in what became his late style.

== Composition ==
Nono wrote ... sofferte one serene ... for his friend Maurizio Pollini after their 1971–1972 collaboration in Como una ola de fuerza y luz. Nono used the sounds of his native Venice, notably its bell towers, which he heard from across the Venetian Lagoon at home on Giudecca. He finished it there in 1976, dedicating it to Pollini and Pollini's wife Marilisa. Nono's music was affected by the "harsh wind of death", with recent losses including Bruno Maderna, Gian Francesco Malipiero, Nono's parents, and Marilisa's miscarriage.

Nono extended the piano's sonority, emphasizing its pedal resonances via tape. Pollini and sound technician Marino Zuccheri recorded this part at the Studio di fonologia musicale di Radio Milano.

Pollini (live and taped piano), Zuccheri (sound technician), and Nono (sound supervisor) gave the premiere at the Milan Conservatory's Sala Verdi on 17 April 1977.

After Al gran sole carico d'amore (1972 and 1975), which was inspired by women's revolutionary struggle, ... sofferte onde serene ... marked a final introspective shift within Nono's overtly leftist œuvre. In the premiere's program note, Nono quoted Kafka on the "equilibrium of the profound interior". Nono's music became slower and quieter, with pitches often occupying a high register or tessitura. He became more concerned with spatiality, especially "floating sounds", and moved toward the use of fragments and silences in subsequent works. Heinz-Klaus Metzger observed these changes as an "intensification of [Nono's] identity."

Casa Ricordi published the score (1977, 1992). Pianist and musicologist Paulo de Assis prepared a prototype critical edition at the Orpheus Institute (2009, unpublished).

== Structure ==
... sofferte onde serene ... is a fourteen-minute movement in 155 bars. Tempo markings are very strict and tempo variations based on performance are rare. The original tape recorded by Nono, still used in concert performances, has a thirteen-minute-and-thirty-nine-second duration. Nono used as many as eight reference numbers in the score to keep the piano and the tape synchronized:

1. 00:54 – Begin after three seconds
2. 01:56 – Begin after three seconds
3. 02:57 – Begin immediately
4. 05:11 – Begin immediately
5. 06:49 – Begin immediately
6. 09:16 – Begin immediately
7. 11:49 – Begin immediately
8. 13:14 – Begin after two seconds

... sofferte onde serene ... calls for on-stage piano, a mixer and a sound engineer meant to be placed off-stage, and four loudspeakers: two on the piano and two on the bottom-left and bottom-right corner of the stage. The piece starts with the piano at a tempo of = ca. 60. Nono marks further tempo changes in almost every bar. He composed the live and taped piano parts to blend in uniform textures, distinct from his previous violent and contrasting style.

== Recordings ==
The following is a list of notable performances of this composition:

Piano	Sound technician	Label	Year of recording
Maurizio Pollini	Marino Zuccheri	Deutsche Grammophon	1979
Aldo Orvieto	Alvise Vidolin	ARTIS Records	1993
Markus Hinterhäuser	André Richard	Col Legno	1994
Iris Gerber	—	Edition Bianchi-neri	1997
Sven Thomas Kiebler	André Richard	2e2	1997
Kenneth Karlsson	—	Albedo Music	2000
Stefan Litwin	—	Telos Music	2001
Pascale Berthelot	—	CNSMD	2003
Paulo de Assis	—	Orpheus Institute CD Series	2018
Jan Michiels	—	Kairos	2018
