= André Richard =

Swiss composer and conductor

André Richard (born 18 April 1944) is a Swiss composer and conductor.

== Life ==
André Richard was born in Bern, Switzerland on 18 April 1944. He initially trained to be a chef in his native city before beginning training as a singer in Geneva in 1965. He studied singing, music theory and music composition at the Conservatoire de Musique de Genève (CMG). He graduating with a diploma in music theory from CMG in 1972, and then taught at CMG as a professor of solfège from 1972 to 1975.

Richard pursued further studies at the Hochschule für Musik Freiburg with Klaus Huber and Brian Ferneyhough; studying there from 1975 to 1978. He simultaneously pursued studies in electronic music at the SWR Experimental Studio (SWRES) of the Heinrich Strobel Foundation and at IRCAM in Paris. He studied with Hans Peter Haller at SWRES. In 1980 he was appointed director of the Institute for New Music (INW) at the Hochschule für Musik Freiburg. He remaining administrator of the INW for several years; during which time he organized and oversaw the INW's Horizonte concert series.

In 1983 Richard co-founded the Solistenchor Freiburg (sometimes given as Freiburger Solistenchor; English: Freiburg Soloists' Choir) with Arturo Tamayo, and was subsequently appointed that choir's artistic director in 1984. The group's first performance in 1983 featured the German premiere of Luigi Nono's Das atmende Klarsein. Richard developed a close collaborative partnership with Nono; with the Solistenchor Freiburg performing several world premieres by the composer. Richard also collaborated with Nono on performances in Germany of Nono's opera Prometeo. He also appeared as a conductor at the Warsaw Autumn in 1988 with the Polish premiere of Nono's Diario Polacco no 2, Quando stanno morendo.

Richard authored scholarly articles on Nono and his music which were published in 1991 and 1993. Richard remained conductor of the Freiburger Solistenchor until 2005. He has subsequently taught seminars on performance practices of Nono's music, and was interviewed extensively by Nono's biographer Carola Nielinger-Vakil for her book on the composer.

In 1989 Richard succeeded Hans Peter Haller as the director of SWRES; a post he held until 2005. With his studio, he has appeared internationally in numerous realizations of new works with integrated live-electronic means as interpreter and conductor. He has worked as a freelance musician since 2006.

== Awards ==
- 1990 Reinhold-Schneider-Preis of the city of Freiburg
- 1994 Prize of the Christoph and Stephan Kaske Foundation
- 1998 European Culture Prize for New Music

== Partial list of works ==
- 1983 Von aussen her… for violin and piano
- 1985/86 Echanges for Ensemble and Live electronic music
- 1987 Musique de rue Scenic music for ensemble and tape
- 1989–1990 Glidif. a sonar e cantar for bass clarinet, double bass clarinet, 2 double basses and live electronics
