= Contrappunto dialettico alla mente =

1968 composition by Luigi Nono

- by Luigi Nono
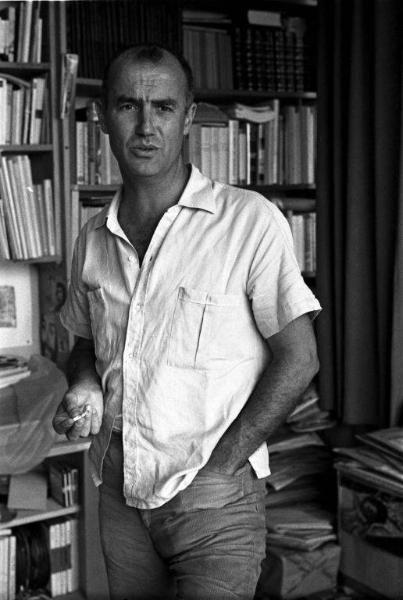
- Luigi Nono in 1968
- Composed: 1968
- Published: Ricordi
- Duration: 19:51
- Movements: 4
- Scoring: Soprano, actors, and choir

Premiere
- Date: December, 1968
- Location: Palermo

Contrappunto dialettico alla mente (Italian: Dialectical counterpoint for the mind) is a composition for two-channel magnetic tape by Italian composer Luigi Nono. It was composed in 1968.

== Composition ==
This composition is based on a madrigal-comedy entitled Contrappunto bestiale alla mente by Adriano Banchieri included in his work Festino nella sera del giovedì grasso avanti cena (Small Party before Dinner on the Evening of Carnival Thursday). As Nono explained in his writings, "I'm seeking to reflect the type of musical process used by Banchieri: the focus on the voice, introduction of sound material of the time, humorous and parodic distortion especially in the lyrical and dramatic elements... but in today's actuality...". The title ironically refers to the contrappunto alla mente, which was a common practice in Banchieri's time, and involved the improvisation of a counterpoint to a given bassline.

Contrappunto dialettico alla mente was commissioned by the Prix Italia, a composition contest held annually by the RAI, in February 1968. For this occasion, they asked for an opera that would not be performed on a stage, but would rather be broadcast on radio. The realization was carried out by the Studio di fonologia della RAI between May and July 1968. However, the RAI eventually decided not to admit the piece for "courtesy" reasons, since its content could stir up some political controversy amongst US representatives; most of the text as well as the explanations of the first part of the piece by Nono suggest that the Contrappunto is an act of accusation against the US Government for its internal racial discrimination and the violence that took place against black people during those years. The same thing happened to Nono in 1964, when the content in La fabbrica illuminata motivated its exclusion from the prize.

The piece was first played in Palermo on December 27, 1968, and was later used for a choreography by Giuseppe Urbani with scenes by Carlo Ranzi in 1972, entitled Intolleranza, in reference to his own previous stage piece, Intolleranza 1960, written in 1961. Nono dedicated this piece to Douglas Bravo, the leader of the National Liberation Front of Venezuela. It was published that year by Ricordi in Milan.

== Structure ==
This piece for tape has a total duration of 19 minutes and 51 seconds. It is divided into four sections followed by a brief 36-second introduction. The list of sections is set as follows:

- Introduction
- 1. Il diletto delitto moderno (Malcolm) (The Pleasant Modern Crime) (starts at 0:36)
- 2a. Mascherata dei vecchietti (Masquerade of the Little Old Men) (starts at 4:59)
- 2b. Interludio dei venditori di soffio (Interlude of the Breath-Sellers) (starts at 8:51)
- 3. I cervellini cantano un madrigale (The Scatterbrains Sing a Madrigal) (starts at 10:05)
- 4. Lo zio Sam racconta una novella (Uncle Sam Tells a Story) (starts at 14:36)
- 1 (reprise). Il diletto delitto moderno (Malcolm) (starts at 18:27)

For this piece, Nono used the voices of soprano Liliana Poli, actor Umberto Troni, actresses Elisa Kadigia Bove, Elena Vicini, and Marisa Mazzoni and the RAI Choir with Nino Antonellini as the chorus master; however, there is also an uncredited cameo by the RAI sound engineer Marino Zuccheri. Nono also used recordings of items collected at the Rialto market, sounds of water from the Venetian Lagoon, the Marangona (the biggest bell in Piazza San Marco), sounds of pipes, and, finally, sounds produced at the Studio di Fonologia using square and sawtooth wave generators. However, Nono did not only use new material for this composition, but he also used existing material from his own repertoire.

The piece uses texts from different authors covering different topics. Il diletto delitto moderno is an evocation of the murder of Malcolm X, the black civil rights campaigner, a poem by black American Sonia Sanchez which is spoken, sung, shouted, and even whispered. Mascherata dei vecchietti, Interludio dei venditori di soffio, and I cervellini cantano un madrigale are all based on experimental text by Nanni Balestrini, all of them consisting of twenty-five lines of four interwoven strands. Finally, the fourth section uses an ironic text extracted from a pamphlet opposing the Vietnam War written by Enraged Women of the Progressive Labor Party in Harlem.

The compositional technique used by Nono for this composition involved thorough and detailed sound manipulation. Gorodecki described it as an exploration of "the acoustical nature of sound, as well as the extensive possibilities involving filters, micro-intervallic sound-bands and tape editing techniques of layering, over-lapping, intercutting, and collage". He attributed this technique to Nono's dissatisfaction with the edifices of musical establishment, audience and concert hall.

== Reception ==
This composition has often been described as one of Nono's major compositions and has been compared to Karlheinz Stockhausen's Gesang der Jünglinge (1955–56) for both its compositional style and its pioneering character in electroacoustic music. John Baldacchino described the piece as a pioneering "electronic montage" that makes the listener feel "the strength of the historic threshold pressing its weight on the art-form".
