= Heinrich Strobel =

Heinrich Strobel may refer to:

- Heinrich Strobel (musicologist) (1898-1970), German musicologist
- Heinrich Ströbel (1869-1944), German journalist
