= Electroacoustic music =

Art music genre, originated in 1950s

Electroacoustic music is a genre of Western art music in which composers use recording technology and audio signal processing to manipulate the timbres of acoustic sounds in the creation of pieces of music. It originated around the middle of the 20th century, following the incorporation of electronic sound production into formal compositional practice. The initial developments in electroacoustic music composition to fixed media during the 20th century are associated with the activities of the Groupe de recherches musicales at the ORTF in Paris, the home of musique concrète, the Studio for Electronic Music in Cologne, where the focus was on the composition of elektronische Musik, and the Columbia-Princeton Electronic Music Center in New York City, where tape music, electronic music, and computer music were all explored. Practical electronic music instruments began to appear in the early 20th century.

== Tape music ==
Tape music is an integral part of musique concrète, which uses the tape recorder as its central musical source. The music can utilise pre-recorded sound fragments and the creation of loops, which can be altered and manipulated through techniques such as editing and playback speed manipulation. The work of Halim El-Dabh is perhaps the earliest example of tape (or, in this case, wire recording) music. El-Dabh's The Expression of Zaar, first presented in Cairo, Egypt, in 1944, was an early work using musique concrète–like techniques similar to those developed in Paris during the same period. El-Dabh would later become more famous for his work at the Columbia-Princeton Electronic Music Center, where in 1959 he composed the influential piece Leiyla and the Poet.

Composer John Cage's assembly of the Williams Mix serves as an example of the rigors of tape music. First, Cage created a 192-page score. Over the course of a year, 600 sounds were assembled and recorded. Cut tape segments for each occurrence of each sound were accumulated on the score. Then the cut segments were spliced to one of eight tapes, work finished on January 16, 1953. The premiere performance (realization) of the 4'15" work was given on March 21, 1953, at the University of Illinois, Urbana.

== Electronic music ==
In Cologne, elektronische Musik, pioneered in 1949–51 by the composer Herbert Eimert and the physicist Werner Meyer-Eppler, was based solely on electronically generated (synthetic) sounds, particularly sine waves. The beginning of the development of electronic music has been traced back to "the invention of the valve [vacuum tube] in 1906". The precise control afforded by the studio allowed for what Eimert considered to be the subjection of everything, "to the last element of the single note", to serial permutation, "resulting in a completely new way of composing sound"; in the studio, serial operations could be applied to elements such as timbre and dynamics. The common link between the two schools is that the music is recorded and performed through loudspeakers, without a human performer. The majority of electroacoustic pieces use a combination of recorded sound and synthesized or processed sounds, and the schism between Schaeffer's and Eimert's approaches has been overcome, the first major example being Karlheinz Stockhausen's Gesang der Jünglinge of 1955–56.

== Circuit bending ==
Circuit bending is the creative short-circuiting of low voltage, battery-powered electronic audio devices such as guitar effects, children's toys and small synthesizers to create new musical instruments and sound generators. Emphasizing spontaneity and randomness, the techniques of circuit bending have been commonly associated with noise music, though many more conventional contemporary musicians and musical groups have been known to experiment with "bent" instruments.

== Examples of notable works ==
- Milton Babbitt – Philomel (1964)
- Luciano Berio – Thema (Omaggio a Joyce) (1958–59)
- Johanna Beyer – Music of the Spheres (1938)
- Konrad Boehmer – Aspekt (1964–66), Apocalipsis cum figuris (1984)
- Pierre Boulez – Répons (1981–84)
- John Cage – Imaginary Landscape No. 1 (1939)
- Mario Davidovsky – Synchronisms No. 6 for Piano and Electronic Sound (1970)
- Halim El-Dabh – Leiyla and the Poet (1961)
- Karel Goeyvaerts – Nummer 5 met zuivere tonen (1953)
- Jean-Michel Jarre – Deserted Palace (1972)
- Phil Kline – Unsilent Night (1992), for cassettes in boomboxes
- Gottfried Michael Koenig – Project 1 (1964), Project 2 (1966)
- Alvin Lucier – I Am Sitting in a Room (1969)
- Ivo Malec – Triola, ou Symphonie pour moi-même (1977–78)
- Luigi Nono – La fabbrica illuminata (1964), A floresta é jovem e cheia de vida (1966), Contrappunto dialettico alla mente (1968), Como una ola de fuerza y luz (1971–72)
- Pauline Oliveros – Sonic Meditations, "Teach Yourself to Fly" (1961)
- Daphne Oram - "Still Point" (1948)
- Else Marie Pade – Symphonie Magnétophonique (1958)
- Henri Pousseur – Scambi (1957), Trois Visages de Liège (1961), Paraboles-Mix (1972), Seize Paysages planétairesl (2000)
- Steve Reich – Pendulum Music (1968), for microphones, amplifiers, speakers and performers
- Pierre Schaeffer – Cinq études de bruits (1948)
- Karlheinz Stockhausen – Gesang der Jünglinge (1955–56), Kontakte (1958–60), Mixtur (1964), Mikrophonie I & II (1964 and 1965), Telemusik (1966), Hymnen (1966–67), Oktophonie (1991), Cosmic Pulses (2006–2007)
- James Tenney – For Ann (rising) (1969)
- Edgard Varèse – Poème électronique (1958)
- Charles Wuorinen – Time's Encomium (1969)
- Iannis Xenakis – Persepolis (1971)

== Electronic and electroacoustic instruments ==
- Birotron (1974), Dave Biro
- Buchla 100 and 200 serie (1960s–70s), Buchla Lightning I (1991) and Buchla Lightning II (1995) by Don Buchla
- Cembaphon (1951), Harald Bode
- Chamberlin (1946)
- Clavinet (1964)
- Clavioline (early 1950s) and Concert Clavioline (1953), Harald Bode
- Clavivox, Circle Machine, Bass Line Generator, Rhythm Modulator, Bandito the Bongo Artist, and Electronium (1950s–60s), Raymond Scott
- DX7 (1983), Yamaha
- Elektronium (in German)
- EMS Synthi AKS (1972)
- Fairlight CMI (1978)
- Gravikord (1986), Robert Grawi
- Kraakdoos / Cracklebox (1960s–70s), Michel Waisvisz
- Mellotron (1960s)
- Melochord (1947–49), Harald Bode
- Melodium (1938), Harald Bode
- Moog synthesizer (1965), Robert Moog
- Ondioline (1939), Georges Jenny
- Optigan (1971)
- Orchestron (1975), Vako Synthesizers
- Polychord (1950) and Polychord III (1951), Harald Bode
- Electronic Sackbut (1945), Hugh Le Caine
- Sampler (musical instrument)
- Synclavier (1975), Jon Appleton, Sydney A. Alonso and Cameron Jones
- Telharmonium (1897), Thaddeus Cahill
- Theremin (1928), Leon Theremin
- Tuttivox (1953), Harald Bode
- UPIC (1977), Iannis Xenakis and CEMAMu
- Warbo Formant organ (1937), Harald Bode

== Centers, associations and events for electroacoustics and related arts ==
Important centers of research and composition can be found around the world, and there are numerous conferences and festivals which present electroacoustic music, notably the International Computer Music Conference, the international conference on New Interfaces for Musical Expression, the Electroacoustic Music Studies Conference, and the Ars Electronica Festival (Linz, Austria).

A number of national associations promote the art form, notably the Canadian Electroacoustic Community (CEC) in Canada, the Society for Electro-Acoustic Music in the United States (SEAMUS) in the US, the Australasian Computer Music Association in Australia and New Zealand, and Sound and Music (previously the Sonic Arts Network) in the UK. The Computer Music Journal and Organised Sound are the two most important peer-reviewed journals dedicated to electroacoustic studies, while several national associations produce print and electronic publications.

=== Festivals ===
There have been a number of festivals that feature electroacoustic music. Early festivals, such as Donaueschingen Festival, founded in 1921, were some of the first to include electroacoustic instruments and pieces. This was followed by ONCE Festival of New Music in the 1950s, and since the 1960s, there has been a growth of festivals that focus exclusively on electroacoustic music.

- 60x60 (Intl.)
- Akousma (Canada)
- Ars Electronica (Austria)
- Berlin Atonal (Germany)
- Cybersonica (UK)
- Dias de Música Electroacústica (Intl.)
- Electro-music (US)
- Electroacoustic Music Days (Greece)
- Electronic Music Midwest (US)
- Electrofringe (Australia)
- Expo '70 (Japan)
- International Computer Music Conference (Intl.)
- International Electroacoustic Music Festival (Cuba)
- L'espace du son (Belgium)
- Les Siestes Electroniques (France)
- Music For People & Thingamajigs Festival (US)
- New Interfaces for Musical Expression (Int.)
- Numusic (Norway)
- NWEAMO (US)
- Olympia Experimental Music Festival (US)
- ONCE Festival of New Music (US)
- Présences Électroniques (France)
- Pro Musica Nova (Germany)
- Spark Festival (US)
- TodaysArt (The Netherlands)

=== Conferences and symposiums ===
Alongside paper presentations, workshops and seminars, many of these events also feature concert performances or sound installations created by those attending or which are related to the theme of the conference / symposium.

== See also ==
- Acousmatic music
- Computer music
- Digital signal processing
- Experimental music
- International Documentation of Electroacoustic Music
- Japanoise
- List of acousmatic-music composers
- Live electronic music
- Sonology
- Sound recording and reproduction
- Sound art
