= Prometeo =

Opera by Luigi Nono

- Opera (Works) by Luigi Nono
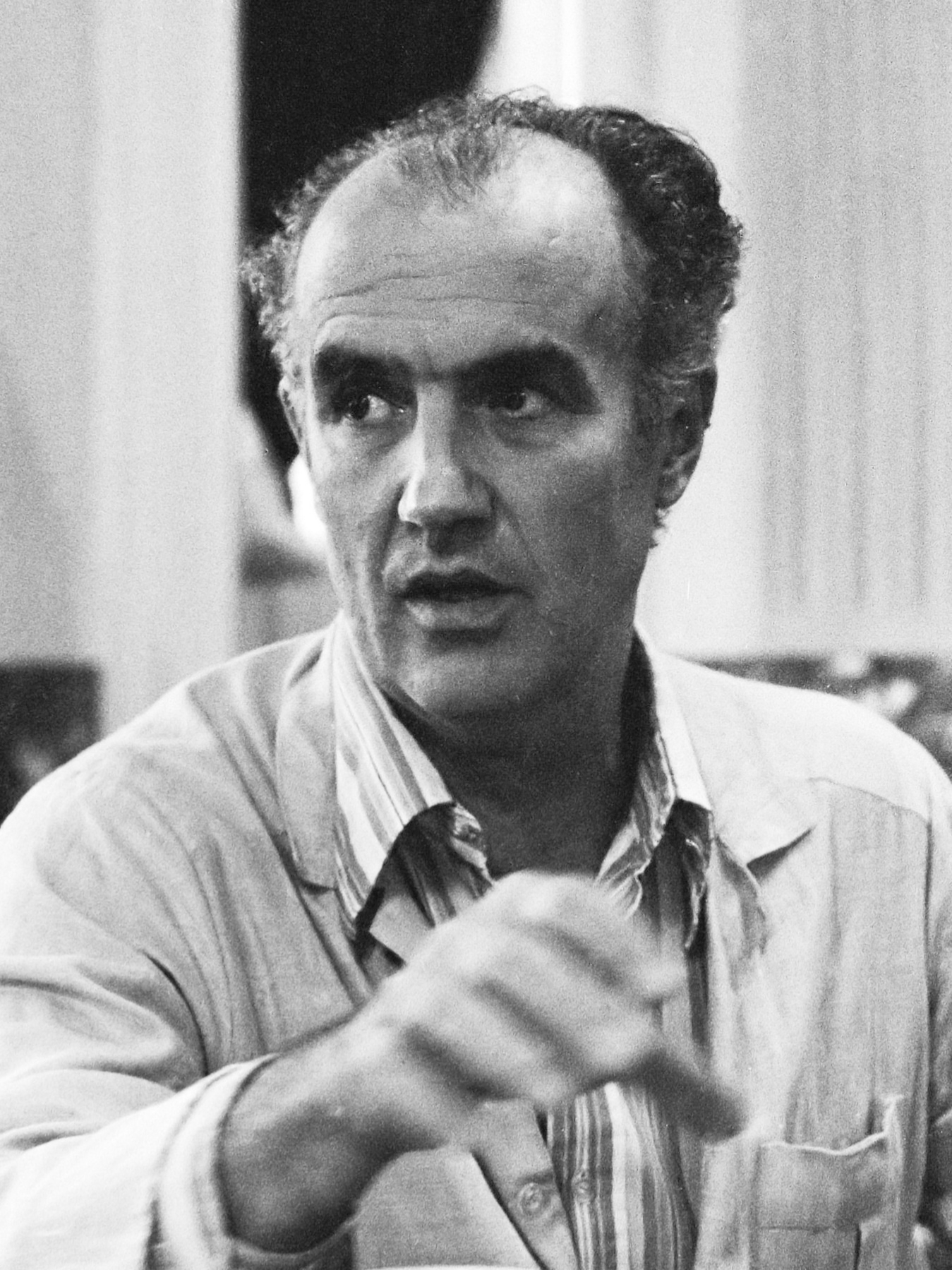
- The composer in 1979
- Librettist: Massimo Cacciari
- Language: Italian
- Based on: Myth of Prometheus, in texts by Aeschylus, Walter Benjamin, Rainer Maria Rilke and others
- Premiere: 25 September 1984; San Lorenzo, Venice

Prometeo (Prometheus) is an "opera" by Luigi Nono, written between 1981 and 1984 and revised in 1985. Here the word "opera" carries the generic Italian meaning of "works", as in work of art, and not its usual meaning in English. Indeed, Nono scornfully labels Prometeo a "tragedia dell'ascolto", a tragedy of listening. Objectively it can be considered a sequence of nine cantatas, the longest lasting 23 minutes. The Italian libretto, by Massimo Cacciari, selects from texts by such varied authors as Aeschylus, Walter Benjamin and Rainer Maria Rilke and presents the different versions of the myth of Prometheus without telling any version literally.

== Vocal and orchestral forces ==
Prometeo in its final form (1985) is scored for:

- 5 vocal soloists (2 sopranos, 2 altos, 1 tenor)
- 2 speakers (one male, one female)
- choir (12 singers)
- 4 orchestral groups, each consisting of: flute/piccolo, clarinet, bassoon, horn, trumpet, trombone, 4 violins, viola, cello, double bass
- 7 glasses
- 6 instrumental soloists: bass flute/piccolo/C flute, contrabass clarinet/clarinet in B♭/clarinet in E♭, trombone/tuba/euphonium, viola, cello, double bass
- 2 conductors. Sounds from the vocalists and instrumentalists are electronically manipulated. The duration of the final version is given as 135 minutes.

== Nine sections ==
The work's nine sections are:

- Prologo
- Isola Prima
- Isola Seconda
- Interludio Primo
- Tre Voci (a)
- Isola Terza – Quarta – Quinta
- Tre Voci (b)
- Interludio Secondo
- Stasimo Secondo

== Performance history ==
At the premiere of the first version, at the Church of San Lorenzo in Venice on 25 September 1984, Claudio Abbado was the conductor, with the Chamber Orchestra of Europe, a choir from the Hochschule für Musik Freiburg, and the following vocal soloists: Ingrid Ade, Monika Bair-Ivenz, Bernadette Manca di Nissa, Susanne Otto, and Mario Bolognesi. No Conductor II was deployed. The revised and final Prometeo premiered at Teatro alla Scala in Milan on 25 September 1985, conducted by Peter Hirsch. Nono banned all photography of the production in an attempt to stop what he called "artistic consumerism."

Prometeo had its first international premieres in France and Germany in 1987. The performances at Festival d'Automne in Paris and Alte Oper Frankfurt featured Ensemble Modern and conductors Friedrich Goldmann and David Shallon. A March 1997 production by Robert Wilson in Brussels (Festival Ars Musica / La Monnaie) was conducted by Péter Eötvös and Kwamé Ryan. The work was later also presented as part of the Berliner Festspiele in September 2011 under Matilda Hofman (Conductor II) and Arturo Tamayo (Conductor I); Cyndia Sieden, Silke Evers, Susanne Otto, Noa Frenkel, and Hubert Mayer were the vocal soloists, with the Konzerthausorchester Berlin. Its South American premiere took place at Argentina's Teatro Colón, in November 2013.

== Recordings ==
- EMI Classics 5 55209 2 – 1993, live in Salzburg: Ingrid Ade-Jesemann, Monika Bair-Ivenz, Susanne Otto, Helena Rasker, Peter Hall; Solistenchor Freiburg; Ensemble Modern; Ingo Metzmacher, conductor
- Col Legno WWE2SACD20605 – 2003, live in Freiburg: Petra Hoffmann, Monika Bair-Ivenz, Susanne Otto, Noa Frenkel, Hubert Mayer, singers; Sigrun Schell, Gregor Dalal (speakers); Freiburg Soloists’ Choir, ensemble recherche, Soloists’ Ensembles of the Freiburg Philharmonic and SWR Symphony Orchestras, Experimentalstudio Heinrich-Strobel-Stiftung of the SWR Freiburg (André Richard, director); Peter Hirsch (1st conductor), Kwamé Ryan (2nd conductor)

Stradivarius, 2017. Ensemble Prometeo, Orchestra Arturo Toscanini, solisti vari. Marco Angius, direttore. Registrazione live Teatro Farnese, Parma
