= International Documentation of Electroacoustic Music =

Online database

The International Documentation of Electroacoustic Music (EMDoku) is an extensive online database, which contains detailed information on over 51000 works, 11000 authors as well as media (CD, DVD, tape, etc.), labels and studios. Electroacoustic music is understood as an umbrella term for tape music, acousmatic music, electronic music, musique concrète, field recordings, computer music, radio art, sound art, sound installations, live electronics etc., and includes performances and venues such as concert hall, radio, film, installation, media and internet.

In addition to music and media science research, the documentation is intended to enable historically informed performance practice and interpretation research. It is considered as an "essential initiative" for the preservation of electroacoustic music.

== History ==
On the occasion of the project Berlin Kulturstadt Europas, E88, Folkmar Hein, head of the electronic studios of the TU Berlin, initiated the work on this documentation. With the collaboration of Golo Föllmer and Roland Frank, it was published in book form for the first time in 1992 ("Dokumentation elektroakustischer Musik in Europa"). In 1996, an extended version titled "Internationale Dokumentation elektroakustischer Musik" was published by Pfau-Verlag under the direction of Folkmar Hein and Thomas Seelig. Another version can be found on the DEGEM CD-ROM Klangkunst in Deutschland, which was published in 2000 as a supplement to the Neue Zeitschrift für Musik Since 1996, the database is accessible online.

The documentation is supported by the German Society for Electroacoustic Music.
