= Hansjörg Pauli =

Swiss musicologist

Hansjörg Pauli (3 March 1931 – 15 February 2007) was a Swiss musicologist, pianist, journalist, music critic, screenwriter, and film director.

== Life and career ==
Hansjörg Pauli was born in Winterthur, Switzerland on 3 March 1931. He studied at the Winterthur Conservatory from which he graduated in 1953. He pursued further studies in London with Hans Keller. He began working as a music critic and journalist for Swiss newspapers in 1956. One of the publications he wrote criticism for was Neues Winterthurer Tageblatt. He also worked as a jazz pianist in the 1950s.

From 1960 to 1965 Pauli worked at Radio Zürich on new music broadcasts, and between 1965 and 1968 he was a music editor for NDR-Fernsehen where he directed TV documentaries and produced films by Richard Leacock, Rolf Liebermann, Klaus Wildenhahn and others. Starting in 1968 he became a freelance writer. He joined the faculty of the University of Television and Film Munich in 1969.

Pauli was a prominent authority on the music of Luigi Nono. He also worked on films as a screenwriter and director. Films he wrote and directed himself include Webern, oder Ein Leben für die Kunst (1971–3), Strawinsky Weekend (1972–3), and Klänge machen Leute: Funktion und Mechanik von Filmmusik (1973).

== Articles by Hansjörg Pauli ==
- 'On Strawinsky's Threni', Tempo, New Series, No. 49 (Autumn, 1958), pp. 16–17+21-33
- 'Hans Werner Henze's Italian Music', The Score, No.25, June 1959
- 'Für wen komponieren Sie eigentlich?' Reihe Fischer, vol. F 16. Frankfurt am Main: Fischer, 1971.
- 'Bernard Herrmanns Musik zu Citizen Kane', Dissonance 26 (November 1990): 12–18.
