= Luigi Nono =

Italian composer (1924-1990)

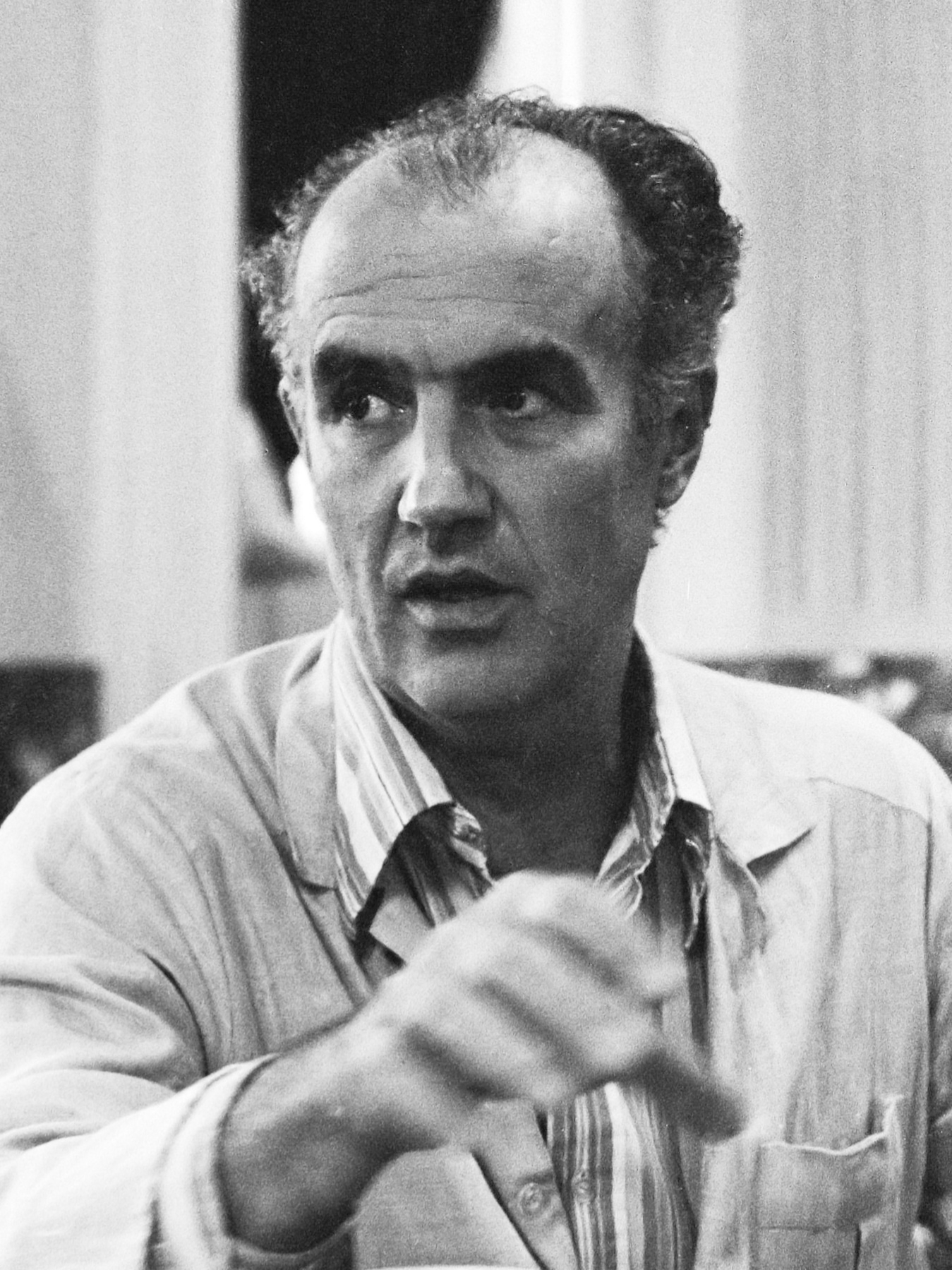
- Nono in 1979
- Born: 29 January 1924; Venice, Italy
- Died: 8 May 1990 (aged 66); Venice
- Education: Venice Conservatory; University of Padua
- Occupation: Composer
- Organizations: Darmstadt School
- Works: List of compositions

Luigi Nono (Italian: [luˈiːdʒi ˈnɔːno]; 29 January 1924 – 8 May 1990) was an Italian avant-garde composer of classical music.

== Biography ==
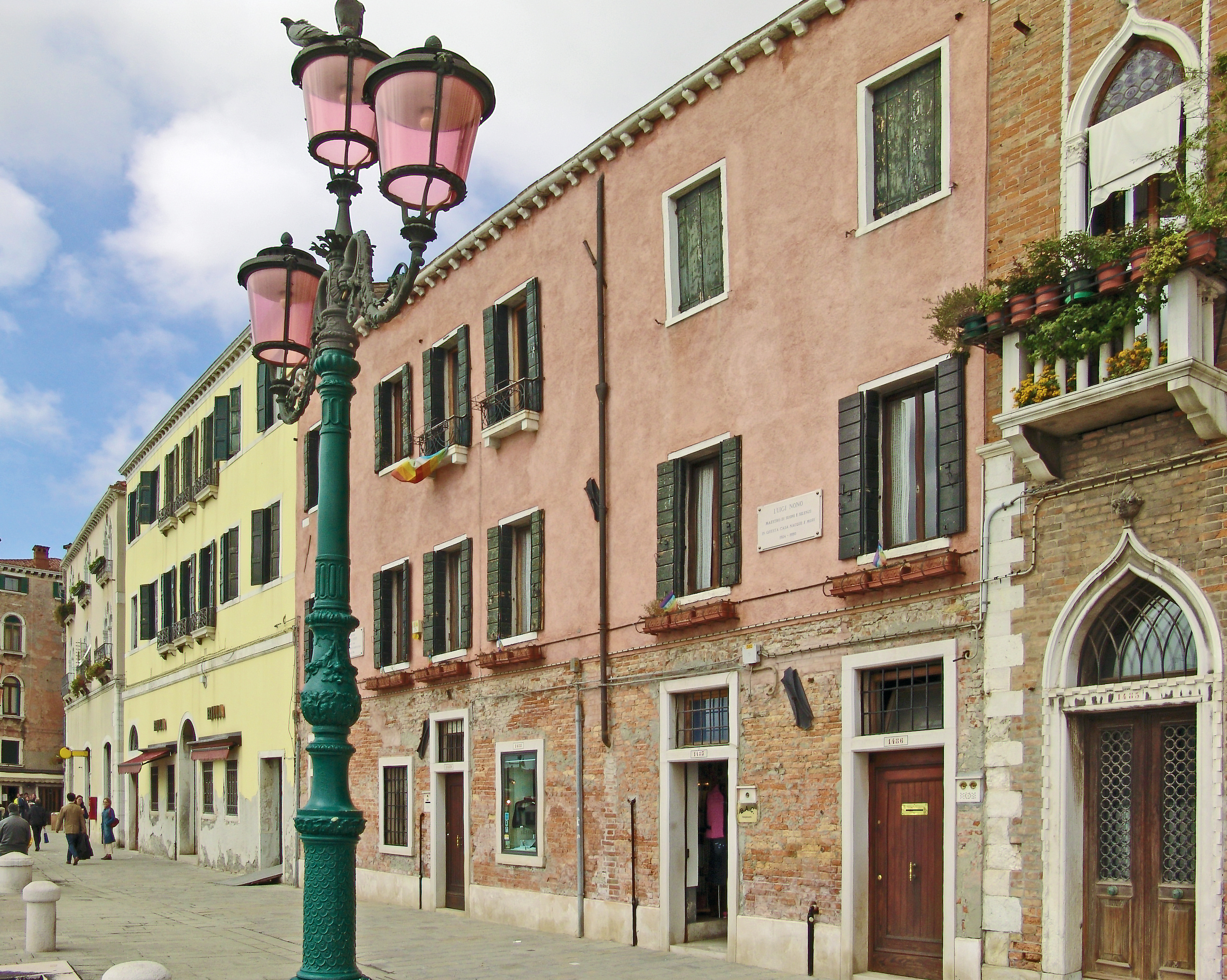
House in Venice where Nono was born, at Ponte Longo, Fondamenta delle Zattere, Dorsoduro

=== Early years ===
Nono, born in Venice, was a member of a wealthy artistic family; his grandfather was a notable painter. Nono began music lessons with Gian Francesco Malipiero at the Venice Conservatory in 1941, where he acquired knowledge of the Renaissance madrigal tradition, amongst other styles. After graduating with a degree in law from the University of Padua, he was given encouragement in composition by Bruno Maderna. Through Maderna, he became acquainted with Hermann Scherchen—then Maderna's conducting teacher—who gave Nono further tutelage and was an early mentor and advocate of his music.

Scherchen presented Nono's first acknowledged work, the Variazioni canoniche sulla serie dell'op. 41 di A. Schönberg in 1950, at the Darmstädter Ferienkurse. The Variazioni canoniche, based on the twelve-tone series of Arnold Schoenberg's Op. 41, including the "Ode-to-Napoleon" hexachord, marked Nono as a committed composer of anti-fascist political orientation. (Variazioni canoniche also used a six-element row of rhythmic values.) Nono had been a member of the Italian Resistance during the Second World War. His political commitment, while allying him with some of his contemporaries at Darmstadt such as Henri Pousseur and in the earlier days Hans Werner Henze, distinguished him from others, including Pierre Boulez and Karlheinz Stockhausen. Nevertheless, it was with Boulez and Stockhausen that Nono became one of the leaders of the New Music during the 1950s.

=== 1950s and the Darmstadt School ===
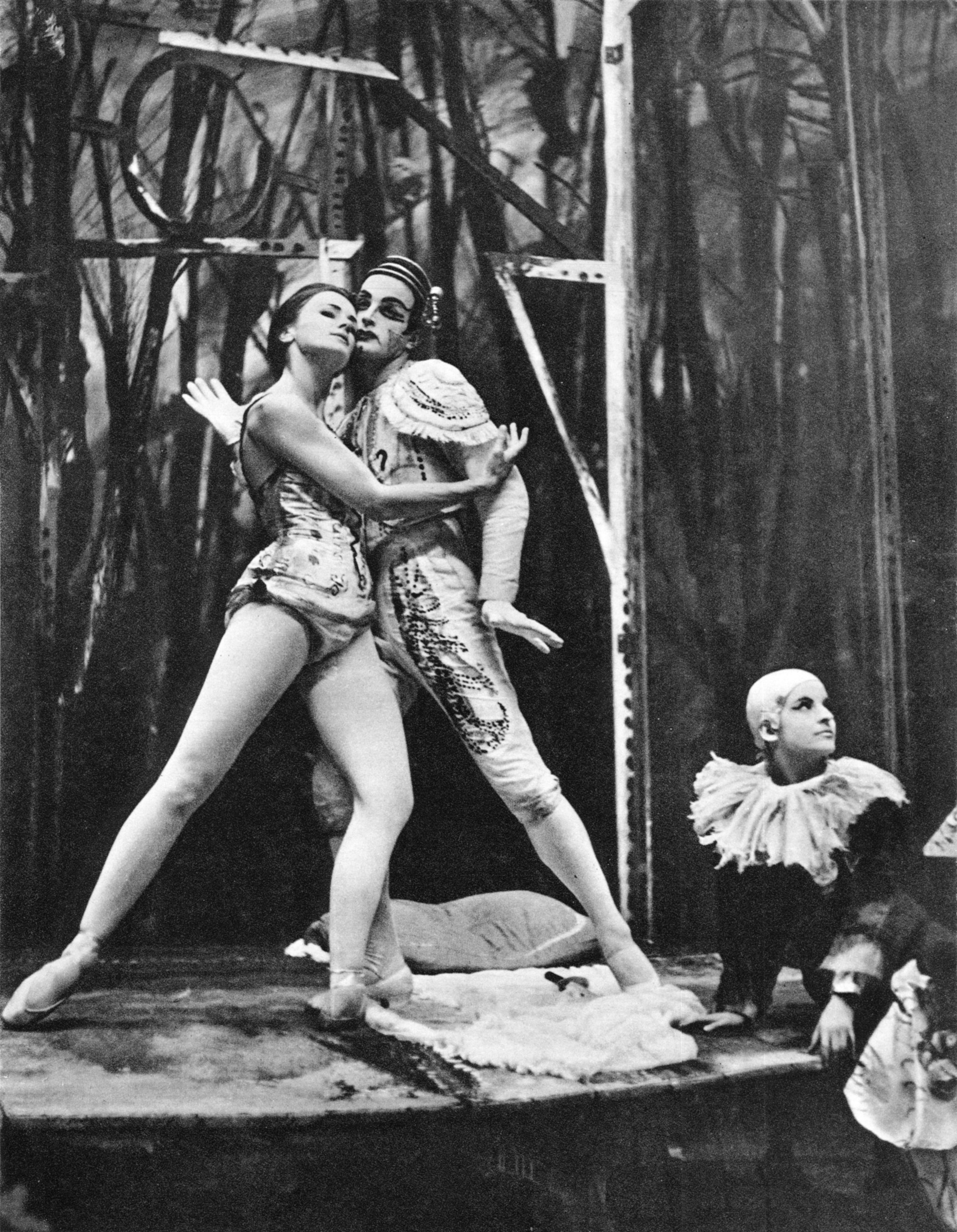
Maria Krzyszkowska and Witold Gruca in a 1962 production of Nono's ballet, Il mantello rosso (1954)

A number of Nono's early works were first performed at the Darmstädter Ferienkurse including Tre epitaffi per Federico García Lorca (1951–53), La Victoire de Guernica (1954)—intended, like Picasso's painting, as an indictment of the wartime atrocity—and Incontri (1955). The Liebeslied (1954) was written for Nono's wife-to-be, Nuria Schoenberg (daughter of Arnold Schoenberg), whom he met at the 1953 world première of Moses und Aron in Hamburg. They married in 1955. An atheist, Nono had enrolled as a member of the Italian Communist Party in 1952.

The world première of Il canto sospeso (1955–56) for solo voices, chorus, and orchestra brought Nono international recognition and acknowledgment as a successor to Webern. "Reviewers noted with amazement that Nono's canto sospeso achieved a synthesis—to a degree hardly thought possible—between an uncompromisingly avant-garde style of composition and emotional, moral expression (in which there was an appropriate and complementary treatment of the theme and text)".

If any evidence exists that Webern's work does not mark the esoteric "expiry" of Western music in a pianissimo of aphoristic shreds, then it is provided by Luigi Nono's Il Canto Sospeso ... The 32-year-old composer has proved himself to be the most powerful of Webern's successors. (Kölner Stadt-Anzeiger, 26 October 1956).

This work, regarded by Swiss musicologist Jürg Stenzl as one of the central masterpieces of the 1950s, is a commemoration of the victims of Fascism, incorporating farewell letters written by political prisoners before execution. Musically, Nono breaks new ground, not only by the "exemplary balance between voices and instruments" but in the motivic, point-like vocal writing in which words are fractured into syllables exchanged between voices to form floating, diversified sonorities—which may be likened to an imaginative extension of Schoenberg's "Klangfarbenmelodie technique". Nono himself emphasized his lyrical intentions in an interview with Hansjörg Pauli, and a connection to Schoenberg's Survivor from Warsaw is postulated by Guerrero. However, Stockhausen, in his 15 July 1957 Darmstadt lecture, "Sprache und Musik" (published the next year in the Darmstädter Beiträge zur Neuen Musik and, subsequently, in Die Reihe), stated:

In certain pieces in the "Canto", Nono composed the text as if to withdraw it from the public eye where it has no place... In sections II, VI, IX and in parts of III, he turns speech into sounds, noises. The texts are not delivered, but rather concealed in such a regardlessly strict and dense musical form that they are hardly comprehensible when performed.

Why, then, texts at all, and why these texts?

Here is an explanation. When setting certain parts of the letters about which one should be particularly ashamed that they had to be written, the musician assumes the attitude only of the composer who had previously selected the letters: he does not interpret, he does not comment. He rather reduces speech to its sounds and makes music with them. Permutations of vowel-sounds, a, ä, e, i, o, u; serial structure.

Should he not have chosen texts so rich in meaning in the first place, but rather sounds? At least for the sections where only the phonetic properties of speech are dealt with.

All-interval twelve-tone row from Nono's Il canto sospeso

Nono took strong exception, and informed Stockhausen that it was "incorrect and misleading, and that he had had neither a phonetic treatment of the text nor more or less differentiated degrees of comprehensibility of the words in mind when setting the text".) Despite Stockhausen's contrite acknowledgment, three years later, in a Darmstadt lecture of 8 July 1960 titled "Text—Musik—Gesang", Nono angrily wrote:

The legacy of these letters became the expression of my composition. And from this relationship between the words as a phonetic-semantic entirety and the music as the composed expression of the words, all of my later choral compositions are to be understood. And it is complete nonsense to conclude, from the analytic treatment of the sound shape of the text, that the semantic content is cast out. The question of why I chose just these texts and no others for a composition is no more intelligent than the question of why, in order to express the word "stupid", one uses the letters arranged in the order s-t-u-p-i-d.

Il canto sospeso has been described as an "everlasting warning"; indeed, it is a powerful refutation to the apparent claim made in an often-cited, but out-of-context phrase from philosopher Theodor W. Adorno that "to write poetry after Auschwitz is barbaric".

Nono was to return to such anti-fascist subject matter again, as in Diario polacco; Composizione no. 2 (1958–59), whose background included a journey through the Nazi concentration camps, and the "azione scenica" Intolleranza 1960, which caused a riot at its première in Venice, on 13 April 1961.

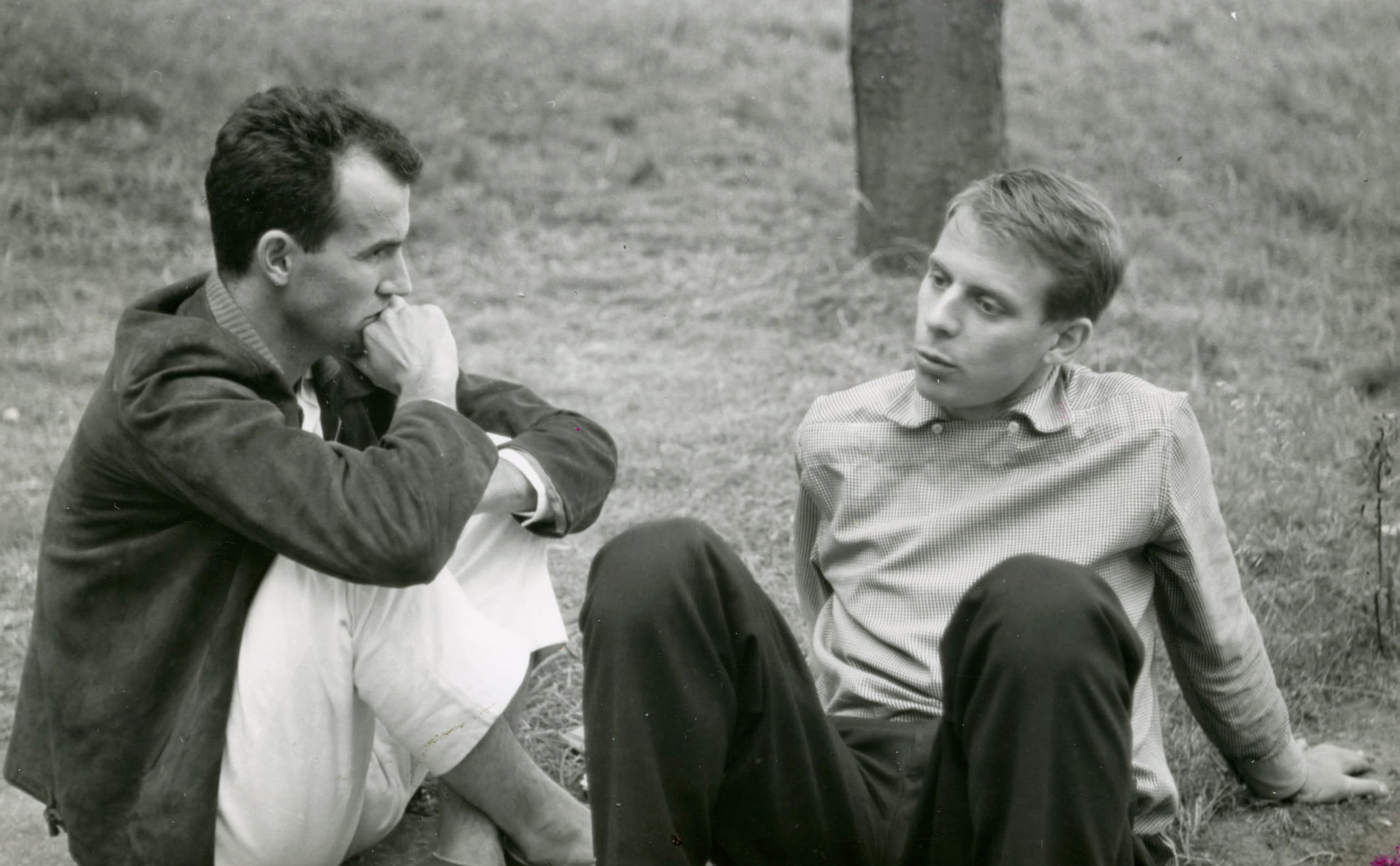
Nono and Karlheinz Stockhausen in Darmstadt, summer 1957

It was Nono who, in his 1958 lecture "Die Entwicklung der Reihentechnik", created the expression Darmstadt School to describe the music composed during the 1950s by himself and Pierre Boulez, Bruno Maderna, Karlheinz Stockhausen, and other composers not specifically named by him. He likened their significance to the Bauhaus in the visual arts and architecture.

On 1 September 1959, Nono delivered at Darmstadt a polemically charged lecture written in conjunction with his pupil Helmut Lachenmann, "Geschichte und Gegenwart in der Musik von Heute" ("History and Presence in the Music of Today"), in which he criticised and distanced himself from the composers of chance and aleatoric music, then in vogue, under the influence of American models such as John Cage. Although in a seminar a few days earlier Stockhausen had described himself as "perhaps the extreme antipode to Cage", when he spoke of "statistical structures" at the concert devoted to his works on the evening of the same day, the Marxist Nono saw this in terms of "fascist mass structures" and a violent argument erupted between the two friends. In combination with Nono's strongly negative reaction to Stockhausen's interpretation of text-setting in Il canto sospeso, this effectively ended their friendship until the 1980s, and thus disbanded the "avant-garde trinity" of Boulez, Nono, and Stockhausen.

=== 1960s and 1970s ===
Intolleranza 1960 may be viewed as the culmination of the composer's early style and aesthetics. The plot concerns the plight of an emigrant captured in a variety of scenarios relevant to modern capitalist society: working class exploitation, street demonstrations, political arrest and torture, concentration camp internment, refuge, and abandonment. Described as a "stage-action"—Nono explicitly forbade the title of "opera"—it utilizes an array of resources from large orchestra, chorus, tape, and loudspeakers to the "magic lantern" technique drawn from Meyerhold and Mayakovsky theatre practices of the 1920s to form a rich expressionist drama. Angelo Ripellino's libretto consisting of political slogans, poems, and quotations from Brecht and Sartre (including moments of Brechtian alienation), together with Nono's strident, anguished music, fully accords with the anti-capitalist fulmination the composer intended to communicate. The riot at the première in Venice was significantly due to the presence of both left- and right-wing political factions in the audience. Neo-nazis had attempted to disrupt proceedings with stink-bombs, nonetheless failing to prevent the performance ending triumphantly for Nono. Intolleranza is dedicated to Schoenberg.

In 1960, Nono started his lifelong exploration of electroacoustic music with the first composition for tape called Omaggio a Emilio Vedova. Dissatisfied with the post-war music establishment, electroacoustic music enabled the composer to explore new means of expression, which could be presented in unconventional musical settings. For instance, La fabbrica illuminata for soprano and tape (1964) did not only make use of factory noises and spoken words from factory workers, but was also performed in factories. The work can be considered a comment on the exploitation of industrial workers.

During the 1960s, Nono's musical activities became increasingly explicit and polemical in their subject, whether that be the warning against nuclear catastrophe (Canti di vita e d'amore: sul ponte di Hiroshima of 1962), the denunciation of capitalism (La Fabbrica Illuminata, 1964), the condemnation of Nazi war criminals in the wake of the Frankfurt Auschwitz trials (Ricorda cosi ti hanno fatto in Auschwitz, 1965), or of American imperialism in the Vietnam War (A floresta é jovem e cheja de vida, 1966). Nono began to incorporate documentary material (political speeches, slogans, extraneous sounds) on tape, and a new use of electronics, that he felt necessary to produce the "concrete situations" relevant to contemporary political issues. The instrumental writing tended to conglomerate the 'punctual' serial style of the early 1950s into groups, clusters of sounds—broadstrokes that complimented the use of tape collage. In keeping with his Marxist convictions as 'reinterpreted' through the writings of Antonio Gramsci, he brought this music into universities, trade-unions and factories where he gave lectures and performances. (The title of A floresta é jovem e cheja de vida contains a spelling error, the word "full" is "cheia" in Portuguese, not "cheja".

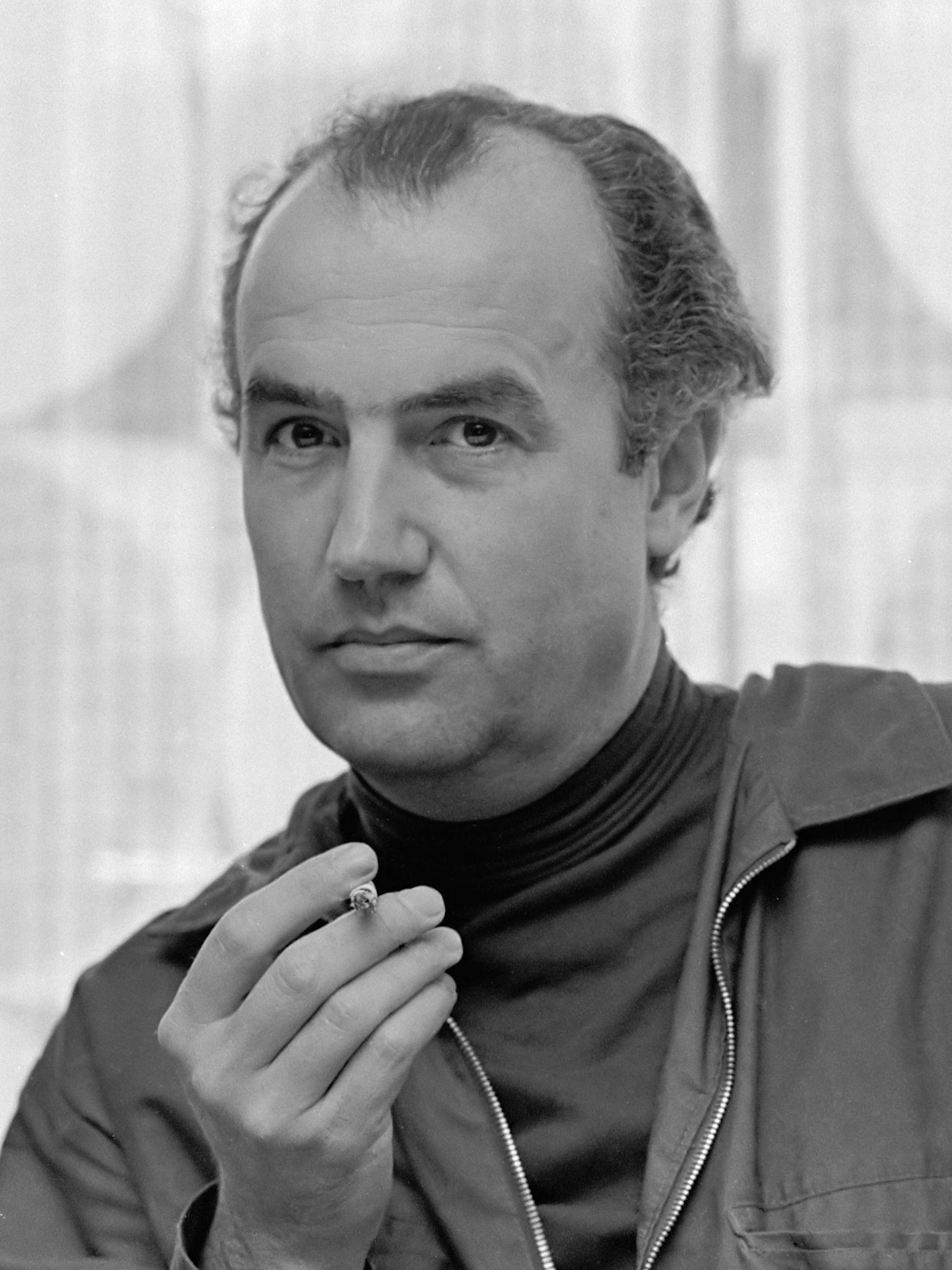
Nono in Hilversum, 1970

Nono's second period, commonly thought to have begun after Intolleranza, reaches its apogee in his second "azione scenica", Al gran sole carico d'amore (1972–74)—a collaboration with Yuri Lyubimov, who was then director of the Taganka Theatre in Moscow. In this large-scale stage work, Nono completely dispenses with a dramatic narrative, and presents pivotal moments in the history of Communism and class-struggle "side-by-side" to produce his "theatre of consciousness". The subject matter (as evident from the quotations from manifestos and poems, Marxist classics to the anonymous utterances of workers) deals with failed revolutions; the Paris Commune of 1871, the 1905 Russian Revolution, and the insurgency of militants in 1960s Chile under the leadership of Che Guevara and Tania Bunke. Then extremely topical, Al gran sole offers a multi-lateral spectacle and a moving meditation on the history of twentieth-century communism, as viewed through the prism of Nono's music. It was premiered at the Teatro Lirico, Milan, in 1975.

During this time, Nono visited the Soviet Union where he awakened the interest of Alfred Schnittke and Arvo Pärt, among others, in the contemporary practices of avant-garde composers of the West. Indeed, the 1960s and 70s were marked by frequent travels abroad, lecturing in Latin America, and making the acquaintance of leading left-wing intellectuals and activists. It was to mourn the death of Luciano Cruz, a leader of the Chilean Revolutionary Front, that Nono composed Como una ola de fuerza y luz (1972). Very much in the expressionist style of Al gran sole, with the use of large orchestra, tape and electronics, it became a kind of piano concerto with added vocal commentary.

Nono returned to the piano (with tape) for his next piece, ... sofferte onde serene ... (1976), written for his friend Maurizio Pollini after the common bereavement of two of their relatives (See Nono's Programme note|Col Legno,1994). With this work began a radically new, intimate phase of the composer's development—by way of Con Luigi Dallapiccola for percussion and electronics (1978) to Fragmente-Stille, an Diotima for string quartet (1980). One of Nono's most demanding works (both for performers and listeners), Fragmente-Stille is music on the threshold of silence. The score is interspersed with 53 quotations from the poetry of Hölderlin addressed to his "lover" Diotima, which are to be "sung" silently by the players during performance, striving for that "delicate harmony of inner life" (Hölderlin). A sparse, highly concentrated work commissioned by the Beethovenfest in Bonn, Fragmente-Stille reawakened great interest in Nono's music throughout Germany.

=== 1980s ===
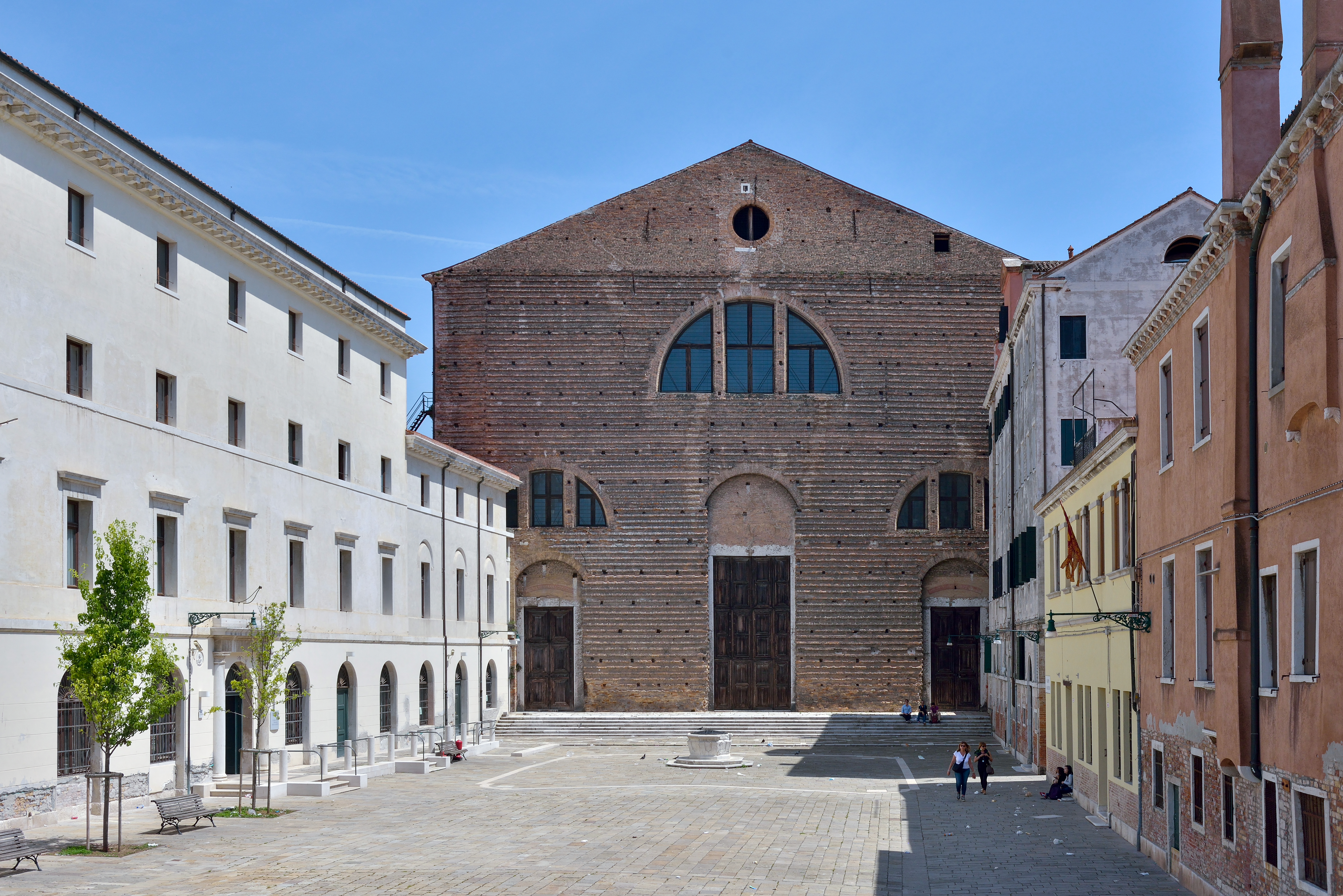
The Church of San Lorenzo, where Prometeo was premiered in 1984

Nono had been introduced to the Venice-based philosopher, Massimo Cacciari (Mayor of Venice from 1993 to 2000), who began to have an increasing influence on the composer's thought during the 1980s. Through Cacciari, Nono became immersed in the work of many German philosophers, including the writings of Walter Benjamin whose ideas on history (strikingly similar to the composer's own) formed the background to the monumental Prometeo—tragedia dell' ascolto (1984/85). The world premiere of the opera was staged in the Church of San Lorenzo, in Venice, on 25 September 1984, conducted by Claudio Abbado, with texts by Massimo Cacciari, lighting by Emilio Vedova, and wooden structures by Renzo Piano. Nono's late music is haunted by Benjamin's philosophy, especially the concept of history (Über den Begriff der Geschichte) which is given a central role in Prometeo.

Musically, Nono began to experiment with the new sound possibilities and production at the Experimentalstudio der Heinrich-Strobel-Stiftung des SWR in Freiburg. There, he devised a new approach to composition and technique, frequently involving the contributions of specialist musicians and technicians to realise his aims. The first fruits of these collaborations were Das atmende Klarsein (1981–82), Diario polacco II (1982)—an indictment against Soviet Cold War tyranny—and Guai ai gelidi mostri (1983). The new technologies allowed the sound to circulate in space, giving this dimension a role no less important than its emission. Such innovations became central to a new conception of time and space. These works were partly preparation for what many regard as his greatest achievement.

Prometeo has been described as "one of the best works of the 20th century". After the theatrical excesses of Al gran sole, which Nono later remarked were a "monster of resources", the composer began to think along the lines of an opera or rather a musica per dramma without any visual, stage dimension. In short, a drama in music—"the tragedy of listening"—the subtitle a comment on consumerism today. Hence, in the vocal parts the most simple intervalic procedures (mainly fourths and fifths) resonate amidst a tapestry of harsh, dissonant, microtonal writing for the ensembles.

Prometeo is perhaps the ultimate realisation of Nono's "theatre of consciousness"—here, an invisible theatre in which the production of sound and its projection in space become fundamental to the overall dramaturgy. The architect Renzo Piano designed an enormous 'wooden boat' structure for the première at San Lorenzo church in Venice, whose acoustics must to some extent be reconstructed for each performance. (For the Japanese première at the Akiyoshidai Festival (Shuho), the new concert hall was named 'Prometeo Hall' in Nono's honour, and designed by leading architect Arata Isozaki). The libretto incorporates disparate texts by Hesiod, Hölderlin, and Benjamin (mostly logistically inaudible during performance due to Nono's characteristic deconstruction), which explore the origin and evolution of humanity, as compiled and expanded by Cacciari. In Nono's timeless and visionary context, music and sound predominate over the image and the written word to form new dimensions of meaning and "new possibilities" for listening.

Caminantes, no hay caminos, hay que caminar

In 1985, Nono came across this aphorism ("Travellers, there are no trails – all there is, is travelling") on a wall of the Franciscan monastery near Toledo, Spain, and it played an important role in the rest of his compositions. As Andrew Clements writes about this aphorism in The Guardian, "It seemed to the composer the perfect expression of his own creative development, and in the last three years of his life he composed a trilogy of works whose titles all derive from that inscription."

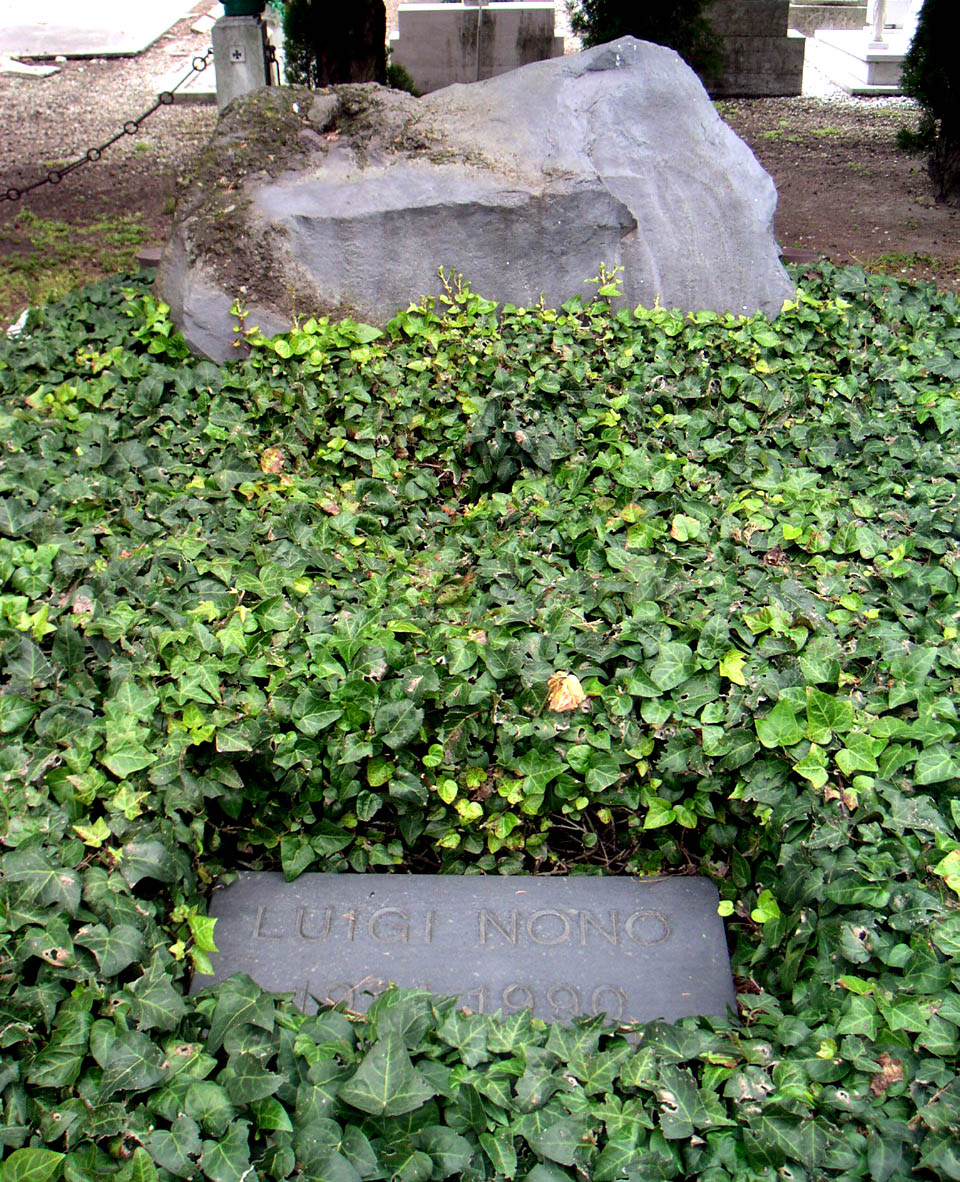
Grave of Nono in the San Michele Cemetery, Venice

Nono's last pieces, such as Caminantes... Ayacucho (1986–87), inspired by a region in southern Peru that experiences extreme poverty and social unrest, La lontananza nostalgica utopica futura (1988–89), and "Hay que caminar" soñando (1989), offer comment on the composer's lifelong quest for political renewal and social justice.

Nono died in Venice in 1990. After his funeral, the German composer Dieter Schnebel remarked that he "was a very great man"—a sentiment widely shared by those who knew him, and those who have come to admire his music. Nono is buried in the San Michele cemetery on the Isola di San Michele, alongside other artists like Stravinsky, Diaghilev, Zoran Mušič and Ezra Pound.

Perhaps the three most important collections of Nono's writings on music, art, and politics (Texte: Studien zu seiner Musik (1975), Ecrits (1993), and Scritti e colloqui (2001)), as well as the texts collected in Restagno, have yet to be translated into English. Other admirers include architect Daniel Libeskind and novelist Umberto Eco (Das Nonoprojekt), for Nono totally reconstructed music and engaged in the most fundamental issues with regards to its expressivity.

The Luigi Nono Archives were established in 1993, through the efforts of Nuria Schoenberg Nono, for the purpose of housing and conserving the Luigi Nono legacy.

== Recordings ==
- Nono, Luigi. 1972. Canti di vita d'amore/Per Bastiana/Omaggio a Vedova. Slavka Taskova, soprano; Loren Driscoll, tenor; Saarländisches Rundfunk Sinfonie-Orchester; Radio-Symphonie-Orchester Berlin; Michael Gielen, cond. Wergo LP WER 60 067. Reissued in 1993 on CD, WER 6229/286 229.
- Nono, Luigi. 1977. Como una ola de fuerza y luz; Epitaffio no. 1, Epitaffio no. 3. Ursula Reinhardt-Kiss, soprano; Giuseppe La Licata, piano; Rundfunk-Sinfonie-Orchester Leipzig; Herbert Kegel, conductor. Roswitha Trexler, soprano, speaker; Werner Haseleu, baritone, speaker; Rundfunkchor Leipzig; Rundfunk-Sinfonie-Orchester Leipzig; Horst Neumann, conductor. Eterna LP 8 26 912. Reissued 1994, Berlin Classics 0021412BC.
- Nono, Luigi. 1986. Fragmente—Stille, an Diotima. LaSalle Quartet (Walter Levin and Henry Meyer, violins; Peter Kamnitzer, viola; Lee Fiser, cello). Deutsche Grammophon/PolyGram CD 415 513, reissued in 1993 as 437 720.
- Nono, Luigi. 1988. Il canto sospeso (with Arnold Schoenberg, Moses und Aaron act 1, scene 1, and Bruno Maderna, Hyperion). Ilse Hollweg, soprano; Eva Bornemann, alto; Friedrich Lenz, tenor; Orchestra and Chorus of WDR Cologne (Bernhard Zimmermann, chorus master); Bruno Maderna, conductor. La Nuova Musica 1. Stradivarius STR 10008.
- Nono, Luigi. 1988. Como una ola de fuerza y luz/Contrappunto dialettico alla mente/... sofferte onde serene .... Slavka Taskova (soprano), Maurizio Pollini (piano), Bavarian Radio Symphony Orchestra, Claudio Abbado, cond. Deutsche Grammophon/PolyGram 423 248. First and third works reissued 2003 (together with Manzoni's Masse: Omaggio a Edgard Varèse) on Deutsche Grammophon/Universal Classics 471 362.
- Nono, Luigi. 1990. Variazioni canoniche; A Carlo Scarpa, architetto ai suoi infiniti possibili; No hay caminos, hay que caminar. Œuvre du XX^{e} siècle. Astrée CD E 8741. [France]: Astrée. Reissued, Montaigne CD MO782132. [France]: Auvidis/Naïve, 2000.
- Nono, Luigi. 1991. A Pierre, dell'azzurro silenzio, inquietum; Quando stanno morendo, diario polacco 2º; Post-prae-ludium per Donau. Roberto Fabricciani, flute; Ciro Sarponi, clarinet; Ingrid Ade, Monika Bayr-Ivenz, Monika Brustmann, sopranos; Susanne Otto, alto; Christine Theus, cello; Roberto Cecconi, conductor; Giancarlo Schiaffini, tuba; Alvise Vidolin, live electronics. Dischi Ricordi CRMCD 1003.
- Nono, Luigi. 1992. Il canto sospeso (with Mahler, Kindertotenlieder and "Ich bin der Welt abhanden gekommen" from the Rückert-Lieder). Barbara Bonney, soprano; Susanne Otto, mezzo-soprano; Marek Torzewski, tenor; Susanne Lothar and Bruno Ganz, reciters; Berlin Radio Choir; Berlin Philharmonic; Claudio Abbado, conductor. Sony Classical/SME SK 53360.
- Nono, Luigi. 1992. La lontananza nostalgica utopica futura, Hay que caminar'—soñando. Gidon Kremer and Tatiana Grindenko, violins. Deutsche Grammophon/Universal Classics 474 326.
- Nono, Luigi. 1992. Memento, romance de la guardia civil española (Epitaffio n. 3 per Federico García Lorca); Composizione per orchestra; España en el corazón; Composizione per orchestra n. 2 (Diario polacca); Per Bastiana. Sinfonie Orchester und Chor des Norddeutschen Rundfunks; Orchestra Sinfonica e Coro di Roma della RAI; Sinfonie Orchester des Bayerischen Rundfunks; Bruno Maderna, conductor. Maderna Edition 17. Arkadia CDCDMAD 027.1.
- Luigi, Nono. 1994. Luigi Nono 1: Fragmente—Stille, an Diotima; "Hay que caminar" soñando. Arditti String Quartet; Irvine Arditti and David Alberman, violins. Arditti Quartet Edition 7. Montaigne MO 7899005.
- Luigi, Nono. 1995. Intolleranza 1960. Ursula Koszut, Kathryn Harries, sopranos; David Rampy, Jerrold van der Schaaf, tenors; Wolfgang Probst, baritone; supporting soloists; Chor der Staatsoper Stuttgart; Staatsorchester Stuttgart; Bernhard Kontarsky, conductor. Notes by Klaus Zehelein. Teldec/WEA Classics 4509–97304.
- Nono, Luigi. 1995. Prometeo. Soloists, Solistenchor Freiburg (chorus master André Richard), Ensemble Modern, conducted by Ingo Metzmacher. Experimentalstudio der Heinrich-Strobel Stiftung des Südwestfunks Freiburg, sound directors André Richard, Hans Peter Haller, Rudolf Strauß, and Roland Breitenfeld. With notes, "Prometeo—Tragedia dell'ascolto", and "Prometeo—Ein Hörleitfaden", by Jürg Stenzl. EMI Classics 7243 5 55209 2 0/CDC 55209.
- Nono, Luigi. 1998. Polifonica—monodia—ritmica; Canti per tredeci; Canciones a Guiomar; "Hay que caminar" soñando. Ensemble UnitedBerlin; Angelika Luz, soprano; United Voices; Peter Hirsch, conductor. Wergo WER 6631/286 631.
- Nono, Luigi. 2000. Orchestral Works and Chamber Music. SWF Symphony Orchestra; Hans Rosbaud and Michael Gielen, conductors; Moscow String Quartet. Programme notes by Wolfgang Löscher. Col Legno WWE 20505.
- Nono, Luigi. 2000. Variazioni canoniche/A Carlo Scarpa, architetto, ai suoi infiniti possibili/No hay caminos, hay que caminar...Andrei Tarkovski. SW German Radio Symphony Orchestra, Michael Gielen, cond. Naïve 782132.
- Nono, Luigi. 2001. Al gran sole carico d'amore. Vocal soloists and chorus of the Staatsoper Stuttgart; Staatsorchester Stuttgart; Lothar Zagrosek, conductor. With notes, "Stories—Luigi Nono's 'Theatre of Consciousness'—Al Gran sole carico d'amore," by Jürg Stenzl. Teldec New Line/Warner Classics 8573–81059–2.
- Nono, Luigi. 2001. Choral Works: Cori di Didone; Da un diario italiano; Das atmende Klarsein. SWR Vokalensemble Stuttgart; Rupert Huber, conductor. Faszination Musik. Hänssler Classic 93.022.
- Nono, Luigi. 2001. Variazioni canoniche sulla serie dell' op. 41 di A. Schönberg; Varianti; No hay caminos, hay que caminar—Andrej Tarkowskij; Incontri. Col Legno WWE 1CD 31822. Mark Kaplan, violin. Sinfonieorchester Basel, Mario Venzago, cond. [Munich]: Col Legno.
- Nono, Luigi. 2004. Io, frammento da Prometeo, Das atmende Klarsein. Katia Plaschka, Petra Hoffmann, Monika Bair-Ivenz, Roberto Fabbriciani, Ciro Scarponi; Solistenchor Freiburg, Experimentalstudio Freiburg, André Richard. col legno 2 SACD 20600 (Helikon Harmonia Mundi).
- Nono, Luigi. 2006. 20 Jahre Inventionen V: Quando stanno morendo. Diario polacco n. 2; Canciones a Guiomar; Omaggio a Emilio Vedova. Ingrid Ade, Monika Bar-Ivenz, Halina Nieckarz, sopranos; Bernadette Manca di Nissa, alto; Roberto Fabbriciani, bass flute; Frances-Marie Uitti, violoncello; Arturo Tamayo, conductor; Experimentalstudio der Heinrich Strobel Stiftung; Luigi Nono, Hans Peter Haller, sound direction; Rudolf Strauss, Bernd Noll, technicians; Alvise Vidolin, assistant (Quando stanno morendo); Eldegard Neubert-Imm, soprano; Ars Nova Ensemble Berlin; Peter Schwartz, conductor (Canciones a Guiomar); tape (Omaggio a Emilio Vedova). Edition RZ 4006.
- Nono, Luigi. 2020. "Hay que caminar" soñando. Duo Gelland, Cecilia and Martin Gelland, violins. nosag records Sweden 240.
