= Giacomo Manzoni (composer) =

Italian composer (born 1932)

Giacomo Manzoni (born 26 September 1932) is an Italian composer.

He was born in Milan and studied composition from 1948 in Messina with Gino Contilli, and continued his studies from 1950 to 1956 at the Milan Conservatory. In 1955 he obtained a doctorate in foreign languages from the Bocconi University in Milan. He taught on the faculty of the Conservatorio Giovanni Battista Martini in Bologna.

He wrote the music for the film Malina (1991).
