= Heinrich Strobel (musicologist) =

German musicologist (1898–1970)

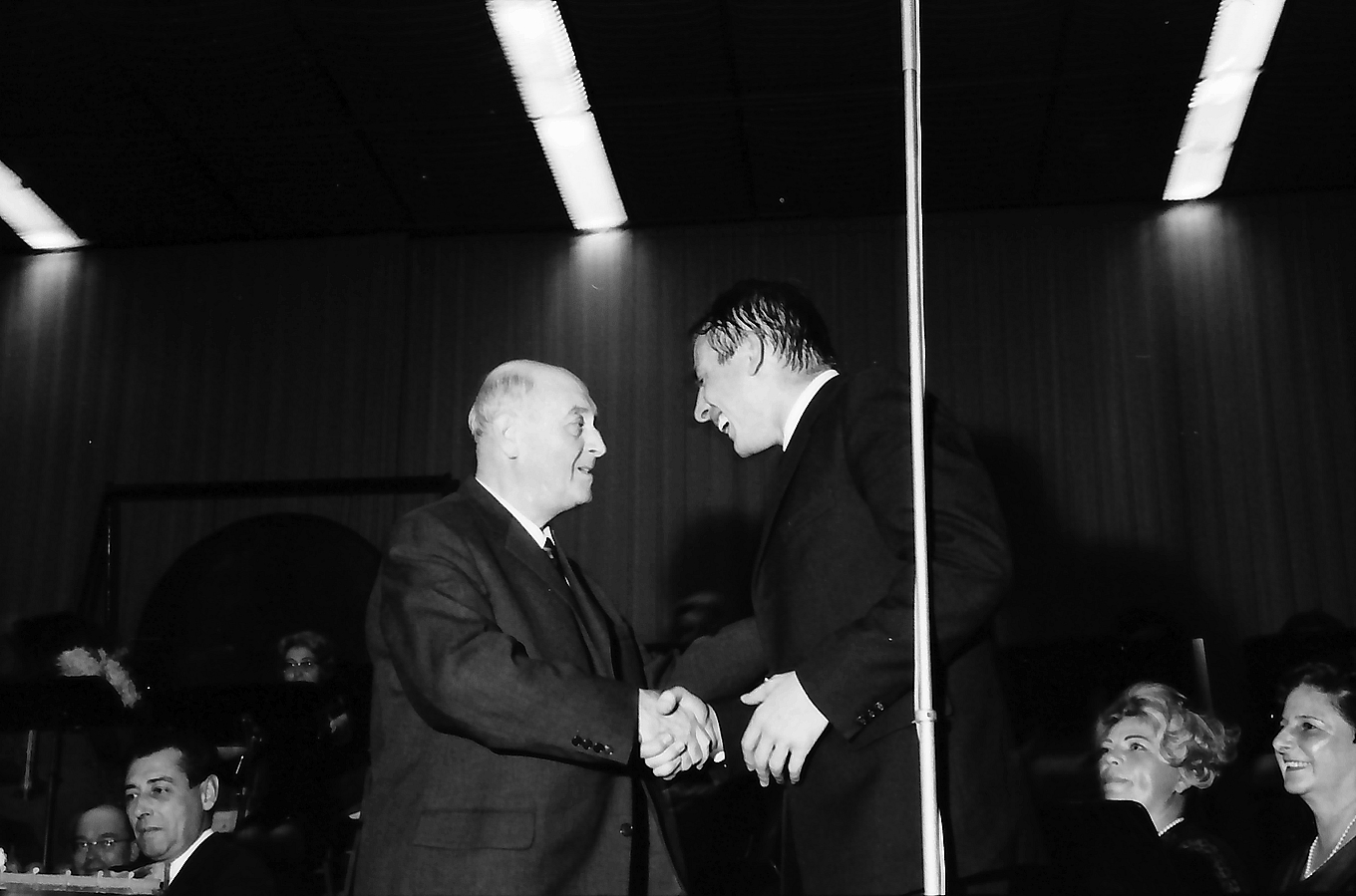
Strobel and Karlheinz Stockhausen, Donaueschingen Festival 1965

Heinrich Strobel (31 May 1898 – 18 August 1970) was a German musicologist.

== Life ==
Born in Regensburg as a son of a wholesale merchant, Strobel attended the grammar-school in there, took part in the First World War and worked from 1918 at the municipal theatre in Regensburg as répétiteur. After that he studied musicology at the Ludwig-Maximilians-Universität München with Adolf Sandberger und Theodor Kroyer. In 1921, he became music critic of the Thüringer Allgemeine in Erfurt. In 1922, he graduated to the degree of Doctor of Philosophy (D. Phil.) with his dissertation on Johann Wilhelm Häßler's life and work.

From 1927 to 1932, he was occupied as music critic with the Berliner Börsen-Courier. In 1933 and 1934, he was on the editorial staff of the journal for Neue Musik Melos and for the successor journal Neues Musikblatt. From 1934 to 1938, he worked for the Berliner Tageblatt, for which, under the pseudonym Karl Frahm, he also wrote cookery recipes and a cookery book. In 1935 he was denounced as a 'Music-Bolshevist' by the Militant League for German Culture. Because Strobel married Hilda Levy, designated a 'Jewess' by the racialist Nuremberg Laws, in his second marriage, he received a special permit for publication from the Nazi regime. From 1 February 1939, he worked for the Deutsche Allgemeine Zeitung, from April 1939 as foreign correspondent in Paris, and during the period of the German occupation. In 1940 he published a biography of Claude Debussy for the Zurich publisher Atlantis Verlag (founded by Martin Hürlimann). Under a pseudonym he also wrote for a supplement of Goebbels's newspaper Das Reich. Strobel, who at first was called up for the military reserve, was drafted into the Landsturm after the Allied Invasion of northern France in Summer 1944, and became a prisoner of war in the Liberation of Paris.

After the Second World War (December 1945) Strobel was employed by the newly founded Südwestrundfunk (SWR) (the broadcasting authority in Rheinland-Pfalz) in Baden-Baden, where he became leader of the music department. From 1956 to 1969 he was president of the International Society for Contemporary Music.

Strobel died on 18 August 1970 in Baden-Baden at the age of 72.

== Works ==
Strobel championed New Music right from the start of his work as a music critic. In this way he took up the cause of the works of Paul Hindemith, Igor Stravinsky, Kurt Weill and Ernst Krenek. His biography of Hindemith was published in 1928 by Schott Music. As Leader of the Music Department of the SWR he employed the conductors Hans Rosbaud and Ernest Bour, under whose direction the Südwestrundfunk (SWR) Symphony Orchestra became a pre-eminent Ensemble in the field of New Music. He promoted very many young talents, among them the composers Pierre Boulez, Karlheinz Stockhausen, and Krzysztof Penderecki. From 1947 he was publisher-editor of Melos. The revival of the Donaueschingen Festival in the early 1950s was effectively owing to his initiative. There, too, were generally first presented the debut performances of very numerous compositions which the SWR presented at his instigation. These presentations included most notably Hans Werner Henze, Wolfgang Fortner, Bernd Alois Zimmermann, Luigi Nono, Werner Egk and many other exponents of New Music.

He wrote the libretti for three operas of Rolf Liebermann, namely, Leonore 40/45 (1952), Penelope (1954) and Die Schule der Frauen (1955).

The Heinrich Strobel Foundation and the Experimental Studio of the Heinrich Strobel Foundation of the Südwestrundfunk are named after him.

== Awards ==
- 1952: Arnold Schönberg Medal
- 1957: Cross of the Légion d'Honneur (Knight)
- 1961: Doctor of Philosophy (honoris causa) in the University of Basel
