= San Lorenzo, Venice =

Church in Venice, Italy

San Lorenzo
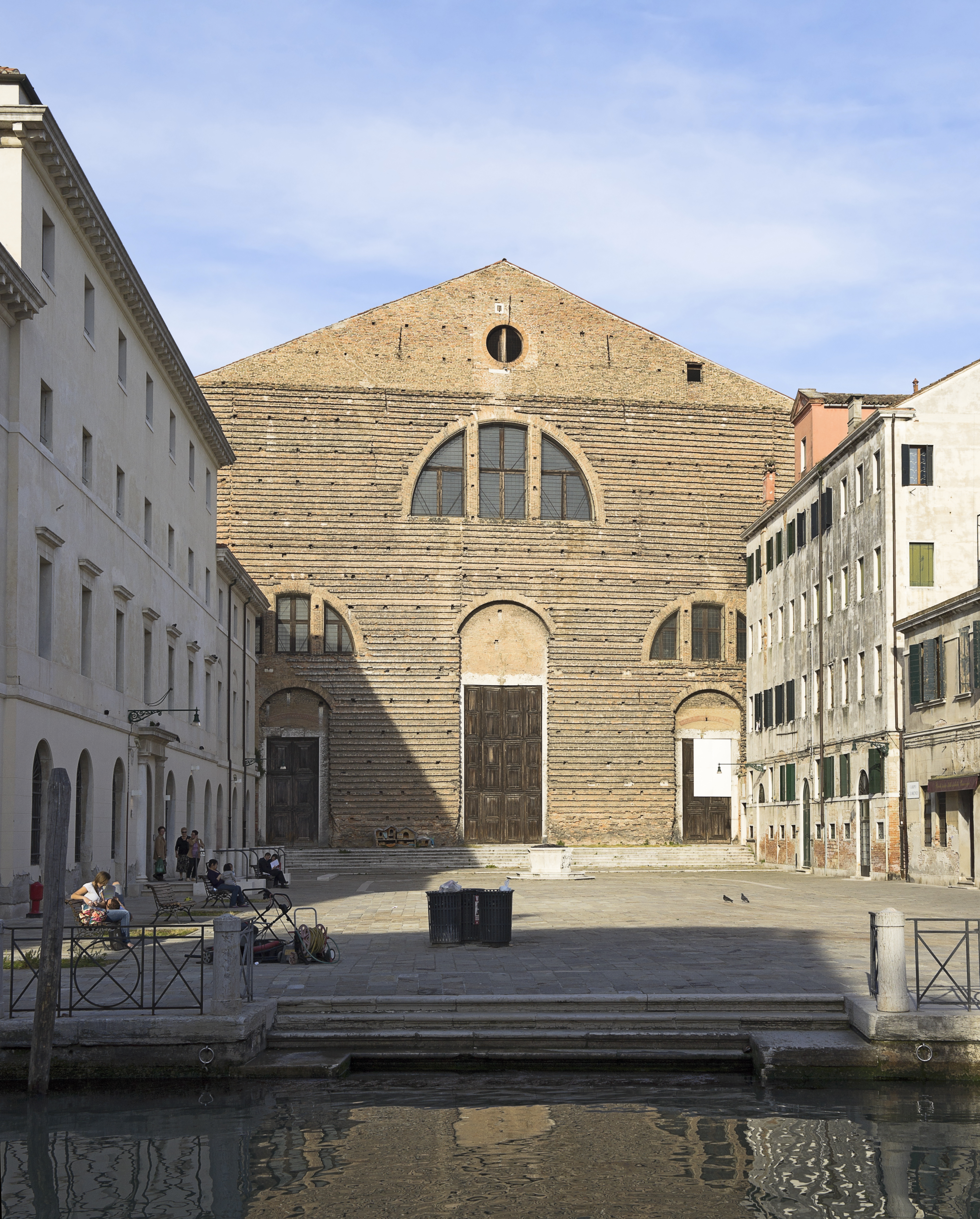
- San Lorenzo di Venezia

- Location within Venice Location within Italy

Religion
- Affiliation: Roman Catholic
- Province: Venice

Location
- Location: Venice, Italy 45°26′14″N 12°20′44″E
- Interactive map of San Lorenzo

Architecture
- Completed: 9th century

San Lorenzo is a church building in the sestiere of Castello of Venice, northern Italy.

The church dates to the 9th century, and became attached to the neighboring Benedictine monastery. It was rebuilt in 1580–1616 to designs by Simone Sorela. The high altar was partially sculpted by Giovanni Maria da Cannaregio using designs by Girolamo Campagna. The latter sculptor completed the statues of Saints Lawrence and Sebastian. Marco Polo was buried there, per his request on his deathbed. His remains had been in the chapel of St. Sebastian, which was demolished in 1580. Since then there has been no information regarding the whereabouts of his remains, which are consequently missing.

Saint Paul I of Constantinople relics were brought to Venice in 1226. They are currently kept in San Lorenzo.

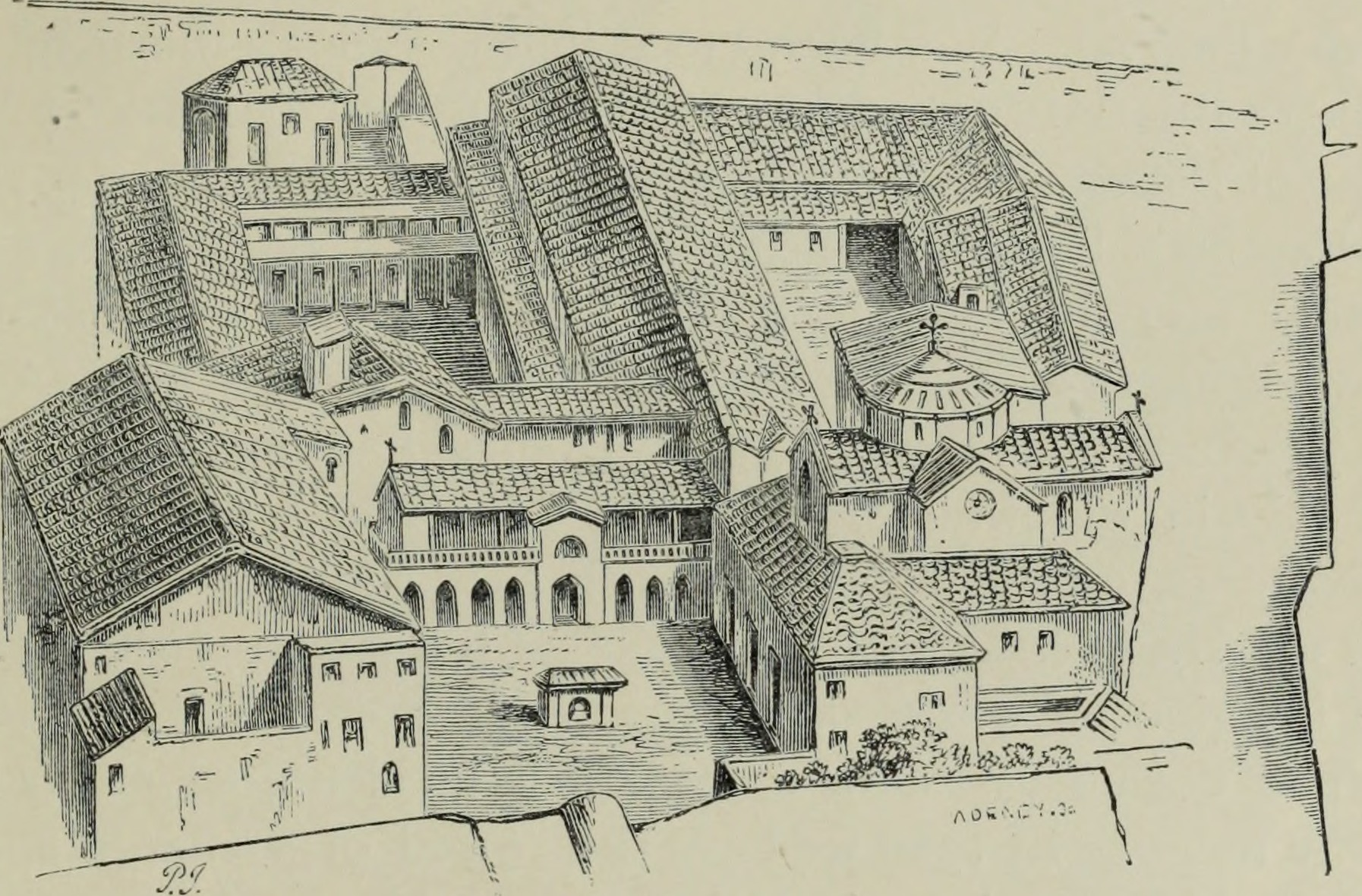
San Lorenzo as it was in the 15th century
