= Como una ola de fuerza y luz =

Composition by Luigi Nono

- by Luigi Nono
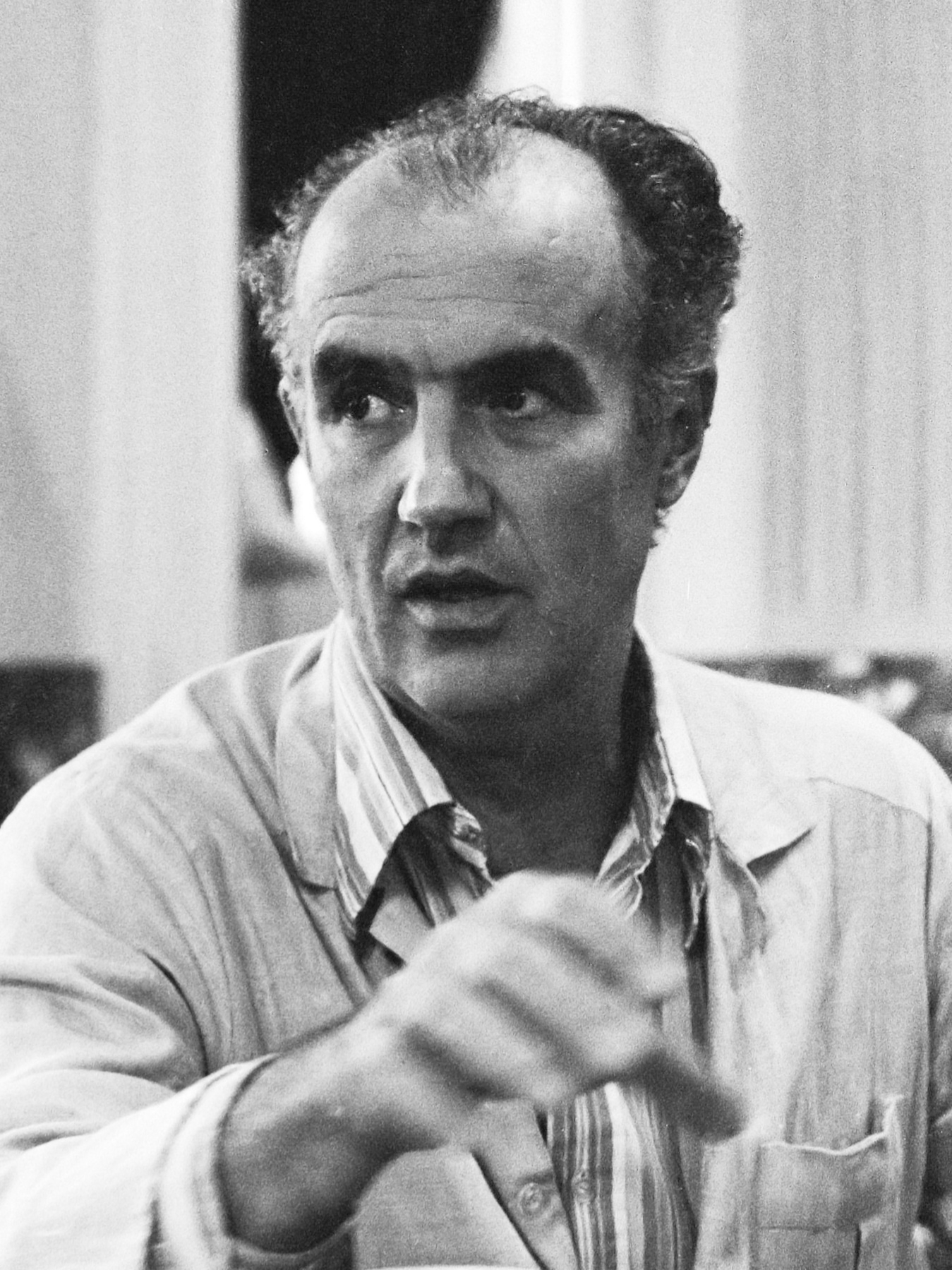
- Luigi Nono
- Time: 5/4
- Composed: 1972
- Published: Ricordi
- Duration: 30:05
- Movements: 1
- Scoring: Soprano, piano, orchestra, and magnetic tape

Premiere
- Date: June 26, 1972
- Location: Teatro alla Scala
- Conductor: Claudio Abbado
- Performers: La Scala Theatre Orchestra; Maurizio Pollini; Slavka Taskova

Como una ola de fuerza y luz (Spanish for Like a wave of strength and light) is a composition for soprano, piano, orchestra, and magnetic tape by Italian composer Luigi Nono. It was composed between 1971 and 1972 and was Nono's first attempt at giving the piano a leading role in a composition.

== Composition ==
Luigi Nono's political allegiance was present throughout much of his artistic production. A member of the Italian Communist Party since 1952, he took part in practical political and cultural work all throughout the 60s and 70s. This commitment and a collaboration with pianist Maurizio Pollini and conductor Claudio Abbado led to the composition of this piece. Even though Nono had known Pollini since September, 1966 and Nono was already a household name in avant-garde classical music, it was not until September 1971 that he would start working with Pollini on his first composition for piano, because Nono thought Pollini's piano skills and musicality to be "very fascinating."

Some time after starting the project, he learned about the accidental death of Chilean left activist Luciano Cruz, one of the young leaders of the Movement of the Revolutionary Left. Nono had come to know Cruz in Santiago de Chile in June of that year and built a strong friendship with him. For this reason, Nono decided to expand the first draft of the composition and added a soprano voice with some of the lines of a poem by Argentine poet Julio Huasi.

This composition was finished in 1972 and premiered at the Teatro alla Scala in Milan on June 28, 1972. Claudio Abbado conducted the La Scala Theatre Orchestra, with Maurizio Pollini at the piano and Slavka Taskova as the soprano. The original tape for the composition was realized months before at the Studio di fonologia musicale di Radio Milano, with sound technician Maurizio Zuccheri under the Nono's supervision and direction. The score was published that year in facsimile by Ricordi. It was dedicated to "Luciano Cruz para vivir" (Spanish for "That Luciano Cruz may live").

== Structure ==
Como una ola de fuerza y luz is a composition in one movement, even though Nono specified at least two sung segments in the score. The composition should have a duration of exactly 30 minutes and 5 seconds, since the orchestra is supposed to follow the indications and the timing in the tape. It has often been described as a secular requiem or as an epitaph (even by Nono himself). However, Nono rejected the notion of it being a triple concerto for soprano, piano, and tape.

The composition is scored for four flutes, four piccolos, four oboes, four clarinets, two bass clarinets, four bassoons, two contrabassoons, six horns, four trumpets, three trombones, two contrabass trombones, one tuba, two percussionists playing the timpani, two more playing the bass drum, and two more playing the tam-tam; a harp, amplified by a contact microphone placed on the soundboard, the loud speaker located near the harp; a solo piano, amplified from the 23-minute-and-38-second mark by a microphone placed under the piano, the loudspeaker placed separate from the piano; a soprano, a large string section consisting of 12 first violins, 12 second violins, 12 violas, 12 violoncelli, 12 doublebasses, and a four-channel tape machine, located halfway down, or almost at the back, of the hall.

Since some instruments are meant to be amplified, up to five loudspeakers are needed, with at least 100 watts each, placed behind the orchestra in a rainbow shape. Four of them are situated from left to right at an equal distance, except for speakers two and three. The piano loudspeaker is placed in the center.

The piece has a steady tempo in 5/4 at ♩ = 60, meaning each bar lasts five seconds. Even though the movement separation is not clear, Nono left some specifications in the original score. The composition starts with a small introduction by the winds, the tape and the violins, which fades out after the two minute mark. The first numbered section starts at 2:30, marked Interno dolce and features the soprano singing "Luciano" with the tape. The second numbered section starts at 4:15, marked Duro deciso, and with the incipit "En los vientos azarosos de esta tierra..." (Spanish for "In the ever-changing winds of this country"). This section also features the soprano and the tape only, and ends at 6:30 with the piano entry, marked "Suono duro – Poco pedale sempre" in the score.

Though unnumbered, the next soprano entry is generally considered the third section, starting with the text "Voces de niños doblen campanas dulces" (Spanish for "Voices of children accompany gentle bells"), but this section is not separated by a double bar nor does it include a tempo marking. This time, the soprano and the tape are joined by the piano. After the tape slowly fades out, the brass entry at 15:30 marks the start of what Nono himself called the "'long march', from the low to the high register: 'highest tension'". The piece ends with a succession of "waves" full of tone clusters followed by the tape reminiscing the prologue and the central part while it slowly fades out. Nono specified that the tape can end either at 29:03, 29:18 or 30:04.

== Notable recordings ==
The following is a list of notable performances of this composition:

Conductor	Orchestra	Piano	Soprano	Label	Year of recording
Claudio Abbado	Bavarian Radio Symphony Orchestra	Maurizio Pollini	Slavka Taskova	Deutsche Grammophon	1973
Herbert Kegel	MDR Leipzig Radio Symphony Orchestra	Giuseppe La Licata	Ursula Reinhardt-Kiss	Berlin Classics	1976
Michael Gielen	Southwest German Radio Symphony Orchestra	Stefan Litwin	Eirian Davies	Col Legno	1998
Peter Rundel	WDR Symphony Orchestra Cologne	Jan Michiels	Claudia Barainsky	Kairos	2012
