= Arturo Tamayo =

Spanish conductor

Arturo Tamayo Ballesteros (born 3 August 1946) is a Spanish conductor and music teacher.

== Life ==
Tamayo studied music at the Real Conservatorio Superior de Música de Madrid, while studying Law at the Complutense University of Madrid. He finally opted for music and finished his studies with an honorary prize in composition. He completed his training outside Spain in Basel with Pierre Boulez and in Vienna with Witold Rowicki. He also studied composition with Klaus Huber and Wolfgang Fortner at the Hochschule für Musik Freiburg.

Between 1979 and 1998 he worked as a music teacher at the Conservatory of Freiburg im Breisgau. He combined his teaching activity as a guest conductor in several large European orchestras, including the Orchestre National de France, the Luxembourg Philharmonic Orchestra, the Accademia Nazionale di Santa Cecilia or the Berlin Radio Symphony Orchestra, and in various music festivals, including the Salzburg festival, Lucerne Festival, London, Venice or the Autumn Festival in Paris.

He then settled in Spain, where he is a professor of advanced music at the Universidad de Alcalá de Henares and has conducted in the most prominent theatres and auditoriums such as the Teatro Real de Madrid or the Teatro de la Zarzuela. He has premiered pieces by Huber himself, Sylvano Bussotti and Iannis Xenakis, among others, and almost all the work of the Spanish composer, José Luis de Delás. Besides Spain, Germany and Austria, as an opera conductor he has performed in other European capitals such as London (Covent Garden), the Paris Opera and La Fenice in Venice.

An academic of the Real Academia de Bellas Artes de Nuestra Señora de las Angustias, he was awarded in 2002 the Premio Nacional de Música.
