= Studio di fonologia musicale di Radio Milano =

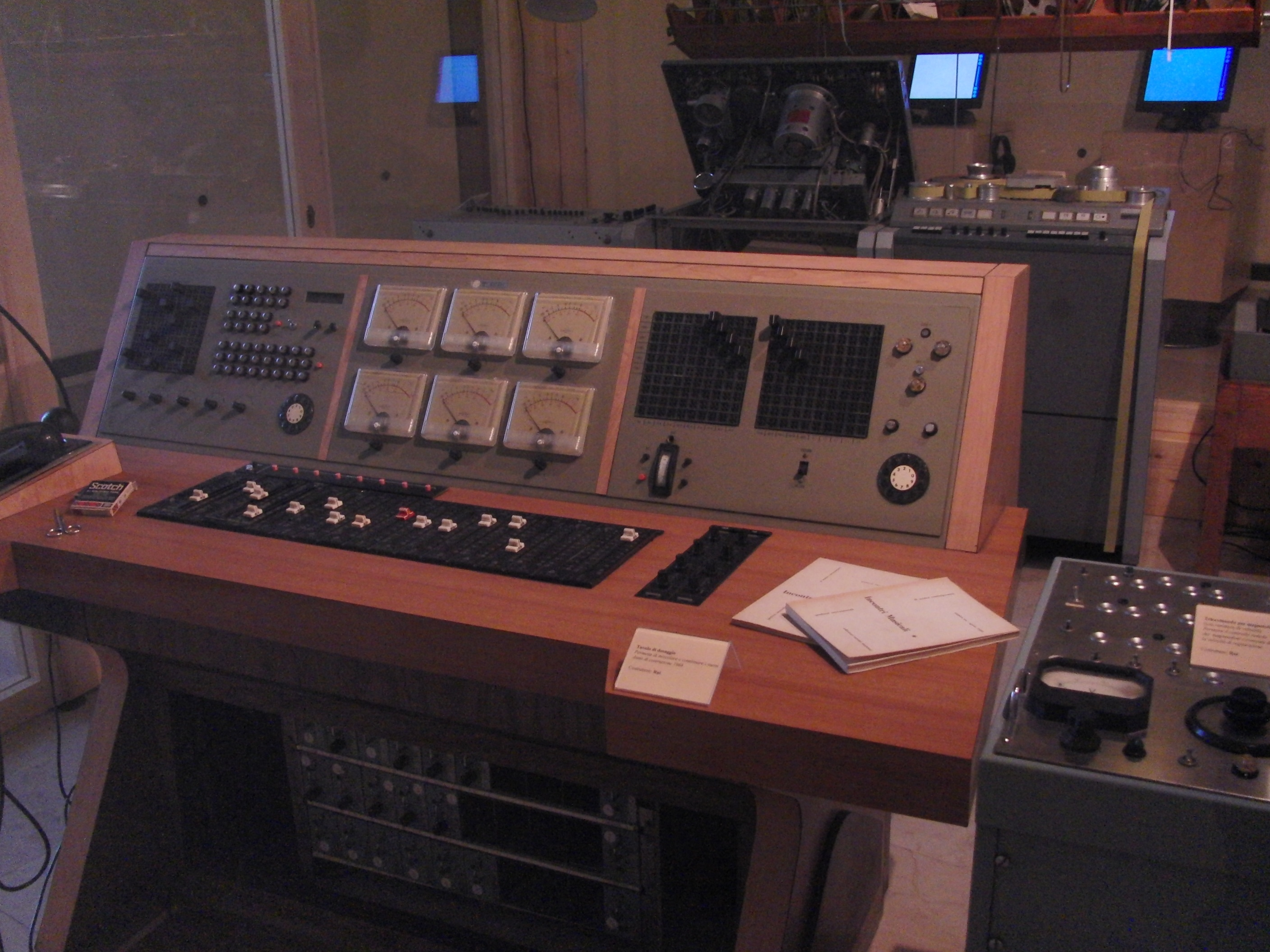
Audio console

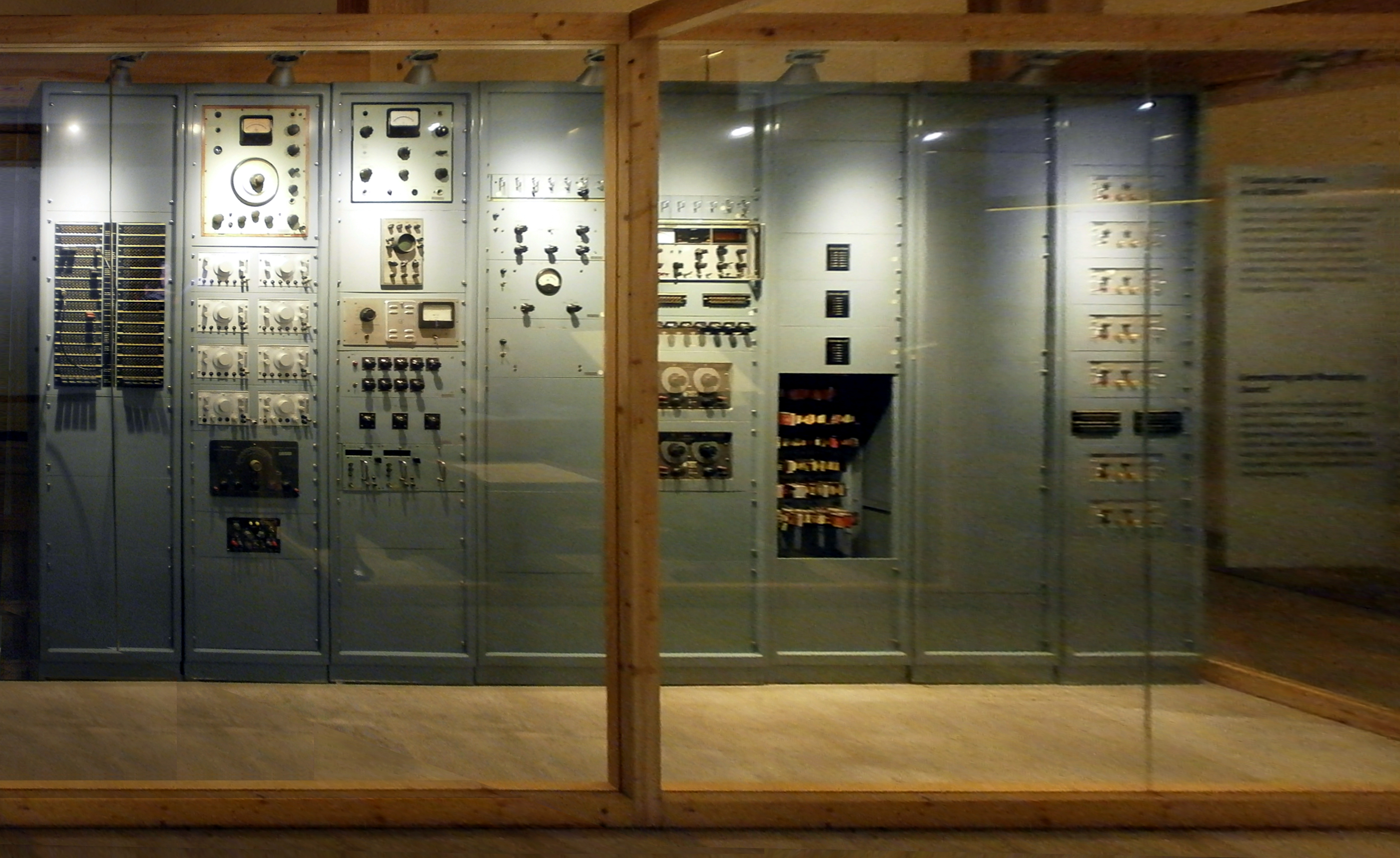
Synthesizer

The Studio di fonologia musicale di Radio Milano was established 1955 in Milan following a joint initiative by Luciano Berio and Bruno Maderna.

The aim was to create a third European facility for experimental electronic contemporary classical music after the Studio für elektronische Musik des WDR in Cologne and the Groupe de Recherches Musicales in Paris.

The studio closed on 28 February 1983. The refurbished equipment is now exhibited at the Museum of Musical Instruments in the Sforza Castle, Milan.
