= Marco Fusi (violinist) =

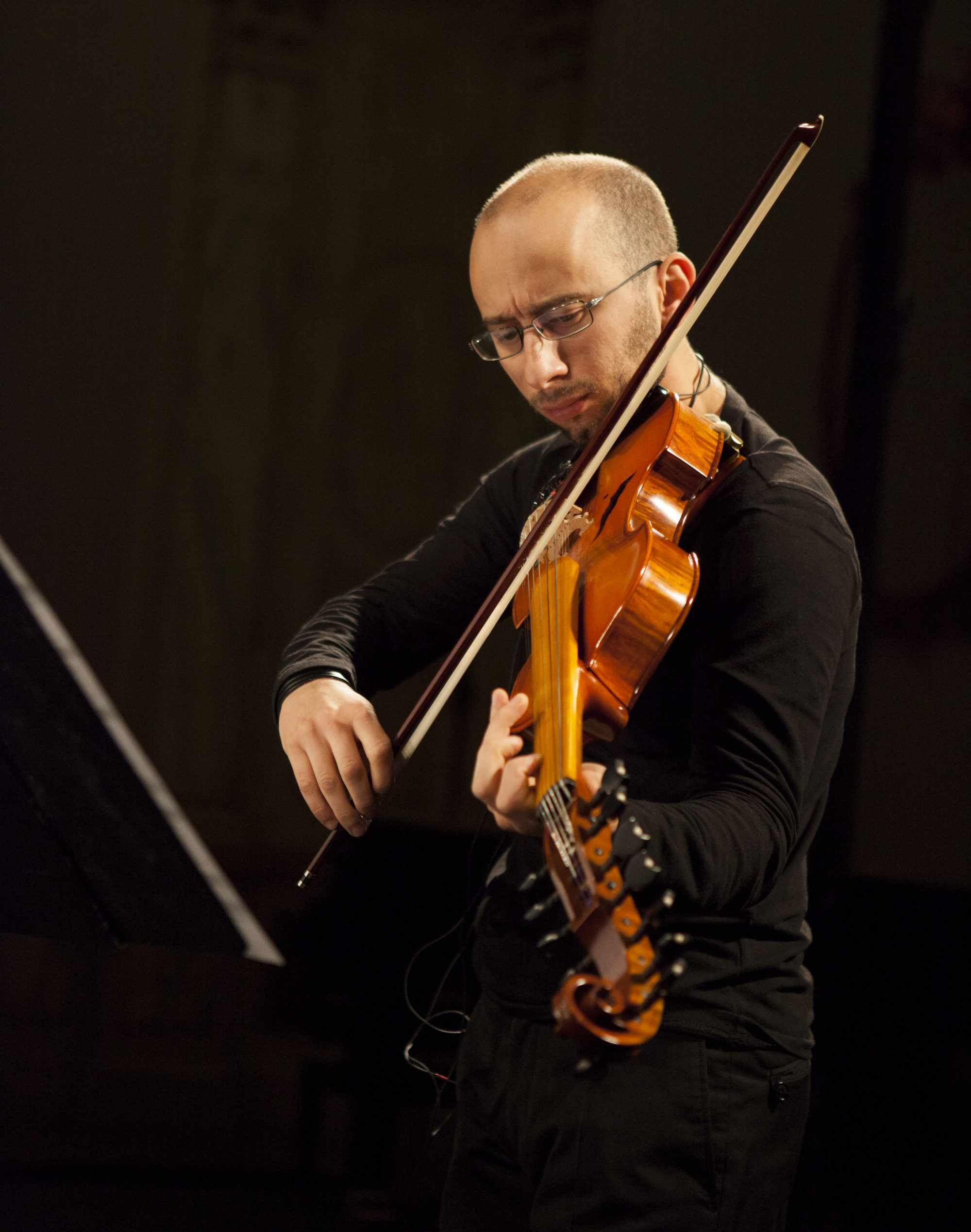
- Marco Fusi playing viola d'amore

Background information
- Instruments: Violin, viola, viola d'amore
- Years active: 2000–present
- Labels: Kairos, Stradivarius
- Website: marcofusi.net

Marco Fusi is an Italian violinist, violist and viola d'amore player.

== Biography ==
Fusi is best known as an interpreter of contemporary classical music. His repertoire encompasses modern and contemporary works for solo instrument, instrument and live electronics, and instrument and ensemble.

Fusi graduated in violin performance (MA, 2003) and composition (MA, 2007) from the Milan Conservatory, and continued with his doctoral studies at the Orpheus Institute of Ghent and at the Royal Conservatoire of Antwerp. His artistic research focuses on the role of the interpreter in contemporary music, the composer-performer creative collaboration, and the impact of musical instruments in the creation of new musical works. As a violinist, Fusi has been a member of the Lucerne Festival Academy from 2007 till 2011, working with Pierre Boulez, Alan Gilbert, Péter Eötvös and Susanna Mälkki.

Between 2009 and 2013 Fusi recorded and frequently performed the complete cycle of John Cage's Freeman Etudes for solo violin.

In 2014, Fusi uncovered an unperformed work for violin and piano by Giacinto Scelsi, Divertimento N. 1, preserved within the archives of the Scelsi Foundation of Rome. This rediscovered work was premiered by Fusi, together with pianist Anna D'Errico, at the Royal Conservatoire of Antwerp in January 2019, and their recording is included in the Scelsi Collection, edited by the Scelsi Foundation. From February 2022 Fusi teaches at the Conservatorio Antonio Vivaldi di Alessandria.

Fusi performs on violin and viola with notable international ensembles including Klangforum Wien, MusikFabrik, Ensemble Linea, Mivos Quartet, Meitar Ensemble under conductors such as Johannes Kalitzke, Pierre-André Valade, Sylvain Cambreling and Elena Schwarz.

== Collaborations with composers ==
Fusi's notable collaborations have resulted in new works written for Fusi by Pierluigi Billone, Christopher Trapani, Jessie Marino, Bára Gisladottir, Alessandro Perini, Johan Svensson, Dominique Schafer, among others.

Since 2009, Fusi has continuously worked with Italian composer Pierluigi Billone. Their collaboration has resulted in the creation of a new work for solo violin, Equilibrio.Cerchio, written for and dedicated to Marco Fusi. Equilibrio.Cerchio was premiered by Fusi in 2015, and subsequently performed in Europe, USA, Argentina, the UK and Australia. Fusi recorded Equilibrio.Cerchio, together with other solo works by Billone, for Kairos in 2017. In 2020 Fusi and Billone worked together on a performance of Luigi Nono's La lontananza nostalgica utopica futura, presented by the Ensemble Vide in Geneva. Fusi and Billone collaborate also in workshops and masterclasses in academic institutions, such as Boston University and Koninklijk Conservatorium Brussel.

In 2015, Fusi was invited to perform Helmut Lachenmann's Toccatina for solo violin at Festival Attacca in Stuttgart during Lachemnann's 80th birthday celebrations.

Other continuous collaborations include that with the Australian composer Charlie Sdraulig, who wrote one to one for Fusi. In this work, the performer sits alone in a confined space with one audience member. The work has been premiered at the Center for Computer Research in Music and Acoustics of Stanford University in 2019, followed by performances at Kalv Festival in Sweden, and for INTIMATE festival in Manchester.

Fusi frequently performs on the viola d'amore and has commissioned new works for the instrument, contributing to the development of its existing repertoire. Fusi has worked with and premiered new viola d'amore pieces by Christopher Trapani, Bára Gísladóttir, Lorenzo Romano, Laura Steenberge, Zeno Baldi, Bergrún Snæbjörnsdóttir, Giovanni Verrando, Julie Zhu, Carlo Ciceri. These new works have been presented by Fusi at Biennale Venice, Stanford University, Dark Music Days Reykjavík, Center for New Music San Francisco, Italian Academy at Columbia University, the Scelsi Museum of Rome.

== Recordings ==
- Luigi Nono: La lontananza nostalgica utopica futura (Kairos, Vienna 2020)
- John Cage: ONE 10 & TWO 6 (Da Vinci records, Tokyo 2019)
- Pierluigi Billone: Equilibrio.Cerchio – ITI.KE.MI (Kairos, Wien 2017)
- Salvatore Sciarrino: Complete works for violin and for viola (Stradivarius, Milan 2017)
- Giacinto Scelsi: Scelsi Collection vol. 7 (Stradivarius, Milan 2017)
- Restoration, Swedish music for viola d'amore (Geiger Grammofon, Gothenburg 2016)
- John Cage: Freeman Etudes books III & IV (Stradivarius, Milan 2012)
- John Cage: Freeman Etudes books I & II (Stradivarius, Milan 2011)
