= Zwei Gefühle =

1992 composition by Helmut Lachenmann

... zwei Gefühle ...
- Musik mit Leonardo
- by Helmut Lachenmann
- Language: German
- Based on: Codex Arundel by Leonardo da Vinci
- Composed: 1991–1992
- Duration: 20 minutes
- Scoring: 2 speakers; ensemble

Premiere
- Date: 9 October 1992
- Location: Stuttgart
- Conductor: Péter Eötvös
- Performers: Ensemble Modern

... zwei Gefühle ... (... Two Feelings ...), subtitled Musik mit Leonardo (Music with Leonardo), is a composition for two speakers and ensemble by Helmut Lachenmann, based on a text by Leonardo da Vinci from the Codex Arundel. Completed in 1992, the work was premiered on 9 October 1992 by Ensemble Modern. Lachenmann later integrated the work into his 1996 opera Das Mädchen mit den Schwefelhölzern. Both compositions have become classics of 20th-century music.

== History ==
Helmut Lachenmann composed ... zwei Gefühle ... in 1991 and 1992, based on a text by Leonardo da Vinci translated into German by Kurt Gerstenberg. The composition was inspired by his teacher Luigi Nono, who had died in 1990; Lachenmann worked on it in Nono's empty house on Sardinia. The work is an example of Lachenmann's musique concrète instrumentale, in which conventional instruments are used in various ways to produce sounds.

The text by da Vinci, which Gerstenberg translated under the title "Verlangen nach Erkenntnis" ('Desire for Knowledge'), first describes the discovery of a cave and then the conflict of the feelings of fear of its threatening danger and the desire to explore the unknown place. Max Nyffeler, reflecting on transcendence in Lachenmann's work, offers three interpretations: the Renaissance quest for scientific knowledge, the observer in front of a cave feeling the unknown beginning to resonate within himself, and a person's longing for freedom and at the same time fear of it.

Lachenmann split the text into particles, which the listener may "decipher"; he expected that "'structurally' oriented listening", as a perception of the sound and its connections, would lead to "inner images and sensations", and that "the possibly laborious recognition and compilation of signs on the one hand, and the power of the emerging message on the other" might "form a closed complex of experience".

The work was first scored for two speakers and an ensemble of flute (also piccolo), cor anglais, clarinet, bassoon, two trumpets, trombone, tuba, two percussionists, guitar, piano and strings. The title is a phrase from within the text. The work was premiered in Stuttgart on 9 October 1992. by the Ensemble Modern conducted by Péter Eötvös. The work was published by Breitkopf, with a given duration of 20 minutes.

Lachenmann later arranged the work for only one speaker with ensemble. The work features an interplay of sound and silence: "The music breaks off, restarts, pauses – a dialogue between sound and silence that subtly challenges the audience."

=== Opera ===
Lachenmann reused the work as part of his opera Das Mädchen mit den Schwefelhölzern (The Little Match Girl), which he created between 1990 and 1996, based on the fairy-tale by Hans Christian Andersen and texts by terrorist Gudrun Ensslin. It was premiered in 1997. In a later version of the opera, written for Tokyo, Lachenmann replaced it by a different setting of the same text that uses five long "noise" orchestral fermatas instead of the instrumental texture, giving more weight to the text.

=== Recording ===
The work was recorded on DVD, in the version for one speaker, alongside other pieces by Lachenmann for piano. It was filmed at Columbia University, with Lachenmann taking the part of the speaker, playing the piano pieces and introducing the works in a short interview.

=== Documentary ===
Uli Aumüller created a documentary film featuring the work played by the chamber ensemble Neue Musik Berlin, from first rehearsals to a performance at the Academy of Arts in Berlin. The film was presented at the Berliner Festspiele in 1998.

=== Legacy ===
The work was performed by several ensembles in 2025 to celebrate Lachenmann's 90th birthday. EnsembleKollektiv Berlin, conducted by Enno Poppe, played it in one of three events in Lachenmann's honour at the Musikfest Berlin 2025. It was included in a long concert at the Hochschule für Musik Carl Maria von Weber, played by members of the university orchestra conducted by Roland Kluttig. Lachenmann was the speaker in a concert in Vienna that included the work on the occasion of Pierluigi Billone, a student of Lachenmann's, receiving the Erste Bank Prize. Performed with Klangforum Wien conducted by Emilio Pomárico, it was broadcast by ORF. Both ... zwei Gefühle ... and Das Mädchen mit den Schwefelhölzern have become classics of 20th-century music.
