= Stéphane Ginsburgh =

Belgian pianist (born 1969)

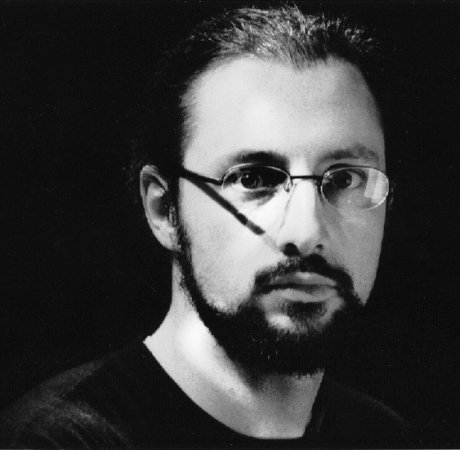
- Ginsburgh in 2004

Background information
- Born: 27 November 1969 (age 56); Brussels, Belgium
- Genres: Contemporary; 20th-century classical; electronic; classical
- Occupations: Musician; composer; educator
- Instruments: Piano; keyboards; percussion
- Years active: 1990s–present
- Labels: Sub Rosa; Cypres Records; Naxos; Kairos
- Website: ginsburgh.net

Stéphane Ginsburgh (born 27 November 1969) is a Belgian pianist of Austrian origin. He is a piano professor at the Geneva University of Music.

== Biography ==
Ginsburgh was born in Brussels. After graduating from the Royal Music Conservatories of Mons and Liège in piano and chamber music, Ginsburgh studied with Paul Badura-Skoda, Vitaly Margulis, and particularly Claude Helffer in Paris for contemporary music and Jerome Lowenthal in New York.

He holds a B.A. in philosophy of science from the Université libre de Bruxelles, an M.M in piano, and a Ph.D. in arts from the Vrije Universiteit Brussel. Since 2022, he is a piano professor at the Geneva University of Music.

Ginsburgh appears regularly in recitals and chamber music in Europe, the Middle East, Russia, and the United States. He performs contemporary music as well as the classical and Romantic repertoires that he often associates into his programs. He collaborates regularly with the Ictus Ensemble. Ginsburgh has performed and premiered pieces by Newton Armstrong, Vykintas Baltakas, Guy Barash, Philippe Boesmans, Renaud De Putter, Jean-Luc Fafchamps, Fabian Fiorini, Alec Hall, Panayiotis Kokoras, Pierre Kolp, György Kurtág, Philipp Maintz, Benoît Mernier, Stefan Prins, André Ristic, Frederic Rzewski, François Sarhan, Sabrina Schroeder, Matthew Shlomowitz, Juan Carlos Tolosa, and David Toub.

He has been awarded the Belgian composers' union prize for his achievements in performing Belgian contemporary music. From 1990 on, Ginsburgh has been a member of the Bureau des Pianistes and since 1991, he participates actively in the Contemporary Music Spring Festival Ars Musica in Brussels. In 1998, he co-founded Le Bureau des Arts, now Sonar, an active group of artists dedicated to different types of artistic expression and creation including music, dance, and literature, which he directed until 2018. He was artistic director of the Centre Henri Pousseur, formerly known as Centre de Recherche et de Formation Musicale de Wallonie and to which he gave its new name, dedicated to electronic music and live electronics from 2010 until 2013.

== Festivals and other activities ==
Ginsburgh has performed at important festivals such as Agora at IRCAM (Paris), Ars Musica (Brussels), Festival de Wallonie, Festival van Vlaanderen, Tzlil Meudcan Festival (Tel-Aviv), Festival Transit (Leuven), Milano Musica, Festival Next Wave (New York), Festival de Marseille, Festival Courtisane (Gent), Artefact Festival (Leuven), Festival Midis-Minimes (Brussels), Festival Loop (Brussels), Biennale Charleroi-Danse, Gentsche Feesten, Moscow Autumn Contemporary Music Festival, Les Nuits Botanique (Brussels), Quincena Musical (San Sebastián), Imatronic/Piano+ ZKM, and Darmstädter Ferienkurse.

Ginsburgh taught piano and philosophy at the Institut Jaques-Dalcroze and for several years chamber music at the Royal Conservatory of Liège and the music school of Mons. He was assistant for the piano at the Royal Conservatory of Brussels from 2012 until 2018.

He translated Eric Hobsbawm's Uncommon People: Resistance, Rebellion and Jazz into French for Aden Editions. He has also written several articles about politics, and the interpretation of contemporary music.

== Works dedicated to Ginsburgh ==
- En Suspens, concerto for piano and strings by Jean-Luc Fafchamps (2023)
- The Naked Truth by Frederic Rzewski (2021)
- gendarme de la libertad by David Toub (2020)
- Grand Epic Fanfare for flute and piano by Matthew Shlomowitz (2020)
- America: A Poem by Frederic Rzewski (2020)
- Musique pour le lever du jour by Melaine Dalibert (2018)
- Piano Hero #4 by Stefan Prins (2016–17)
- Piano Hero #3 by Stefan Prins (2016)
- Feynman speech sonata by André Ristic (2016)
- A dog is a machine for loving by Alec Hall (2015–2019)
- Dear Diary by Frederic Rzewski (2014)
- Beth/Veth by Jean-Luc Fafchamps (2012)
- Salouette from Three Pieces by Frederic Rzewski dedicated to Salomé Lou Ginsburgh (2011)
- Rap and Tap by Jean-Luc Fafchamps (2011)
- Popular Contexts 2 by Matthew Shlomowitz (2010)
- quartet for piano by David Toub (2010)
- West Pole by Panayiotis Kokoras (2008)
- An die Nacht by Benoît Mernier (2003)
- Back to the voice by Jean-Luc Fafchamps (1999)

== Prizes ==
- Prize Tenuto BRTN 1995, Belgium
- Fondation Schlumberger, Académie Musicale de Villecroze, France
- Ronit Amir Lowenthal Endowment Scholarship, Music Academy of the West, Montecito, US
- Fondation SPES, Brussels
- Prix Pelemans 1999 for interpretation of Belgian contemporary music, Brussels

== Discography ==
Among many CD releases, Ginsburgh's renditions of Marcel Duchamp's Erratum Musical and Morton Feldman's Last Pieces received praising reviews by New York critics. He has recorded three albums with music by Jean-Luc Fafchamps and Morton Feldman. Other recent releases include a five-CD box for Sub Rosa with Feldman's complete piano music, The Bad-Tempered Electronic Keyboard - 24 Preludes and Fugues by Anthony Burgess for Grand Piano/Naxos Records, and Sergei Prokofiev's complete piano sonatas for Cypres Records, which was praised by critics as "fireworks of creativity".

=== Selected recordings ===
- Gendarme de la Libertad, David Toub, Sub Rosa, 2025
- Two Extended Pieces for Four Pianos, Julius Eastman, 2 LPs, Sub Rosa, 2022
- Speaking Rzewski, Frederic Rzewski, Sub Rosa, 2021
- Three Extended Pieces for Four Pianos, Julius Eastman, Sub Rosa, 2021
- Augmented, Stefan Prins, Kairos, 2019
- The Bad-Tempered Electronic Keyboard – 24 Preludes and Fugues, Anthony Burgess, Grand Piano/Naxos Records, 2018
- Ataraxia, David Toub, World Edition, 2016
- Intégrale des Sonates pour piano, Sergei Prokofiev, Cypres records, 2015
- Beth/Veth, Jean-Luc Fafchamps, Sub Rosa, 2015
- Back to, Jean-Luc Fafchamps, Sub Rosa, 2013
- Vexations, Erik Satie, Sub Rosa, 2008
- For Bunita Marcus, Morton Feldman, Sub Rosa, 2006
- Melencholia si..., Jean-Luc Fafchamps, Sub Rosa, 2001
- Erratum Musical, Marcel Duchamp, Sub Rosa, 2001
- Last Pieces, Morton Feldman, Sub Rosa, 2001
- Is, Renaud De Putter, Sub Rosa, 1999
- Chorée, Renaud De Putter, Sub Rosa, 1998
- Pieces for More Than Two Hands, Morton Feldman, Sub Rosa, 1991
