= Stefan Prins =

Belgian composer and performer (born 1979)

- Born: 20 May 1979 (age 47); Kortrijk, Belgium
- Occupation: Composer
- Organization(s): Sub Rosa, Kairos
- Website: stefanprins.be

Stefan Prins (born 20 May 1979) is a Belgian composer and performer.

== Biography ==
=== Studies ===
Born in Kortrijk, Stefan Prins studied composition at the Royal Conservatoire of Antwerp from which he holds a master's degree (2009) and specialized in sonology at the Royal Conservatory of The Hague (2005). In 2017 he obtained a PhD in composition at Harvard University under the supervision of Chaya Czernowin.

He also graduated from the Vrije Universiteit Brussel and the Polytechnic University of Catalonia in electrotechnical engineering specialising in photonics (2002).

=== Career ===
Stefan Prins's music has been performed in numerous international music festivals and concert series such as Donaueschingen Festival (Germany), Darmstädter Ferienkurse (Germany), ECLAT Festival (Stuttgart), Wittener Tage für neue Kammermusik (Germany), Züricher Tage für Neue Musik (Switzerland), ISCM World Music Days (Wroclaw, Poland), Deutschlandfunk Forum Neue Musik (Köln, Germany), University of Haifa (Israel), Imatronic ZKM (Karlsruhe), Under the Radar Festival (Omaha, USA), Moscow International House of Music (Russia), Wien Modern (Austria), Ultima Oslo Contemporary Music Festival (Norway), Ars Musica (Belgium), Museum of Contemporary Art Helsinki (Finland), Installactions (Warsaw), Tzlil Meudcan (Tel Aviv), Mata Interval Series (NYC), Kesselhaus (Berlin, Germany), Nowy Teatr Warschau (Poland), Musica Viva (München), Rainy Days Festival (Luxemburg), Huddersfield Contemporary Music Festival (UK), Impuls Festival (Austria), Konzerthaus, Vienna (Austria), Transit Festival (Belgium), Festival Musica Strasbourg (France), Luzerne Festival (Switzerland).

Many ensembles and musicians have performed his music such as Nadar Ensemble, Klangforum Wien, Ensemble Nikel, Ensemble Mosaik, Trio Accanto, Champ d'Action, Ensemble Recherche, Ensemble Dal Niente, Vertixe Sonora Ensemble, L'Arsenale, Zwerm Electric Guitar Quartet, Jean-Guihen Queyras, Chris Wild, Frederik Croene, Matthias Koole, Tom Pauwels, Mark Knoop, Gwen Rouger, Stéphane Ginsburgh, Sebastian Berweck, Séverine Ballon, and many more.

Stefan Prins is co-artistic director of Nadar Ensemble, founding member (live-electronics) of the ensemble Ministry of Bad Decisions, with Brian Archinal and Yaron Deutsch, and founding member (2001) of instant composed trio collectief reFLEXible.

He's guest-professor composition at the Hochschule für Kunste Bern (2018 onwards), Norwegian Academy for Music Oslo (2019–2020) and was appointed professor for composition and head of the Hybrid Music Lab at the Hochschule für Musik "Carl Maria Von Weber" Dresden (2020-2026).

=== Prizes ===
- Kunstpreis Berlin für Musik (2016)
- ISCM Young Composers Award (2014)
- Laureate of the Royal Flemish Academy of Belgium of Sciences and Arts, class of the Arts (2014)
- Adelbert W. Sprague Prize for "Generation Kill", Harvard University (2014)
- Young Belgian Musician of the Year (2012)
- Kranichsteiner Musikpreis for composition (Darmstadt, 2010)
- Staubach Honorarium (2009, Darmstadt)
- International Impuls Composition Award (Graz, 2009)
- Week of the Contemporary Music (Gent, 2006, 2nd Prize)
- KBC Aquarius Composition Award for Young Composers (Brussels, 2001)

== Selected compositions ==
- under_current [2020-2021] (36') for e-guitar, orchestra & live-electronics / premiered by Yaron Deutsch, Luxembourg Philharmonic Orchestra, cond. Ilan Volkov, sound-engineer Florian Bogner at Donaueschinger Musiktage, 15 October 2021
- Third Space [2016–2018] (80') for 10 musicians, live-electronics & live-video, collaboration with Daniel Linehan / premiered by Klangforum Wien and dance company Hiatus at Münchener Biennale für Neues Musiktheater 2018, 4 May 2018, München
- Piano Hero #4 [2016–2017] (12') for midi-keyboard, live-electronics and live-video / premiered by Stephane Ginsburgh at Muziekcentrum De Bijloke Gent, 25 March 2017, Gent
- Piano Hero #3 [2016] (25') for piano, midi-keyboard and live electronics / premiered by Stephane Ginsburgh in July 2016 at Darmstädter Ferienkurse
- Mirror Box Extensions [2014–2015] (35') for 7 instruments, live-electronics & live-video / premiered by Nadar Ensemble at Donaueschinger Musiktage 2015, 17 October 2015, Donaueschingen
- Mirror Box (Flesh+Prosthesis #3) [2014] (22') for tenor saxophone, percussion, piano & live-electronics / premiered by Trio Accanto at Eclat Festival, 6 February 2014, Stuttgart
- Flesh+Prosthesis No. 0, 1, 2 [2013–14] (16') for tenor saxophone, percussion, piano, electric guitar & live-electronics / premiered by Nikel Ensemble
- Generation Kill [2012] (25') for percussion, electric guitar, violin, cello, 4 musicians with game controllers, 4 video-projections, live-video / premiered in October 2012 by Nadar Ensemble at Donaueschingen Festival
- Piano Hero #2 [2011, rev. 2013, 2016] (8') for amplified piano, midi-keyboard, live-electronics and video / premiered by Mark Knoop in November 2011 at Huddersfield Contemporary Music Festival
- Piano Hero #1 [2011] (8') for midi-keyboard, live-electronics and video / premiered by Frederik Croene, 2011, deSingel
- Fremdkörper #3 [2010] (11') for amplified ensemble & sampler /premiered by Klangforum Wien, 2011, at Impuls Festival

== Selected recordings ==
- Augmented, Kairos 0015044KAI (April 2019), monographic DVD+CD
- "Flesh+Prosthesis #0–2", "Fremdkörper #2" on Nikel – A Decade (July 2017)
- Cloud Chamber – improvisations with Peter Jacquemyn on Champdaction Recordings (December 2016)
- "Mirror Box Extensions" on Donaueschinger Musiktage 2015, Neos 11611-12 (October 2016)
- "Mirror Box (Flesh+Prosthesis #3)" on Trio Accanto Edition Vol. 1, WERGO (2016)
- "Generation Kill" on Donaueschinger Musiktage 2012, Neos 11303-05 (October 2013)
- Fremdkörper, Sub Rosa SR352 (June 2012): monographic double-cd
- Realgar – improvisations with collectief reFLEXible, Amirani Records, AMRN 013 (October 2008)

== Selected bibliography ==
=== About Stefan Prins ===
- Alien Bodies, Stefan Prins' aesthetics of music, Tomasz Biernacki, Dissonance
- Darmstadt New Wave Modernism, Celeste Oram, Tempo (2015)

=== By Stefan Prins ===
- Corps Hybrides dans les Espaces Hybrides, Dissonance nr. 140 (December 2017)
- Über das Multidimensionale, MusikTexte, Heft 145 (May 2015)
- Het Theater van het Hybride Lichaam, Kunsttijdschrift Vlaanderen (April 2015)
- Composing Today : Luft von diesem Planeten, Darmstädter Beiträge zum Neuen Musik, band 22 (August 2014)
- Composing Today : Luft von diesem Planeten, Klangforum Agenda 2013–14 (August 2013)
- Together with Pieter Matthynssens: “Nadar Ensemble: Verankerung in der heutigen Welt, in Positionen, Heft 97 (November 2013)
- Komponieren Heute: Luft von diesem Planeten, in Positionen, Heft 97 (November 2013)
