= Mouvement (– vor der Erstarrung) =

- Composition for ensemble by Helmut Lachenmann
- Year: 1982–1984
- Period: Contemporary
- Dedication: Péter Eötvös
- Performed: 12 November 1984: Paris
- Scoring: Chamber ensemble

Mouvement (– vor der Erstarrung) [Movement (– before freezing)], is a composition for a small ensemble by Helmut Lachenmann, written between 1982 and 1984. The music's use of extended techniques exemplifies the style the composer calls musique concrète instrumentale.

== History ==
The work was composed on a commission of the Ensemble intercontemporain and is dedicated to Péter Eötvös. The work was premiered on 12 November 1984 at the Théâtre du Rond-Point in Paris, by the ensemble conducted by Eötvös. It was published by Breitkopf & Härtel.

The Mouvement (– vor der Erstarrung) refers to the last movements before stiffening in death. The music represents a life of bursts and decomposition. This decomposition is not treated or, worse, celebrated as a natural process, but rather suggested by the fracture of the sound (i.e. by the "melodic" modification of the distortion factor, in the case of percussive events, or by the use of mute, etc.).

At the beginning, there seems to be no connection between the notes played. Almost all of them are separate notes, which do not seem to have any connection with each other, similar to John Cage's Atlas Eclipticalis (1962). The sound image is mainly silent. During the first minutes this alienating effect persists; it is amplified by the fact that an instrument is sometimes turned on in the traditional way, at other times instruments are electronically amplified, at other times not, and at other times the composer allows an instrument to be played in a way that the composer himself has devised.

Slowly but surely they are no longer separate tones/notes but tones/notes series within an instrument; it happens more and more often. Also, ensemble players enter, until after sixteen minutes everything starts to coincide. A timbre is created that is known from Classical music, even a measure format seems to be present. However, this interaction is of short duration. After the interplay everything falls apart again and the piece ends as the beginning, more silence than music. There is no final chord and there is not even a final note. The work just stops.

The title can be explained by the fact that the music seems to rise out of nowhere and move. The alternation of tones / notes seems to be based on coincidence, yet the music eventually gets off to a natural start; for example, there are no sudden transitions to more tones / notes or playing together; it happens via an almost natural way. The same applies more or less to the crumbling of the whole; after having been in full swing one brakes off and at the end (?) one comes to a complete standstill (rigidity).

The music is scored for:

- flute, doubling piccolo; alto flute, doubling piccolo; 2 clarinets, 1 doubling bass clarinet,
- 2 trumpets,
- 2 violas, 2 cellos, 1 double bass,
- 3 percussionists: 2 xylorimbas, timpani.

== Recordings ==
- Mouvement (– vor der Erstarrung); Consolation I & II, Klangforum Wien conducted by Hans Zender, Kairos, 1998.
- Schwankungen am Rand; Mouvement; Zwei Gefühle, Ensemble Modern, conducted by Péter Eötvös, ECM Records, 2002.
