= La lontananza nostalgica utopica futura =

Composition for violin and tape by Luigi Nono

La lontananza nostalgica utopica futura Madrigale per più "caminantes" con Gidon Kremer
- by Luigi Nono
- Authoritative recording, released posthumously
- English: The nostalgic utopian future distance
- Composed: 1988 – 1989: Berlin, Germany
- Performed: 3 September 1988: Berlin (withdrawn)
- Published: 1989:
- Movements: 6
- Scoring: Solo violin and eight magnetic tapes

La lontananza nostalgica utopica futura: Madrigale per più "caminantes" con Gidon Kremer (Italian: The nostalgic utopian future distance: Madrigal for several "travellers" with Gidon Kremer) is an experimental work by Italian avant-garde composer Luigi Nono scored for a solo violinist and eight magnetic tapes. Composed between 1988 and 1989, it is one of Nono's last compositions.

== Background ==
La lontananza is the result of Nono's collaboration with renowned violinist Gidon Kremer, who had premiered a number of contemporary and avant-garde compositions at the time. Nono and Kremer first met a year prior, in March 1987, in Freiburg, after a common acquaintance, Charlotte Geselbracht, had taken Kremer to Venice, Nono's hometown, one month prior, so they could meet for the first time. After much discussing, they committed to a performance in the months of Fall, 1988, at the Berlin Festwochen. The recording process of the tapes took place between February 15 to 19, 1988, at the Experimental Studio of the Heinrich Strobel Foundation, in Freiburg, Germany. The recordings mainly consisted of improvisations on the part of Kremer, where Nono studied his playing and processed and manipulated the sounds to create a final tape on June 25 of that same year.

Nono promised to send drafts and sketches to Kremer so he could practice and learn the piece during the summer of 1988. Kremer, however, received no score until two days before the premiere, on August 31, when Kremer decided to travel to Berlin to meet Nono in person. Upon meeting, Kremer could listen to the tapes but only have a gander at a few fragments in some scraps of paper. After promising once more to give him the full score the following day, Kremer was presented with two pages of the score in the morning of September 1, and would complete the rest of the violin part during the remaining hours of the day. The score was complete and handed to Kremer at the Philharmonie at 6 p. m. and amounted to 9 whole sides of manuscript paper. The resulting sheet music was full of precise expression markings and difficult-to-read passages that made it a challenge for the piece to be practiced at all, even with the help of a few colleagues such as Hans Peter Haller, Rudolf Strauss or Alvise Vidolin. Unhappy with the tape, Nono asked Kremer to play the piece solo, without tape accompaniment. After some discussion, the piece was premiered with the tapes under the title La lontananza nostalgica-futura on September 3, 1988, at the Berliner Philharmonie, and a violin-solo version adapted and shortened by Kremer was performed the very next day, at the Philharmonie, on account of another work by Nono being dropped because of a disagreement between Nono and another composer. After a second complete performance at La Scala, in Milan, on October 2, the composer withdrew the violin part and completely rewrote it, rearranging the way the tapes would interact with the live violinist. The revised version would be finished on January 31, 1989, in Berlin, titled as we recognize it today. Kremer was unaware of this change until he saw the published version after Nono's death, one year later.

The piece, dedicated to Salvatore Sciarrino, bears an explicit reference to one of Sciarrino's works, All'aure in una lontananza, composed in 1977. The dedicatee interpreted the title as follows: "the past reflected in the present (nostalgica) brings about a creative utopia (utopica), the desire for what is known becomes a vehicle for what will be possible (futura) through the medium of distance (lontananza)". The word "caminantes" is taken from a poem by Antonio Machado included in his book Campos de Castilla. The fragment, which Nono first saw on the wall of a cloister in Toledo, reads: "Caminante, no hay caminos, hay que caminar" (Traveller, there are no ways, but we must go). The piece was published by Casa Ricordi in 1989 and the authoritative recording was released posthumously in 1992 by Deutsche Grammophon.

== Structure ==
The piece takes between forty minutes and one hour to perform, although the score specifies that it should have a duration of 45 minutes. It is scored for a solo violin and eight magnetic tapes. A performance also requires eight to ten music stands, located in many different places on stage as well as amongst the audience seating area. Nono specified that La lontananza is not "in any circumstance a concerto for solo and accompaniment", as he purposefully avoided the piece to be regarded as a showpiece with flashy virtuosism—it mainly deals with the interaction between the recorded tape (and the way the sound engineer uses it in a live performance) and the violin, as it is up to the sound engineer to decide what material is going to be used, how, and how prevalent over the violin it is going to be. La lontananza is, as a matter of fact, a duo between those two forces: Gidon Kremer and the "Caminantes".

=== Score and violin part ===
The original score consists of six different "leggii", that is, parts-connections, all of them contrasting, each one placed on a different music stand, leaving multiple stands with no sheet music on them. Each leggio is three pages long, except for the first one which is two pages long.

The score is reproduced from Nono's original handwriting and has not been typeset. It includes a great number of expression and technical markings that explain with great amount of detail how each one of the phrases should be played. It also features a number of advanced violin techniques. Notes are often badly drawn, with ledger lines going into unused staves, stems appearing on the wrong side, pitches indicated as text in brackets, etc. Dynamics range from ppppppppp to sfffff.

Nono also indicates in the score that the soloist must physically move in search of the next leggio. All stands (not just the ones with music on them) need to be placed far from one another, in a way that causes the performer not to be able to reach the next stand directly, but having to walk around to reach it. The last stand-leggio must be placed near the stage exit, as the performed is required to leave the hall at the end of the piece. A similar set-up would be needed for Nono's next and last composition, "Hay que caminar" soñando, where the violinists also have to walk around the stage to arrive at their stands.

=== Tapes ===
Eight tapes with a total running time of around 60 minutes are used for performance. Some variation of the following note usually appears on recordings: "Production and electronic realization of the 8-track magnetic tape under the direction of Luigi Nono and Hans Peter Haller in the Experimental Studio of the Heinrich Strobel Foundation Südwestrundfunk Freiburg. Rudolf Strauss, sound engineer. The final version of this tape, based on the solo part recorded by Gidon Kremer, was prepared together by Sofia Gubaidulina and Gidon Kremer in Freiburg".

Contrary to what happens in other Nono's compositions, the recordings have to be re-engineered for every new performance, as the tracks are not supposed to be superimposed. Even though Nono claims that the tapes have not been manipulated in any way in the score, André Richard, director of the Heinrich Strobel Experimental Studio said that the material was "transformed electronically, using Harmonizer (frequency shifter), reverberation, filters, delays, Halaphon".

According to Richard, the eight tapes can be categorized into four groups:

- Tapes 1 & 2: very dense harmonic material, superimposed.
- Tapes 3 & 4: original, untreated violin sound using different modes of attack, intersparsed with singles notes and fifths.
- Tapes 5 & 6: voices, words, and different sounds from doors, chairs, etc., together with violin sounds.
- Tapes 7 & 8: high melodic material, melodies in harmonics, fast tremolos, spiccato, and jeté.

The tapes 1 and 2 are constructed through the layering of various materials. These fragments include allusions to melodies from well-known violin repertoire, engaging in a dialogue with recordings of violin tuning, sustained open strings, ostinati, and repeated accents featuring recognizable patterns. With the use of electronic processes, multiple layers of sounds are generated, facilitated by harmonizers, while simultaneously manipulating the tapes by slowing them down and speeding them up.

Tapes 3 and 4, however, have a definite structure, with five elaborations of one initial fragment lasting for about twelve seconds. This fragment consists of a slow melody on the IV string, played with the wood of the bow, with accents and sforzato intersparsed, joining dialogues and sounds such as exclamations, coughing and laughs, as well as ambient noises, such as the studio door opening and closing. This "assembled pseudo-working session" is specifically designed to resemble a live recording studio, upon which Nono later made repetitions with modifications.

Tracks 5 and 6 feature other miscellaneous sounds prominently, i. e., sounds that do not come from the violin. Here, Nono mixes voices, conversations, coughs, laughs, and other electric sounds, such as metallic resonances, buzzes, bangs on doors, etc. The two tapes are constructed using a recognizable pattern that is 20 seconds long. Spatialization is present in these two tracks, as Nono was very concerned with the spatial movements within the tapes.

Tapes 7 and 8, finally, follow the same formal structure as tapes 3 and 4. The tapes consist of an initial fragment that is around 12 seconds long and five reinterpretations and elaboration on the same original material. This initial material, however, can only be inferred, as each one of the repetitions rearrange the order of elements, the layers, and the dynamic settings of each element. After the first presentation of the fragment, the listener hears a gradual process of deformation which renders the end result hard to decipher.

== Recordings ==
=== Authoritative version ===
The revised version was recorded with Gidon Kremer in December 1990, in Laufen, Switzerland. Nono, who died a few months prior, was unable to supervise the recording himself and, because of this, Sofia Gubaidulina was in charge of supervising and re-arranging the tape together with Kremer. The recording was released by Deutsche Grammophon in 1992, together with "Hay que caminar" soñando.

=== Other recordings ===
The following is an incomplete list of recordings of the piece as of 2024:

- Violinist Irvine Arditti and composer André Richard recorded the piece in December 1991 at the Experimental Studio of the Heinrich Strobel Foundation. The recording was released on CD by Montaigne in a series dedicated to the Arditti Quartet.
- Violinist Clemens Merkel and sound engineer Wolfgang Heiniger also made a recording that was released on CD in 2001 by Edition Wandelweiser.
- Violinist Melisse Mellinger and composer and dedicatee Salvatore Sciarrino also recorded the piece between July 3 to 6, 2001, at the Westdeutscher Rundfunk. The recording was released on CD by Kairos in 2003.
- Violinist Tiziana Pintus and sound engineer Hans van Eck made a recording that was released on CD and digital download on May 26, 2013 by Sub Rosa.
- Violinist Marco Fusi and composer Pierluigi Billone recorded the piece in March 6 and 7, 2020, in Brussels, Belgium. The recording was released on CD by Kairos in September 2020.
