= Reigen seliger Geister =

1989 string quartet by Helmut Lachenmann

Reigen seliger Geister (German for Dance of the Blessed Spirits) is a string quartet composed by Helmut Lachenmann in 1989.

== History ==
This is Helmut Lachenmann's second string quartet, after Gran Torso (1971–1972) and before Grido (2001). The title is based on the name Ballet des ombres heureuses, from Gluck's opera Orfeo ed Euridice.

The German composer wrote a text on this work entitled "On my Second String Quartet" (1995–2002), published in Écrits et Entretiens.

It takes about half an hour to execute.

== Analysis ==
This quartet is characterized by its various playing modes, which require to play first flautando, then by playing the bow on the chevilles or the scroll of the instrument, then by "rocket sounds", executed by pushing the bow on the string in an accelerated manner, or in pizzicato. At some point, musicians must use a plectrum and place their instrument on their knees like a guitar.

This unique guitar game is organized around an alternation of muffled sounds and resonant strings.

A final focus occurs at the end of the quartet, when the instrumentalists play "perforated" sounds by excessively pressing the bow on the string. Here again, the perception is disturbed when it is discovered that beyond a sound that seems violent, torn ("perforated"), excessive (because it is too rich), there are melodic paths up and down, depending on whether the bow is moved along the string, towards the bridge or towards the fingerboard.

== Discography ==
- Reigen Seliger Geister, Tanzsuite mit Deutschlandlied, Arditti Quartet, Montaigne 1994, Naïve Records, 2000.
- Grido – Reigen Seliger Geister – Gran Torso, Arditti Quartet, Kairos, 2007.
- String Quartets, Stadler Quartett, NEOS, 2010.
- Complete String Quartets, JACK Quartet, Mode Records/WDR, 2015.
