= On the Guarding of the Heart =

Music composition by Djuro Zivkovic

- by Djuro Zivkovic
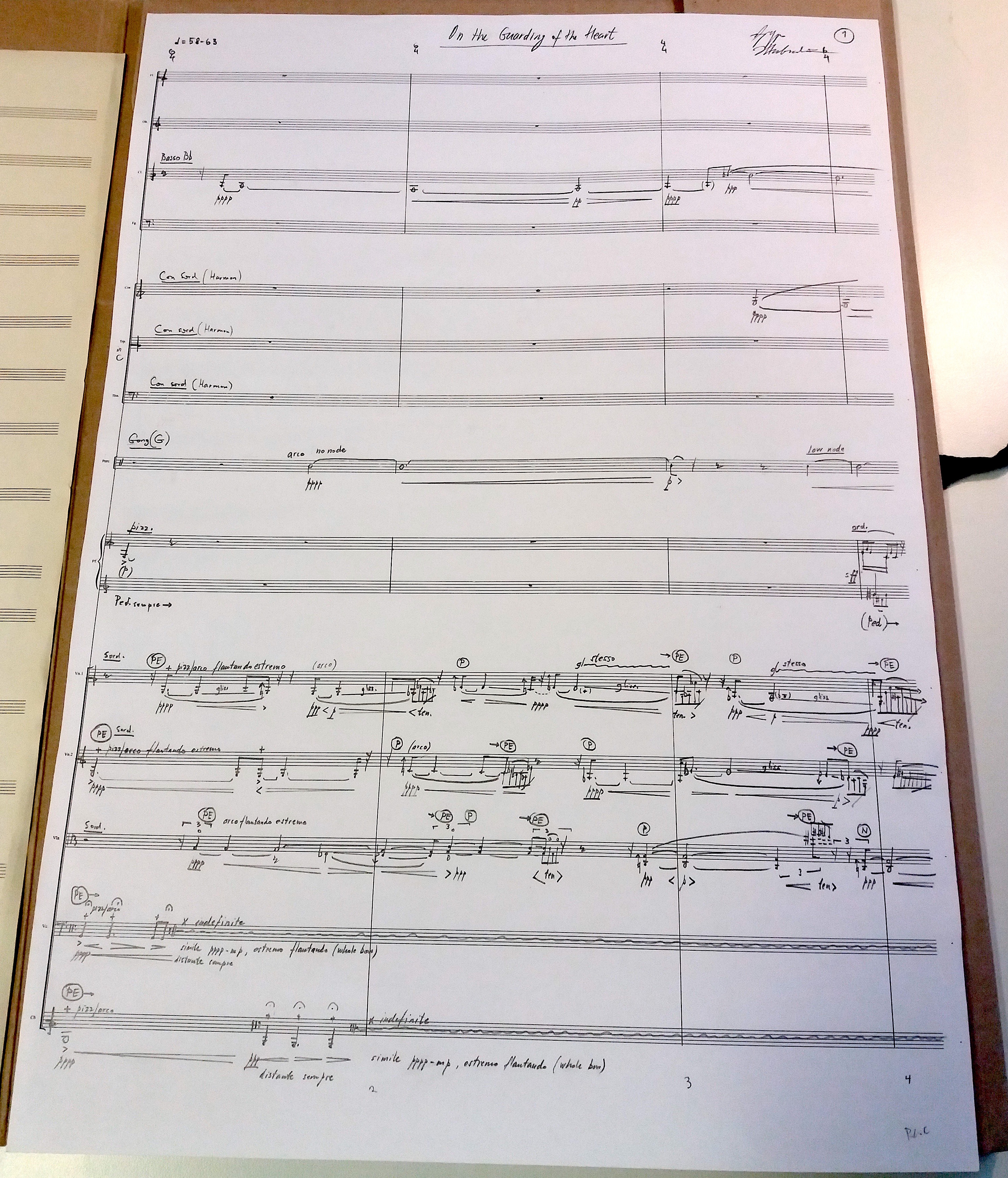
- The first manuscript page by the composer
- Composed: 2011
- Dedication: Klangforum Wien
- Scoring: Chamber orchestra

Premiere
- Date: 14 November 2011
- Location: Terazije Theatre, Belgrade
- Conductor: Clement Power
- Performers: Klangforum Wien

On the Guarding of the Heart for chamber orchestra is the most known instrumental work by Serbian-Swedish composer Djuro Zivkovic. The work was commissioned by the Klangforum Wien, written in 2011, and premiered on 14 November 2011 in the Terazije Theatre, Belgrade, during the International Composers' Festival held that year. The conductor for the premiere was Clement Power conducting the Klangforum Wien. The piece has received the world's largest prize for musical composition the Grawemeyer Award in 2014. Since its premiere, despite the complexity of the work, the piece was performed around the world more than 40 times. The music is composed during July–October 2011, partly in Gagnef and in Stockholm.

The approximate duration of the piece is 20 minutes.

== Instrumentation ==
The composition is scored for 1 flute, 1 oboe, 1 clarinet, 1 bassoon, 1 horn, 1 trumpet piccolo, 1 trombone, 1 percussion, 1 piano, 2 violins, 1 viola, 1 cello and 1 contrabass. The piece has numerous doublings including human whistle and voices.

== The Grawemeyer Award ==
The composition has received the Grawemeyer Award for musical composition in year 2014, with the sum of US$100.000. The 20-minute work “makes a huge emotional journey in a relatively short period of time, moving through many landscapes between the mysterious, moody opening and the ecstatic conclusion. The composer also makes wonderful use of the colors of the 14-piece ensemble. The instruments are used in fascinating ways, both traditional and otherwise … that shape the sound of unnatural, echoing beauty,” said award director Marc Satterwhite.

== Djuro Zivkovic on "On the Guarding of the Heart" ==
"The main theme of “On the Guarding of the Heart” is the need to return into oneself, to descent with the intellect in to the depths of the heart, to guard it and to seek there the hidden treasure of the inner kingdom. The music is very stimulated by reading of the Philokalia; it is about a hard-achieved detachment, stillness and watchfulness, it is about solitude and exile"

Zivkovic explains further the beginning of the music in his document "How to perform On the Guarding of the Heart" with the following statements: "The piece starts in a kind of sound genesis, which can be also a universal genesis, beginning of matter, or birth of life, a summation of time. (…) VIOLIN 1+2 and VIOLA have a genetic birth; or thousands of genomes and thoughts that flow in a deep prayer. (…) The PIANO enters with a self-sacrificing idea, it represents awakening from the dreamy world. It sums up all your mind, and makes every thing into one and clear. Piano plays strongly, without trying to land in the dreamy world of other instruments. Its playing is like a moment of discovery of a scientists. It is the intellectual sum of the mind in a prayer."

Furthermore, the last measure of the composition he explains as following: "It is attempt to condensate everything in mind and soul, it is understanding of the totality, it is putting all things at their proper place in the universe. It is order of the faith. It is a state exempt from the evil. (…) The sound must melt walls in the hall, the audience should stop breathing, and every single atom and particles of time should condense in ‘the true unfading light, in the eternal life, in hidden mystery, in everlasting exultation, in ineffable reality, and will come close to the incomprehensible face’."

== Recordings ==
- LAWO Classics released the CD "Xtended Hearts and Unheard Herds" in 2019. Thomas Rimul conducts with the Norwegian Ensemble Ernst.
