= Đuro Živković =

Serbian-Swedish composer

Đuro Živković, also rendered as Djuro Zivkovic (Serbian Cyrillic: Ђуро Живковић; born 1975), is a Serbian-Swedish composer and violinist. He has lived in Stockholm, Sweden, since 2000.

== Biography ==
Živković was born in Belgrade, where he studied violin and composition at the Music Academy. He later studied at the Royal College of Music in Stockholm under Pär Lindgren.

His musical style is characterized by fantastic narration, virtuosic instrumentation and stylistic, highly profiled sound. He has developed a variety of compositional techniques such as polyrhythmic improvisation, special harmony-based scales, microtones, layer-polyphony and heterophony. His "harmonic field" technique, which include the difference tone harmonisations as well as the Ancient mode was a topic for academic research at the University of Music and Performing Arts in Graz in Austria, and can be found in several of his works, including "Le Cimetière Marin" and "The White Angel." He has composed a wide range of works including chamber, orchestral and vocal music, music for solo instruments and choral music.

Živković is also a professional violinist and violist, performing new music, as well as an improviser on violin and piano. He has received many international scholarships and prizes for his work, including the Grawemeyer Award in 2014. He has worked as a teacher of composition, music theory and aural training and violin and chamber music.

Živković's music is regularly commissioned and performed across the world by groups like the New York Philharmonic, Royal Concertgebouw Amsterdam, Chicago Symphony Orchestra, Sydney Symphony Orchestra, Seattle Symphony Orchestra, Klangforum Wien, Asko|Schönberg and Ensemble Modern.

In May 2021, Zivkovic was one of 10 new members elected to the Royal Swedish Academy of Music, alongside Marika Field, Katarina Karnéus, Jonas Knutsson, Sten Sandell, Richard Sparks, Keiko Abe, Giancarlo Andretta, Stefan Dohr, and Quincy Jones.

== Selected works ==
=== Metaphysical Poem (1997–1998) ===
Sonata for violin and piano is a 37-minutes long monolithic oration in five movements. The sonata is entitled metaphysical, stressing thus the composer's need for meta-levels in music and his thoughts. All movements are played attacca and both instruments have very little time to rest. The sonata is a step forward from its precedents (Bartok or Shostakovich) in both sound and technique, and is indeed a very serious and complex work of young Zivkovic. The last movement, Ison, is based on Zivkovic's early piano improvisations, where he added here the violin part. The sonata was written during Zivkovic's studies at the Music Academy in Belgrade, in the class of Vlastimir Trajković.

=== The White Angel (2006) ===
A 13-minute long piece for sinfonietta, it premiered on 2nd March 2006, played by the SAMI sinfonietta under the conduction of Katarina Andreasson. This piece may have been inspired by the White Angel, the fresco of an angel dressed in white at the tomb of Christ, found in the Monastery of Mileševa.

The score of The White Angel is a musical shaping of elements of dynamics, radiation, kinetic and other categories that actually explain the energy, love and moving - the three characteristics of angelic existence. "The White Angel", inspired by Mileshevo's fresco, is in fact the spiritual, moral, aesthetic and technical composing sublimate of all previous intentions and interests of the composer. Formed in a clear form that does not inhibit pure energy of the music, the duration is in a balance of the content and can be said—is well measured (13 min.) and it represents a valuable achievement of the Serbian, Swedish and European music in the 21st century. If nothing else, we couldn't find anything similar and nothing comparable in the modern music that we know. (review by Milorad Marinkovic)

=== Le Cimetière Marin (2008) ===
Paul Valery's poem of the same name inspired Živković for the piece commissioned and dedicated to famous mezzo-soprano Anna Larsson and chamber ensemble Sonanza, who gave its premiere. The piece is recorded on the label "Phono Suecia" among other pieces by Swedish composers, and won the Swedish Grammy Award as the best classical CD of year 2009.

=== On the Guarding of the Heart (2011) ===
On the Guarding of the Heart was commissioned by and dedicated to Das Klangforum Wien. The premiere was led by British conductor Clement Power. The piece represents Živković's highest achievement in his compositional technique, complexity and musical accessibility. He was awarded the 2014 Grawemeyer Award for Music Composition for the work.

Živković offers a Utopia of new stability and order that, within the social chaos, can be found only in society’s ‘antipode’: the individual. However, the ‘information’ about their own depths to which they allegedly descend is conveyed to the individuals through a work of art, a phenomenon whose ontological and phenomenological foundation relies on institutional support and social engagement – in other words, it stems from the place it occupies in a society’s production structure. Also, the knowledge of ‘the depths of the heart’ comes from a composer who mastered the technique, and is not likely to use all of those fantasies to snap the audience out of their lethargy and confront them with the current problems. On the contrary, by eliminating uncertainty he induces us to ‘descend’ somewhere where ‘eternity’ overpowers current problems, and that place he calls ‘the heart’ of ‘the spiritual.’ Živković, therefore, as a creator, builds the image of a guardian of tradition who, thanks to his technical skills, transcends national boundaries, proving the ‘propriety’ and ‘extra-temporality’ of his construction of Serbian heritage, which, if adequately mediated, will demonstrate its value by closeness to universal ‘truths’.

=== Ascetic Discourse (2012) ===
Commissioned and dedicated to Carina Vinke (mezzo-soprano), New European Ensemble (the Netherlands) and Christian Karlsen (conductor). The piece earned the Mokranjac Award 2012. The Award Committee writes the following:

"Ascetic Discourse," a cantata for mezzo-soprano and chamber ensemble, is a generously designed and substantially diverse music that is characterized by multidirectional communication, both with the modern trends, as well as the ancient, traditional sources of inspiration and musical thought. The text of father Philimon taken from the old Byzantine collection of spiritual texts "Philokalia" has profoundly defined his colorful, delicate, innovative and emotionally-experienced music. Djuro Zivkovic sovereignly rules with the modern compositional and musical techniques, which stand deep in the function of his artistic individuality that possesses a finished aesthetic style. "Ascetic Discourse" is a work of music that establishes a step forward into new and authentic Serbian and European contemporary music.

=== Unceasing Prayers (2013) ===
Concerto for cello and orchestra, commissioned by Swedish Radio. The premiere was given by cellist Hanna Dahlkvist and conductor Shi-Yeon Sung, together with Malmö Symphony Orchestra. The music is inspired by book "The Way of a Pilgrim", a 19th-century Russian work, recounting the narrator's journey as a mendicant pilgrim across Russia while practicing the Jesus Prayer. Musical elements which Zivkovic include in the concerto are: numerous repetitions, plain chant from the Russian north, church bells, Syrian Orthodox church song, etc. The piece is strongly associated with "Ascetic Discourse" in which the concerto has its roots. The first movement is entitled "Ich ruf zu Dir, Herr Jesu Christ", as a spiritual reminiscence of Bach's chorale prelude BWV 639.

The concerto has received "Lilla Christ Johnson Award" in 2019, by the Swedish Royal Music Academy.

=== The Mystical Sacrifice (2016) ===
A part of a larger passion project for solo tenor, chorus and orchestra; commissioned and written for the Royal Concertgebouw Orchestra who premiered the work in April 2017, with Jeffrey Lloyd-Roberts - tenor, the Netherlands Radio Choir and Martyn Brabbins - conductor. The work is sung in the Church-Slavonic and has drawn on the Orthodox Easter liturgy, of which forgiveness and redemption are the key focus. "The Mystical Sacrifice" covers the end of "passion" with Good Friday and Saturday. Zivkovic plans to complete the full passion week including the resurrection.

=== Bogoluchie (2018) ===
Is a liturgical drama for solo voice, solo guitar, monk choir and large ensemble. The work is commissioned by the society for new music KammarmusikNU and is dedicated to the conductor Christian Karlsen who made the premiere. The piece utilizes the various instrumental and vocal types including orthodox monk choir, amplified and with added effects of acoustic guitar (solo), vocal soloist playing percussions, numerous doublings including a large amount of bell-like instruments. Zivkovic's idea for the work is to create a space and time between ritual and concert, thus the regular applause doesn't occur. The work premiere was staged by Aleksi Barrière. Ierotheos commented the concert with these words:

The dramatic plot and composer's powerful expression made highly emotional the audience's experience and contemplation over the holy texts of St Simeon's Hymns, which were sung and extolled in Greek, English and Church-Slavonic by the vocal soloist Carina Vinke and the Choir of Monastery Kovilj. This liturgical drama, which is conceived foremost as a musical-dramatic work, overcame its artistic framework by penetrating, at moments, into the sphere of a true clergic worship. And that “Bogoluchie” indeed succeeded to be such, testifies the closing of the drama that ended without the usual applause. Being impressed and affected by the miraculous synthesis of contemporary melodies and ancient church music - which infused at all times the prayers and sermons of St Symeon, soaked in repentance and weeping, but also in hope of re-seeing the Face of God - viewers and listeners of this liturgical and all-human drama left the Nykirken church in a sacred silence, continuing to experience and live the same drama even outside of its own divine space.

== Ancient mode ==
The Ancient Mode is a compositional technique based on a synthetic scale called "ancient scale", constructed and used by composer Djuro Zivkovic in his compositions since 2004. Živković published his work about the Ancient Mode in the form of a white paper in November 2025. Thus, the Mode is a technique and the Scale is a pitch-class. The first example is found in his Sophisticated Prelude No.1 for piano solo. Because of its vibrating, colourful sound, and the way how Zivkovic developed it in his music, he has named it "the ancient".

=== Construction ===
The Ancient Scale is built around the central tone, thus creating a "mirroring" scale:

The scale is similar to Messiaen's second mode, however the Ancient Scale has nine tones, with dense half steps around the central tone. The central tone is not 'finalis', neither the tonic, it is just constructed in that particular way.

The scale can be transposed 12 times. It is possible to use the tonal harmonic principles for modulation, such as diatonic, chromatic or enharmonic modulation between these modes. The far-most modulation can be achieved in the distance of major third (E – Ab – C).

=== Quality ===
The Ancient Scale has extremely diverse chordal possibilities. It includes a multitude of tonal associations and can create clusters, minor and major chords, pentatonic scale, diminished and augmented chords, and near-to complete the major and minor scale. Comparing to all modes that can be made using by combining 7 or 8 or 9 tones within the frame of octave (all their possible combinations), the ancient mode has the lowest difference-tone integrity.

The difference-tone integrity means that the ancient mode generates many difference-tones outside itself; we could also say that this is a phenomenological richness in reference. The highest difference-tone integrity has Messiaen's third mode, which is the opposite attitude: it refers strongly to itself. Within 8 tone scales Messiaen second also has low the difference-tone integrity. Investigating scale classes with 7 tones shows that major (and its related) has the highest difference-tone integrity, which is opposite to the ancient mode. Thus, the lowest difference-tone integrity of the ancient mode may be the reason of its vibrating sound.

=== Ancient Mode in Zivkovic's music ===
Zivkovic has developed a highly advanced techniques within the frame of the Ancient Mode (further AM), with several striking constrains. These constrains include:

- chromatic ancient mode
- note movement
- chord building
- scale filtering
- chord progressions

== Awards ==
- Eclat de larme - composition prize at the first pre-art competition in Switzerland, 2005
- Le Cimetière Marin - Swedish Grammy Award (Grammis) on Sonanza's CD Unheard of Again - 2009
- Ascetic Discourse - Mokranjac Award, Serbian State Prize, for the best composition of the year - 2012
- On the Guarding of the Heart - Grawemeyer Award for Music Composition, 2014
- Unceasing Prayers - Nominated for the Fondation Prince Pierre de Monaco - le Prix de Composition Musicale, 2015
- Carin Malmlöf-Forsslings-Award, by the Swedish Royal Music Academy, 2018
- Lilla Christ Johnson Award for Unceasing Prayers, by the Swedish Royal Music Academy, 2019
- Saltö Society Award for Citadel of Love, received by the Swedish Royal Academy of Music, 2020
- Swedish Music Publishers' Award for Citadel of Love, received by Swedish Music Publishers, 2021

=== Other grants ===
- Performing Rights Society, Sweden
- Arts Grants Committee, Sweden
- Irino Institute, Japan
- The Royal Academy of Music, Sweden
- A five-years composing grant (2014–18) by Konstnärsnämnden, Sweden

== Activities ==
- Lecture at the School of Music in Piteå Luleå University of Technology (Sweden) 2021.
- Workshop and Masterclasses at the School of Music at the Gothenburg University (Sweden) 2019
- Lecture at the Manhattan School of Music (USA) 2017
- Masterclasses at Mise-En Space in New York (USA) 2017
- Lecture at the School of Music Chicago University (USA) 2017
- Lecture at the Royal College of Music in Stockholm (Sweden) 2015, 2021.
- Lecture at the Composers' Society (Serbia) 2015
- Jury member for 5-Minute Opera Competition at the Music Biennale in Zagreb (Croatia) 2015
- Workshop and Masterclasses at the Music School of the University of Louisville (USA) 2014
- Workshop and Masterclasses at the Music Academy in Ingesund Karlstad University (Sweden) 2014
- Jury member for the Grawemeyer Award for Music Composition (USA) 2014
- Lecture at the Irino Institute (Japan) 2011
