= Grawemeyer Award for Music Composition =

Music composition award

The Grawemeyer Award for Music Composition (/ˈɡrɔːmaɪ.ər/) is an annual prize instituted by Henry Charles Grawemeyer, industrialist and entrepreneur, at the University of Louisville in 1984. The award was first given in 1985. Subsequently, the Grawemeyer Award was expanded to other categories: Ideas Improving World Order (instituted in 1988), Education (1989), Religion (1990) and Psychology (2000). The prize fund was initially an endowment of US$9 million from the Grawemeyer Foundation. The initial awards were for $150 000 each, increasing to $200 000 for the year 2000 awards. After the economic crash of 2008, the prize was reduced to $100,000.

The selection process includes three panels of judges. The first is a panel of faculty from the University of Louisville or outside experts as needed, who hosts and maintains the perpetuity of the award. The second is a panel of music professionals, often involving conductors, performers, scholars, critics and composers (most frequently the previous winner) who have a particular expertise in contemporary music. The final decision is made by a lay panel of new music enthusiasts who are not professional musicians, yet are highly knowledgeable about the state of new music. This final committee of amateurs makes the final prize determination because Grawemeyer insisted that great ideas are not exclusively the domain of academic experts.

The award has most often been awarded to large-scale works, such as symphonies, concerti, and operas. Only two Award-winning pieces (György Ligeti's Études, for piano; and Sebastian Currier's Static, for flute, clarinet, violin, cello and piano) do not require a conductor in performance.

Only four years have seen no prize awarded. In 1988, the second panel, consisting of professional musicians (which that year included previous winner Harrison Birtwistle) determined that no work was deserving of the award. In 1999, the awarding of the prize was moved from the fall semester to the spring semester due to the University of Louisville's bicentennial celebrations, which meant that that year's winner (Thomas Adès) was given the prize in the spring of 2000 rather than the fall of 1999. No award was given in 2015 or 2020.

== Recipients of the Grawemeyer Award for Music Composition ==
Year	Recipient	Composition	Notes
1985	Witold Lutosławski	Symphony No. 3 (1973–1983)	for orchestra
1986	György Ligeti	Études Book 1 (1985)	for piano
1987	Harrison Birtwistle	The Mask of Orpheus (1984)	opera
1988	not awarded		
1989	Chinary Ung	Inner Voices (1986)	for orchestra
1990	Joan Tower	Silver Ladders (1986)	for orchestra
1991	John Corigliano	Symphony No. 1 (1988)	for orchestra
1992	Krzysztof Penderecki	Symphony No. 4 "Adagio" (1989)	for large orchestra
1993	Karel Husa	Concerto for Cello and Orchestra (1988)	
1994	Toru Takemitsu	Fantasma/Cantos (1991)	for clarinet and orchestra
1995	John Adams	Violin Concerto (1993)	
1996	Ivan Tcherepnin	Double Concerto for Violin, Cello and Orchestra (1995)	
1997	Simon Bainbridge	Ad Ora Incerta – Four Orchestral Songs from Primo Levi (1994)	for mezzo-soprano, bassoon and orchestra; poems by Primo Levi
1998	Tan Dun	Marco Polo (1995)	opera
1999	not awarded		
2000	Thomas Adès	Asyla, Op. 17 (1997)	for orchestra
2001	Pierre Boulez	Sur Incises (1996–1998)	for 3 pianos, 3 harps and 3 mallet instruments
2002	Aaron Jay Kernis	Colored Field (1994/2000)	for cello and orchestra
2003	Kaija Saariaho	L'Amour de loin (2000)	opera
2004	Unsuk Chin	Violin Concerto (2001)	
2005	George Tsontakis	Violin Concerto No. 2 (2003)	
2006	György Kurtág	...Concertante..., Op. 42 (2003)	for violin, viola and orchestra
2007	Sebastian Currier	Static (2003)	for flute, clarinet, violin, cello and piano
2008	Peter Lieberson	Neruda Songs (2005)	song-cycle for mezzo-soprano and orchestra; poems by Pablo Neruda
2009	Brett Dean	The Lost Art of Letter Writing (2006)	violin concerto
2010	York Höller	Sphären (2001–2006)	for orchestra
2011	Louis Andriessen	La Commedia (2004–2008)	multimedia opera based on Dante's The Divine Comedy
2012	Esa-Pekka Salonen	Violin Concerto (2008–2009)	
2013	Michel van der Aa	Up-Close, Concerto (2010)	for cello, string ensemble and film
2014	Đuro Živković	On the Guarding of the Heart (2011)	for chamber orchestra
2015	not awarded		
2016	Hans Abrahamsen	let me tell you (2013)	for soprano and orchestra
2017	Andrew Norman	Play (2013/2016)	for orchestra
2018	Bent Sørensen	L'isola della Città (2016)	for violin, cello, piano and orchestra
2019	Joël Bons	Nomaden (2016)	for cello solo with multinational instrumental ensemble
2020	not awarded		
2021	Lei Liang	A Thousand Mountains, A Million Streams (2017)	for orchestra
2022	Olga Neuwirth	Orlando (2019)	opera based on the novel by Virginia Woolf
2023	Julian Anderson	Litanies (2018)	concerto for cello and orchestra
2024	Aleksandra Vrebalov	Missa Supratext (2018)	for girls' chorus and string quartet
2025	Christian Mason	Invisible Threads (2022–23)	for bass clarinet, accordion, vocal sextet and string quartet
2026	Liza Lim	A Sutured World (2024)	for cello and orchestra
