= Giacinto Scelsi =

Italian composer and poet (1905-1988)

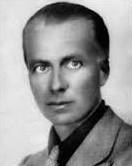
Scelsi c. 1935

Giacinto Francesco Maria Scelsi, count d'Ayala Valva (Italian pronunciation: [dʒaˈtʃinto franˈtʃesko maˈriːa ʃˈʃɛlsi]; 8 January 1905 – 9 August (Note: Sometimes cited as 8 August.) 1988) was an Italian composer who also wrote surrealist poetry in French.

He is best known for having composed music based around only one pitch, altered in all manners through microtonal oscillations, harmonic allusions, and changes in timbre and dynamics, as paradigmatically exemplified in his Quattro pezzi su una nota sola ("Four Pieces on a single note", 1959). This composition remains his most famous work and one of the few performed to significant recognition during his lifetime. His musical output, which encompassed all Western classical genres except scenic music, remained largely undiscovered even within contemporary musical circles during most of his life. Today, some of his music has gained popularity in certain postmodern composition circles, with pieces like his "Anahit" and his String Quartets rising to increased prominence.

Scelsi collaborated with American composers including John Cage, Morton Feldman, and Earle Brown, as well as being a friend and a mentor to Alvin Curran. His work was a source of inspiration to Ennio Morricone's Gruppo di Improvvisazione di Nuova Consonanza, and his music influenced composers like Tristan Murail and Solange Ancona.

== Life ==
Born in the village of Pitelli near La Spezia, Scelsi spent most of his time in his mother's old castle where he received education from a private tutor who taught him Latin, chess and fencing. Later, his family moved to Rome and his musical talents were encouraged by private lessons with Giacinto Sallustio. In Vienna, he studied with Walther Klein, a pupil of Arnold Schoenberg. He became the first exponent of dodecaphony in Italy, although he did not continue to use this system.

In the 1920s, Scelsi made friends with intellectuals like Jean Cocteau and Virginia Woolf, and traveled abroad extensively. He first came into contact with non-European music in Egypt in 1927. His first composition was Chemin du coeur (1929). Then followed Rotativa, first conducted by Pierre Monteux at Salle Pleyel, Paris, on 20 December 1931.

In 1937, he organised a series of concerts of contemporary works, introducing the music of (among others) Paul Hindemith, Schoenberg, Igor Stravinsky, Dmitri Shostakovich, and Sergei Prokofiev to an Italian audience for the first time. Due to the enforcement of racial laws under the fascist regime of Benito Mussolini, which prevented the performance of works by Jewish composers, these concerts did not continue for long. Scelsi refused to comply, and gradually distanced himself from Italy. In 1940, when Italy entered the war, Scelsi was in Switzerland, where he remained until the end of the conflict, composing and honing his conception of music. He married Dorothy Kate Ramsden, a divorced Englishwoman.

Back in Rome after the war, his wife left him (eventually inspiring Elegia per Ty), and he underwent a profound psychological crisis that eventually led him to the discovery of Eastern spirituality, and also to a radical transformation of his view of music. In this so-called second period, he rejected the notions of composition and authorship in favour of sheer improvisation. His improvisations were recorded on tape and later transcribed by collaborators under his guidance. They were then orchestrated and filled out by his meticulous performance instructions, or adjusted from time to time in close collaboration with the performers.

Scelsi came to conceive of artistic creation as a means of communicating a higher, transcendent reality to the listener. In this view, the artist is considered a mere intermediary. For this reason, Scelsi never allowed his image to be shown in connection with his music; he preferred instead to identify himself by a line under a circle, as a symbol of Eastern provenance. Some photographs of Scelsi have emerged since his death.

One of the earliest interpreters Scelsi closely worked with was the singer Michiko Hirayama, whom he met in 1957 in Rome. From 1962 to 1972 he wrote the extensive song cycle Canti del Capricorno directly for her in view of her special and unique vocal range. The writing process of the piece set an example for Scelsi's very personal way of working: developing pieces through improvisation, recording, and then making a final transcription.

From the late 1970s, Scelsi met several leading interpreters, such as the Arditti String Quartet, the cellist Frances-Marie Uitti, the clarinetist Carol Robinson, and the pianists Yvar Mikhashoff and Marianne Schroeder, who have promoted his music all over the world and gradually opened the gates to wider audiences.

Scelsi was a friend and a mentor to Alvin Curran (whose VSTO is a tribute) and other immigrant American composers such as Frederic Rzewski who were residing in Rome during the 1960s. Scelsi also collaborated with other American composers including John Cage, Morton Feldman, and Earle Brown (who visited him in Rome).

Frances-Marie Uitti, dedicatee of all Scelsi's cello works, collaborated intensively with him for over 10 years editing and then recording La Trilogia, a massive 3 part work of 45 minutes in length which Morton Feldman called his "autobiography in sound". It was first premiered in Festival di Como, and recorded on Fore records (Raretone) with Scelsi in the studio and later for Etcetera Records. A more recent acclaimed version with several of the Latin Prayers is to be found on ECM under the title Natura Renovatur. Uitti also transcribed many of the chamber works for contrabass, contrabass and cello, viola, and two improvisations based on the ondiolina tapes that are found under the title Voyages.

Alvin Curran recalled that: "Scelsi ... came to all my concerts in Rome even right up to the very last one I gave just a few days before he died. This was in the summer time, and he was such a nut about being outdoors. He was there in a fur coat and a fur hat. It was an outdoor concert. He waved from a distance, beautiful sparking eyes and smile that he always had, and that's the last time I saw him" (Ross, 2005).

Scelsi died of a cerebral hemorrhage on 8 August 1988, in Rome.

== Music ==
Scelsi remained largely unknown for most of his career. A series of concerts in the mid to late 1980s finally premiered many of his pieces to great acclaim, notably his orchestral masterpieces in October 1987 in Cologne, about a quarter of a century after those works had been composed and less than a year before the composer's death. Scelsi was able to attend the premieres and personally supervised the rehearsals. The impact caused by the late discovery of Scelsi's works was described by Belgian musicologist Harry Halbreich:

A whole chapter of recent musical history must be rewritten: the second half of this century is now unthinkable without Scelsi... He has inaugurated a completely new way of making music, hitherto unknown in the West. In the early fifties, there were few alternatives to serialism's strait jacket that did not lead back to the past. Then, toward 1960–61, came the shock of the discovery of Ligeti's Apparitions and Atmosphères. There were few people at the time who knew that Friedrich Cerha, in his orchestral cycle Spiegel, had already reached rather similar results, and nobody knew that there was a composer who had followed the same path even years before, and in a far more radical way: Giacinto Scelsi himself.

Scelsi was also an idol of Ennio Morricone's Gruppo di Improvvisazione di Nuova Consonanza, whose sixteen-minute track 'Omaggio a Giacinto Scelsi' features on their live album 'Musica Su Schemi', released in 1976.

The music of Scelsi was heard by millions in Martin Scorsese's Shutter Island, in which excerpts of his two works Quattro pezzi su una nota sola and Uaxuctum (3rd movement) were featured alongside the music of his contemporaries György Ligeti, Krzysztof Penderecki, John Cage and Morton Feldman. (Note: The pieces and composers are listed in the end credits of the film, but only "Uaxuctum" is listed on the soundtrack.)

Scelsi's archives are held at the Isabella Scelsi Foundation.

== Works ==
See List of compositions by Giacinto Scelsi.

== Bibliography ==
- Le Poids net et l'Ordre de ma vie, Vevey, 1945
- Sommet du feu, Rome, 1947
- Le Poids net, éditions GLM (Guy Levis Mano), 1949
- L'Archipel Nocturne, éditions GLM, 1954
- La conscience aiguë, éditions GLM, 1962
- Cercles, Éditions Le parole gelate, Rome, 1986
- Il Sogno 101 (Dream 101), an autobiographical book. Macerata: Quodlibet, 2010.

The French company Actes Sud published writings of Giacinto Scelsi in three volumes, the majority of which are now out of print:

- L'homme du son, poetry edited and with commentary by Luciano Martinis, with collaboration from Sharon Kanach. Actes Sud 2006,
- Les anges sont ailleurs, writings on Scelsi's life, music and art. Actes Sud, 2006.
- Il Sogno 101, an autobiography. Actes Sud.

== Selected discography ==
=== Accord/Universal-Musidisc ===
- Œuvre intégrale pour choeur et orchestre symphonique (1. Aion – Pfhat – Konx-Om-Pax, 2. Quattro Pezzi – Anahit – Uaxuctum, 3. Hurqualia – Hymnos – Chukrum). Orchestre et chœur de la Radio-Télévision Polonaise de Cracovie, conducted by Jürg Wyttenbach (recorded 1988, 1989 and 1990; ref. 201692, 1992, 3 CDs: 1. ref. 200402, 1988 2. ref. 200612, 1989 3. ref. 201112, 1990; re-released by Universal-Musidisc in 2002)
- Scelsi collection, vol. 3: Aion, Hymnos, Four pieces for Orchestra, Ballata. RAI Symphony Orchestra, Francesco Dillon (cello), conducted by Tito Ceccherini (recorded 2007). released by Stradivarius 2009 (STR33803)
- Elegia per Ty – Divertimento nº3 pour violon – L’Âme ailée – L’Âme ouverte – Coelocanth – Trio à cordes. Zimansky, violin; Schiller, viola; Demenga, cello (ref. 200611, 1989)
- Quattro illustrazioni – Xnoybis – Cinque incantesimi – Duo pour violon et violoncelle. Suzanne Fournier, piano; Carmen Fournier, violin; David Simpson, cello (ref. 200742, 1990)
- Suite No.8 (Bot-Ba) – Suite No.9 (Ttai). Werner Bärtschi, piano (ref. 200802, 1990)
- Intégrale des œuvres chorales (Sauh III & IV – TKRDG – 3 Canti populari – 3 Canti sacri – 3 Latin Prayers – Yliam). New London Chamber Choir, Percussive Rotterdam, conducted by James Wood (ref. 206812)
- Scelsi collection, vol. 7: Suite N. 6, Divertimento N. 1, L'Âme Ailée / L'Âme Ouverte, Xnoybis. Marco Fusi (violinist), Anna D'Errico, piano. released by Stradivarius 2017 (STR 33807).

=== CPO ===
- Chamber Works for Flute and Piano (CPO 999340-2) played by Carin Levine, flutes; Kristi Becker, piano; Peter Veale, oboe; Edith Salmen, percussion; and Giacinto Scelsi, piano
- The Complete Works for Clarinet (CPO 999266-2) played by the Ensemble Avance conducted by Zsolt Nagy, with David Smeyers, clarinets; and Susanne Mohr, flute

=== Kairos ===
- Yamaon; Anahit; I presagi; Tre Pezzi; Okanagon (Kairos 1203) Klangforum Wien conducted by Hans Zender
- Streichquartett Nr. 4; Elohim; Duo; Anagamin; Maknongan; Natura renovatur (Kairos 1216) Klangforum Wien conducted by Hans Zender
- Action Music, Suite No 8 "bot-ba" (Kairos 1231) played on piano by Bernhard Wambach

=== Mode ===
- The Piano Works 1 (Mode Records 92) played by Louise Bessette
- The Orchestral Works 1 (Mode Records 95) Carnegie Mellon Philharmonic & Choir conducted by Juan Pablo Izquierdo, with Pauline Vaillancourt, soprano, and Douglas Ahlstedt, tenor
- Music For High Winds (Mode Records 102) played by Carol Robinson, clarinets, Clara Novakova, flute and piccolo, Cathy Milliken, oboe
- The Piano Works 2 (Mode Records 143) played by Stephen Clarke
- The Piano Works 3 (Mode Records 159) played by Aki Takahashi
- The Orchestral Works 2 (Mode Records 176) Vienna Radio Symphony Orchestra
- The Works For Double Bass (Mode Records 188) played by Robert Black
- The Piano Works 4 (Mode Records 227) played by Stephen Clarke
- The Works for Viola (Mode Records 231) played by Vincent Royer with Séverine Ballon, cello
- The Works for Violin (Mode Records 256) played by Weiping Lin

=== Other labels ===
- 5 string quartets, String trio, Khoom. Arditti String Quartet; Michiko Hirayama, voice; et al. (recorded 1988; Salabert Actuels, ref. 2SCD 8904-5; re-released by Montaigne / Naïve, ref. MO 782156, 2002; 2 CDs)
- Trilogia (Triphon, Dithome, Igghur) – Ko-Tha. Frances-Marie Uitti, cello (Fore 80, No.6 [LP]; Etcetera, KTC 1136 [CD])
- Intégrale de la musique de chambre pour orchestre a cordes (Natura renovatur, Anagamin, Ohoi, Elohim). Orchestre Royal de Chambre de Wallonie, conducted by Jean-Paul Dessy (recorded May 1998; Forlane, ref. UCD16800, 2000)
- Canti del Capricorno. Michiko Hirayama, voice; et al. (recorded 1969 & 1981/1982; WERGO, ref. WER 60127-50, 1988)
- Complete Works For Flute And Clarinet (Col Legno 200350) played by the Ebony Duo
- Trilogia (CTH 2480, together with Aşk Havasi by Frangis Ali-Sade) played by Jessica Kuhn, cello
- Natura renovatur (ECM 1963) Münchener Kammerorchester conducted by Christoph Poppen, Frances-Marie Uitti on violoncello
- Trilogy: Triphon, Dithome, Ygghur (for cello solo) – 1957–1961/65. Arne Deforce, cello on AEON, AECD 0748, 2007.
