= Yaron Deutsch =

Israeli musician (born 1978)

Yaron Deutsch ירון דויטש
- Born: Tel-Aviv, Israel
- Genres: Contemporary, electronic
- Occupation: Musician
- Instruments: guitar, electric guitar
- Labels: Sub Rosa, Kairos, Col Legno, Wergo, Neos
- Website: yarondeutsch.com

Yaron Deutsch (Hebrew: ירון דויטש; born in 1978) is an Israeli guitarist mainly active in contemporary classical music and artistic director of Ensemble Nikel.

== Biography ==
Yaron Deutsch was born in Tel-Aviv (Israel) in 1978 and studied guitar at the Jerusalem Academy of Music and Dance.

=== Career ===
In 2006, he founded the Tel-Aviv based ensemble for contemporary music Nikel. With this ensemble, he gave premieres of pieces by Michael Beil, Franck Bedrossian, Pierluigi Billone, Raphaël Cendo, Chaya Czernowin, Clemens Gadenstätter, Bernard Gander, Philippe Hurel, Eduardo Moguillansky, Marco Momi, Helmut Oehring, Stefan Prins, and Michael Wertmüller.

In 2007, he founded the international contemporary music festival Tzlil Meudcan which takes places every early July in Tel-Aviv. The festival also proposes summer courses for young composers.

He played with numerous ensembles and orchestras under conductors such as Sylvain Cambreling, Peter Eötvös, Zubin Mehta, Emilio Pomàrico, Peter Rundel, Ilan Volkov & Bas Wiegers.

Deutsch was appointed professor of contemporary music at the Hochschule für Musik in Basel in 2021.

== Selected discography ==
- 33RPM, music by Steve Reich, Marco Mommi, Tristan Murail and Clemens Gadenstätter (September 2020)
- Almost Nowhere, music by Marco Momi (October 2019), Kairos
- Augmented, music by Stefan Prins (March 2019), Kairos
- Om On, music by Pierluigi Billone with Tom Pauwels (September 2018), Kairos
- A Decade with Ensemble Nikel, music by Stefan Prins, Michael Wertmüller and others (July 2017)
- Sgorgo Y . N . oO, music by Pierluigi Billone (October 2016), Kairos
- Fremdkörper, music by Stefan Prins (August 2012), Sub Rosa

== Videos ==
- Yaron Deutsch: Live in New York City (2022), directed by H. Paul Moon, live performance at TIME:SPANS Music Festival
- Stefan Prins - under_current (2021), with Luxembourg Philharmonic Orchestra conducted by Ilan Volkov, live performance at Donaueschinger Musiktage
- Steve Reich - Electric Counterpoint (2020), live performance at Felicja Blumental Music Center
- Stefan Prins - Not I (2018), live recording at Studio Entropya/Perugia
- Andreas Dohmen - a doppio movimento (2017), with SWR Experimentalstudio conducted by Ilan Volkov, live performance at the Donaueschinger Musiktage
