= "Hay que caminar" soñando =

Composition for two violins by Luigi Nono

"Hay que caminar" soñando KOE 20A
- by Luigi Nono
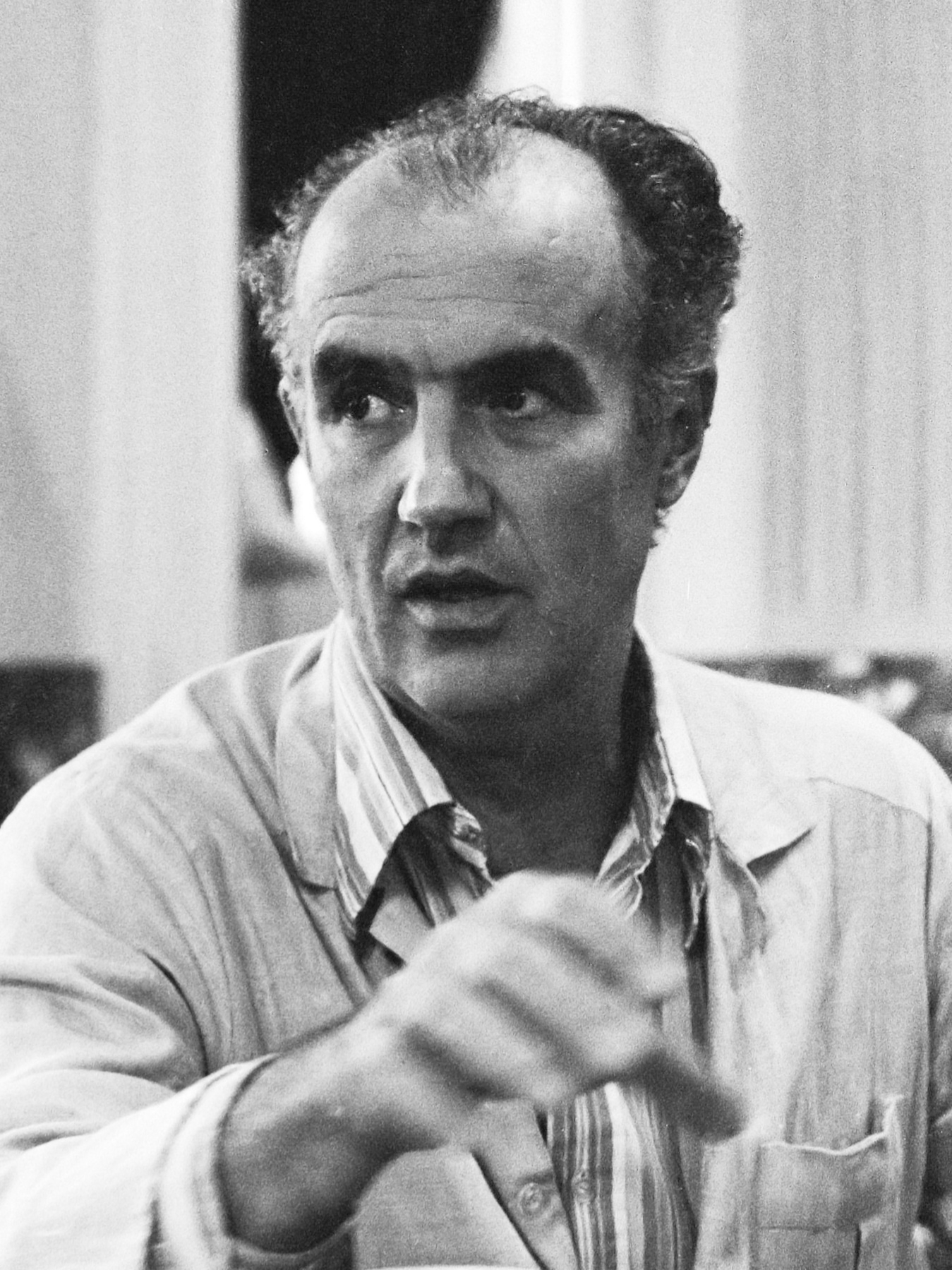
- Nono in 1979
- Composed: 2 March 1989: Berlin, Germany
- Performed: 14 October 1989: Berlin
- Published: 1989
- Movements: 3
- Scoring: Two violins

"Hay que caminar" soñando (Spanish: "We must walk" dreaming) is the last composition by avant-garde composer Luigi Nono, composed one year before dying at the age of 66. Scored for two violins, it was premiered during Nono's lifetime.

== Background ==
Commissioned by the WDR Symphony Orchestra Cologne, "Hay que caminar" was born out of expanded material from Nono's previous work, La lontananza nostalgica utopica futura, and was the fourth and last piece to bear a title related to the "Caminantes", after Caminantes... Ayacucho, No hay caminos, hay que caminar... Andrei Tarkovsky, and La lontananza. This is in reference to a quote by Spanish author Antonio Machado ("Caminante, no hay caminos, hay que caminar" — Traveller, there are no ways, but we must go), which he saw in Toledo, and faintly represents his political commitment and his desire for social justice. The original title also bears an additional inscription: "KOE 20 A", which refers to the house the piece was composed in — Königstraße 20a, in Berlin.

The piece was finished on March 2, 1989, and was dedicated "A Tatiana e Gidon" (To Tatiana [Grindenko] and Gidon [Kremer]). The piece was premiered at the Sala Grande del Conservatorio Giuseppe Verdi, in Milan, on October 14, 1989, by violinists Irvine Arditti and David Alberman, and was published later that year by Casa Ricordi.

== Structure ==
"Hay que caminar" is scored for two violins and takes around 25 minutes to perform. A very experimental piece in nature, the piece calls for many advanced violin techniques, such as playing on the bridge and col legno. A lot of its musical material is derived both from his previous work for solo violin, La lontananza nostalgica utopica futura, and Giuseppe Verdi's scala enigmatica used in his "Ave Maria". Contrary to other string pieces by Nono, the composer asks the performers to play notes with a slight vibrato and never as completely static notes.

In much the same way as in La lontananza, a minimum of eight music stands are dispersed around the stage. Each violinist only has three different sets of scores, which the composer calls "leggi". These sets work as movements and both violinists have to physically move to the music stand containing the next score set upon finishing the previous "leggio". The corresponding music stands have to be far enough so that the musicians do not walk from one music stand to the next in a straight line, but rather walk around the stage. Since only six sets of scores can be used to read music on stage, the other music stands must be left empty or with music sheets that are not going to be used.

== Recordings ==
The following is a partial list of recordings of this piece:

- Dedicatees Gidon Kremer and Tatiana Grindenko recorded the piece in December 1990, in Switzerland. The recording was released under Deutsche Grammophon on CD in 1992 and re-released in October 2003.
