= Clement Power =

British conductor (born 1980)

Clement Power (born 20 August 1980 in London) is a British conductor.

== Education ==
After studies of piano, violin and composition, Power read music at Gonville and Caius College, Cambridge, and studied conducting at the Royal College of Music, London.

== Career ==
After a season (2005–06) as assistant conductor to the London Philharmonic Orchestra, Power was named assistant conductor (2006–08) of the Ensemble Intercontemporain, Paris, where he worked with Pierre Boulez and Susanna Mälkki. Known for his interpretations of the major works of the twentieth and twenty-first centuries, Power frequently collaborates with leading new-music ensembles including Klangforum Wien and MusikFabrik. He has conducted orchestras including the Philharmonia, the London Philharmonic Orchestra, BBC Scottish Symphony Orchestra, NHK Symphony Orchestra, RSO Stuttgart, Lucerne Festival Academy Orchestra, Orchestre Philharmonique du Luxembourg, Estonian National Symphony Orchestra, Orchestre de Bretagne, Ensemble Intercontemporain, Ensemble Contrechamps, Avanti! Chamber Orchestra, Ictus Ensemble, Ensemble Modern, Birmingham Contemporary Music Group, and the Munich Chamber Orchestra. He has been the guest of festivals including Lucerne Festival, Salzburg Biennale, Darmstadt, Wien Modern, IRCAM Agora, and the Venice Biennale, amongst many others. Power has given over two hundred world premieres, including works by Georg Friedrich Haas, Péter Eötvös, Benedict Mason, and new operas by Hèctor Parra (Hypermusic Prologue, Ensemble Intercontemporain / Liceu), Wolfgang Mitterer (Marta, Opéra de Lille), and Liza Lim (Tree of Codes, Cologne Opera). Since October 2024 Power is Professor of New Music at the University of Music and Performing Arts Vienna, Austria.

== Discography ==
- Hèctor Parra, Hypermusic Prologue – Ensemble intercontemporain – KAIROS 0013042KAI, 2010
- Gerald Resch, Collection Serti — Klangforum Wien – KAIROS 0013282KAI, 2012
- Marko Nikodijevic, dark/rooms — Ensemble Musikfabrik – Col Legno 40408, 2013
- Agata Zubel, Not I — Klangforum Wien — KAIROS 0013362KAI, 2014
- ConNotations (Alban Berg - Kammerkonzert), Britten Sinfonia, Mei Yi Foo, Bartosz Woroch – Orchid Classics, 2017
- Christoph Renhart, Edition Zeitton - Klangforum Wien - ORF ORF-CD 3218, 2017
- Edition Musikfabrik 16, Fall — WERGO WER68692, 2019
- Edition Musikfabrik 17, Erbe — WERGO WER68702, 2019
- Elis Hallik, Born in Waves — Ensemble Musikfabrik – KAIROS 0022024KAI, 2023
- Age Veeroos, Outlines of the Night — Ensemble Musikfabrik – KAIROS 0022019KAI, 2024
