= List of compositions by Giacinto Scelsi =

Compositions by Italian composer

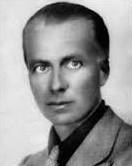
Scelsi c. 1935

This is a list of compositions by Giacinto Scelsi (1905–1988).

== First period (1929–48) ==
- Chemin du coeur for violin and piano (1929)
- Rotative (Symphonic poem) for three pianos, winds and percussion (1929)
  - version for 2 pianos (1930)
  - version for 2 pianos and percussion (1938)
- Suite No. 2 for piano (1930)
- 40 Preludes in 4 series for piano (1930–40)
- 6 Pieces from "Paralipomeni" for piano (1930–40)
- Dialogo for cello and piano (1932)
- Sinfonietta for orchestra (1932)
- Tre canti di primavera for voice and piano (1933)
- L'amour et le crane for voice and piano (1933)
- Tre canti for voice and piano (1933)
- Toccata for piano (1934)
- Sonata for violin and piano (1934)
- Concertino for piano and orchestra (1934)
- Suite No. 5 for piano (1935)
- Trio No. 1 for violin, cello and piano (1936)
- Preludio, Ariosa e Fuga for orchestra (1936)
- Four Poems for piano (1936/39)
- perdus for female voice and piano (1937)
- Suite No. 6 "I Capricci di Ty" for piano (1938/39)
- Suite No. 7 for piano (1939)
- Hispania (Triptych) for piano (1939)
- Sonata No. 2 for piano (1939)
- Sonata No. 3 for piano (1939)
- Trio No. 2 for violin, cello and piano (1939)
- Variations for piano (1940)
- Variations and Fugue for piano (1940)
- Sonata No. 4 for piano (1941)
- Ballata for cello and piano (1943)
- String Quartet No. 1 (1944)
  - version for string orchestra (1962)
- Introduction and Fugue for string orchestra (1945)
- La Nascita del Verbo Cantata for mixed chorus and orchestra (1948)
- Trio for vibraphone, marimba and percussion (1950)

== Second period (1952–59) ==
- Suite No. 8 "Bot-Ba: Evocation of Tibet with its monasteries on high mountain summits: Tibetan rituals, prayers and dances" for piano (1952)
- Quattro Illustrazioni "Four illustrations of the metamorphoses of Vishnu" for piano (1953)
- Cinque incantesimi for piano (1953)
- Suite No. 9 "Ttai: A succession of episodes which alternatively express time (or more precisely, time in motion and man as symbolized by cathedrals or monasteries, with the sound of the sacred 'Om'" for piano (1953)
- Piccola suite for flute and clarinet (1953)
- Suite No. 10 "Ka: The word 'ka' has many meanings, but the principal one is 'essence'" for piano (1954)
- Pwyll for flute (1954)
- Three studies for E♭ clarinet (1954)
- Preghiera per un'ombra for B♭ clarinet (1954)
- Divertimento No. 2 for violin (1954)
- Yamaon for bass voice and alto sax, baritone sax, contrabassoon, double bass, percussion (1954–58)
- Action Music for piano (1955)
- Divertimento No. 3 for violin (1955)
- Divertimento No. 4 for violin (1955)
- Coelocanth for viola (1955)
- Hyxos for alto flute in G, 2 gongs and cow-bell (1955)
- Suite No. 11 for piano (1956)
- Four Pieces for trumpet (1956)
- Three Pieces for saxophone or bass trumpet (1956)
- Four Pieces for horn in F (1956)
- Ixor for reed; B♭b clarinet, oboe (1956)
- Divertimento No. 5 for violin (1956)
- Three Studies for viola (1956)
- Three Pieces for trombone (1956)
- Trilogy "Triphon, Dithome, Ygghur" for cello (1956–61/65)
- Rucke di guck for piccolo and oboe (1957)
- String Trio (1958)
- I presagi [The Forebodings] for 11 players: 9 brass and 2 percussion (1958)
- Elegia per ty for viola and cello (1958)
- Tre canti popolari for four-voice mixed choir (1958)
- Tre canti sacri for eight-voice mixed choir (1958)
- Kya for B♭ clarinet solo, and seven instruments (1959)
- Quattro pezzi su una nota sola [Four pieces each on a single note] for chamber orchestra (1959)

== Third period (1960–69) ==
- Ho "Five songs" for solo soprano voice (1960)
- Wo-Ma for solo bass voice (1960)
- Hurqualia "A Different Realm" for large orchestra, with amplified instruments (1960)
- String Quartet No. 2 (1961)
- Aion "Four Episodes in one Day of Brahma" for orchestra (1961)
- Taiagaru "Five Invocations" for solo soprano voice (1962)
- Lilitu for solo female voice (1962)
- Riti "Ritual March" (version for Achilles, for four percussionists (1962)
  - version for Alexander, for tuba, double bass, contrabassoon, electric organ & percussion (1962)
  - version for Carl the Great, for cello and 2 percussionists (1967)
- Khoom "Seven episodes of an unwritten tale of love and death in a distant land" for soprano voice, horn, string quartet & percussion (1962)
- 20 Canti del Capricorno for soprano (1962–72)
- String Quartet No. 3 (1963)
- Hymnos for large orchestra (1963)
- Chukrum for string orchestra (1963)
- Xnoybis "The ability of energy to ascend to the spirit" for violin (1964)
- String Quartet No. 4 (1964)
- Yliam for female choir (1964)
- Duo for violin and cello (1965)
  - version for violin and double bass (1977)
- Anahit "Lyric Poem on the name of Venus" for violin and 18 instruments (1965)
- Anagamin "The one who is faced with a choice between going back and refusing to" for 11 strings (1965)
- Ko-Lho for flute and clarinet (1966)
- Elegia per Ty for viola and cello (1958/66)
- Ohoi "The Creative Principles" for 16 strings (1966)
- Uaxuctum "The Legend of the Maya City which destroyed itself for religious reasons" for 4 vocal soloists, ondes martenot solo, mixed choir and orchestra (1966)
- Ko-Tha "Three Dances of Shiva" for guitar (1967)
  - version for double bass (1972)
  - version for six-string cello (1978)
- Manto I, II, III for viola and female voice (1967)
- Ckckc for soprano voice and mandolin (1967)
- Natura renovatur for 11 strings (1967)
- Tkrdg for 6-voice male choir, electric guitar and 3 percussion (1968)
- Okanagon "Okanagon is like a rite, or if you will, like grasping the heartbeat of the Earth" for harp, tamtam & double bass (1968)
- Konx-Om-Pax "Three aspects of sound: as the first motion of the immovable, as creative force, as the syllable 'om'" for mixed choir, and orchestra (1969)
- Ogloudoglou for solo voice (1969)

== Fourth period (1970–85) ==
- Il est grand temps for voice (1970)
- Même si je voyais for voice (1970)
- Three Latin Prayers for solo voice or choir (1970)
- Antifona "on the name of Jesus" for male choir (1970)
- Le Grand sanctuaire for solo tenor (1970)
- Nuits (2 pieces) for double bass (1972)
- Pranam I "In memory of the tragic losses of Jani and Sia Christou" for soprano voice, 12 instruments & tape (1972)
- L'âme ailée for violin (1973)
- L'âme ouverte for violin (1973)
- Arc-en-ciel for two violins (1973)
- Sauh I & II for two female voices or female voice and tape (1973)
- Sauh III & IV for four female voices or female choir (1973)
- Pranam II for nine instruments (1973)
- Voyages (2 pieces) for cello (1974)
- Et maintenant c'est à vous de jouer for cello and double bass (1974)
- To the master "Two improvisations" for cello and piano (1974)
- Manto "per quattro" for Soprano, flute, trombone and cello (1974)
- In Nomine Lucis (2 pieces) for electric organ (1974)
- Aitsi for electronically prepared piano (1974)
  - version as String Quartet No. 5 (1985)
- Pfhat "A flash... and the sky opened!" for mixed choir and large orchestra (1974)
- Dharana for cello and double Bass (1975)
- Kshara for two double basses (1975)
- Litanie for 2 female voices or female voice and tape (1975)
- Maknongan for low-voice instrument: double bass, contrabassoon, etc., or bass voice (1976)
- Le réveil profond for double bass (1977)
- Un adieu for piano (1978)
- String Quartet No. 5 (1984)
- Krishna e Rada for flute and piano (1986)
