= Michiko Hirayama =

Japanese singer

- Born: June 14, 1923; JapanTokyo
- Died: April 1, 2018 (aged 94); ItalyRoma
- Other name: 平山 美智子
- Occupations: Singer, Soprano

Michiko Hirayama (平山 美智子, Hirayama Michiko; 14 July 1923 – 1 April 2018) was a Japanese singer, noted for her interpretation of Giacinto Scelsi's "Canti del Capricorno".

== Biography ==
Hirayama was born in 1923 in Tokyo. Her parents were lawyers and she had a good education. One of her first musical influences was the Japanese composer Fumio Hayasaka.

Hirayama studied music at Tokyo University of the Arts, Accademia di Santa Cecilia in Rome, Accademia Chigiana in Siena and at the Mozarteum Salzburg; she soon discovered her affinity for contemporary music. In the early 1950s she moved to Italy. There she met Giacinto Scelsi in 1957, at a concert of Scelsi's neighbor, but she did not initially know that he was a composer. When Scelsi heard Hirayama singing old Japanese songs at a concert, he asked her if she would be interested in his music. They began to work together in 1959. The first work of Scelsi and Hirayama, "Hô", debuted in 1961 at the music festival "Nuova Consonanza". He later dedicated his “Canti del Caprircorno” (1962–1972) to her.

Hirayama owned a full score of "Canti del Capricorno" with Scelsi's handwritten comments and played an important role in the origination process of the 20-song musical cycle. In 2006, at the age of 82, she decided to record the "Canti del Capricorno" again. Hirayama is famous for her "dirty voice", as she described it herself, and her gift for musical improvisation. Her voice covered four octaves.
