= Frances-Marie Uitti =

American cellist and composer

Frances-Marie Uitti (born 1946) is an American cellist and composer known for her use of extended techniques and performance of contemporary classical music. Tom Service, music critic for the Guardian newspaper, has called her "arguably the world's most influentially experimental cellist."

Stephen Brookes wrote in the Washington Post, "The spectacularly gifted cellist Frances-Marie Uitti has made a career out of demolishing musical boundaries. She has developed new techniques (most famously, playing with two bows simultaneously), collaborated with a who's who of contemporary composers, and pushed the cello into realms of unexpected beauty and expression... Uitti showed why she might be the most interesting cellist on the planet."

== Music career ==
Born in Chicago, Illinois to Finnish-American parents, Uitti graduated from Berkeley High School in 1964, where she played cello in the school orchestra. She studied classical music at Meadowmount with Ronald Leonard and Josef Gingold, Boston University with Leslie Parnas and University of Texas with George Neikrug. In Europe she worked at the Accademia Musicale Chigiana with André Navarra, winning their top award two years in a row.

Uitti invented a radically extended technique using two bows simultaneously in one hand, becoming the first to transform the cello into a four-part chordal instrument. This technique expands the harmonic and timbral possibilities of the instrument in extraordinary ways: for example, one can play simultaneously 4, 3, 2, and 1 string, with contrasting polyrhythmic articulations between the two bows. Non-adjacent strings can also be accessed. One bow can be played near the bridge while the other is near the fingerboard. She has used over 75 different tunings in her compositions using this technique, each producing new harmonic possibilities and exotic timbres plus a polyphony and independence of voices that her previous work with a single curved bow couldn't obtain.

Early on, she combined singing with the cello and premiered Louis Andriessen's La Voce which is dedicated to her. Other works featuring her voice include James Tenney's concerto, Ain't I a Woman? with text by Sojourner Truth, David Dramm's Crosshair, Rodney Sharman's The Ecstasy of St. Teresa, Vinko Globokar's Janus, and William Kirkpatrick's Stations of the Cross.

Uitti has collaborated with and is the dedicatee of composers Luigi Nono, Louis Andriessen, James Tenney, Jonathan Harvey, John Cage, Karen Tanaka, Per Nørgård, Giacinto Scelsi, Elliott Sharp, György Kurtág, Richard Barrett, Guus Janssen, Jay Alan Yim, Vinko Globokar, Clarence Barlow, David Dramm, Geoffrey King, Martijn Padding, Horațiu Rădulescu, Calliope Tsoupaki, and Peter Nelson, among many others. She collaborates in duo with Mark Dresser, and with Evan Parker, Joel Ryan, Misha Mengelberg, David Wessel, and with DJ Low, Scanner, and Stansfield/Hooykaas, Marina Abramović, Steina Vasulka, Frank Scheffer.

While living in Rome, she worked closely with Giacinto Scelsi, not only as dedicatee of all the cello works, but also transcribing from his archive and improvising together from 1975 until his death in 1988. Uitti premiered his newly discovered cello concerto at the Angelica Festival, Teatro Comunale di Bologna in 2006.

She was guest professor at Oberlin Conservatory of Music for two years, and was awarded the Regents' Lectureship both at the University of California Berkeley and at University of California San Diego. She gives master classes worldwide for composers and string players at conservatories and universities including Yale, Princeton, Stanford, University of Illinois, as well as having the Fromm Foundation Fellowship to teach a residency at Harvard University.

In 2003, Uitti commissioned a custom-designed electric 6-string cello from Seattle luthier Eric Jensen, which she later enhanced ergonomically with sensors at Center for New Music and Audio Technologies (CNMAT) (University of California, Berkeley) working with David Wessel and Adrian Freed and Michael Zbyszynski. She was to have returned to CNMAT in 2008 to design and construct a 12-stringless meta cello with Adrian Freed. She acquired an aluminum cello made in 1929 by the Pfretzner luthier family. She has recorded and performed on the Mongolian Morin Choor, a custom built Uzbeki Sato, and an original Stroh one-stringed cello.

As inventor Uitti has developed a difference-tone resonator that strongly amplifies the beating and subtle "ghost tone" produced by chordal playing. She has redesigned and built 5 prototype-bows under guidance of bowmaker Andreas Grutter to facilitate her work with two bows in one hand. At the request of Scelsi, she redesigned the metallic mutes used in the String Quartet #2 and Triphon for solo cello.

Uitti was Fellow at Civitella Ranieri in 2021 and produced 200 ceramic resonators and distortion enhancers at Cotto Etrusco for her work Stornelli Storti (working title).

She founded the Bhutan Music Foundation which supports traditional music from Bhutan, music education inside of Bhutan, and various outreach programs. The BMF awards 22 scholarships every year to children who otherwise couldn't afford to study music. Recently the Prins Claus Foundation awarded a grant to further outreach programs in the local schools in Thimphu.

Uitti has recorded on ECM Records, Wergo, Hathut Records, CRI, and BvHaast, JdKproductions, Cryptogramophone Records, Sargasso, and Naxos.

== Films, DVDs ==
- 13AL. DVD with Yota Morimoto. KoK and jdkproductions.com.
- "Alyssa in Concert" Eric van Zuylen feature length
- "Frank Scheffer" Elliott Carter
- "Rescue Dawn" Werner Herzog (various tracks)
- "Solstice" Stansfield/Hooykaas, Uitti
- "Re:Vision" Stansfield/Hooykaas, Uitti
- "De Val van de Goden" Uitti, Koek, van der Meer, Goebbels, Hollandia

== Publications ==
- Zorn, John, ed. (2000). Arcana: Musicians on Music. New York: Granary Books/Hips Road. ISBN 1-887123-27-X.
- "Cambridge Companion to the Cello" New Frontiers of Music
- "Contemporary Music Review" 2008 Improvisation (interviews by and with F M Uitti)
- "Music Texte" The Second Bow 1999
- "Tempo" Preserving the Scelsi Archive 2000
- "Augmenting the Cello" NIME, Uitti, Freed, Wessel, Zbyszyński 2006
