= Francis Ubertelli =

Canadian composer and writer

Francis Patrick Ubertelli
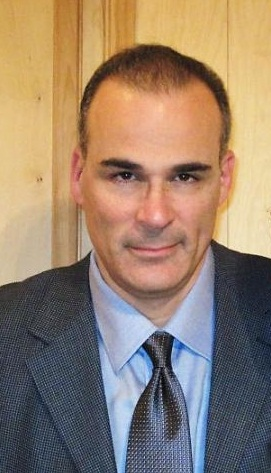
- Born: 1968 (age 57–58); Quebec City, Canada
- Occupations: Composition, writing, teaching
- Era: Contemporary

Francis Patrick Ubertelli is a composer and writer born in Quebec City, Canada in 1968.

== Biography ==
Ubertelli studied composition and musical history and theory at the Conservatoire de Québec under Armando Santiago. After having earned his graduate degree, he completed an advanced degree in composition with Franco Donatoni at the Accademia Nazionale di Santa Cecilia in Rome. In 1995, he founded the Black Jackets Company with composers Pierre Kolp, Juan Carlos Tolosa and David Nuñez. During that time, he attended master classes with Ennio Morricone, Luciano Berio, Pascal Dusapin et Philippe Boesmans. Returning to Canada, he completed his doctoral studies at the Université de Montréal with Michel Longtin in 2000, where his thesis was eventually refused.

Following a decisive encounter, he studied Catholic theology and put a temporary hold on his composition projects. After extensive travels and the publication of his first novel in 2011, he returned to composition in 2015.

== Teaching career ==
Ubertelli was a member of the Ontario College of Teachers from 2007 to 2015. On 9 February 2015, he was found guilty of professional misconduct, with his certificate of qualification and registration suspended for a period of one month; As a result of the investigation, he is inactive, and non-practicing.

He is the principal of L’école Sainte-Marie Mère de Dieu, a private school in Ottawa, Ontario.

== List of works ==
- Litanies of Saint George for string orchestra
- Cantate Domino, Invocations for grand ensemble & soprano
- Demain(s) for piano, violin & cello
- Sol for eight flautists
- Approches for piano
- Délivrance for nine instruments
- DesCoeurs for violin
- Seul in memoriam henri bernier for trombone
- Palio dopo (Opgedragen aan Dirk Proost, geestenziener) for five instruments
- Limites murmures for violin & bass
- Manu for tenor and bass trombones
- Regard for fourteen instruments
- A Franco Donatoni, scritto come mangio for orchestra
- Quatuor 1 for string quartet
- Palio for five instruments
- Voix triangulaires, anamorphoses for grand ensemble

== Prizes and scholarships ==
- "Accomplished Musician 2002" laureate, IBLA Foundation, New York;
- Millennium Scholarship, Government of Canada, May and September 2000;
- Université de Montréal, Fonds des Études Supérieures, January, September 1999; January, June and September 2000; February 2001;
- Canada Council for the Arts, January 1995, February 2000;
- Conseil des Arts et Lettres du Québec, May 1994;
- Monte dei Paschi di Siena, August 1994.
