= Juan Carlos Tolosa =

Argentine pianist, composer, and conductor (born 1966)

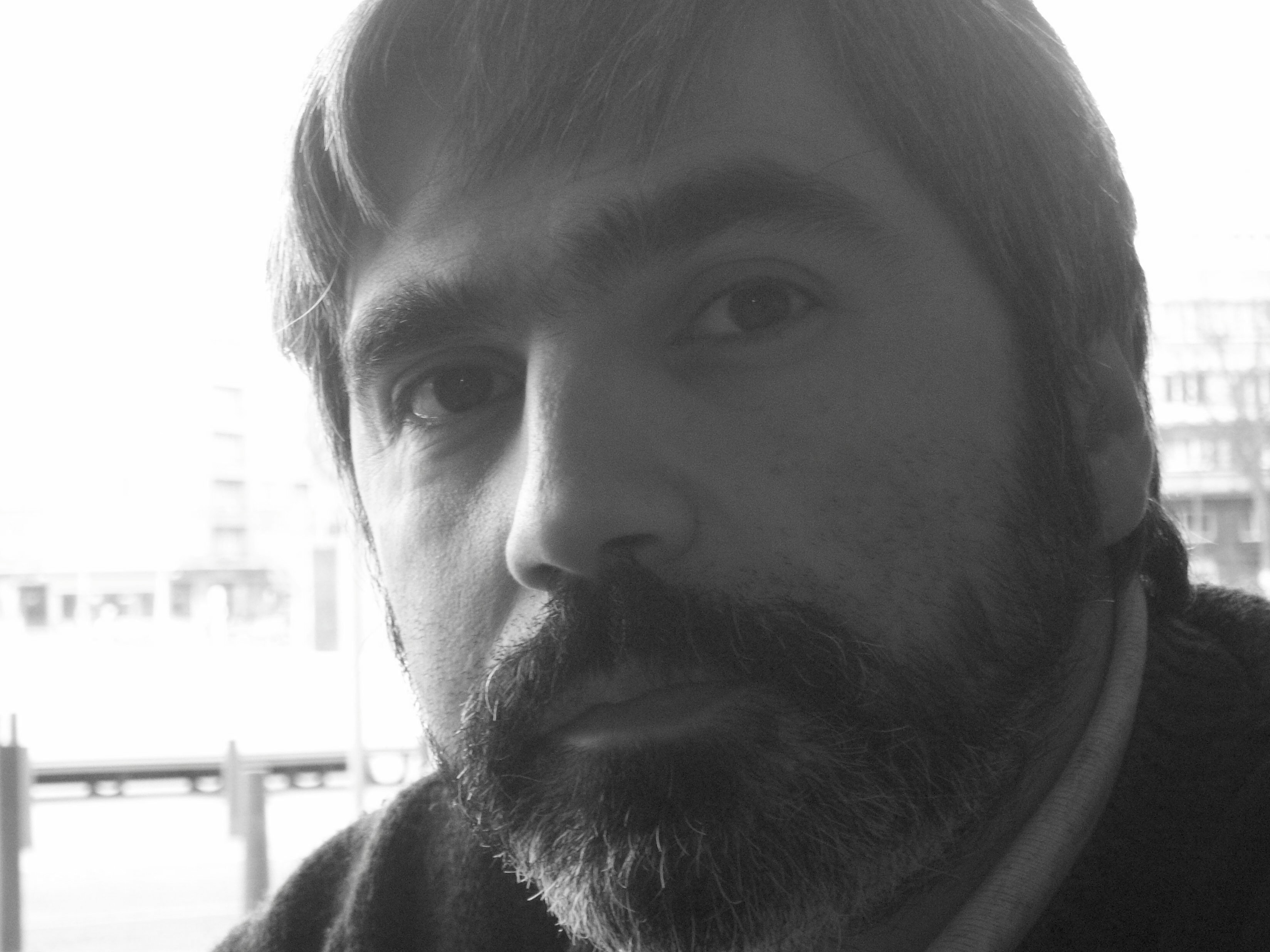
Juan Carlos Tolosa, 2009

Juan Carlos Tolosa (born in Córdoba, 2 October 1966) is an Argentinian composer, pianist, and conductor.

== Studies ==
Juan Carlos Tolosa began his musical studies in 1972 at Instituto Domingo Zípoli in Córdoba, where he received a degree as choir master. After dropping law, he entered the National University of Córdoba to pursue a career as a composer from 1986 to 1989. In 1989, he left for Europe and settled in Brussels. He studied at the Brussels Conservatory, where he received composition prizes in the classes of Paul-Baudouin Michel and Daniel Capelletti for orchestration, forms, harmony, and musical theory. At the same time, between 1990 and 1998, he regularly attended the Ars musica contemporary music festival composition seminars and workshops, with the participation of Luciano Berio, Witold Lutosławski, György Ligeti, Pierre Boulez, Karlheinz Stockhausen, Brian Ferneyhough, Pascal Dusapin, Iannis Xenakis, Magnus Lindberg, Luca Francesconi, and Wolfgang Rihm.

== European career ==
Tolosa created Black Jackets Company in 1995 together with Pierre Kolp, Francis Ubertelli, and David Nuñezañez, and later the Black Jackets Ensemble in 1996. His music has been performed in several countries, such as Argentina, Venezuela, Chile, Japan, Luxemburg, Spain, Belgium, and Germany, within prestigious festivals such as Ars musica (Belgium) or the Pontificia Universidad Católica de Chile contemporary music festival.

Along with his pure music and musical theatre works, Tolosa has collaborated with the choreographers Marian Del Valle (Spain), Barbara Manzetti (Italy), and Gabriela Carrizo (Argentina), as well as with the film makers Giovanni Cioni (Italy) and Paco Aragón (Spain). He has been teaching Aesthetics of 20th century Music and Arts at the Institut Jaques-Dalcroze in Brussels since 1998, and is the conductor of the Black Jackets Ensemble since 2000.

== Latin American career ==
In 1999, Tolosa taught a 20th-century music aesthetics seminar at the National University of Córdoba.

In 2000 he wrote, produced, directed, and hosted a series of twelve radio shows on contemporary music, La Odisea Musical del Siglo XX (The 20th Century Musical Odyssey), broadcast by Nacional Córdoba. The same year, he made his debut with the Argentinian pianist Germán Náger as the Náger & Tolosa Piano Duo.

In 2001, he created the Cordoba Ensamble (a 20 musicians formation), and then the Laboratorio Contemporáneo del Córdoba Ensamble, acting as the musical director of both.

Tolosa began teaching composition and conducting at La Colmena, Córdoba, in 2002.

== Works ==
- Canción del Cronopio for bass trombone
- Y sacaréme la niebla for wind quintet
- El ángel se pudre for two violins
- Copper roses for twelve mixed voices a cappella
- Evaporo el otro que sigue caminando for bass clarinet
- A su imán for double bass, bass clarinet, and electronics
- Klavierkonzert for piano and live electronics
- L'endroit for soprano, violin, cello, double bass, and live electronics
- Obertura for eighteen musicians
- Canto II for sixteen musicians
- Estebnia for percussion and cd players
- Focos for clarinet and five cd players
- Piano Kit for piano
- Pentimento for two flutes
- Dimmi chi fosti for orchestra
- A rear window for cello and bass clarinet
- gente que canta de espaldas for eight solo voices
- Los vestigios for string quartet
