= Ensemble Contrechamps =

- Music ensemble
- Former name: Contrechamps
- Founded: 1977
- Location: Geneva, Switzerland
- Website: www.contrechamps.ch

Ensemble Contrechamps is a Swiss ensemble for new music based in Geneva and created in 1980 by Philippe Albèra. The ensemble's current artistic director is Swiss percussionist and composer Serge Vuille, who took over in 2018.

The ensemble has premiered works by George Benjamin, Unsuk Chin, Hugues Dufourt, Beat Furrer, Stefano Gervasoni, Heinz Holliger, Michael Jarrell, György Kurtág, Jürg Frey, Jimmie LeBlanc, Martín Matalon, Tristan Murail, Isabel Mundry and Rebecca Saunders, amongst others. Conductors and artists associated with the ensemble include Péter Eötvös, Stefan Asbury, Pascal Rophé, Pierre-Laurent Aimard, Michael Wendeberg, Jurjen Hempel, Clement Power, and Peter Hirsch.

Ensemble Contrechamps is regularly invited abroad for concerts and takes part in numerous festivals such as Musica (Strasbourg), Festival d'automne à Paris, Voix nouvelles (Royaumont), Ars Musica (Brussels), Ankara Festival, Witten Days for New Chamber Music, Salzburg Festival, Music Biennale in Venice, Wien Modern, DeSingel (Antwerp), Akiyoshidai Festival (Yamaguchi, Japan), Barossa Music Festival (Adelaide), Festival International de Musique (Besançon), MaerzMusik Berlin, Tage für Neue Musik (Zürich), Lucerne Festival, Festival Amadeus, Bludenzer Tage zeitgemäßer Musik (Austria), New Music Week of Shanghaï, etc.

In Geneva, the ensemble collaborates regularly with the Centre de Musique Électroacoustique de la Haute École de Musique, the Grand Théâtre, the Museum of Art and History and the Comédie de Genève. Ensemble Contrechamps also offers numerous educational activities for school-age public in setting up workshops, commented dress-rehearsals as well as concerts for children in collaboration with the theatre company Am Stram Gram.

== Discography ==
- Contrechamps 30 ans | Label Contrechamps
- Luciano Berio, Points on the Curve to Find..., Folk Songs, Sequenza VII, Laborintus II | Spotify
- William Blank, Portrait | Spotify
- Elliott Carter, Heinz Holliger, Portrait | Fonoteca
- Eunho Chang, Kaleidoscope | Kairos
- Miguel Farias, Up & Down | Kairos
- Bryn Harrison, Time becoming | Neu records
- Michael Jarrell, Trei II, Modifications, Eco, Trace-Ecart | Spotify
- Matthias Pintscher, Solo and Ensemble Works | Neos
- Deqing Wen, Portrait | Presto
