= Pierre Kolp =

Belgian composer (born 1969)

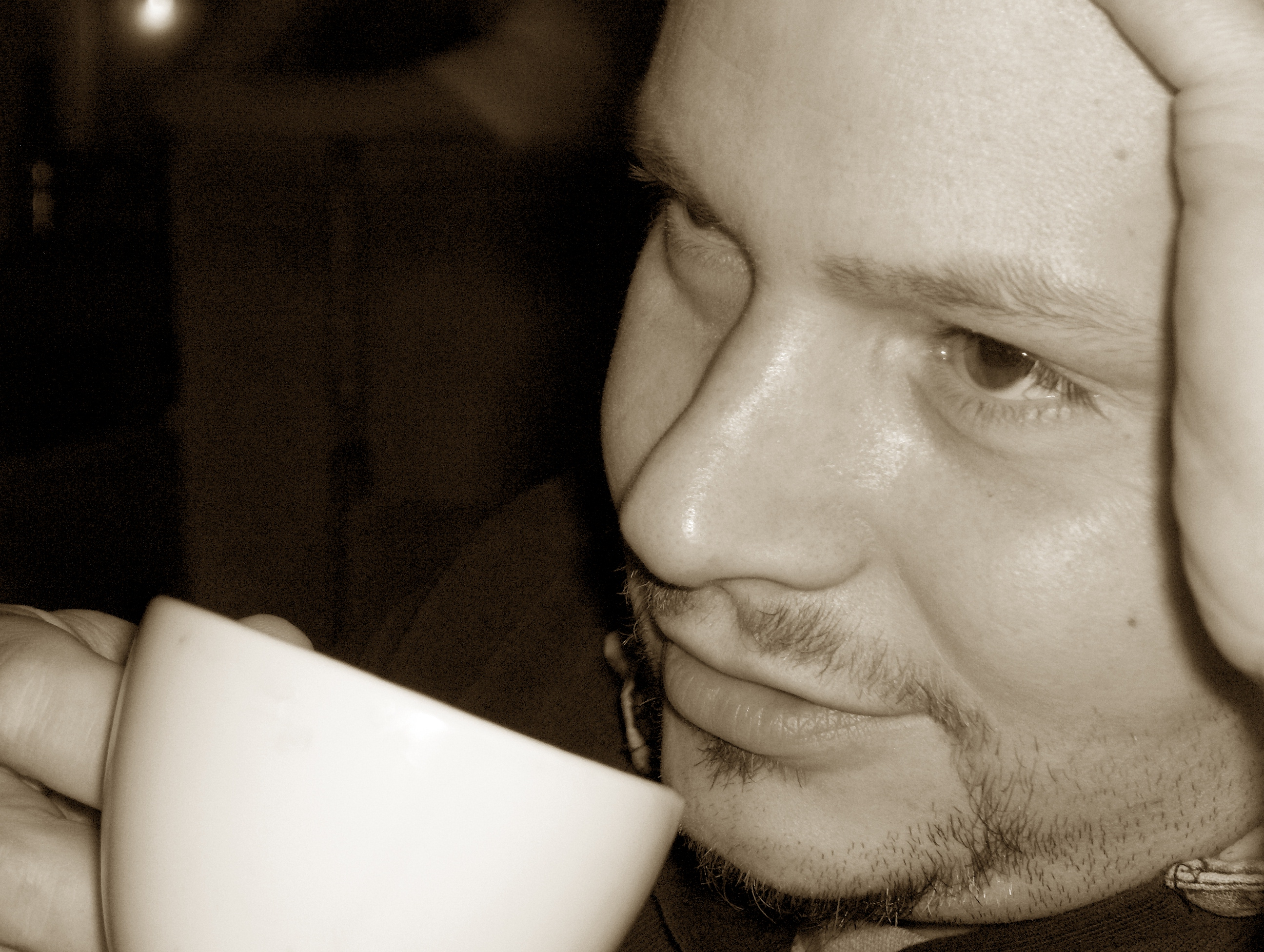
Pierre Kolp

Pierre Kolp is a Belgian composer and music pedagogue born in Cologne, Germany, on 23 March 1969.

With composers Juan Carlos Tolosa, Francis Ubertelli, and David Nuñezañez, he founded the Black Jackets Company in 1995, an international society of contemporary arts based in Brussels.

== Work ==
For many years, Kolp has taught music theory, organology, aesthetics, history, and composition. In 1997, he became director of the Institut de rythmique Jaques-Dalcroze de Belgique, an educational institute in Brussels. In 2004, he became president of the Francophone Association of Belgian Music Academies and delegate to the European Music Schools Union. Kolp has written several articles on creativity, time, and musical spaces.

He gave composition master classes at the National University of Córdoba, Argentina, in 1999, and at the Pontifical Catholic University of Chile in 2002. He also works with conductor Juan Carlos Tolosa, composer André Ristic, and virtuoso Stephane Ginsburgh, all three of whom have also taught at the Institut de rythmique Jaques-Dalcroze de Belgique.

== Catalogue of Works ==
=== Orchestra ===
- Cosmose (2006–2008), 40 minutes
- Ho, mia kor' (2007), 8 minutes
- Los cometas colorados – opera (2002), 10 minutes
- Manimatrix (2002–2004), 25 minutes
- Stop Exchange (2008), 20 minutes

=== Stage ===
- Désirs chorégraphiques – music for dance (1994), 14 minutes
- Los cometas colorados – opera (2002), 10 minutes
- The Eyes of Ambush – stage music (2003), 8 minutes
- Perdre corps – music for dance (2005), 13 minutes

=== Chamber ensemble ===
- Chant contre champs – for 7 players (1994), 6 minutes
- Antipasti – for 7 players (1995), 12 minutes
- Mat – for 6 players (1996), 14 minutes
- Have a Break – for 6 players (1997), 18 minutes
- Passerelle – for 4 players and electronics (1999), 8 minutes
- Mani – for various combinaisons of players (2001–2002)
- Wet Wet Wet Wedding – for 3 players and tape (2004), 3–15 minutes

=== Chamber music ===
- Sept Blasons – for wind quintet (1994), 14 minutes
- Interchamps – for 2 flutes and guitar (1994), 14 minutes
- Speaker – for flute quartet (1995), 6 minutes
- I ching – for flute and guitar (1996), 10 minutes
- Incipit vita nova – first piano trio (2001), 7 minutes
- So-mani dreams are explored – second piano trio (2005), 15 minutes
- The Bowling' Stones – for 2 pianos (2006), 9 minutes
- Plug-in – for 2 pianos (2007), 6 minutes

=== Solo instrument ===
- P as T – for alto (2005)
- Sub-Negation – for any solo instrument, 2 versions (2007–2008), 12 minutes
- Portiques génitifs – for cello (1994), 6 minutes
- Beaver Tuned – for piano (1998), 10 minutes
- Due scherzi – for piano (2007), 12 minutes
- So Slow the Snow – for piano (2006), 10 minutes

=== Vocal music ===
- Eggs – for choir (1994), 8 minutes
- Hors d'un coffret de Santal – 7 melodies for one singer and piano (1997), 12 minutes
