= Das Mädchen mit den Schwefelhölzern =

Opera by Helmut Lachenmann

- Opera by Helmut Lachenmann
- Librettist: Lachenmann
- Language: German
- Based on: Andersen's "The Little Match Girl"; da Vinci's Codex Arundel; 1975 letter by Gudrun Ensslin; Ernst Toller's: Masse Mensch; Nietzsche's Also sprach Zarathustra
- Premiere: 26 January 1997; Hamburgische Staatsoper

Das Mädchen mit den Schwefelhölzern (The girl with the matches), subtitled Musik mit Bildern (Music with images) is an opera in two parts by Helmut Lachenmann. He also wrote the libretto based on Andersen's fairy tale "The Little Match Girl", and added texts by Leonardo da Vinci, Gudrun Ensslin, Ernst Toller and Friedrich Nietzsche. It was premiered at the Hamburg State Opera on 26 January 1997.

== History ==
Helmut Lachenmann mentioned the Andersen's fairy tale "The Little Match Girl" in 1975 in his Donaueschingen self portrait, telling his publisher that he planned to make it a scenic work. After talks beginning in 1985, he received a commission from Peter Ruzicka, Intendant of the Hamburg State Opera, with a premiere date planned for 9 February 1992 and Axel Manthey as stage director.

The work was premiered, after several delays, on 26 January 1997, conducted by Lothar Zagrosek and staged by Achim Freyer who also designed the scene. The production was successful with the audience and most of the critics. All further performances were sold out. It was chosen by the critics from Opernwelt as both the world premiere of the year and production of the year, with addition votes for conductor and stage director.

=== Text ===
Lachenmann used text addition to focus on different aspects of Andersen's fairy tale. One of them is force, both the icy coldness as a force of nature, and the indifference to helplessness and misery as a social force. Lachenmann saw Ensslin as a distorted variant of the girl, who used force and fire. The text by da Vinci added a broader perspective to the situation. The other texts added political and philosophical aspects.

=== Music ===
Lachenmann's music is not a traditional opera. It has no instructions for scenic representation of the fairy tale. Two sopranos, in connected music, represent the girl but do not have to act. Rudolf Maschka compared the work to a Passion visualised on stage. It is reminiscent of a Passion in its narration with added reflections in a bipartite form. Lachenmann used the voices like instruments. The text is divided, sung by the two sopranos and four choral quartets. It is split into syllables and even letter sounds and thus mostly impossible to understand. The vocal technique is extended and included different sounds of breathing, creating a "musical semantic of freezing".

== Recordings ==
- 29/30 Januar 1997 – Lothar Zagrosek (cond.), Philharmonisches Staatsorchester Hamburg, Choir of the Hamburg State Opera, Anna Karger, Andrea K. Schlehwein (sopranoes), live recording
- 5–8 July 2001 – Lothar Zagrosek (cond.), Staatsorchester Stuttgart, Choir of the Staatstheater Stuttgart, Elizabeth Keusch, Sarah Leonard, Salome Kammer (speaker), Yukiko Sugawara and Tomoko Hemmi (piano), Mayumi Miyata (Shō), studio recording, Kairos S 0012282KAI (2 CDs).
- July 2002 – Sylvain Cambreling (cond), SWR Vokalensemble Stuttgart, instrumental ensemble, Experimentalstudio der Heinrich-Knobel-Stiftung des SWR Eiko Morikawa, Nicole Tibbels (sopranoes), Lachenmann (speaker), Yukiko Sugawara and Tomoko Hemmi (piano), Mayumi Miyata (Shō), studio recording from Konzerthaus Freiburg, Tokyo version 2000, ECM 4761283 (2 CDs), ECM New Series 1858-59
