= Pierluigi Billone =

Italian composer (born 1960)

- Born: 1960 (age 65–66)
- Occupations: Musician and composer

Pierluigi Billone (born 14 February 1960 in Italy) is an Italian composer known for works which often "reinvent" the performance techniques of the instruments involved.

== Biography ==
His music has been performed by among others Klangforum Wien, the Ensemble Intercontemporain, the Ensemble Modern, the ensemble recherche, Instant Donné, and the Ensemble Contrechamps and has been featured at festivals such as the Donaueschinger Musiktage, Wien Modern, the Wittener Tage für neue Kammermusik, Ars Musica Bruxelles, und the Festival d’Automne à Paris. His name has also been spread across Europe by numerous radio broadcasts.

He is closely associated with the conductor Emilio Pomárico, the percussionists Christian Dierstein and Adam Weisman, the bassoonist Lorelei Dowling, the violist Barbara Maurer, the clarinet duo Stump-Linshalm, and the singers Frank Wörner and Alda Caiello, for whom he has written solo works and solo parts.

Among the prizes he has received for his works are the City of Stuttgart Composition Prize (1993), the Busoni Award for Composition from the Academy of Arts, Berlin (1996), the Vienna International Composition Prize (2004), and the Ernst Krenek Prize of the City of Vienna (2006). From 2006 to 2008 Pierluigi Billone was visiting professor at the Kunstuniversität Graz, where he will resume his tuition in October 2010.

He receives regular invitations to give seminars on composition and guest lectures (IEMA-International Ensemble Modern Akademie, Conservatoire Paris, Conservatorium Amsterdam, Musikuniversität Wien, Harvard University, Columbia University).

His music appears on the CD labels Kairos, Stradivarius, Col-legno, Durian, EMSA.

=== Education ===
He studied under Salvatore Sciarrino and Helmut Lachenmann.

== Works ==
- 1989: A.AN (for ensemble)
- 1990: APSU (for ensemble)
- 1991: Kraan Ke.An (for singer and ensemble)
- 1992: An Na (for ensemble) (revised 1994)
- 1994: Me A An (for singer and ensemble)
- 1995: Iti ke Mi (for viola)
- 1996: Utu an.Ki Lu (for double bass)
- 1998: Scrittura. Camino (for 36 voices and 5 instruments)
- 1999: Scrittura. Presenza (for electric guitar, pipes and orchestra)
- 2000: Mani. Giacometti (string trio)
- 2001: Mani. Long (for ensemble)
- 2002: Legno Intile (for ensemble)
- 2003: Legno. Edro I – IV (for bassoon and ensemble)
- 2003: 8 Studi da concerto (for bassoon)
- 2004: Mani. De Leonardis (for four automobile springs and glass)
- 2004: Legno. Stele (for two bassoons and ensemble)
- 2004: Legno. Edro V. Metrio (for bassoon)
- 2005: TA (for ensemble)
- 2005: PA (for oboe and five instruments)
- 2006: 1+1=1 (for two bass clarinets)
- 2007: Mani.Mono (for springdrum)
- 2007: Bocca.Kosmoi (for voice, trombone and orchestra)
- 2010: Muri III b (for string quartet)
- 2011: Phonogliphi (for voice bassoon and orchestra)
- 2011: Quattro alberi (for voice, bassoon, accordion and percussion)
- 2012: Δίκη Wall - Dyke Wall (for percussion and 6 instruments)
