= Christopher Trapani =

American classical composer

- Born: 1980 (age 45–46); New Orleans
- Occupations: Composer, guitarist
- Known for: Contemporary classical music
- Awards: Joseph H. Bearns Prize
- Website: christophertrapani.com

Christopher Trapani (born 1980) is an American/Italian composer of contemporary classical music. In 2007 he won the Gaudeamus Award of the Dutch Gaudeamus Foundation. A CD of his music, Waterlines, was released in 2018. A second release of Waterlines by the Ictus Ensemble was named one of the top 5 classical releases of 2020 by De Standaard. In 2021–2022 he was a visiting assistant professor at the Thornton School of Music of the University of Southern California.

== Reception ==
In 2007 Trapani won the Gaudeamus Award for young contemporary composers for his composition Sparrow Episodes, for ensemble with solo electric guitar, which was performed in the Muziekgebouw aan 't IJ in Amsterdam by the Asko Ensemble under Étienne Siebens, with Trapani on guitar. In September 2008, his commissioned piece Üsküdar was performed in the same hall by the Nieuw Ensemble.

His composition Rust and Stardust was performed during the Tectonics Festival in Glasgow in 2015; the Guardian reviewer found it "accomplished and dreary", while The Scotsman spoke of "kaleidoscopic explosions that ... gave structure and shape to its insistently concise material".

Also in 2015, Trapani was among the recipients of a Charles Ives Scholarship for promising students from the American Academy of Arts and Letters, and received a commission from Chamber Music America. In 2016 he was among the winners of a Rome Prize of the American Academy in Rome, receiving the Luciano Berio award for his work Recording Islands, Transcribing Mosaics.

In 2018 the Koussevitzky Foundation of the Library of Congress commissioned him to write a work for the Spektral Quartet. In 2019 he received both a Guggenheim Fellowship and a commission from the Fromm Music Foundation of Harvard University. In 2020, Trapani was awarded the Barlow Prize.
