= Kairos (record label) =

Austrian record label

- Parent company: Paladino Media
- Founded: 1999
- Founder: Barbara Fränzen; Peter Oswald
- Genre: Contemporary classical
- Country of origin: Austria
- Location: Vienna
- Official website: kairos-music.com

Kairos is an Austrian record label that specializes in contemporary classical music. Its recordings have received multiple awards, including the Diapason d'Or. It was founded by Barbara Fränzen and Peter Oswald in 1999, and in 2015, became part of Paladino Media, a company owned by Austrian cellist Martin Rummel.

== Selected artists ==
=== Composers ===
- Mark Andre
- Pierluigi Billone
- Friedrich Cerha
- Osvaldo Coluccino
- Dai Fujikura
- Beat Furrer
- Gérard Grisey
- Roman Haubenstock-Ramati
- Helmut Lachenmann
- Bernhard Lang
- Georges Lentz
- Liza Lim
- Philippe Manoury
- Isabel Mundry
- Olga Neuwirth
- Luigi Nono
- Hector Parra
- Matthias Pintscher
- Enno Poppe
- Alberto Posadas
- Stefan Prins
- Osmo Tapio Räihälä
- Wolfgang Rihm
- Lucia Ronchetti
- Kaija Saariaho
- Rebecca Saunders
- Giacinto Scelsi
- Salvatore Sciarrino
- Claude Vivier

=== Conductors ===
- Pierre Boulez
- Sylvain Cambreling
- Johannes Kalitzke
- Ingo Metzmacher
- Jukka-Pekka Saraste
- Simon Rattle
- Hans Zender

=== Orchestras, ensembles, soloists ===
- Arditti Quartet
- Asko Ensemble
- Berliner Philharmoniker
- Yaron Deutsch
- Ensemble intercontemporain
- Ensemble Modern
- Ensemble Recherche
- Marco Fusi (violinist)
- Stéphane Ginsburgh
- Nicolas Hodges
- International Contemporary Ensemble
- Klangforum Wien
- Kölner Rundfunkorchester
- London Symphony Orchestra
- Orchestra Sinfonica Nazionale della RAI
- Southwest German Radio Symphony Orchestra
- Uusinta Ensemble
- Vienna Philharmonic
- Vienna Radio Symphony Orchestra

== Awards ==
- Diapason d'Or
- Grand Prix du Disque
- Preis der deutschen Schallplattenkritik
