= Ars Musica (festival) =

Founded in 1989, Ars Musica is an annual contemporary music international festival that takes place in Brussels during several weeks, usually in March. Nowadays, Ars musica is one of the biggest world festival for contemporary music. Famous composers were all present: from Ligeti to Stockhausen, from Lachenmann to Huber, from Boulez to Berio.

== World premieres ==
Based on a theme, the programming of the festival presents an inventory of musical creation in relation to its Belgian, European and overseas partners. Several concerts per day have permitted to cover about 700 composers in 20 years of existence, on the average 35 new composers every year. The catalogue of works performed is approximately one hundred concerts per session.
