= Helmut Lachenmann =

German composer (born 1935)

- Born: 27 November 1935 (age 90); Stuttgart, Germany
- Education: Musikhochschule Stuttgart
- Occupations: Composer; Pianist; Academic teacher; Essayist
- Organizations: Musikhochschule Stuttgart; Musikhochschule Hannover
- Awards: Bach Prize of the Free and Hanseatic City of Hamburg; Ernst von Siemens Music Prize; BBVA Foundation Frontiers of Knowledge Award

Helmut Friedrich Lachenmann (German: [ˈhɛlmuːt ˈlaxn̩man]; born 27 November 1935) is a German composer of contemporary classical music, pianist and academic teacher. He taught, among others, at the Darmstädter Ferienkurse, the Musikhochschule Stuttgart and the Musikhochschule Hannover.

As a private student of Luigi Nono in Venice, Lachenmann was inspired to reflect social and political contexts, and to include unconventional playing techniques and noises in his compositions. He stopped using electroacoustic music after working at the studio of the University of Ghent in 1965, but turned to what he called musique concrète instrumentale: calling for unusual and extreme sound production from traditional instruments. He created compositions of many genres. In an opera, Das Mädchen mit den Schwefelhölzern based on Andersen's "The Little Match Girl" and texts by Leonardo da Vinci and Gudrun Ensslin, the performers speak, play instruments, sing and act. Instrumental works include piano pieces, string quartets such as Gran Torso and Reigen seliger Geister, ensemble works such as Mouvement (- vor der Erstarrung), and music for large orchestra including Accanto which juxtaposes a solo clarinet to an "orchestra of noise, friction, and unorthodox sound generation". Lachenmann is regarded among the leading German composers of his time.

== Life and career ==
Lachenmann was born in Stuttgart on 27 November 1935; His father was a pastor. After the end of the Second World War, at age eleven, he began to sing with the Stuttgarter Hymnus-Chorknaben. Showing an early aptitude for music, he already composed in his teens. He studied piano with Jürgen Uhde and composition and theory with Johann Nepomuk David at the Musikhochschule Stuttgart from 1955 to 1958. He encountered Luigi Nono at the 1957 Darmstädter Ferienkurse, and became Nono's first private student in Venice from 1958 to 1960, staying in his home. Nono inspired him to reflect social and political contexts, and to use unconventional techniques and noises in his compositions. Lachenmann's works were first performed in public in 1962, Fünf Strophen for nine instruments and the piano piece Echo Andante at the Venice Biennale and the Darmstädter Ferienkurse. In the mid-1960s, Lachenmann was inspired by Olivier Messiaen who taught in Darmstadt. He worked briefly at the electronic music studio at the University of Ghent in 1965, composing his only published tape piece Szenario during that period but thereafter focused almost exclusively on purely instrumental music.

=== Teaching ===
Lachenmann lectured at the Musikhochschule Stuttgart from 1966. In 1972 he became professor of music at the Pädagogische Hochschule Ludwigsburg, also coordinator of the studio for composition of the Darmstädter Ferienkurse, and began to give a master class at the Basel Music Academy. In 1976 he was appointed professor of music theory and composition at the Musikhochschule Hannover. He regularly lectured at the Darmstädter Ferienkurse since 1978. From 1981 to 1999 he was professor of composition at the Musikhochschule Stuttgart.

He is also noted for his articles, essays and lectures, many of which appear in the collection Musik als existentielle Erfahrung (Music as Existential Experience) (Breitkopf & Härtel, Wiesbaden, 1996). He published Kunst als vom Geist beherrschte Magie (Art as Magic Mastered by the Spirit) in 2021.

=== Personal life ===
Lachenmann is married to the Japanese pianist Yukiko Sugawara.

=== 2025 ===
Several events have been staged in 2025 to celebrate Lachenmann's 90th birthday. The Ensemble Modern has collaborated with him, continuing a tradition of three decades, to play his Concertini, composed for the ensemble in 2005, in four major halls in German. At the Elbphilharmonie in Hamburg, their concert is part of a focus on Lachenmann of several events, including his string quartets. A concert played there and at the Kölner Philharmonie combines his Ausklang for piano and orchestra (1985) with Beethoven's Seventh Symphony, played by Jean-Frédéric Neuburger and the SWR Symphonieorchester conducted by François-Xavier Roth.

Klangwerkstatt Berlin programmed two chamber music works to mark the occasion, Intérieur I for piano (1966) and Salut für Caudwell for two guitarists (1977). A concert of the Goethe-Institut Boston featured his Guero for piano (1970) and works by two of his students. Oper Frankfurt features an evening with Lachenmann in conversation with Enno Poppe and a performance of Mouvement (– vor der Erstarrung) (1984).

== Composition ==
Lachenmann composed works in many genres, an opera, instrumental works for orchestra and ensembles, chamber music and piano pieces, using traditional instruments but requesting unusual new ways of sound production. Derived from musique concrète, he has referred to his compositions as musique concrète instrumentale, implying a musical language that embraces the entire sound-world made accessible through unconventional playing techniques on traditional instruments. According to the composer, this is music

in which the sound events are chosen and organized so that the manner in which they are generated is at least as important as the resultant acoustic qualities themselves. Consequently those qualities, such as timbre, volume, etc., do not produce sounds for their own sake, but describe or denote the concrete situation: listening, you hear the conditions under which a sound- or noise-action is carried out, you hear what materials and energies are involved and what resistance is encountered.

Lachenmann wrote three string quartets; Gran Torso, composed in 1971 and revised in 1976 and 1988, uses the instruments not for carrying harmonic progressions, but as noise sources with strings "scratched, bowed, and struck". It had an impact on performance practices of string quartets. Reigen seliger Geister was written in 1989, and Grido in 2001.

He composed Schwankungen am Rand (Fluctuations at the Edge) in 1974/75, set for eight brass instruments, two electric guitars, two pianos, four thunder sheets, and 34 strings, He wrote Accanto in 1975/76, for clarinet, large orchestra and tape, with a part for the clarinet that is reminiscent of a classical concerto but juxtaposed to an "orchestra of noise, friction, and unorthodox sound generation".

Lachenmann composed the ensemble work Mouvement (- vor der Erstarrung) (- before paralysis) in 1982 to 1984 for an ensemble of three ad hoc players and 14 players, described as a piece "in which musical gestures repeatedly fizzle out, break apart and then reassemble. Nothing develops according to conventional logic, everything remains in flux – a music of unrest and resistance to fixed forms". He wrote ... zwei Gefühle ..., Musik mit Leonardo in 1992, based on a text by Leonardo da Vinci translated into German, for two speakers and ensemble.

He wrote an opera, Das Mädchen mit den Schwefelhölzern (The Little Match Girl) between 1990 and 1996, based on the fairy-tale by Hans Christian Andersen and texts by Leonardo da Vinci and Gudrun Ensslin. The performers speak, play, sing and move, with their actions becoming part of the expression.

== Awards ==
Lachenmann has received many distinguished awards including:

- 1965 Kulturpreis für Musik der Stadt München
- 1972 Bach Prize of the Free and Hanseatic City of Hamburg
- 1990 member of the Freie Akademie der Künste Hamburg, also of the academies of Berlin, Mannheim and Munich, the Belgium Akademie der Wissenschaften, Literatur und Künste
- 1997 Ernst von Siemens Music Prize
- 2000 Order of Merit of Baden-Württemberg
- 2001 Fellow of the Wissenschaftskolleg Berlin, Verdienstmedaille des Landes Baden-Württemberg, honorary doctorate from the Musikhochschule Hannover
- 2004 Royal Philharmonic Society Award London
- 2008 Leono d'oro of the Venice Biennale for his life's works
- 2008 Berliner Kunstpreis
- 2010 BBVA Foundation Frontiers of Knowledge Award in the Contemporary Music category, Fellow of the Royal Academy of Music in London, honorary doctorate of the Hochschule für Musik Carl Maria von Weber Dresden
- 2011 Order of Merit of the Federal Republic of Germany
- 2012 honorary doctorate of the Hochschule für Musik und Tanz Köln
- 2012 Ordre des Arts et des Lettres
- 2015 German Music Authors' Prize of the GEMA in the category life's work
- 2016 Hans-Christian-Andersen-Preis

== List of works ==
The chronological list is sourced from Lachenmann's publisher Breitkopf & Härtel and IRCAM:

- Fünf Variationen über ein Thema von Franz Schubert (German Dance in C-sharp minor, D643) for piano (1956)
- Rondo for two pianos (1957)
- Souvenir for 41 instruments (1959)
- Due Giri, two studies for orchestra (1960)
- Tripelsextett for 18 instruments (1960–61, lost)
- Fünf Strophen for 9 instruments (1961, withdrawn)
- Echo Andante for piano (1961–62)
- Angelion for 16 instruments (1962–63, withdrawn)
- Wiegenmusik for piano (1963)
- Introversion I for 18 instruments (1963, withdrawn)
- Introversion II for 8 instruments (1964. withdrawn)
- Scenario for tape (1965)
- Streichtrio I for violin, viola and cello (1965)
- Intérieur I for one percussionist (1966)
- Notturno for small orchestra and solo cello (1966/67)
- Trio fluido for clarinet, viola and percussion (1966/68)
- Consolations I for 12 voices and percussion (1967)
- temA for flute, voice and cello (1968)
- Consolations II for 16 voices (1968)
- Air, music for large orchestra with percussion solo (1968–69)
- Pression for cello (1969–70, revised 2010)
- Dal niente (Interieur III) for clarinet (1970)
- Guero, piano study (1970)
- Kontrakadenz for large orchestra (1970–71)
- Montage for clarinet, cello and piano (1971)
- Klangschatten – mein Saitenspiel for three Konzertflügel (pianoforte) and string ensemble (1972)
- Gran Torso, music for string quartet (1972)
- Fassade for large orchestra (1973)
- Schwankungen am Rand, for sheet metal and strings (1974–75)
- Zwei Studien for violin (1974)
- Accanto, music for solo clarinet and orchestra (1975–76)
- Les Consolations for choir and orchestra (1976–78)
- Salut für Caudwell, music for two guitarists (1977)
- Tanzsuite mit Deutschlandlied, music for orchestra and string quartet (1979–80)
- Ein Kinderspiel, seven little pieces for piano (1980)
- Harmonica, music for large orchestra and solo tuba (1981–83)
- Mouvement (- vor der Erstarrung) for ensemble (1982/84)
- Ausklang for piano and orchestra (1984–85)
- Dritte Stimme zu J. S. Bachs zweistimmiger Invention d-moll BWV 775 for three instruments (1985)
- Staub for orchestra (1985–87)
- Toccatina, violin study (1986)
- Allegro sostenuto, music for clarinet, cello and piano (1986–88)
- Tableau for orchestra (1988)
- Reigen seliger Geister, string quartet (1989)
- "...zwei Gefühle...", Musik mit Leonardo for speaker and ensemble (1992)
- Das Mädchen mit den Schwefelhölzern / Musik mit Bildern (music with images) theatre music for very large orchestra and soloists (1988–96)
- Serynade for piano (1998)
- NUN for flute, trombone, male choir and orchestra (1999)
- Sakura-Variationen for saxophone, percussion and piano (2000)
- Grido, string quartet (2001)
- Schreiben for orchestra (2003)
- Double (Grido II) for string orchestra (2004)
- Concertini for large ensemble (2005)
- ...got lost..., music for soprano and piano (2008)
- Sakura mit Berliner Luft for saxophone, piano and percussion (2008)
- Marche fatale for piano (2016–17)
- Berliner Kirschblüten for piano (2016–17)
- Marche Fatale for orchestra (2017)
- My Melodies for eight horns and orchestra (2012–18)

== Films ==
- Pöpel, Wiebke; Lachenmann, Helmut; Rattle, Simon; Lubman, Brad; Wiegers, Bas; Pomárico, Emilio; Cambreling, Sylvain; Spuck, Christian (2021), Helmut Lachenmann – my way (in German), [Stuttgart]: SWR, OCLC 1335403343
- Regards sur Grido, directed by Anke Zeugner, France, 2022
