= Klangforum Wien =

Austrian chamber orchestra

- Chamber orchestra for contemporary music
- Founded: 1985
- Location: Vienna, Austria
- Concert hall: Konzerthaus, Vienna
- Website: www.klangforum.at

The Klangforum Wien is an Austrian chamber orchestra, based in Vienna at the Konzerthaus, which specialises in contemporary classical music.

Founded by composer and conductor Beat Furrer in 1985, it is run on collective principles, having no official principal conductor. Sylvain Cambreling is principal guest conductor emeritus. Principal guest conductor is Bas Wiegers since the 2018/2019 concert season. The group is often cited as Austria's leading contemporary music ensemble, and is particularly noted for its performances of music by composers of the German-speaking countries, including Helmut Lachenmann, Wolfgang Rihm, and Hans Zender.

Klangforum Wien has been in residence at multiple music festivals, including the Donaueschingen Musiktage, Wiener Festwochen and Wittener Tage für neue Kammermusik. The ensemble holds the Professorship in Performance Practice in Contemporary Music at the University of Music and Performing Arts Graz. Klangforum Wien records for KAIROS.

Klangforum Wien participated in the work-in-progress Infinite Screen by artists duo Arotin And Serghei, with creations at Wiener Konzerthaus (2013 and 2021), at La Biennale di Venezia (2015), and at Centre Pompidou (2021).
