= List of compositions for saxophone, piano and percussion =

This is a list of compositions for saxophone, piano and percussion.

== History ==
Despite being a common grouping in jazz, saxophone, piano and percussion was an extremely rare grouping in classical music until the end of the 20th century, when Trio Accanto started commissioning works to build a repertoire for themselves. Since then, other groups have been formed to perform and further expand the repertoire, including Trio Abstrakt (Germany), Vertixe Sonora (Spain), Trio Nebbia (US/Canada), TDM Trío De Magia (Spain), Polaris Trio (Spain) or standardmodell (France).

== Concerto Repertoire ==
Composer	Title	Duration	Saxophone	Scoring	Premiere date	First Performer
Birkenkötter, Jörg	Triple Concerto (2002-3)	30'	sop/alto/bar	-	2003-11-14, Theaterhaus Stuttgart, RSO Stuttgart/Peter Rundel	Trio Accanto
Brass, Nikolaus	Void II (2001)	36'	-	-	2006-01-22, Berlin, RSO Berlin/Roland Kluttig	Sascha Armbruster, Benjamin Kobler, Pascal Pons
Cattaneo, Aureliano	Blut (2011–12)	19'	-	-	2012-10-21, Donaueschingen, SWR SO F/BB, FX Roth	Trio Accanto
Hosokawa, Toshio	Herbst Wanderer (2005)	20'	sop/tenor	-	2006-01-12, Berlin, Konzerthaus, Lothar Zagrosek, Berliner Sinfonie-Orchester	Trio Accanto
Sciarrino, Salvatore	Graffito sul mare (2003)	15'			2003-06-06, München, Musica Viva, Lothar Zagrosek	Trio Accanto

== Chamber Repertoire (Trio) ==
Composer	Title	Date	Dur.	Sax.	Note	Premiere	Performer	CD?
Ablinger, Peter	IEAOV ("LÄUTERUNG DES EISENS")	1995	20'		with electronics	1995-08-26 Rümlingen Festival (Switzerland)	Trio Accanto (YS)	
Ablinger, Peter	Regenstück	2006	12'	sop	with water installation		Trio Accanto (YS)	
Andre, Mark	durch	2004-5	18'			Eclat, Stuttgart	Trio Accanto (YS)	Yes
Aperghis, Georges	Trio Funambule	2014	13'			2015, Eclat, Stuttgart	Trio Accanto (NH)	Yes
Apodaka Ibarreche, Daniel	Danse Amoureuse, un quadro di Karel Appel	2015	6’	soprillo	with celesta	2015-03-16, Philharmonie, Paris	standardmodell	
Avram, Ana-Maria	Archae IV					Bucharest Radio, Contemporary Music Festival	Claude Delangle	
Bakla, Petr	First comes the obvious opening gesture, but then the plot thickens, and the sweet background music is not what really matters here	2010	6'	alto	with tape	2010-06-12, Basel	Polaris Trio	
Barath, Eva	...und begriff, dass es ein Traum gewesen	1994	12'			1994-12-07, ZKM, Karlsruhe	Trio Accanto (YS)	
Bermejo, Carlos	Mientras Tanto	2004	12'			Stuttgart, Eclat	Trio Accanto (YS)	Yes
Birkenkötter, Jörg	Drei Sätze und Coda	2000-2001	22'			2001-03-11, Berlin /Complete version Stuttgart, 31 January 2002	Trio Accanto (YS)	Yes
Brady, Tim	Two chords less than a blues	1999	11'	tenor			Jeremy Brown (sax)	Yes
Cacciatore, Maurilio	Radio Jail	2014	5'	alto	+electronics			Yes
Carlevaro, Alvaro	otoño del ángel - un homenaje	1995	18'			1996-06-30, Schömer-Haus, Wien	Trio Accanto (YS)	
Carrick, Richard	Family Resemblances	1997/2012	8'	soprano	(or oboe)			
Cattaneo, Aureliano	Trío V	2010	14'			2010–12, Cullera, Conservatorio	TDM Trío De Magia	
Chaloupka, Frantisek	Whispering-Bisbigliando	2013	12'			2013-10-01, Prague, Contempuls Festival	Trio Accanto (NH)	
Clementi, Aldo	Tre Ricercari	2000	19'		duration either 6' or 19' depending on option taken	2000-8-19, Rümlingen Festival, Switzerland	Trio Accanto (YS)	Yes
Coleman, Gene	Luft	1999	14'			1999–04, Chicago	Trio Accanto (YS)	
Darras, Florent Caron	Extinctions	2015	10'			2015-03-16, Philharmonie, Paris	standardmodell	
Devaux, Keiko	Kintsukuroi	2017	12'05"	alto		?	Trio Nebbia	
Dohmen, Andreas	Versi Rapportati	2012-13	14'	alto/bar		2013-12-16, Köln, WDR	Trio Accanto (NH)	Yes
Donofrio, Anthony	III	2012	35'	alto/bar				
Dufour, Denis	Face aux ténèbres, op. 150	2009	10'30"	alto	electronics			
Essl, Karlheinz	onwards	1999/2000	21'		with electronics	2000-03-28, Konzerthaus Wien	Trio Accanto (YS)	
Ezquerra, Nuño Fernández	Ex Essentia Machinae	2016	8'		with electronics		CrossingLines	
Feldmann, Walter	Comme si le froid	1998	20'			1998, Mainz, Musica Viva Festival	Trio Accanto (YS)	
Finnendahl, Orm	rekurs	1997-8	14'	alto	+ tape recorders			Yes
Finnissy, Michael	Opera of the Nobility	2017	18'	sop		2017-11-01, AFEKT, Tallinn	Trio Accanto (NH)	Yes
Fisher, Alfred	Two tableaux from the life of Isolde							
Fuentes, Arturo	ANTECEDENTE X	2009	12'	tenor				
Fukui, Tomoko	3 episodes	2006	10'				Trio Accanto (YS)	
Furrer, Beat	in's Offene	2022	15'	sop/bar		2022-05-08, Witten	Trio Accanto (NH)	Yes
Gadenstätter, Clemens	Song Book	2001/02	15'			2002, Wien, "Wien Modern"	Trio Accanto (YS)	Yes
Garcia Vitoria, Marc	Interruptus II	2010	9'			2010-12-06, Cullera (Spain), Conservatoire professionnel	Trio de Magia TDM	Yes
Garuti, Mario	Il demone meridiano	1997	14'	bar			Trio Accanto (YS)	
Gervasoni, Stefano	Rigirio	2000	18'			2000–10, Donaueschingen	Trio Accanto (YS)	Yes
Globokar, Vinko	Terres brûlées, ensuite...	1998	25'		with tape and theatrical elements	1998, Karlsruhe, ZKM	Trio Accanto (YS)	
Gonzalez, Ramon	Charybdis’ muse and Scyllas’ bloom	1994	20'		with electronics	1995-05-17, Karlsruhe, ZKM	Trio Accanto (YS)	
Grätzer, Carlos	Alquimia 3 S	1988/2017	11'	alto	(or clarinet)	2017 Strasbourg, Académie Musique Contemporaine, Ensemble Linea	Contrio Ensemble	
Grosskopf, Erhard	Hell 1	1994	11'	alto	with tape	1994-04-18, Trossingen (Ars Nova/SWF)	Trio Accanto (YS)	Yes
Grosskopf, Erhard	Hell 2	1994/95	10'	alto		1995, Berlin	Trio Accanto (YS)	Yes
Grosskopf, Erhard	Hell 3	1995	12'	alto		1995, Berlin	Trio Accanto (YS)	Yes
Haas, Georg Friedrich	Blumenwiese 1-3	2018	27'	alto/tenor/baritone		2018-04-27, Witten	Trio Accanto (NH)	
Hannan, Geoff	Bubblegum	2001	13'	alto		2001–05, Oxford Contemporary Music Festival, UK	Noszferatu	Yes
Haubensak, Edu	TRIO	2016	18'	sop/alto		2016-10-6, Kunstraum Walcheturm, Zurich	Ensemble Werktag	
Haussmann, Karin	I undouble...undouble...undouble...	1998	15'				Trio Accanto (YS)	No
Hidalgo, Manuel	Monotonie, Ich bin die Einsamkeit	2001	9'			2001-03-11, Berlin (Musik-Biennale)	Trio Accanto (YS)	Yes
Höller, York	Trias	2001	16'				Trio Accanto (YS)	
Hosokawa, Toshio	Vertical time study II	1993	13'	tenor		1994-04-18, Trossingen (Ars Nova/SWF)	Trio Accanto (YS/ESW)	Yes
Hosokawa, Toshio	Für Walter – Arc Song II	2010	9'	soprano	percussion optional	2010-08-16, Rheingau Musik Festival	Trio Accanto (YS)	
Jacinto, Javier	Fuego en el Agua	2000	9'	soprano				
Johnson, Evan	Plan and section of the same reservoir	2018	13'	soprano		2020-2-11, Luxembourg Philharmonie	Trio Accanto (NH)	
Kagel, Mauricio	Zehn Märsche, um den Sieg zu verfehlen	1979	19'		arr. Trio Accanto			
Kats-Chernin, Elena	Sarglos	1999	12'					
Keller, Stefan	Hammer	2015	11'	sop/ten		2015-06-10, Biel	Ensemble Werktag	Yes
Kessler, Thomas	Inselmusik	1998	13'				Trio Accanto (YS)	Yes
Khorkova, Marina	klangNarbe	2014-15	15'			2014, Darmstadt	Trio Accanto (NH)	Yes
Klaus, Holger	Farbe und Zeit	1999/2000	11'	bar			Trio Accanto (YS)	
Klartag, Yair	Fragments of profound boredom	2012				2012-07-12, University of St Andrews, Scotland	Synergia Trio	
Kmiťová, Jana	Tras	2002-3	15'			2003-06-14, Takefu	Trio Accanto (YS)	
Kobayashi, Akemi	In der Ferne	1997	12'	bar			Trio Accanto (YS)	
Kôndô, Jô	A Shrub	2000	11'			2001-03-04, Köln, Deutschlandfunk	Trio Accanto (YS)	Yes
Kuwabara, Yu	In Between	2018	9'	alto		2018-06-16, Delian Academy, Mykonos, Greece	Trio Accanto (NH)	Yes
Lachenmann, Helmut	Sakura-Variationen	2000	7'			2001-02-18, Philharmonie Köln	Trio Accanto (YS)	Yes
Lachenmann, Helmut	Sakura mit Berliner Luft	2008	11'	alto	expansion of Sakura-Variationen	2008-08-06, Rolf-Liebermann-Studio, NDR Hamburg (SHMF/anbruch)	Trio Accanto (YS)	Yes
Lazkano, Ramon	Uher	2013	19'	bass		--	--	
Lorusso, Giulia	Here, beyond this place	2015				2015-07-23, Felicja Blumental Music Center, Tel Aviv	Ensemble Nikel	
Lucier, Alvin	Carbon Copies	1989	20'	any	with environmental recordings	1989-04-01, Mills College, Oakland, CA	Challenge	
Ludewig, Wolfgang	Interpunktionen, Punctuations	2008	10'			2008, Mannheim	Trio Accanto (YS)	
Magrané Figuera, Joan	Trois augures (d'après Orlando di Lassus)	2014-15	8'	sop		2015-03-16, Cité de la Musique (Philharmonie 2), Paris	standardmodell	
Maiguashca, Mesias	Deutsches Requiem	1997/99	18'		with electronics	1999, Saarbrücken	Trio Accanto (YS)	
Makovsky, Stanislav	Impetus	2015			with electronics	2015-01-09, Espace Maurice Fleuret, Paris	standardmodell	
Makovsky, Stanislav	Polyptyque or Triptyque	2015				2015-03-16, Philharmonie, Paris	standardmodell	
Marty, Sylvain	Scalaires			alto				
Mendoza, Enrique	Zenosyne	2015	9:42	sop		2015-10-08, Aalborg, DK	Trio ZOOM	
Mochizuki, Misato	Satellites	2020	14'	sop		2020-02-11, Philharmonie, Luxembourg	Trio Accanto (NH)	Yes
Momi, Marco	VUOI CHE PERDUTI	2018	20'		with transducers	2018-04-27, Witten	Trio Accanto (NH)	Yes
Movio, Simone	Incanto III	2012	19'			2012-11-13, CGAC, Santiago de Compostela	Vertixe Sonora	
Müller, Thomas David	Secco	1994	13'			1994-12-07, ZKM, Karlsruhe	Trio Accanto (YS)	Yes
Novo Carvalho, Diogo	tacto	2022	11'			17.02.2022, Aveiro	Vertixe Sonora	
Paúl, Abel	Geografía del pliegue	2014				2014-07-10, Tzlil Meudcan Festival, Tel Aviv	Ensemble Nikel	
Pauset, Brice	Adagio Dialettico	2000	19'			2000-10-21, Donaueschingen	Trio Accanto (YS)	Yes (assai, out of print, Yes
Perezzani, Paolo	Sonata a tre	1998	17'			1998, Darmstadt	Trio Accanto (YS)	Yes
Platz, Robert HP	main FLEUR	1997	10'	tenor	with live electronics	1997-11-04, Bordeaux		
Posadas, Alberto	Huellas	2011	17'			2011-05-14, Valencia, Festival Internacional de Música Contemporánea	Trío de Magia TDM	
Prins, Stefan	Mirror Box (Flesh + Prosthesis #3)	2014	23'	sop+	with live electronics	2015, Eclat, Stuttgart	Trio Accanto (NH)	Yes
Pröve, Bernfried	Frottage	2007	10'					Yes
Ricketts, Matthew	Last Impression	2013	15'					
Riehm, Rolf	Basar Aleppo oder Die Straße nach Tyros	2014	20'		with CD playback and (optional) theatrical elements	2015–06, Luxembourg Philharmonie	Trio Accanto (NH)	Yes
Rihm, Wolfgang	Gegenstück	2006	10'	contra		2006-02-12, Theaterhaus, Stuttgart (Eclat)	Trio Accanto (YS)	Yes
Roos, Corné	Das flirrende Innere	2018				2019-1-30, Kunst-Station Sankt Peter, Köln	Trio Abstrakt	
Sanz, Josep	Triphonie	2007	11'					
Satie, Erik	Parade – Ballet réaliste	1917	19'		arr. Norbert Sterk, 1997	1997-05-01, Saarbrücken	Trio Accanto (YS)	
Saunders, Rebecca	That Time	2019	20'	baritone		2020-2-15, Studio 104, Radio France, Paris	Trio Accanto (NH)	Yes
Schleiermacher, Steffen	Eher was für Madonna & Janet & Björk als für Nicolaus & Helmut & Hans	2001	13'			2001-03-11, Berlin (Musik-Biennale)	Trio Accanto (YS)	
Schöllhorn, Johannes	Sinaïa 1916	2015	12'	bar		2015–06, Luxembourg Philharmonie	Trio Accanto (NH)	Yes
Schüttler, Martin	xerox	2003/2016	10'		with amplification	2017-01-13, Zürich	Trio Accanto (NH)	Yes
Schurig, Wolfram	A.R.C.H.E.	2000	13'				Trio Accanto (YS)	
Seither, Charlotte	visible thoughts	2005	12'	tenor		2006-02-16, Saarbrücken	Trio Accanto (YS)	
Shaked, Yuval	40malige Gegenwart und Rückmeldung	1998	12'				Trio Accanto (YS)	Yes
Shi, Pei-Yu	Gedicht vom Wind des Herbstes	2007	11'		with electronics	2007, Karlsruhe, ZKM	Trio Accanto (YS)	Yes
Smolka, Martin	fff (Fortissimo feroce Fittipaldi)	2010	5'	bar	from children's programme	2011-11-11, Theater im Spitalhof, Leonberg	Trio Accanto (YS)	Yes
Sotelo, Mauricio	De Magia	1995	16'	alto/tenor		1996-02-01, Stadt Galerie, Saarbrücken (SR)	Trio Accanto (YS)	Yes
Staebler, Gerhard	Übungen der Annäherung	2007		or clarinet		2007, Dresden	ensemble courage	
Stahnke, Manfred	Harbor town love at Milleniums end	1994	20'			1994-10-15, Donaueschingen	Trio Accanto (YS)	Yes
Stebbins, Heather	Ursa Major	2017				2017-09-12, CGAC, Santiago de Compostela	Vertixe Sonora	
Steinbauer, Mathias	KLANGFÄDEN - einzeln, op.17.1	1999		sop				
Stockhausen, Karlheinz	Tierkreis	1974-75	10'		selection arr. Trio Accanto		Trio Accanto (YS)	
Streich, Stefan	Move	2001-2004	28'	tubax		2002-7-9, Darmstadt	Trio Accanto (YS)	
Streich, Stefan	Move	2011	15'	bar		2011-05-21, Madrid, Círculo de Bellas Artee, Goethe-Institut Madrid	Trio Accanto (YS)	
Thomalla, Hans	Lied	2007-8	13'	tenor		2008-7-7, Darmstadt	Trio Accanto (YS)	Yes
Thorpe Buchanan, Jason	antistasis	2014		tenor		2014-7-10, Tel Aviv, Israel	ensemble nikel	
Tôn-Thât Tiêt	Moments rituels I	1989	18'	tenor	with synth	1990, France		
Tora, José Luis	Trío	1995-96	10'		withdrawn	1996–3, Teatro Principal (Sevilla)	Trio Accanto (YS)	
Tora, José Luis	de una estela incierta (-Aschenlid)	1996-97/rev.99	10'			1997–05, Saarbrücken	Trio Accanto (YS)	
Tsangaris, Manos	Drei Orte	1998	20'			1998, Darmstadt	Trio Accanto (YS)	
Tulve, Helena	The Night-Sea Journey	2017	16'	baritone		2017-11-01 AFEKT, Tallinn	Trio Accanto (NH)	
Ullivelli, Gianluca	Hrabaliana	2007	15'		with electronics	2007, Karlsruhe, ZKM	Trio Accanto (YS)	
Urquiza, Mikel	Ex voto	2019	18'	alto		2020-2-15, Paris, Radio France (Festival Présences	Trio Accanto (NH)	
Vodenitcharov, Yassen	Le manteau d'Arlequin	1999	10'			2006–12, Toulouse, Festival Novelum	Ensemble Proxima Centauri	
Voirpy, Alain	Offrande	1983	11'	sop	Lemoine	L'eglise de Saint-Merri, Paris	Claude Delangle	
Webern, Anton	Six Bagatelles, Op. 9	1913	4'		arr. Adrian Suarez	unperformed	-	
Wedlund, Frej	Isolated Strands of reflection	2017	8'				Ensemble Suono Giallo	
Winkler, Gerhard E.	Les chambres séparées	1994/95	21'		with electronics/lights	1995-05-17, ZKM, Karlsruhe	Trio Accanto (YS)	Yes
Winther Christensen, Christian	Being Apu Sarkar	2009	7'	alto	perc plays glasses			
Wohlhauser, René	Die Auflösung der Zeit im Raum	2000/2001	14'			2002-10-11, Expo.02, Rathaussaal Murten	Ensemble Oggimusica	Yes
Wolff, Christian	Trio IX - Accanto	2017	28'	tenor		2018-11-3, Wien Modern	Trio Accanto (NH)	Yes
Wolff, Christian	Trio XIV	2024	16'	baritone				
Yuhas, Dan	Trio	2008	12'	bar/alto/sop		2008-09-13, Klangspuren in Schwaz	Ensemble Nikel	Yes
Zeller, Fredrik	Ornament	1996	15'			1998, Witten	Trio Accanto (YS)	Yes
Zeller, Fredrik	Aufgewirbelt	1998	10'			1998-4-4, Tage für neue Musik, Rottenburg	Trio Accanto (YS)	
Zimmermann, Walter	As I was walking I came upon chance	1998/2008	18'		revised version of Kore (1998)	2016-07-09, Viitasaari	Trio Accanto (NH)	Yes

== Chamber Repertoire (Trio plus) ==
Composer	Title	Date	Dur.	Sax.	Plus	Note	Premiere	Performer	CD?
Barros, Bernardo	Spill	2014			+ cello		25.6.2014, CGAC, Santiago de Compostela	Vertixe Sonora	No
Danajloska, Evdokija	Jovano, Jovanke		2'		+ soprano	from children's programme	11.11.2011, Theater im Spitalhof, Leonberg	Trio Accanto (YS)	No
Farhang, Alireza	When I do count the clock that tells the time	2013			+ cello		08.10.2013, CGAC, Santiago de Compostela	Vertixe Sonora	No
Farias, Miguel	Palettes	2013			+ cello		11.06.2013, CGAC, Santiago de Compostela	Vertixe Sonora	No
Feiler, Dror	On ne fait qu’un	1994	12'		+ 2nd piano		1994-10-15, Donaueschingen	Trio Accanto (YS)	Yes
Gaspar, Jacobo	Sombras de Inverno	2012			+ double bass		27.11.2012, CGAC, Santiago de Compostela	Vertixe Sonora	No
Gaspar, Jacobo	Sombras de Inverno II	2013			+ cello		05.03.2013, Festival SON, Madrid	Vertixe Sonora	No
Joneleit, Jens	UNSUNG	2008	8'	bariton	+ mezzo-soprano		7.5.2009, Festival 4020 Linz	Trio Accanto (YS) with Agata Zubel	No
Kessler, Thomas	Schweizer Taler-Schalen-Jodel-Lied				+ soprano	from children's programme	.2011, Theater im Spitalhof, Leonberg	Trio Accanto (YS)	No
Khubeev, Alexander	eARTh	2012			+ double bass		27.11.2012, CGAC, Santiago de Compostela	Vertixe Sonora	No
Knittel, Krzysztof	Ave Vita	1986	15'	tenor	+ cello		unperformed		
Kondo, Jo	Prolegomenary Verses	2018	9'	bar/alto	+ tuba		2018-01-31, Millennium Hall, Tokyo, Japan	Masanori Oishi (sax), Shinya Hashimoto (tba), Aki Kuroda (pno), Yoshiko Kanda (perc)	
Lang, Bernhard	Song Book 1	2004	35'		+ soprano		Witten, 04/2004	Trio Accanto (YS)	Yes
Mendez, Camilo	Cartography of Peripheral Spaces (Interior)	2019			+ violin		16.10.2019, Teatro Galileo, Madrid	Vertixe Sonora	Yes
Nemtsov, Sarah	Tov				+ soprano	from children's programme	11.11.2011, Theater im Spitalhof, Leonberg	Trio Accanto (YS)	No
Newman, Chris	Mushrooms on Toast	1983	2'30"	baritone	+ voice	text: Chris Newman		Janet Smith (Chris Newman's rock band)	No
Quislant, Javier	Silberstimme	2016			+ e-guitar		20.12.2016, CGAC, Santiago de Compostela	Vertixe Sonora	No
Rønsholdt, Niels	Shame	2016	19'	alto	+ voice				No
Schnebel, Dieter	Bachmann-Gedichte I	2002-2003	15'		+ voice			Trio Accanto (YS)	No
Stiegler, Thomas	Lach-Lied der Lau	2011	4'	soprano	+ soprano	from children's programme	rev: 11.11.2011, Theater im Spitalhof, Leonberg	Trio Accanto (YS)	No
