= Marcus Weiss =

Marcus Weiss (born 1961 in Basel, Switzerland) is a saxophonist and teacher. His repertoire includes all epochs, from the beginnings in impressionistic France to the present.

As a soloist, Weiss worked with many European orchestras and ensembles of contemporary music. He has been invited to major festivals in Europe, the US and Asia. As a chamber musician, Weiss is primarily working with his two ensembles, Trio Accanto (Nicolas Hodges, piano and Christian Dierstein percussion) and Quatuor Xasax in Paris (with saxophonists Serge Bertocchi, Jean-Michel Goury and Pierre-Stéphane Meugé.

Since 1995 he has taught saxophone and chamber music at the Hochschule für Musik Basel, where he also directs a Masters program for contemporary music. He is regularly giving masterclasses at various international universities (London, Madrid, Berlin, Vienna, Moscow, Amsterdam, Bordeaux, Palma, Porto, Boston, New York, Chicago, Takefu, Sevilla.). Weiss is a regular teacher at the "Darmstaedter Ferienkurse fuer neue Musik“ as well as at IMPULS (ensemble academy) in Graz, Austria.

He studied saxophone with Iwan Roth at the Hochschule für Musik Basel and Frederick L. Hemke at Northwestern University in Evanston, Illinois. In 1989, he was awarded the soloist’s prize of the Swiss Tonkuenstlerverein.

Weiss is a d'Addario artist

== World premieres ==
=== Solo ===
- Mark Andre ''iv 12'' (2013)
- Georges Aperghis ''Alter Ego'' (2001)
- Alex Buess ''Audio-Konstrukt Arch. II'' (1989)
- Gérard Buquet ''L’astre échevelée'' (2009)
- Shigeru Kan-no ''Work'' (1995)
- Valentin Marti ''Charon'' ( 2007)
- Giorgio Netti ''Necessità d'interrogare il cielo'' (1995–98)
- Giorgio Netti ''Ultimo a lato'' (2005)
- Mauricio Sotelo "Argos" (1997)
- Mauricio Sotelo ''Muros de dolor'' (2005)
- Karlheinz Stockhausen ''Edentia'' (2007)

=== Solo with ensemble/orchestra ===
- Georg Friedrich Haas ''Baritonsaxophonkonzert'' (2008) b.sax and orch
- Jürg Birkenkoetter ''Tripelkonzert'' (2002/03) sax, pno, perc and orch
- Manuel Hidalgo ''Romance de Le Châtelier'' (1994) sax (a/b) and ens
- Toshio Hosokawa ''Herbst Wanderer'' (2005) s.sax, pno, perc and strings
- Hanspeter Kyburz ''Cells'' (1993/94) sax (SATB) and ens
- Roland Moser ''Wal'' (1980/83) five sax and orch
- Salvatore Sciarrino ''Graffito sul Mare'' (2003) s.sax, pno, perc and orch
- Mauricio Sotelo ''Wall of light Black'' (2003/06) sax and ens
- Johannes Maria Staud ''Violent Incidents'' (2005) sax (s/t), wind orch and perc

=== Chamber music ===
- Peter Ablinger ''Verkündigung'' (1990) t.sax., fl, pno
- Mark Andre: ''durch'' (2005/06) s.sax., perc and pno
- Georges Aperghis: ''Crosswind'' (1997) viola and satb
- Georges Aperghis ''Funambule'' (2014) a.sax, pno and perc
- Georges Aperghis ''Zeugen'' (2007) musical theatre
- Alex Buess ''Hyperbaton'' (1991) ttbb
- John Cage ''Five 4'' (1991) s.sax, a.sax and 3 perc
- Alvaro Carlevaro ''Quiebros'' (1993/94) satb
- Aldo Clementi ''Tre Ricercari'' (2000) sax, pno perc
- Stefano Gervasoni ''Rigirio'' (2000) b.sax, pno and perc
- Vinko Globokar ''Terres brulées, ensuite...'' (1998) sax, pno and perc
- Wolfgang Heiniger ''Lamento III'' (2003) kb.sax, per and self playing drums
- Wolfgang Heiniger ''"Desafinado"'' (2005) s.sax, self playing drum and tape
- Toshio Hosokawa ''Vertical Time Study II'' (1994) t.sax, pno and perc
- York Höller ''Trias'' (2001) s.sax, pno, perc
- Rudolf Kelterborn ''Musik in vier Sätzen'' (2014/15) viola and satb
- Thomas Kessler ''Is it?'' (2002) soprano and s.sax
- Jo Kondo ''A Shrub'' (2000) a.sax, pno and marimba
- Helmut Lachenmann Sakura (2000) a.sax, pno, perc
- Bernhard Lang ''Song Book'' (2004) voice, sax, pno, perc
- Fabien Lévy ''Towards the door we never opened'' (2012) satb
- Thomas Müller ''Secco'' (1993) sax, pno, perc
- Giorgio Netti ''avvicinamento'' (1998) satb
- Giorgio Netti ''due lune pù in là'' (2001) cl, sax, vcl, pno and perc
- Brice Pauset ''Adagio dialettico'' (2000) s.sax, pno and perc
- Stefan Prins ''Mirror Box (Flesh+Prosthesis #3)'' (2014) sax, pno, perc and electr
- Wolfgang Rihm ''Gegenstück'' (2006) kb.sax, pno and perc
- Yuval Shaked ''40malige Gegenwart und Rueckmeldung'' (1998) sax, pno, per
- Karlheinz Stockhausen ''Erwachen'' (2007) s.sax, trp and vlc
- Hans Thomalla ''Fracking'' (2013) a.sax and string trio
- Hans Thomalla ''Lied'' (2017/8) t.sax, pno, perc
- Manos Tsangaris ''3 Orte'' (1998) sax, pno, perc
- Walter Zimmermann ''The Paradoxes of Love'' (1987) soprano and s.sax

== Publications ==
- The Techniques of Saxophone Playing (2010) published by Bärenreiter ISBN 978-3-7618-2114-5

== Recordings ==
- Georges Aperghis "works for saxophone and viola“ (0012942KAI, Kairos/Vienna)
- Karlheinz Stockhausen "Edentia“ (Stockhausen Verlag CD 98)
- Marcus Weiss "Swiss contemporary music for saxophone“ (MGB CTS-M 86)
- So near so far - Trio Accanto (edition zeitklang)
- Vykintas Baltakas (KAIROS/Vienna, 0015004KAI)
- J.M.Staud Portrait (KAIROS/Vienna (0012672KAI, Vienna)
- Sciarrino "Pagine“ Xasax (ZIG-ZAG TERRITORIES PARIS, ZZT 031001)
- Mauricio Sotelo with Musik-Fabrik (0012832KAI, Kairos/Vienna)
- Giorgio Netti "necessita d’interrogare il cielo“ (DURIAN Vienna, 020-2, LC 02520)
- Trio Accanto (assai, 222502 – MU750)
- Mark Andre (12732KAI, Kairos/Vienna)
- Elena Mendoza (0012882KAI, Kairos/Vienna)
- CONQUEST OF MELODY hat(now)ART CD 6178 (1997)
- ARS SUBTILIOR Xasax hat(now)ART 107 (1998)
- KYA Music by Giacinto Scelsi hat(now)ART 117 (1999)
- Counterpoise Xasax and Trio Accanto hat(now)ART 136 (2000)
- XASAX EROL Records 7019 (1994)
- Alfred Zimmerlin (Musiques suisses, MGB CTS-M 115)
- Hanspeter Kyburz Klangforum MGB CTS-M 52 (1997)
- Neue Musik für Saxophon XOPF Records 10 (1991)
- Detlev Müller-Siemens WERGO, WER 6648 2 (1999)
- MUSIKFABRIK NRW
- "Traum“ by Gerhard Staebler CPO 999 259 2 (1994)
- Nikolaus A. Huber BVHAAST CD 9407 (1994)
