= Trio Accanto =

German contemporary piano trio

Trio Accanto is a contemporary piano trio formed of Marcus Weiss (saxophone), Nicolas Hodges (piano) and Christian Dierstein (percussion). It is based in Freiburg, Germany.

== History ==
Trio Accanto was formed as the result of a discussion between Marcus Weiss and Yukiko Sugawara in 1992. "It happened on the way home from the Witten Days for New Chamber Music in 1992. I talked a lot with Yukiko during the trip, and we came up with the idea for this combination of instruments. [...] I was especially interested in having a fixed ensemble in order to play pieces a number of times, because at that time I was playing in larger ensembles where only a few pieces with saxophone occurred in the concerts and these programs were often just played once." The trio performed for the first time in 1994. Christian Dierstein was invited to be the percussionist after the first few concerts which had featured Edith Salmen-Weber in that role. The first concert with Christian Dierstein was at Donaueschingen in 1994.

Nicolas Hodges took over the role of pianist in 2013, having known Dierstein and Weiss since 2000. He succeeded Yukiko Sugawara who had retired from the group after their performance of Aureliano Cattaneo's trio-concerto Blut with the SWR Sinfonieorchester Baden-Baden Freiburg under François-Xavier Roth at Donaueschingen in 2012. The first performance of the trio with Hodges took place on 1 November 2013 in Prague, at the Contempuls Festival, in a programme including works by Toshio Hosokawa, Jo Kondo, Brice Pauset and Hans Thomalla.

Although the individual members are based in Basel, Stuttgart and Freiburg, the trio rehearses solely in Freiburg, which it considers its home.

In addition to concerts, Trio Accanto has coached chamber music at Time of Music Festival, Viitasaari, and IMPULS Academy, Graz.

== Repertoire ==
The scoring of saxophone, piano and percussion is common in jazz but uncommon in classical music. Trio Accanto has steadily built a repertoire of about 100 works for this scoring (including a handful of concertos). Some composers who have written for Trio Accanto include Mark Andre, Georges Aperghis, Aldo Clementi, Michael Finnissy, Stefano Gervasoni, Vinko Globokar, Erhard Grosskopf, Georg Friedrich Haas, Toshio Hosokawa, Evan Johnson, Thomas Kessler, Marina Khorkova, Jo Kondo, Helmut Lachenmann, Marco Momi, Brice Pauset, Stefan Prins, Rolf Riehm, Wolfgang Rihm, Johannes Schöllhorn, Martin Schüttler, Salvatore Sciarrino, Mauricio Sotelo, Helena Tulve and Christian Wolff. For details of the repertoire Trio Accanto has largely created, see List of compositions for saxophone, piano and percussion.

Composers currently writing for Trio Accanto include Beat Furrer, Misato Mochizuki, Rebecca Saunders and Mikel Urquiza. Several of these commissions are supported by the Ernst von Siemens Musikstiftung.

Trio Accanto plays exclusively works for the three instruments together. The group's members do not play solos or duos in trio concerts, nor does the trio play with additional guests artists.

In the past there have been projects with voice, including works by Bernhard Lang and Dieter Schnebel. These are however no longer in the active repertoire of the Trio. Similarly, in the past members have played solo works during the concerts. For example, on 6 August 2008, at the NDR Rolf-Liebermann-Studio in Hamburg (during the Schleswig-Holstein Musik Festival), Marcus Weiss gave the world premiere of Stockhausen's EDENTIA for soprano saxophone and electronics (from KLANG). (In the same concert the trio gave the premiere of Lachenmann's Berliner Kirschblüten.)

Trio Accanto has been very active in education, promoting tours of several different children's programmes, including specially written works by Helmut Lachenmann, Martin Smolka, Thomas Kessler and others. These works are still in the trio's repertoire, in as much as they fit into the current programming concept.

== Recordings ==
Trio Accanto has over the years made many studio recordings of new works, for radio. Several of these were collected onto two CDs, on Assai (2003, featuring works by Mauricio Sotelo, Stefano Gervasoni, Toshio Hosokawa and Brice Pauset) and on Zeitklang (2009, featuring works by Jörg Birkenkötter, Erhard Großkopf, Manuel Hidalgo, Jo Kondo and Bernfried Pröve). The trio has released many other individual performances on other CDs.

Trio Accanto have in recent years begun recording the highlights of its repertoire for Wergo, in purpose-made studio recordings. The first of these, Funambules, was released in December 2016 and featured music by Georges Aperghis, Rolf Riehm, Johannes Schöllhorn and Stefan Prins, all pieces commissioned by the trio in the first year of Hodges' membership. The second, Songs and Poems, was released in April 2018 and features music by Aldo Clementi, Andreas Dohmen, Wolfgang Rihm, Hans Thomalla and Walter Zimmermann, all of which (apart from Dohmen) are major works from the Trio's "old repertoire" which were not recorded by the Trio in earlier decades. The third CD, Other Stories was released in April 2020, and includes four previously unrecorded works by Helmut Lachenmann – two versions of Sakura Variations for trio, plus the solo piano versions of Marche Fatale and Berliner Kirschblüten – along with trio works by Michael Finnissy (Opera of the Nobility), Yu Kuwabara, Martin Schüttler and Martin Smolka.

A fourth CD has been recorded, solely consisting of works by Christian Wolff, including Trio IX – Accanto and recent Exercises. With Hodges, the Trio has also released recordings of works by Marina Khorkova and Evan Johnson.

== Members ==
- Marcus Weiss (saxophone) since 1994
- Stefan Wirth (piano) since 2025
- Christian Dierstein (percussion) since 1994

== Former members ==
- Edith Salmen-Weber (percussion) 1994
- Yukiko Sugawara (piano) 1994–2012
- Nicolas Hodges (piano) 2013-2025

== See also ==
- List of compositions for saxophone, piano and percussion

== Bibliography ==
- Jim Igor Kallenberg: "Intergalactic mutant music: The music of Christian Wolff and the politics of 1968. Christian Wolff in conversation with Jim Igor Kallenberg", Wien Modern 31: Sicherheit. 28.10.-30.11.2018. Essays (Festivalkatalog Band 2), pp. 90–95, esp. p. 91 on Trio Accanto and Wolff's Trio IX – Accanto.
