= Nicolas Hodges Studies Project =

Nicolas Hodges Studies Project was a music project to commission 12 piano studies from 12 different international composers. The studies were presented over the period 2010-2014.

== Content ==
The twelve studies are:

- Mark Andre: iv 11b
- Brian Ferneyhough: Quirl
- Michael Finnissy: Preambule zu "Carnaval", gefolgt von der ersten und zweiten symphonischen Etüde nach Schumann
- Luca Francesconi: Etude No. 2
- Beat Furrer: Studie Nr. 1
- Toshio Hosokawa: Study No. 1
- Isabel Mundry: Study (withdrawn for revision)
- Brice Pauset: Etude No. 1
- Frederic Rzewski: Etude
- Rebecca Saunders: Shadow
- Bent Sørensen: Und die Sonne geht auf (Choralstudie) - became part of Twelve Nocturnes (2000-2014)
- Charles Wuorinen: Etude (for chords and dynamic balance)

== History ==
The pianist Nicolas Hodges initiated the project in an attempt to provide piano students with alternatives to the Ligeti Etudes, which have been widely performed in the years since the composer's death. The composers were chosen with a view to providing as much range as possible within contemporary classical music.

The works were commissioned in groups. First those by Finnissy, Francesconi, Mundry, Rzewski were commissioned by Philharmonie Luxembourg and then first performed there by Nicolas Hodges in June 2010. Then those by Andre, Furrer, Hosokawa, Pauset, Sorenson and Wuorinen were commission by the Busoni Competition, Bolzano and then first performed in the Busoni Festival by Nicolas Hodges on 26 August 2011. The study by Saunders was premiered by Nicolas Hodges at the Salzburg Biennale 2013. Finally, the study by Ferneyhough was commissioned by SWR Eclat Festival, and premiered there by Hodges in February 2014.

== Recordings ==
So far only the works by Andre, Ferneyhough, Furrer, Hosokawa and Wuorinen have been recorded.
