= Sakura-Variationen =

- Trio by Helmut Lachenmann
- Year: 2000
- Form: variations
- Based on: Sakura Sakura
- Performed: 18 February 2001: Cologne
- Published: 2000
- Duration: 6 min
- Scoring: saxophone; piano; percussion

Sakura-Variationen (Sakura Variations) is a 2000 trio composition scored for saxophone, piano, and percussion by Helmut Lachenmann. It is written in the form of variations on a Japanese folk song about the cherry blossom called "Sakura Sakura". It was published by Breitkopf & Härtel. In 2008, Lachenmann expanded the work to Sakura mit Berliner Luft.

== History ==
=== Original version ===
Lachenmann composed the work for a concert for children at the Kölner Philharmonie, given by Trio Accanto which at the time included his wife Yukiko Sugawara as pianist. He based the composition on a traditional Japanese folk song about the cherry blossom, "Sakura Sakura", and wrote variations for saxophone, piano and percussion.

The composer writes that he takes children seriously, and therefore composed a piece that is cheerful and serious. He comments further:

The exotic inflections of the sadly cheerful Japanese folk and children's song which conjures up the connection of pure beauty and inevitable transitoriness in the symbol of the cherry blossoms, is embedded into the functional-harmonic practice of the European musical tradition.

Towards the end, the music becomes "pseudo-dramatic", with piano clusters, and "an almost ecstatic improvisation" of the saxophone.

The trio was premiered by the Trio Accanto in Cologne on 18 February 2001. The duration is given as 6 minutes. It was published by Breitkopf & Härtel.

=== Expanded version ===
Lachenmann returned to the work in 2008 and produced a new version, Sakura mit Berliner Luft, lasting 11 minutes. Trio Accanto gave the first performance – under the title Berliner Kirschblüten – on 6 August 2008, at the NDR Rolf-Liebermann-Studio in Hamburg (during the Schleswig-Holstein Musik Festival). That title has since been taken by a solo piano work.

In this version Lachenmann also quoted the song "Berliner Luft" which Paul Lincke had composed, originally for an operetta. Lincke's heirs protested because of copyright concerns, and further performances were disallowed. While Sakura mit Berliner Luft was programmed in Linz on 7 May 2009 as part of the Festival 4020, again by the Trio Accanto (and under the final title), this performance is thought not to have gone ahead.

Lincke went out of copyright on 1 January 2017, enabling further performances of such works as Lachenmann's. Breitkopf immediately announced the publication of the expanded trio, but it has not appeared. In 2019 Trio Accanto recorded both versions. Helmut Lachenmann was present for the recordings, and sang the folksong line at the start. The recordings were released on CD in 2020.

=== Later history ===
Sakura Variationen was played by Trio Accanto (at that time Marcus Weiss (saxophone), Yukiko Sugawara (piano), and Christian Dierstein (percussion)) on 16 August 2010 at the Rheingau Musik Festival, when the 80th birthday of Walter Fink was celebrated by chamber music of living composers, including Toshio Hosokawa, Volker David Kirchner, Wolfgang Rihm, and Jörg Widmann.
