= Yukiko Sugawara =

Japanese pianist

Yukiko Sugawara is a Japanese pianist born in Sapporo.

== Life ==
She first studied piano with Aiko Iguchi at the Toho Gakuen School of Music in Tokyo. She continued her studies in Germany with Hans-Erich Riebensahm in Berlin and Aloys Kontarsky in Cologne. Sugawara has been awarded the Kranichstein Prize.

Sugawara is married to German composer Helmut Lachenmann.

As a soloist, she has played with Pierre Boulez, Péter Eötvös, Michael Gielen, Hans Zender, Sylvain Cambreling and Lothar Zagrosek. Many composers have written works for her.

Sugawara is a chamber musician who has played with the Ensemble Recherche as well as in duet with violinist Asako Urushihara.

She has also played with Christian Dierstein and Marcus Weiss.

Sugawara plays in many European festivals of contemporary music, such as the Donaueschingen Festival, the Holland Festival, the Berlin Festival, the Berlin Biennale, the Festival d’automne à Paris, the Warsaw Autumn Festival, the Festival Archipel de Genève, the Huddersfield Music Festival and the Ars Musica Festival in Brussels.

She also plays in the rest of the world, notably in Chicago, New York, Tokyo, Kyoto and also in the Akiyoshidai Quasi-National Park.

== Ensembles ==
Along with Marcus Weiss, Sugawara founded Trio Accanto in 1994.

== Works ==
Among her many CD productions are recordings of works by Helmut Lachenmann and Mark Andre.

She also records for three important labels: "Wergo", "Col Legno" and "Kairos".
