= Christian Dierstein =

German musician

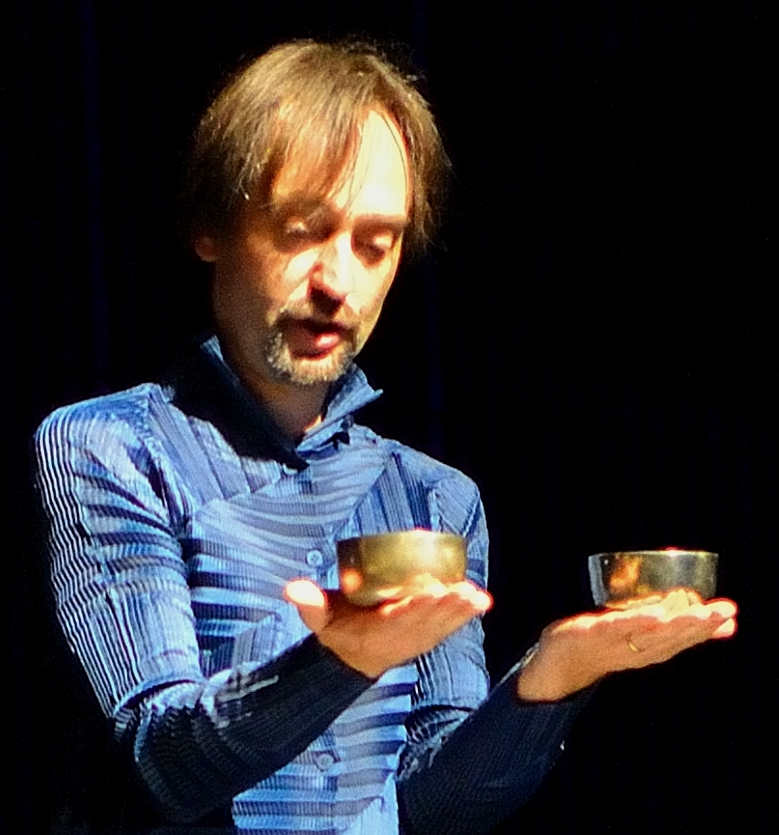
- Christian Dierstein
- Born: 1965 (age 60–61); Stuttgart, West Germany
- Occupations: Percussionist; Academic teacher
- Organizations: ensemble recherche; Trio Accanto; Hochschule für Musik in Basel; Darmstädter Ferienkurse

Christian Dierstein (born 1965) is a German percussionist and academic teacher. He has performed internationally as a soloist and as a regular chamber music player with ensemble recherche and Trio Accanto, performing several world premieres. He has been a professor from 2001, with a focus on music beyond Europe and improvisation.

== Life ==
Born in Stuttgart, Dierstein studied music with Bernhard Wulff in Freiburg im Breisgau, with Gaston Sylvestre in Paris, and with Wassilios Papadopulus in Mannheim. He received scholarships from the Studienstiftung and the Akademie Schloss Solitude in Stuttgart.

Dierstein has been the percussionist of the ensemble recherche since 1988. In 1994, he co-founded the Trio Accanto with pianist Yukiko Sugawara and saxophonist Marcus Weiss. who commissioned several new compositions. In 2012, the pianist was succeeded by Nicolas Hodges.

Dierstein has given solo concerts, among others, in the series "Rising Stars", in which he performed with the Kölner Philharmonie, the Wiener Konzerthaus, and the Royal Concertgebouw. In 2001, he performed as a soloist at the Beethovenfest in Bonn. He also performed at the Wiener Festwochen, the Munich Biennale, the Donaueschinger Musiktage, and the Biennale di Venezia. He played Stockhausen's Refrain in the Studio Neue Musik of the broadcaster Westdeutscher Rundfunk.

Dierstein participated in several world premieres of compositions by Manos Tsangaris, including in 1998 of Drei Orte with the Trio Accanto at the MusikBiennale Berlin, and in 2000 Initium in Rümlingen. In 2007, he played the world premiere of Beat Boxer, a composition for solo percussion and narrator by Manfred Stahnke. At the 2007 Donaueschinger Musiktage, Dierstein and the ensemble recherche played several world premieres, recorded by the SWR.

Dierstein wrote compositions for radio plays and theatre productions. As a soloist and chamber musician, Dierstein participated in radio and CD recordings. He has recorded works by Wolfgang Rihm and Dieter Schnebel, among others. He also interpreted works by Claude Vivier. He recorded Helmut Lachenmann's Air and Interieur I with conductor Lothar Zagrosek.

He has been professor for percussion and new chamber music at the Hochschule für Musik in Basel from 2001. A main focus is the examination of non-European music and free improvisation. Dierstein initiated the research project on percussion mallets and experimental exciting techniques, which was being carried out together with the composer and music researcher Michel Roth and the Bärenreiter publishing house. Dierstein has been lecturer at the Darmstädter Ferienkurse from 2008. He has lectured internationally, in Europe, the Americas and Asia.
