= Martin Smolka =

Czech composer

Martin Smolka (born 11 August 1959 in Prague) is a contemporary Czech composer of classical music.

== Works ==
1983

- Slzy (Tears)

1985-1988
Hudba hudbička (Music Sweet Music) for ensemble.

1988

- Music for Retuned Instruments

1989

- Zvonění (Ringing) for solo percussion.
- Nocturne

1990

- L’Orch pour l’orch;

1990-1992

- Netopýr (The Flying Dog);

1992

- Rain, a Window, Roofs, Chimneys, Pigeons and so... and Railway-Bridges, too

1993

- Trzy motywy pastoralne (Three pastoral motifs).

1993-1995

- Rent a Ricercar

1996

- Euforium;
- Three pieces for retuned orchestra.

1996-1997

- : Lullaby

1998

- 8 pieces for guitar quartet.
- Autumn Thoughts for ensemble.

1999

- Lieder ohne Worte und Passacaglia.
- Nešť for orchestra.
- Like Those Nicéan Barks of Yore for trombone and life electronics.

2000

- Blue Note
- Walden, the Distiller of Celestial Dews
- Remix, Redream, Reflight;
- Houby a nebe (Mushrooms and Heaven), Czech text Petr Pavel Fiala and Martin Smolka.

2001

- Geigenlieder, German text Christian Morgenstern and Bertolt Brecht;

2001-2003

- Nagano - Opera, libretto Jaroslav Dušek and Martin Smolka.
- Observing the Clouds

2002

- Missa
- Ach, mé milé c moll (Oh, my admired C minor).

2003

- Solitudo;

2003-2004

- Tesknice (Nostalgia)

2004

- Hats in the Sky
- For a Buck

2005

- Das schlaue Gretchen opera for children, libretto Klaus Angermann;

2006

- Lamento metodico;
- Słone i smutne (Salt and Sad), Polish text Tadeusz Różewicz;
- Semplice

2010

- fff (Fortissimo feroce Fittipaldi) for saxophone, piano and percussion - written for Trio Accanto.

== Discography ==
- Hudba hudbička, ensemble AGON, Arta Records, Prague 1991
- Music for Retuned Instruments, ensemble recherche, Wittener Tage für neue Kammermusik 1991, WDR Köln 1991
- Rain, a Window, Roofs, Chimneys, Pigeons and so... and Railway-Bridges, too, col legno München/SWF Baden-Baden, Donaueschinger Musiktage 1992
- A v sadech korálů, jež slabě zrůžověly, Petr Matuszek - bariton, Martin Smolka - piano, Na prahu světla, Happy Music, Prague 1996
- Rent a Ricercar, Flying Dog, For Woody Allen, Nocturne, AGON Orchestra, audio ego/Society for New Music Prague, 1997
- Euphorium, Rain, a Window, Roofs, Chimneys, Pigeons and so... and Railway-Bridges, too, Music for Retuned Instruments, Ringing, AGON Orchestra, audio ego/Society for New Music Prague, 1998
- Walden, the Distiller of Celestial Dews, SWR Vokalensemble Stuttgart, Meinhard Jenne – percussion, Rupert Huber - conductor, Donaueschinger Musiktage 2000
- fff (Fortissimo feroce Fittipaldi), Trio Accanto, Wergo (forthcoming)
