= Achilleas =

Achilleas (Greek: Αχιλλέας) is a male given name in Greece and Cyprus based on Achilles. It may refer to:

== People ==
- Achilleas Constantinou
- Achilleas Kallakis
- Achilleas Sarakatsanos
- Achilleas Aperghis
- Achilleas Papadimitriou
- Achilleas Salamouras
- Achilleas Aslanidis
- Achilleas Poungouras
- Achilleas Grammatikopoulos

== Other uses ==
- Achilleas Kaimakli, Cypriot basketball club
