= Hans Thomalla =

German-American composer (born 1975)

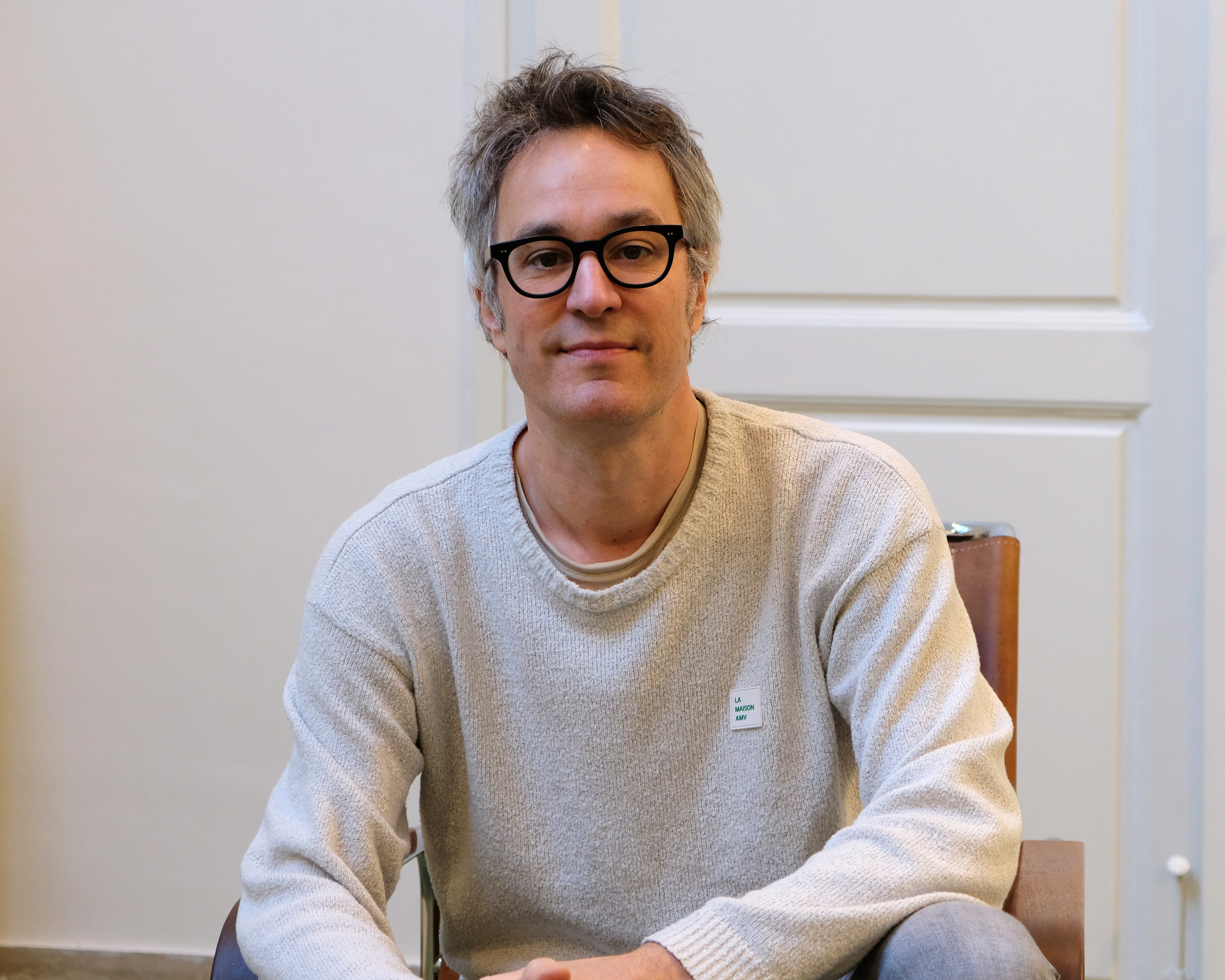
Hans Thomalla (2024)

Hans Thomalla (born 1975) is a German-American composer, who has resided in the United States since 2002.

== Career ==
Hans Thomalla was born in Bonn, and studied composition at the Frankfurt University of Music and Performing Arts, Germany, from 1994 to 1999. From 1999 until 2002 he was assistant dramaturg at the Staatsoper Stuttgart (production dramaturg for Helmut Lachenmann Das Mädchen mit den Schwefelhölzern et al.). This was followed by graduate studies at Stanford University (California) with Brian Ferneyhough from 2002 until 2007. Since 2007 he is Associate Professor of Composition at Northwestern University in Chicago, where he also directs the Institute for New Music.

Thomalla's compositions are featured at international festivals and institutions including Donaueschingen Festival, Huddersfield Contemporary Music Festival, Eclat-Festival Stuttgart, Wittener Tage für neue Kammermusik, Festival d'Automne at Paris, Darmstadt International Summer Courses for New Music. Ensembles performing his works include ensemble recherche, Trio Accanto, Ensemble Ascolta, Ensemble musikFabrik, Arditti Quartet, Spektral Quartet, Ensemble Modern and the Munich Philharmonic. His opera Fremd was premiered at the main stage of the Stuttgart Opera in July 2011.

== Awards ==
- 2004: Kranichsteiner Musikpreis
- 2006: Christoph Delz Preis
- 2006–2007: Fellow at the Stanford Humanities Center
- 2009: CIRA Grant (Collaborative Initiatives for Research in the Arts) at Northwestern University
- 2011: Ernst von Siemens Composer Prize
- 2013: Faculty Research Grant at Northwestern University
- 2014–2015: Fellow at the Wissenschaftskolleg zu Berlin
- 2017: Guggenheim Fellowship

== Selected works ==
=== Solo instrument ===
- Cello Counterpart for violoncello solo (2006)
- Piano Counterpart for piano (2008)
- Percussion Counterpart. Rhapsody for four reverberating sound-objects (2009)
- Ballade.Rauschen for piano (2014)

=== Chamber music ===
- wild.thing for amplified piano and two percussionist (2002–2003)
- Momentsmusicaux for five instruments (2003–2004)
- noema for two prepared pianos (2004)
- Stücke Charakter for six instruments (2005)
- Lied for tenor saxophone, vibraphone and piano (2007–2008)
- Albumblatt for string quartet (2010)
- Albumblatt II for saxophone quartet (2011)
- Wonderblock for ensemble (trumpet, trombone, electric guitar, piano, 2 percussionists, violoncello) (2012–2013)
- Fracking for saxophone and string trio (2013)
- Bagatellen for string quartet (2015)

=== Ensemble / orchestra ===
- Ausruff for chamber orchestra or large ensemble (2007)
- The Brightest Form of Absence. Multimedia Composition (Video: William Lamson) for soprano, ensemble, live-electronics, and video (2011)
- Flüchtig. Intermezzo for string orchestra (and guitar and percussion) (2011)
- Ballade for piano and orchestra (2016)

=== Vocal music ===
- I come near you for choir and ensemble (2016)

=== Opera ===
- Fremd. Opera in three scenes, one intermezzo, and one epilogue for soprano, choir, orchestra, and live-electronics (2005–2011)
- Kaspar Hauser. Opera in three acts for countertenor (Kaspar Hauser), 8 singers, orchestra, and sound director (2013–2015)

== Discography ==
- Fremd. Opera in three scenes, one intermezzo, and one epilogue by Hans Thomalla, Recording: Staatsoper Stuttgart. col legno 2012 (WWE 2SACD 40403)
- Hans Thomalla: Momentmusiceaux / wild.thing / Cello Counterpart / Stücke Charakter, WERGO 2008 (WER 6571 2)
- The Brightest Form of Absence. Multimedia Composition for soprano, ensemble, live-electronics, and video, Donaueschinger Musiktage 2011, NEOS 2012 (NEOS 11214-16)
- Ausruff for chamber orchestra, Donaueschinger Musiktage 2007, Vol. 2, NEOS 2008 (NEOS 10825)
- Lied, "Songs and Poems", Trio Accanto, WERGO (forthcoming)

== Bibliography ==
- Kunkel, Michael. 2009. "Ist 'Widerstand' heute eine musikalische Kategorie? Einige Standpunkte", Dissonanz 105, pp.4–11
- Thomalla, Hans. 2006. "Aspekte Analytischen Komponierens", Komponieren in der Gegenwart. Texte der 42. Internationalen Ferienkurse für Neue Musik 2004, edited by Jörn Peter Hiekel, Saarbrücken: Pfau, ISBN 3-89727-337-3, pp.96–112
- Thomalla, Hans. 2008. "Counterparts", Facets of the Second Modernity, edited by Claus-Steffen Mahnkopf, Frank Cox, Wolfram Schurig, Hofheim: Wolke, ISBN 978-3-936000-17-7, pp.229–241
- Thomalla, Hans. 2010. "'An den Rand des Augenblicks.' Komponieren als Schaffung von Gegenwart", Vorzeitbelebung. Vergangenheits- und Gegenwarts-Reflexionen in der Musik heute, edited by Jörn Peter Hiekel, Hofheim: Wolke, ISBN 978-3-936000-85-6, pp.71–82
- Thomalla, Hans. 2011. "Bedeutungsspuren – Widersprüche im zeitgenössischen Musiktheater", Die Kunst der Dramaturgie. Ein Handbuch, edited by Anke Roeder and Klaus Zehelein, Leipzig: Henschel, ISBN 978-3-89487-655-5, pp.58–70
