= Wittener Tage für neue Kammermusik =

- Genre: Festival of contemporary chamber music
- Begins: Weekend, end of April
- Frequency: Annual
- Locations: Witten, Germany
- Inaugurated: 1936
- Patrons: Witten; Westdeutscher Rundfunk
- Website: www.wittenertage.de

The Wittener Tage für neue Kammermusik (Witten Days for New Chamber Music) is a music festival for contemporary chamber music, jointly organised by the town Witten in the Ruhr Area and the broadcasting station Westdeutscher Rundfunk (WDR). The concerts take place over a weekend at the end of April or in early May, and concentrate on world premieres of small-scale works, more than 600 as of 2010. They are broadcast worldwide via the European Broadcasting Union.

== History ==
The composer Robert Ruthenfranz founded the Wittener Musiktage in 1936. After World War II the festival was held at irregular intervals (1947, 1948, 1950, 1953 and 1957), until 1960 when it became an annual event.

In 1969 the WDR took over the running of the festival, and it received its present name. From 1969 to 1989 Wilfried Brennecke of the WDR was responsible for the programming, focussing on composers portrait concert since 1978 and introducing composers from countries behind the Iron Curtain, such as Friedrich Goldmann and György Kurtág.

Since 1990 Harry Vogt, also of the WDR, has directed the program and widened the festival to all varieties of chamber music, including sound installations, improvisations and aspects of music theatre. Among others, the ensemble recherche from Freiburg, Klangforum Wien, the Arditti String Quartet and the Ensemble Modern have been regular performers. More recently, the Ascolta and musikFabrik ensembles have also taken part. Starting in 1999, ensemble recherche began commissioning an ongoing series of short In Nomine compositions for the festival, dedicated to Harry Vogt, collectively titled the Witten In Nomine Broken Consort Book. Composers who have contributed pieces to this series have included Brian Ferneyhough, Georg Friedrich Haas, Toshio Hosokawa, György Kurtág, Claus-Steffen Mahnkopf, Gérard Pesson, Robert H.P. Platz, Rolf Riehm, Wolfgang Rihm, Salvatore Sciarrino, Matthias Pintscher, Hans Zender, and Walter Zimmermann.

The festival of 2010 was an event of the European Capital of Culture in the Ruhrgebiet, called RUHR.2010. Featured composers were Matthias Pintscher and Jörg Widmann, both students of Hans Werner Henze. Other composers included Beat Furrer who founded the ensemble Klangforum Wien 25 years before, Enno Poppe (1969), Salvatore Sciarrino, Bernhard Lang and Friedrich Cerha.

The festival has been compared to the Donaueschinger Musiktage. The Goethe-Institut states its importance:

Westdeutscher Rundfunk (WDR) ... has staunchly supported contemporary music ..., playing a leading role from 1968 on at the Wittener Tage für neue Kammermusik, probably the most important contemporary music festival after Donaueschingen. With its focus on small formations, Witten thrives on its high standards of composition and interpretation. This festival has pioneered major developments in the history of musical genres, including the renaissance of the string quartet, that would not have been conceivable without its advocacy.
