= Cologne school (music) =

Composition school

In music, the Cologne School is a loosely associated group of composers and performers of the generation that came to prominence in the 1970s, who lived and worked in the city of Cologne, Germany.

== Composers ==
Most of the Cologne School composers had studied in Cologne during the 1960s with Vinko Globokar, Mauricio Kagel, Karlheinz Stockhausen, or Bernd Alois Zimmermann, at either the Kölner Hochschule für Musik und Tanz, the Rheinische Musikhochschule, or at the Kölner Kurse für Neue Musik, organised by Prof. Hugo Wolfram Schmidt at the Rheinische Musikhochschule between 1963 and 1968.

There is some disagreement about how to define the school and who its central figures are. One of the earliest writers on the Cologne School observed that a large proportion are foreigners, and chose to focus on seven non-German composers as representative: Ladislav Kupkovič from Slovakia, Péter Eötvös from Hungary, Bojidar Dimov from Bulgaria, Daniel Chorzempa and John McGuire, both from the United States, Mesías Maiguashca from Ecuador, and Clarence Barlow from India.

Seventeen years later, another writer identifies Barlow and three other composers, Gerald Barry (Ireland), Kevin Volans (South Africa), and Walter Zimmermann (Germany) as the central figures in the first wave of the group, and sees Stockhausen, Kagel, the Hochschule, and the Westdeutscher Rundfunk (through its electronic music studio, new-music concert series, commissioning of new music, and its commitment to innovative programme-making both in TV and radio) as the key agents that produced this group. According to this view, later important arrivals included Chris Newman, Claude Vivier, and John McGuire, but their approaches were in many ways at odds with the aesthetic of the earlier group.

== Performers ==
One performer particularly associated with the Cologne School is the pianist Herbert Henck

== Organisations ==
Several institutions founded in Cologne in the late 1960s and 1970s are associated with the Cologne-School composers. These include the Gruppe 8 (Georg Kröll, Heinz Martin Lonquich, York Höller, Manfred Niehaus, Hans Ulrich Humpert, Rolf Riehm, Peter Michael Braun, and Bojidar Dimov), founded in early 1969 and disbanded in August 1972, Feedback Studio (Johannes Fritsch, David C. Johnson, and Rolf Gehlhaar), founded in 1970, the Beginner-Studio (Walter Zimmermann), founded 1977, and the Oeldorf Group (Péter Eötvös, Mesías Maiguashca, and Joachim Krist, together with the cellist Gaby Schumacher), founded 1972 and active until 1979.

== Related ideas ==
A related term, Cologne School of Electronic Music, is sometimes applied to the previous generation of composers who worked mainly in the electronic music studio of the Westdeutscher Rundfunk in the 1950s and 1960s, including Karlheinz Stockhausen.

== Sources ==
- Anderson, Christine. 2013. Komponieren zwischen Reihe, Aleatorik und Improvisation: Franco Evangelistis Suche nach einer neuen Klangwelt. Sinefonia 18. Hofheim: Wolke Verlag. ISBN 9783936000788 (pbk).
- Butzmann, Frieder. 2003. Verfügbare Musik: Konsequenzen der Entwicklung von Tonaufnahme- und Wiedergabeverfahren. Positionen: Beiträge zur Neuen Musik, no. 56 (August): 7–12.
- Custodis, Michael. 2004. Die soziale Isolation der neuen Musik: Zum Kölner Musikleben nach 1945. Stuttgart: Franz Steiner Verlag. ISBN 978-3-515-08375-1.
- Enders, Bernd. 2011. "Der wohltemperierte Musikcomputer". In Zahlen, Zeichen und Figuren: Mathematische Inspirationen in Kunst und Literatur, edited by Andrea Albrecht, Gesa von Essen, Werner Frick, 47–82. Linguae & litterae 11. Berlin and Boston: Walter de Gruyter. ISBN 978-3-11-022905-9 (cloth); ISBN 3110229056 (e-book).
- Fox, Christopher. 2007. "Where the River Bends: The Cologne School in Retrospect". The Musical Times 148, no. 1901 (Winter): 27–42.
- Kapko-Foretić, Zdenka. 1980. "Kölnska škola avangarde". Zvuk: Jugoslavenska muzička revija, 1980 no. 2:50–55.
- Reese, Kirsten. 2008. "Geschlechtslose elektronische Musik? PerformerInnen am Laptop". In Performativität und Performance, edited by Martina Oster, Waltraud Ernst, and Marion Gerards, 99–109. Focus Gender 8. Münster: LIT Verlag. ISBN 978-3-8258-0660-6.
- Schabbing, Bernd. 2008. "Technik und Kunst: Wechselwirkungen und Bezügen”. In Technik zwischen "artes" und "arts", edited by Reinhold Bauer, James C. Williams, and Wolfhard Weber, 175–184. Münster, New York, Munich, and Berlin: Waxmann Verlag. ISBN 978-3-8309-2026-7.
- Stockhausen, Karlheinz. 1971. "Kölner Kurse für Neue Musik", in his Texte zur Musik 3, edited by Dieter Schnebel, 196–211. DuMont Dokumente. Cologne: DuMont Buchverlag.
