= Ensemble recherche =

German contemporary classical music ensemble

Ensemble Recherche
- Origin: Germany
- Years active: 1985–present
- Members: Adam Woodward (violin); Sofia von Atzingen (viola); Åsa Åkerberg (cello); Anja Clift (flute); Eduardo Olloqui (oboe); Shizuyo Oka (clarinet); Christian Dierstein (percussion); Klaus Steffes-Holländer (piano)
- Past members: Melise Mellinger (violin); Mario Caroli (flute); Barbara Maurer (viola); Jean-Pierre Collot (piano)
- Website: ensemble-recherche.de

Ensemble Recherche is a German contemporary classical music ensemble with nine fixed members. Founded in Freiburg im Breisgau in 1985, the ensemble has premiered more than 1,000 works, dozens of which have since come to be recognised as masterworks of contemporary repertoire.

== History ==
The ensemble was founded in 1985 and is based in Freiburg. The repertoire is focused on the music of the 20th and 21st century while covering the spectrum from classical modernism and the Darmstadt School to contemporary music, but occasionally also including works composed before 1700, interpreted from a contemporary perspective. The ensemble has commissioned and premiered works by composers such as Hèctor Parra, Brice Pauset, Gérard Pesson, Helmut Lachenmann, and Wolfgang Rihm.

The ensemble plays concerts, especially a concert series in Freiburg. In addition, they participate in film, radio and theater projects, provide courses for instrumentalists and composers in Freiburg and at the Darmstädter Ferienkurse, and hold open rehearsals. Together with the Freiburger Barockorchester, Ensemble Recherche organises the annual Ensemble-Akademie Freiburg for ensemble playing.

Current members of the ensemble are Anja Clift (flute), Eduardo Olloqui (oboe), Shizuyo Oka (clarinet), Klaus Steffes-Holländer (piano), Christian Dierstein (percussion), Adam Woodward (violin), Sofia von Atzingen (viola) and Åsa Åkerberg (cello). The Artistic Director is Australian composer Paul Clift.

Starting in 1999, the ensemble began commissioning an ongoing series of short In Nomine compositions for the festival Wittener Tage für neue Kammermusik, titled the Witten In Nomine Broken Consort Book. Composers including Brian Ferneyhough, Georg Friedrich Haas, Toshio Hosokawa, György Kurtág, Claus-Steffen Mahnkopf, Gérard Pesson, Robert H.P. Platz, Rolf Riehm, Wolfgang Rihm, Salvatore Sciarrino, Hans Zender, and Walter Zimmermann have submitted works to the collection.

On 22 August 2008, the eightieth birthday of Karlheinz Stockhausen, members of the ensemble played the premiere of Balance, the Seventh Hour of his cycle Klang, for flute, cor anglais, and bass clarinet, in the great hall of the WDR.

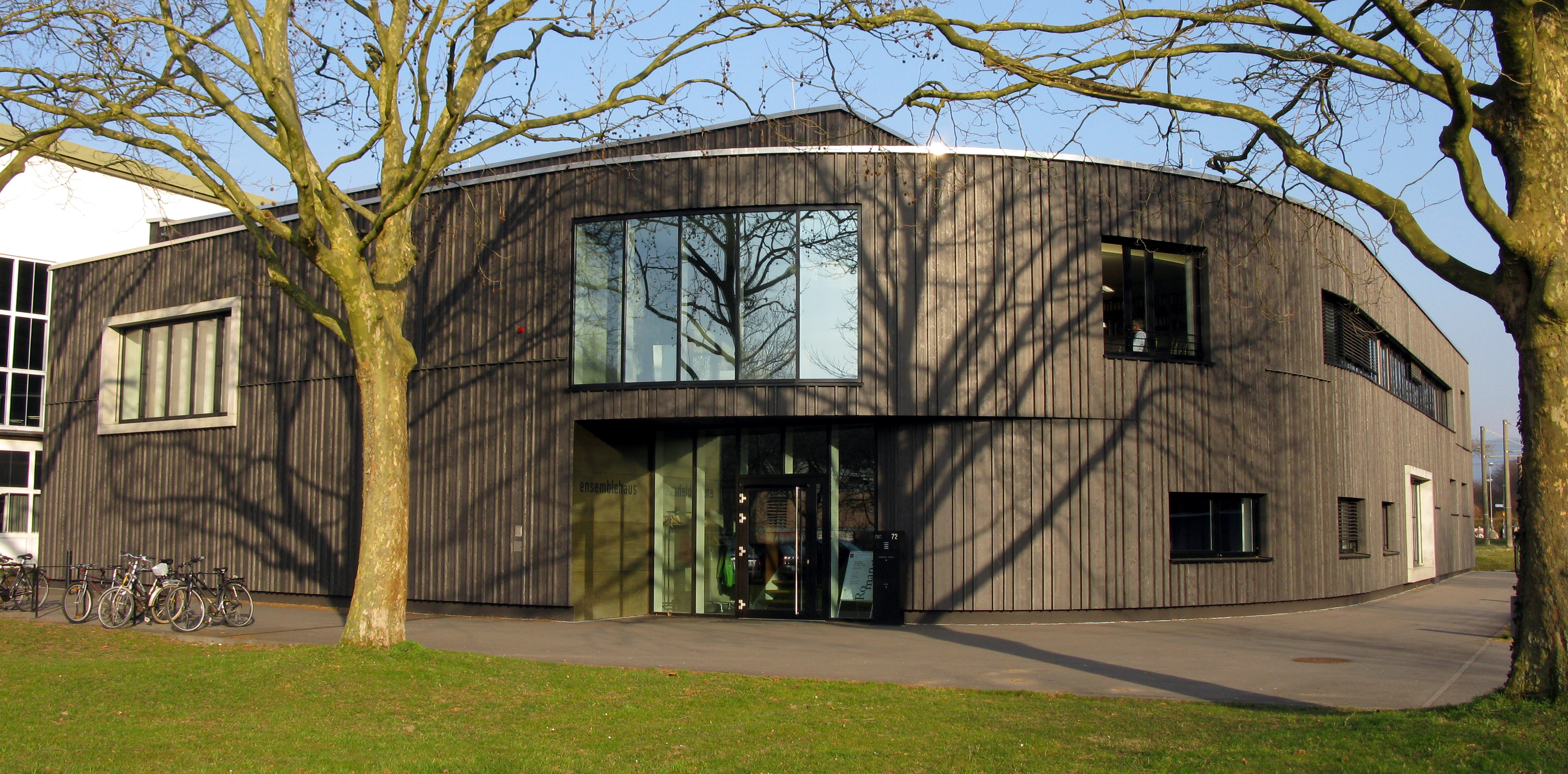
Ensemblehaus Freiburg

Since 2012, Ensemble Recherche has been housed at Ensemblehaus Freiburg.

== Recordings ==
The ensemble has recorded more than 50 CDs, examples of which include Luigi Nono's Guai ai gelidi mostri (1995), György Kurtág's Omaggio and Hans Abrahamsen's Winter and Schnee (2009).

Their 2-CD recording of 22 In Nomine pieces (2005) was described as follows: "... it provides a common reference point for an unusually large collection of German modernist music, and the production by the West German Radio of Cologne is top-notch."

Several recordings were made in collaboration with the broadcaster SWR and its Experimentalstudio, founded in 1971.

== Awards ==
In 1997, Ensemble Recherche became the fourth recipient of the Rheingau Musik Preis, "... in recognition of their services to disseminating contemporary chamber music works, but also to modern classical works and discoveries from the 1920s and 1930s." Their collaboration with composers, vital for the development of chamber and ensemble music was highlighted as well as their sensitive and dramatic approach to the music.
