= Morison/opit =

morison/opit was the authorial name given to the collaboration between composers Benjamin Morison and Simon Opit.

== Project ==
Benjamin Morison and Simon Opit were composers who worked exclusively in collaboration for a period of some years, approximately 1991–1994. As one commentator wrote, "Much of their work consists of two set of parts written independently, which adds a new radical sense of indeterminacy one might have thought lost in recent works of the experimentalist genre."

In a text published in 1992, they wrote:

The score of double arrangement has two names on it, implying that two composers were involved. [...] Suppose it were the true that one composer was responsible for the composition of the music of one duo, the other for that of the other duo: in what sense has one piece of music been composed? Why is it not the case that two composers have simply superimposed two different pieces, given them one title and call this process a collaboration? The obvious answer is that the composers collaborated on the actual composition of the music - the music of one could always affect the music of the other. Thus it is not the mere existence of a score that ensures the work's singularity (or the singularity of our future works) [...]

This process of composition makes it impossible for this music to be self-expressive or expressive at all in the sense that a message is in no way intentionally passed from composer to audience. The absence of intention behind each actual result (while we have ensured the material's ability to cope with the stress of any of the infinite possible results) itself blocks any route being traced back to the composers so that there simply does not exist anything which can plausibly be said to be expressed. Thus if the results of the collaboration are termed 'music' then the composers have demonstrated the falsity of the view which says that composers communicate with their music. That leaves the materials standing alone.

== Critical reception ==
The BBC broadcast several works by morison/opit.

Two concerts featuring their music were reviewed in Tempo magazine.

== List of works ==
Based on the list of works published in Farben '92, expanded from various other sources.

- long and soft bowing (1991), for bowed vibraphone and string quartet
- sew the blue sail (1991)
- double arrangement (1992), for piano & 'cello and violin & vibraphone
- II - flute, piano, violin, viola, 'cello (1992): broadcast Fri 21st Jul 1995, 22:25 on BBC Radio 3
- III - large ensemble (1992)
- one piano (1992): written for Nicolas Hodges and broadcast by him Sun 19th Feb 1995, 20:45 on BBC Radio 3
- touching the piano (1992), one trombone (1992)
- violin, viola, cello (1993)
- violins and viola (1993)
- IV - Mixed ensemble (1993), for 2 violins and viola, and trombone and cello
- one viola (1993)
- sound river (1993)
- I992 (1993) for organ
- V - voices, cello (1994)
- VI - violins and ensemble (1993-4)
- VII - piano quartet (1994)
- VIII - piano and string quartet (1988/1994): broadcast Fri 21st Jul 1995, 22:25 on BBC Radio 3
- X - string quartet (1994): commissioned by BBC Radio 3

== Bibliography ==
- morison/opit, List of works, Farben '92, London: Orchid Music, 1992, edited by Edward Dudley Hughes, p. 17
- morison/opit, double arrangement (text), Farben '92, London: Orchid Music, 1992, edited by Edward Dudley Hughes, p. 13-16
- morison/opit, double arrangement (score of composition), Farben '92, London: Orchid Music, 1992, edited by Edward Dudley Hughes, p. 18-32
- Laurence Hughes, Ixion, Purcell Room, 21 February 1993, Tempo, New Series, No. 185 (Jun., 1993), p. 33
- Ian Pace, Etcetera Ensemble, Tempo, New Series, No. 188 (Mar., 1994), p. 58
