= Daniel Chorzempa =

American organist (1944–2023)

- Born: December 7, 1944; Minneapolis, Minnesota, U.S.
- Died: March 25, 2023 (aged 78)
- Genres: Classical music
- Occupations: Musician, architect, composer
- Instruments: Piano, organ
- Website: http://www.chorzempa.com

Daniel Walter Chorzempa (December 7, 1944 – March 25, 2023) was an American organist, composer and architect.

== Biography ==
Daniel Chorzempa was born in Minneapolis, Minnesota on December 7, 1944. He subsequently studied music and architecture at the University of Minnesota and further music studies in Cologne. After starting out as a pianist (achieving some success in Europe during the late 1960s and early 1970s), he became better known as an organist. In the 1970s he was also active as a composer associated with the Cologne School and New Simplicity.

Chorzempa never married. He died on March 25, 2023, at the age of 78.
