= Sarah Nemtsov =

German composer (born 1980)

Sarah Nemtsov (née Reuter, born 28 May 1980) is a German composer. Nemtsov was born in Oldenburg and now lives in Berlin. She started her music lessons and composing aged eight. She started playing the Oboe aged 14. Her compositions are recognizable through their confrontation with literature and other art forms. Her catalogue includes more than 150 compositions in almost all genres, from solo to orchestra, including large stage works and multimedia.

She became a full-time composer in 2007. Several of her works are published by Peermusic Classical GmbH. Since 2016, her works have been published by Ricordi. She is married to the pianist and musicologist Jascha Nemtsov. Her mother was the painter Elisabeth Naomi Reuter. Since 2022, she has been professor of composition at the University Mozarteum Salzburg, Austria. Since winter semester 2022, Nemstov has been teaching as a professor of composition at the Mozarteum university in Salzburg. She is also a member of the Academy of Arts Berlin (Music Section).

== Education ==
She studied composition under Nigel Osborne and Johannes Schöllhorn, and oboe under Klaus Becker at the Hochschule für Musik und Theater Hannover. At the Universität der Künste Berlin, she continued her oboe studies under Burkhard Glaetzner, and her composition at post-graduate level with Walter Zimmermann, where she graduated with distinction.

== Awards and scholarships ==
Nemtsov has won several awards as a composer, including the national competition for young composers, "Schüler komponieren", fives times between 1995 and 1999, as well as the international Delmenhorst competition for composers in 1995. In 2007, Nemtsov won the Hanns-Eisler-Preis for Composition. In 2012, she was awarded the “Deutscher Musikautorenpreis” for the support of upcoming composers. In 2013 she received the Busoni Composition Prize, in 2018 she was awarded the Oldenburger Kompositionspreis, in 2025 the Heidelberger Künstlerinnenpreis.

Since 2021, she is a member of the Akademie der Künste (The Academy of Arts) Berlin as well as the Saxon Academy of the Arts.

In addition, she has received several scholarships, including one from the German Academic Foundation in 2003, and one from the Aribert Reimann Foundation in 2007. In 2009 she received a scholarship from the Wilfried Steinbrenner Foundation, and in 2011, she was a fellow at Villa Serpentara (Italy). She has also received grants from the Berlin Senate and the Stiftung Zurückgeben.

== Notable performances ==
Her music has been performed at many international festivals including Donaueschinger Musiktage, Bregenz Festival, Münchener Biennale, Holland Festival, Wien Modern and Festival Musica. She collaborates with renowned ensembles and orchestras (such as the WDR Orchestra, the Deutsche Sinfonieorchester, Radiosinfonieorchester Vienna, Ensemble Musikfabrik, Klangforum Wien, Ensemble Intercontemporain, Arditti quartet, ensemble modern, ensemble mosaik, Ensemble Adapter, Nikel ensemble, Meitar, Decoder ensemble, Neue Vocalsolisten Stuttgart, ensemble recherche, Basel Sinfonietta, Finnish Baroque orchestra etc.).

== Selected works ==
=== Operas ===
==== Herzland (2005) ====
Chamber opera in five acts, 30'. Libretto after the correspondence between Paul Celan and Gisèle Celan-Lestrange. Premiered in on 20 January 2006, Alte Zeche, Barsinghausen, (original version);
24 Nov 2009, Hubert-Burda-Saal, Munich (revised version)

==== L'Absence (2006–2008) ====
Full-length opera in five acts with prologue and epilogue. Libretto by the composer, after Livre des Questions by Edmond Jabès. Premiere on 3 May 2012 by Munich Biennale.

==== Sacrifice (2016) ====
Opera in four acts. Premiered on 5 March 2017 by Halle Opera House. Libretto by Dirk Laucke (excerpts from "Trenches of Joy").

verflucht (2019)

monologue for soprano and ensemble – text by Gerhild Steinbuch – Premiere September 2019, Taschenopernfestival Salzburg – with Tehila Nini Goldstein (soprano)

OPHELIA (2020–2022)

Opera in 12 images for 12 solo voices, choir, orchestra and electronics – libretto (after Shakespeare) by Mirko Bonné – Premiere: 13 May 2023, Saarländisches Staatstheater

WE (2022–2024)

Opera in 5 acts for 9 voices, choir, orchestra, instrumental soloists (synthesizer, e guitar), electronics and video – libretto after Evgenij Zamyatin's novel “We” – WP: 14. May 2026, Theater Dortmund

=== Orchestral works ===
==== TZIMTZUM (2020–2023) ====
tetralogy for 4 soloists and large orchestra written in 2015. Duration of 70 minutes. World premiere by Nikel Ensemble, WDR Orchestra, Peter Rundel.

==== black trees (2020) ====
Work for orchestra written in 2020. Duration ca. 20 minutes.

==== dropped.drowned (2017) ====
Work for large orchestra written in 2017. Duration of 17 minutes.

==== Scattered ways (2015) ====
Work for large orchestra. Duration of 13 minutes. World premiere by Philharmonisches Orchester Erfurt and Joana Mallwitz. Several performances since then, including Konzerthausorchester Berlin.

==== SHESH (2014) ====
for amplified string orchestra. Duration of 18 minutes. World premiere was by Orchester Jakobsplatz and Daniel Grossmann.

=== Other ===
==== Room I-III ====
"Layering for 8 musicians" written in 2013. Duration of 18 minutes.

Numerous works of chamber music, ensemble and solo compositions.
