= Achilleas Aperghis =

Achilleas Aperghis or Apergis (Greek: Αχιλλέας Απέργης, Corfu, 1909 – Athens, 1986) was a Greek sculptor.

== Biography ==
Aperghis was born in Garitsa, a suburb of the city of Corfu in 1909. He initially engaged in trade but he also attended drawing classes at the Corfu Evening School. In 1937 he settled in Athens and enrolled at the Athens School of Fine Arts (ASFA), where he studied until 1939 under the guidance of Thomas Thomopoulos, Kostas Dimitriadis and Michael Tombros. In 1952 he undertook his first trip to Europe, in Italy and Paris, and later on to England (1959). As an artist he participated in dozens of individual and group exhibitions in Greece, England and France. He also presented his works twice (1956, 1968) at the Venice Biennale. He died in Athens in 1986. He was married since 1945 to the painter Irini Apergi. Their son is the composer Georges Aperghis.

== Artistry ==
Aperghis began working with stone as his main material, but later on he switched exclusively to metal. Until 1946 he followed the "academic" tradition in his works, influenced by his professors at the Athens Academy of Fine Arts. He then moved to the newer trends of his time. A large part of his work was donated by his son in 2002 to the Macedonian Museum of Contemporary Art (currently known as MOMus–Museum of Contemporary Art). Other works of Aperghis can be found in the National Gallery of Greece, the Teloglion Foundation of Art, the Museum of Contemporary Art of Crete, and others.

== Bibliography ==
- Christou, Chrysanthos & koumvakali – Anastasiadi, Myrto (1982). Νεοελληνική Γλυπτική (1800–1940), Commercial Bank of Greece, Athens
- Lydakis, Stelios (1981). Οι Έλληνες Γλύπτες – Η νεοελληνική γλυπτική: ιστορία – τυπολογία – λεξικό γλυπτών, Volume 5, MELISSA, Athens
