= Donaueschingen Festival =

New music festival

Donaueschinger Festival
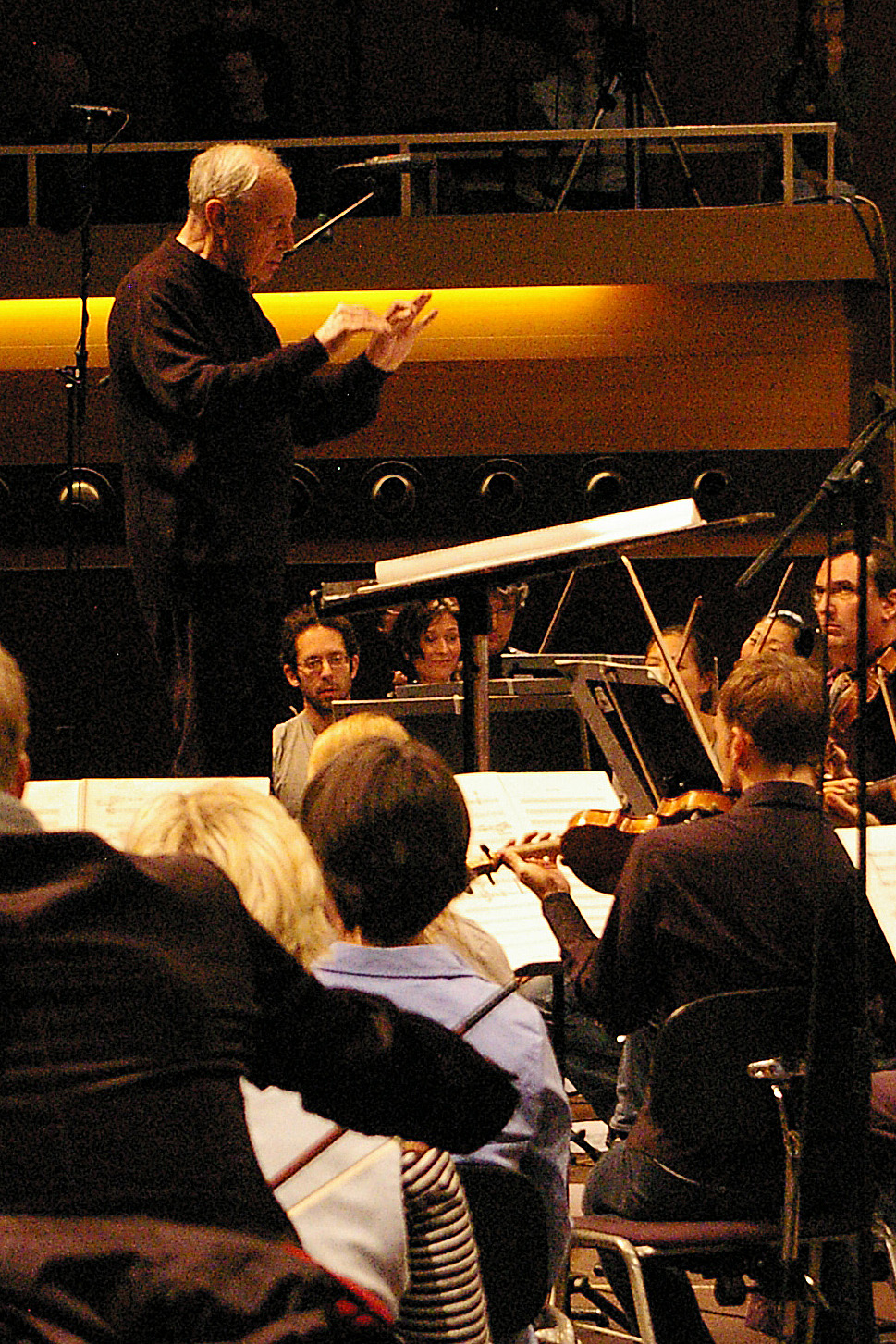
- Pierre Boulez at the Donaueschingen Festival in 2008
- Genre: Contemporary classical music
- Locations: Donaueschingen, Germany
- Years active: 1921–present
- Founders: Donaueschingen Society of Friends of Music
- Website: Donaueschingen Festival, Südwestrundfunk

The Donaueschingen Festival, or more precisely "Donaueschingen Music Days" (German: Donaueschinger Musiktage), is a three-day October event presenting new music in the town of the same name, where the Danube River starts, at the edge of the Black Forest in southern Germany. Founded in 1921, it is the oldest festival for contemporary music in the world.

== History ==
In 1913, the Donaueschingen Society of Friends of Music was founded under the auspices of the House of Fürstenberg. The idea soon arose to establish a small festival for presenting young and promising artists. A committee of distinguished musicians, among them Ferruccio Busoni, Joseph Haas, Hans Pfitzner, Arthur Nikisch and Richard Strauss, met in 1921 to discuss possible formats for the event.

The first concert was presented just a few months later. On 31 July 1921 the "Donaueschingen chamber music performances for the advancement of contemporary music" (Donaueschinger Kammermusikaufführungen zur Förderung zeitgenössischer Tonkunst) gave world premiere performances of music by Alois Hába, Ernst Krenek and Paul Hindemith. Three years later, guest composers included Arnold Schoenberg, Anton Webern, and Josef Matthias Hauer, who were among the main representatives of the Viennese twelve-tone technique. In 1925, the festival's scope expanded from presenting only chamber music to include choral works; one year later, the offerings included music for wind orchestra. With experimental forms of music and art such as Oskar Schlemmer's Triadic Ballet, the festival encompassed an increasingly wide range of activities and became more and more attractive to avant-garde composers and performers alike.

In 1927, the festival relocated to Baden-Baden. During the years 1931–1933, 1935, 1940–1945, and 1948–1949, all concerts were cancelled due to the overall national and international political situation. Instead of the original chamber music series, the National-Socialist party organized its own concerts from 1933 to 1935, called 'Donaueschingen Musical Celebration' or 'Old and new chamber-music from the Swabian-Alemannic region'.

After the war, the Society of Friends of Music was able to re-establish the festival under the name Donaueschingen Festival of Contemporary Music. A cooperative agreement between the Südwestfunk in Baden-Baden and its orchestra shifted the program emphasis to larger orchestral works. In 1951, Olivier Messiaen and his student Pierre Boulez offered new compositions, along with older works by Hindemith and Béla Bartók.

In 1972, the Karl Sczuka Prize for Hörspiel (radio play) was awarded for the first time during the festival. Since 1993, every festival has its own theme.

The 2020 Donaueschingen Festival was canceled on short notice due to the COVID-19 pandemic.

== List of selected composers ==
- 1921: Alban Berg, Alois Hába, Ernst Krenek, Philipp Jarnach, Anton Webern, Arnold Schoenberg, Josef Matthias Hauer, Paul Hindemith
- 1925: Hanns Eisler, Paul Dessau, Igor Stravinsky
- 1926: Paul Hindemith, Ernst Toch, Gerhart Münch
- 1927: Kurt Weill, Darius Milhaud, George Antheil
- 1951–1960: Pierre Boulez, Olivier Messiaen, Hans Werner Henze, Karlheinz Stockhausen, Bernd Alois Zimmermann, Luigi Nono, Earle Brown, John Cage, Henri Pousseur, Iannis Xenakis, Luciano Berio, Elliott Carter, Mauricio Kagel, Edgard Varèse, Krzysztof Penderecki, Wilhelm Killmayer, Marcel Mihalovici
- 1961–1980: György Ligeti, Heinz Holliger, Alfred Schnittke, Dieter Schnebel, Wolfgang Rihm, Helmut Lachenmann, Hans Zender, Brian Ferneyhough, Péter Eötvös, Younghi Pagh-Paan
- 1981–2000: Luc Ferrari, Helmut Lachenmann, Luigi Nono, Bruno Maderna, Harrison Birtwistle, Michaël Lévinas, Gerhard Rühm, Younghi Pagh-Paan, Zoltán Jeney, Hans Oesch, Hans Peter Haller, Christoph Staude, Klaus Huber, Cornelius Cardew, Michael Henning, James Tenney, Alvin Curran, Julio Estrada
- 2001–2010: Peter Ablinger, Salvatore Sciarrino, Mark Andre, Georg Friedrich Haas, Pascal Dusapin, Walter Zimmermann, Brian Ferneyhough, Peter Ruzicka, Chaya Czernowin, Enno Poppe, Pierluigi Billone
- Since 2011: Beat Furrer, Georges Aperghis, Francesco Filidei, Rebecca Saunders, Bernhard Lang, Marco Stroppa, Klaus Lang, Nima A Rowshan, Stefan Prins, Øyvind Torvund

== Sources ==
- Josef Häusler: Spiegel der Neuen Musik: Donaueschingen. Chronik – Tendenzen – Werkbesprechungen. Kassel (1996) – ISBN 3-7618-1232-9
- Bennwitz, Hanspeter: Donaueschingen und die Neue Musik 1921–1955. Donaueschingen (1955).

== See also ==
- List of electronic music festivals
