= Achilleas Constantinou =

British businessman

Achilleas Constantinou (born 1948) is a British businessman and the co-founder, with his late brother Aristos Constantinou, of the Ariella fashion label.

== Early life ==
Constantinou was born in 1948. He was educated at Arnos Secondary Modern School, Southgate, London, followed by Waltham Forest Technical College, and King's College London, from where he graduated with an LLB degree in Law.

== Career ==
He was the co-founder, with his brother Aristos Constantinou, of the Ariella fashion label. He took on the sole management of the business after his brother was murdered in the early hours of New Year's Day 1985 at his home in The Bishops Avenue, Hampstead, London.
