= Gerhart Münch =

German pianist and composer

Gerhart Münch, sometimes given as Gerhart Muench, (23 March 1907 Dresden – 9 December 1988 Tacámbaro, Michoacán Mexico) was a German pianist and composer.

Munch faced issues during the 1930s because he refused to join the Nazi party. He was drafted and served in the German military from 1940 to 1944. In 1947 he emigrated to the United States.
