= Aldo Clementi =

Italian composer (1925–2011)

Aldo Clementi in 1983

Aldo Clementi (25 May 1925 – 3 March 2011) was an Italian classical composer.

== Life ==
Aldo Clementi was born in Catania, Italy. He studied the piano, graduating in 1946 at the Conservatorio Santa Cecilia in Rome. His studies in composition began in 1941, and his teachers included Alfredo Sangiorgi and Goffredo Petrassi. After receiving his diploma in 1954 again at the Conservatorio Santa Cecilia, he attended the Darmstadt summer courses from 1955 to 1962. Important influences during this period included meeting Bruno Maderna in 1956, and working at the electronic music studio of the Italian radio broadcaster RAI in Milan.

Poesia de Rilke (1946) was the first work of his to be performed (Vienna, 1947). Of more significance was the premiere of Cantata (1954), which was broadcast by North German Radio (Hamburg) in 1956. In 1959, he won second prize in the ISCM competition with Episodi (1958), and in 1963, he took first prize in the same competition, with Sette scene da "Collage" (1961).

He taught music theory at the University of Bologna from 1971 to 1992.

Clementi died on 3 March 2011 in Rome.

== Style ==
In 1983 David Fanning described Clementi's style of decelerating canons as "sharing in the widespread post-serial depression of the 1970s", while in 1988 Paul Griffiths referred to the "Alexandrian simplicity of his solution to the current confusion in music. Clementi himself described his works as "an extremely dense counterpoint, relegating the parts to the shameful role of inaudible, cadaverous micro-organisms".

His music has been featured at Ultima, the Oslo Contemporary Music Festival (2009), performed and recorded by ensembles including Trio Accanto, the Quatuor Bozzini, the Ives Ensemble and the Contemporary Music Ensemble of Wales and broadcast by BBC Radio 3.

== Selected works ==
- Episodi (1958) for orchestra
- Ideogrammi n. 1 (1959) for 16 instruments
- Triplum (1960) for flute, oboe and clarinet
- Collage (1961) – stage work
- Informel 2 (1962) for 15 performers
- Collage 2 (1962) for electronics
- Informel 3 (1961–63) for orchestra
- Intavolatura (1963) for harpsichord
- Variante A (1964) for mixed chorus and orchestra
- Concerto (1970) for piano and 7 instruments
- Concerto (1975) for piano, 24 instruments and carillons
- Clessidra (1976) for chamber orchestra
- L'orologio di Arcevla (1979) for 13 performers
- Variazioni (1979) for viola solo
- Capriccio (1979–1980) for viola and 24 instruments
- Dodici variazioni (1980) for solo guitar
- Fantasia su Roberto Fabbriciani (1980–81) for flute and tape
- Es (1981) – stage work
- Parafrasi (1981) 18 voice canon realized with processor
- Adagio (1983) for quintet with prepared piano
- Ouverture (1984) for 12 flutes
- Concerto (1986) for piano and 14 instruments
- Fantasia (1987) for 4 guitars
- Tribute (1988) for string quartet
- Berceuse (1989) for orchestra
- Romanza (1991) for piano and orchestra
- The Plaint (1992) for female voice and 13 instruments
- Wiegenlied (1994) for soprano and 5 instruments
- Tre Ricercari (2000) for saxophone, piano and celesta/vibraphone/tubular bells
- Sonate Y. (2002) for solo violin
- Vertigo (2005) for 14 instruments
