= Hochschule für Musik (Basel) =

Swiss conservatoire in Basel

Coordinates: 47.5547°N 7.5863°E

The Hochschule für Musik is an institute of the City of Basel Music Academy in Basel, Switzerland. It owns the status of an advanced vocational university since 1999.

== History ==
Composer Hans Huber, director of the general music school Allgemeine Musikschule founded in 1867, founded in 1905 a conservatory, the first of its kind in the German-speaking part of Switzerland. Today this institution bears the name Hochschule für Musik in Basel. In 1954, the Allgemeine Musikschule and the Hochschule für Musik were combined with the Schola Cantorum Basiliensis, which was founded in 1933 by Paul Sacher.

== Alumni ==
- Andrea Lorenzo Scartazzini (born 1971)
