= Stefano Gervasoni =

Italian composer (born 1962)

Stefano Gervasoni (born 26 July 1962 in Bergamo) is an Italian composer.

A protégé of Luigi Nono, Gervasoni studied at the Giuseppe Verdi Conservatory in Milan. In 1995 he became composer in residence at the Villa Médicis in Rome. He has won many prizes for composition, and several of his works were commissioned by cultural institutions in France, where he spent three years.

He is currently professor of composition at the Conservatoire National Supérieur de Paris (Paris Conservatoire).
