= Thomas Kessler (composer) =

Swiss composer

Thomas Kessler (25 September 1937 – April 2024) was a Swiss composer. He was a pioneer of electronic music

== Life ==
Kessler was born on 25 September 1937 in Zürich. He studied literature at the Universities of Zurich and Paris, followed by composition studies with Heinz Friedrich Hartig, Ernst Pepping and Boris Blacher at the Hochschule für Musik Berlin.

In 1965 he founded his own electronic studio and became a member of the Gruppe Neue Musik Berlin. He encountered composers such as Luc Ferrari and Vinko Globokar. Later he was director of the Elektronik Beat Studio Berlin as well as director of music at the Centre Universitaire International de Formation et de Recherche Dramatiques in Nancy.

From 1973 to 2000 Thomas Kessler taught composition and music theory at the City of Basel Music Academy. After a new studio of the Elektronische Studio Basel was opened in December 1986, Kessler replaced David C. Johnson as head of the studio. His students include Wolfgang Heiniger, Max E. Keller, Bettina Skrzypczak, René Wohlhauser and Thomas Chr. Heyde.

Together with Gérard Zinsstag he founded the Tage für Neue Musik in Zürich and with Wolfgang Heiniger the Festival ECHT!ZEIT in Basel. Since 2001 he has been Composer in Residence at the New Music Concerts in Toronto. In 2018 he was awarded the Schweizer Musikpreis.

Kessler died in April 2024 aged 86.

== Bibliography ==
- Burde, Wolfgang: 'Kompositionsportrait Thomas Kessler', Melos/NZM, iv (1978), 22-6
- Koblyakov, Lev: 'Thomas Kesslers Control-Stücke', Dissonanz 24 (1990), 17-22
- Gartman, Thomas: 'Thomas Kessler', New Grove, 2nd Edition, Vol. 13, 503
- Weissberg, Daniel: Ein Rebell zweiter Unordnung. Laudatio zur Verleihung des Marguerite Staehelin Preises an Thomas Kessler, Zürich 2006
- Gottstein, Björn: 'Im Schleifen der Differenz. Thomas Kesslers Orchesterstück "Utopia"', Dissonanz 108 (2009), S. 28-31
- Nonnenmann, Rainer: Höhenflug mit gestutzten Flügeln. Zur Kölner Uraufführung von Thomas Kesslers "Utopia II" (1. Juli 2011), Dissonanz 115 (2011), 76-77
