= Jō Kondō =

Japanese composer

- Born: 28 October 1947; Japan Tokyo
- Other name: 近藤 譲
- Occupation: composer

Jō Kondō (近藤譲; surname Kondō; born 28 October 1947 in Tokyo) is a Japanese composer of contemporary classical music.

Kondo studied composition from 1968 to 1972 with Yoshio Hasegawa and Hiroaki Minami at the Tokyo National University of Fine Arts and Music. He won the third prize and made his debut in Japan-Germany Contemporary Music Festival in 1969. He serves as Professor of Music at Ochanomizu University in Tokyo and also teaches at Tokyo University of Arts and Elisabeth University of Music in Hiroshima.

His interests include hocket, the music of Ancient Greece, and strong differences in instrumental timbre, all of which are reflected in his compositions. The chamber version of his 1975 composition Sight Rhythmics reflects the latter in its unusual instrumentation of violin, banjo, steel drum, electric piano, and tuba, for example. His opera Hagoromo, based on a Noh play and premiered in Florence in 1994, is the unique case in which his music blends western techniques with oriental traditions. In 1978, he spent a year in New York City with a grant from the Rockefeller Foundation. While there, he became personally acquainted with a number of avant-garde American composers, including John Cage and especially Morton Feldman.

Kondo's music has been performed by the London Sinfonietta, the Philharmonia Orchestra, the NHK Symphony Orchestra, the Arditti Quartet, NEXUS, the Balanescu Quartet, Aki Takahashi and the Birmingham Contemporary Music Group. His music has been recorded on the Hat Art, ALM, Fontec, and Deutsche Grammophon labels. His scores are published by the University of York Music Press and Edition Peters.

Kondo's notable students include Linda Catlin Smith and Paul Newland.

In 2024, he was designated a Person of Cultural Merit.
