= Brice Pauset =

French composer living in Germany (born 1965)

Brice Pauset (born 17 June 1965 in Besançon) is a French composer living in Germany.

== Biography ==
Composer Brice Pauset was born in Besançon in 1965, and started his musical education by learning the piano, violin and harpsichord before turning to composition. In 1994 he was awarded a grant by the Marcel Bleustein-Blanchet Foundation and became a student at IRCAM from 1994 to 1996. He studied with Michel Philippot, Gérard Grisey and Alain Bancquart in Paris, and since then has pursued a dual career as a composer and performer of his own works as well as playing the early repertoire on the harpsichord and pianoforte and, occasionally, the modern piano.

In France, Brice Pauset regularly works with Ircam, the Festival d'Automne in Paris and the Accroche-Note ensemble, the Ars Musica festival in Belgium, Klangforum-Wien in Austria, and, in Germany, the SWR (Baden-Baden) and WDR (Köln) radios, the Musik-Biennale Berlin and the Recherche ensemble in Freiburg im Breisgau. On occasion his works call for musicians unexpected in the realm of contemporary music, such as his Vanités which was first sung by countertenor Gérard Lesne with Il Seminario Musicale at Royaumont, Kontra-Sonate based on Schubert's Sonata op. 42 (D 845), which Andreas Staier performed in June 2001 in Hagen and Paris, and Schlag-Kantilene based on Beethoven's violin concerto, with David Grimal and the Philharmonic Orchestra of Radio-France, conducted by Peter Eötvös (2010). He also, among many other ensemble or chamber works, completed a six-symphonies cycle (2001 to 2009). Arditti String Quartet, together with WDR Choir and Orchestra, under Matthias Pintscher's baton, premiered Das Dornröschen (2012) in Köln Philharmony (Germany). He has written many works for the pianist Nicolas Hodges, including three books of Canons for solo piano, Symphony no. 4 - "Der Geograph", for piano and orchestra, and several etudes, the first of which was part of Hodges' Studies Project.

He has taught composition at Musikhochschule Freiburg-im-Breisgau since 2010. From 2012 to 2018, he was artistic director of the Ensemble Contrechamps in Geneva.

== Works ==
Brice Pauset's music is mostly published by Editions Lemoine, Paris, works since 2014 being published by Edition Gravis, Berlin.

=== Theatrical works ===
- Das Mädchen aus der Fremde, musical theatre on Schiller's poems "Der Tanz" and "Das Mädchen in der Fremde" (2005) for actors, dancers, choir and large instrumental ensemble. Collaborative composition with Isabel Mundry, published by Breitkopf
- WONDERFUL DELUXE, Rêves et futilités d'une idôle (2014–15), for counter tenor, five voices and ensemble, publ. by Ed. Gravis
- STRAFEN, Opera for solo voices, 6-voice madrigal, and large orchestra, (2017-19), publ. by Ed. Gravis

=== Orchestral works ===
- Six Canons - Musurgia combinatoria (2001) Orchestra
- Kataster (2015–2017) for solo ensemble and orchestra (50') pub. Ed. Gravis
- Kontra-konzert (2011) Pianoforte, orchestra and 3 percussionists
- Konzertkammer (2010-20) Piano and chamber orchestra
- Maos Frosch (2011) Orchestra
- Schlag-Kantilene (2010) Violin and orchestra
- Symphonie I - Les outrances nécessaires (2001) Piano and chamber orchestra
- Symphonie III - Anima mundi (2005) Orchestra
- Symphonie IV - Der Geograph (2006) Piano and orchestra (CD Aeon)
- Symphonie V - Die Tänzerin (2008) Large orchestra (CD Neos)
- Un-Ruhe (1. Heft) (2013–14) for soprano, harpsichord and three orchestra groups (20') Publ. Ed. Gravis

=== Ensemble music ===
- Après une lecture de Marx - I. Accumulation (2022) for ensemble and electronics (15') pub. Ed. Gravis
- APRÈS UNE LECTURE DE MARX: III. Tombeau de Mary-Ann Walkley (2018) for ensemble (15') pub. Ed. Gravis
- arbeiten. Musik mit Hebewerk (2013–15) for ensemble (20') publ. Ed. Gravis
- Autopsie de la foi (2012) Actor and ensemble
- Canons (4) - Les Saisons (1992) Solo violin and 13 string instruments
- Canons (8) (1998) Oboe d'amore and ensemble (CD Aeon)
- Concerto I - Birwa (2002) Harpsichord and ensemble (CD Aeon)
- Concerto II - Exils (2005) Solo percussion and 2 ensembles
- Harpe de Mélodie (2008) 2 percussions and ensemble
- In nomine broken consort book (2003) 8 instruments (CD Aeon)
- Kinderszenen mit Robert Schumann (2003) Ensemble (CD Numérica)
- Purcell Verschriebungen (2007) Violin and ensemble
- Schwarzmärkte (2012) Ensemble
- Theorie der Tränen: Atem (2009) Ensemble
- Vertigo – Infinite Screen (2020-21) for ensemble in 6 groups, 18 picture modules and electronics, publ. Ed. Gravis
- Vier Variationen (2007) Ensemble (CD)
- Vita Nova (sérénades) (2006) Violin and ensemble

=== Chamber music ===
- Adagio dialettico (2000) Saxophone, percussion and piano (CD Assai - out of print)
- Die Vorüberlaufenden (2003) for fl(picc,A-fl), B-clar, vc (10') Collaborative composition with Isabel Mundry, published by Breitkopf
- Eurydice (1998/2015) for flute and string trio (CD Stradivarius)
- Les Voix humaines (2006) Clarinet, string trio and piano (CD Aeon)
- Ljusare (1992) Violin and piano (CD Aeon)
- Pluvia (1989) Violin, cello and piano
- Quatuor à cordes I Mèden agen (2001) 2 violins, viola and cello
- Quatuor à cordes II Das unglückselige Bewusstsein (1996) 2 violins, viola and cello
- Quatuor à cordes III ...récit-écrit (2002) 2 violins, viola and cello
- subito sempre (langsamer satz) - for Klaus Huber (2014) for fl, cl, pno, vn, vla, vc (8') publ. Ed. Gravis
- Theorie der Tränen: Gesang (2007) Horn and piano
- Theorie der Tränen: Schlamm (2008) Bass clarinet, violin, cello and piano (CD Stradivarius)
- Vestige (2007) Harpsichord 4 hands
- Wahrheitsverfahren (2014-) Harpsichord and string quartet (unpublished) (CD Winter & Winter)

=== Solo works ===
- Cadences pour le Concerto pour violon et orchestre Op.61 de Beethoven (2010) Violin (CD)
- Canons (3) (1989) Piano (CD Wergo)
- Canons (5) (2002) Piano (CD Wergo)
- Canons (7) (2010) Piano (CD Wergo)
- Canons (9) (2010) Piano (CD Wergo)
- Chaconnes (2) (1991) Viola
- De Prolatione (1996) Percussion
- Entrée (2007) Harpsichord
- Etudes (2011-) Piano (No 1, 2011, Nos 2-4 2017)
- Eurydice (1998) Flute (CD Metier)
- Kontra-sonate (2000) Piano (CD Aeon)
- Kontrapartita (2008) Violin (CD Ambroisie)
- La Nef des fous (1991) Violin
- Narration Hégémonique (2017) Accordion (3') publ. Ed. Gravis
- Pièces (6) (2005) Organ (CD Aeon - excerpts)
- Préludes (6) (1999) Harpsichord (CD Aeon)
- Rasch (2006/2025) Cello
- Theorie der Tränen: Salz (2011) Horn
- Wiegenlieder (2007) Accordion

=== Works with electronics ===
- Exercices du silence (2008) Soprano, piano and electronics
- Perspectivae Sintagma I (canons) (1997) Piano and live electronics (CD Wergo)
- Perspectivae Sintagma II (2001) Piano, 2 voices, 2 ensembles and computer
- Symphonie VI - Erstarrte Schatten (2009) Large orchestra, 6 solo voices and live electronics

=== Vocal and choral music ===
- A (1999) Soli, chorus, 2 ensembles and electronics
- Das Dornröschen (2012) String quartet, choir and orchestra (CD Aeon)
- De Aeternitate (1998) Soprano
- De Felicitate (1997) Soprano
- Demosthenes on the seashore (2004) Mixed chorus
- Deux Corps (Galathée à l'usine) (2005) 8 voices and 2 ensembles
- Die alte Frau (2013) Soli, chorus and orchestra
- Drei Nornen (2013) Soli, chorus and orchestra
- Eleusis (An Hölderlin) (1997) Soprano, clarinet and piano (CD)
- Furcht und zittern (2009) Voices and ensemble
- Gesangbuch (2003) Soprano and piano
- Gesangbuch II (2011) Alto, viola and piano
- In girum imus nocte et consumimur igni (1995) High tenor and instrumental ensemble
- L'Opéra de la lune (2012) Soli, chorus and orchestra
- M (1996) 2 sopranos, contralto and 2 ensembles
- Portrait (2007) 4 male voices and string quartet
- Sainte (2007) Voice and piano
- Studien über Dornröschen (2) (2008) Double chorus
- Symphonie II - La liseuse (2003) Voice and orchestra
- Theorie der Tränen: Louise (2009) Soprano and ensemble
- Un-Ruhe II (2016) for voice and harpsichord (CD Stradivarius)
- Vanités (2000) High tenor, soprano and ensemble
