= Georges Aperghis =

Greek composer

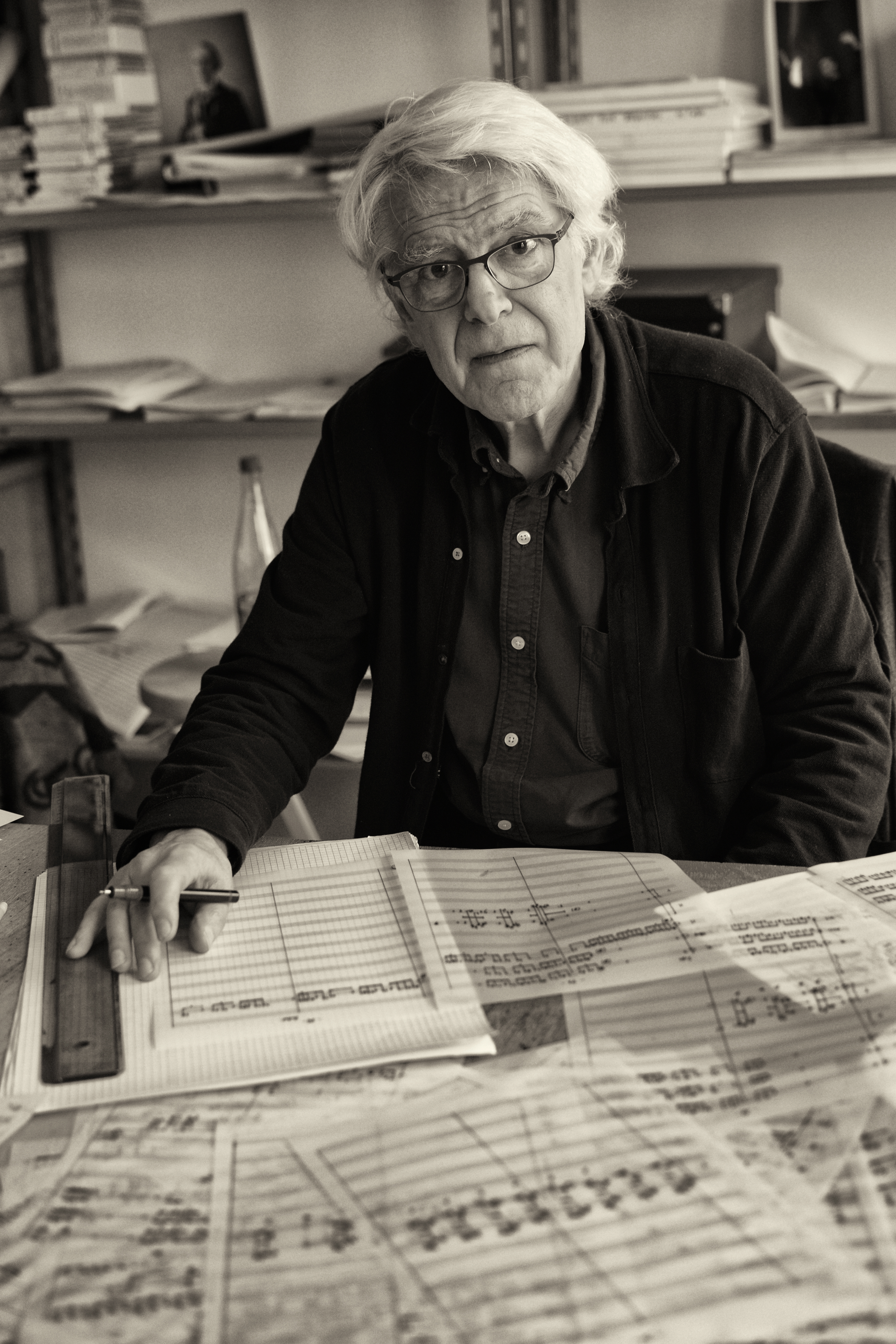
Composer Georges Aperghis in his studio

Georges Aperghis (Greek: Γιώργος Απέργης; born 23 December 1945) is a Greek composer working primarily in the field of experimental music theater but has also composed a large amount of non-programmatic chamber music.

== Career ==
Aperghis worked with Pierre Schaeffer and Iannis Xenakis and founded the music and theater company ATEM (Atelier Théâtre et Musique). He was a "composer in residence" in Strasbourg, France.

In 2011 he was the first recipient of the Mauricio Kagel Music Prize. Aperghis is honored with the 2015 BBVA Foundation Frontiers of Knowledge Award in Contemporary Music for his reinvention of music theater, using sound, gesture, space and technology and involving performers in the compositional process.

== Selected works ==
- Il gigante Golia (1975/1990) for voice and orchestra
- Histoire de loups (1976), opera
- Récitations (1977–78) for solo voice
- Le Corps à Corps (1978) for solo percussion (voice with Zarb)
- En un tournemain (1987) for viola solo
- Cinq Couplets (1988) for voice and bass clarinet
- Triangle carré (1989) for string quartet and three percussionists
- Simulacre (1991–95), series of four pieces for voice and small chamber groupings
- Sextuor: L'Origine des espèces (1992), opera for five female voices and 'cello
- Crosswind (1997) for viola and saxophone quartet
- Volte-face (1997) for viola solo
- Machinations (2000) musical spectacle for four female voices and computer
- Die Hamletmaschine-oratorio (2000) for choir and orchestra with soloists
- Le petit chaperon rouge (2001) for chamber ensemble
- Rasch (2001) for violin and viola
- Avis de tempête (2005), opera with chamber ensemble and electronics
- Wild Romance (2013), for soprano and chamber ensemble
- Trio Funambules (2014), for saxophone, piano and percussion (written for Trio Accanto)

== Personal life ==
He was born in 1945 to Greek artists Irini and Achilleas Aperghis. He lives in France and was married to actress Édith Scob until 2019 when she died.
