= Robert H.P. Platz =

German classical composer (born 1951)

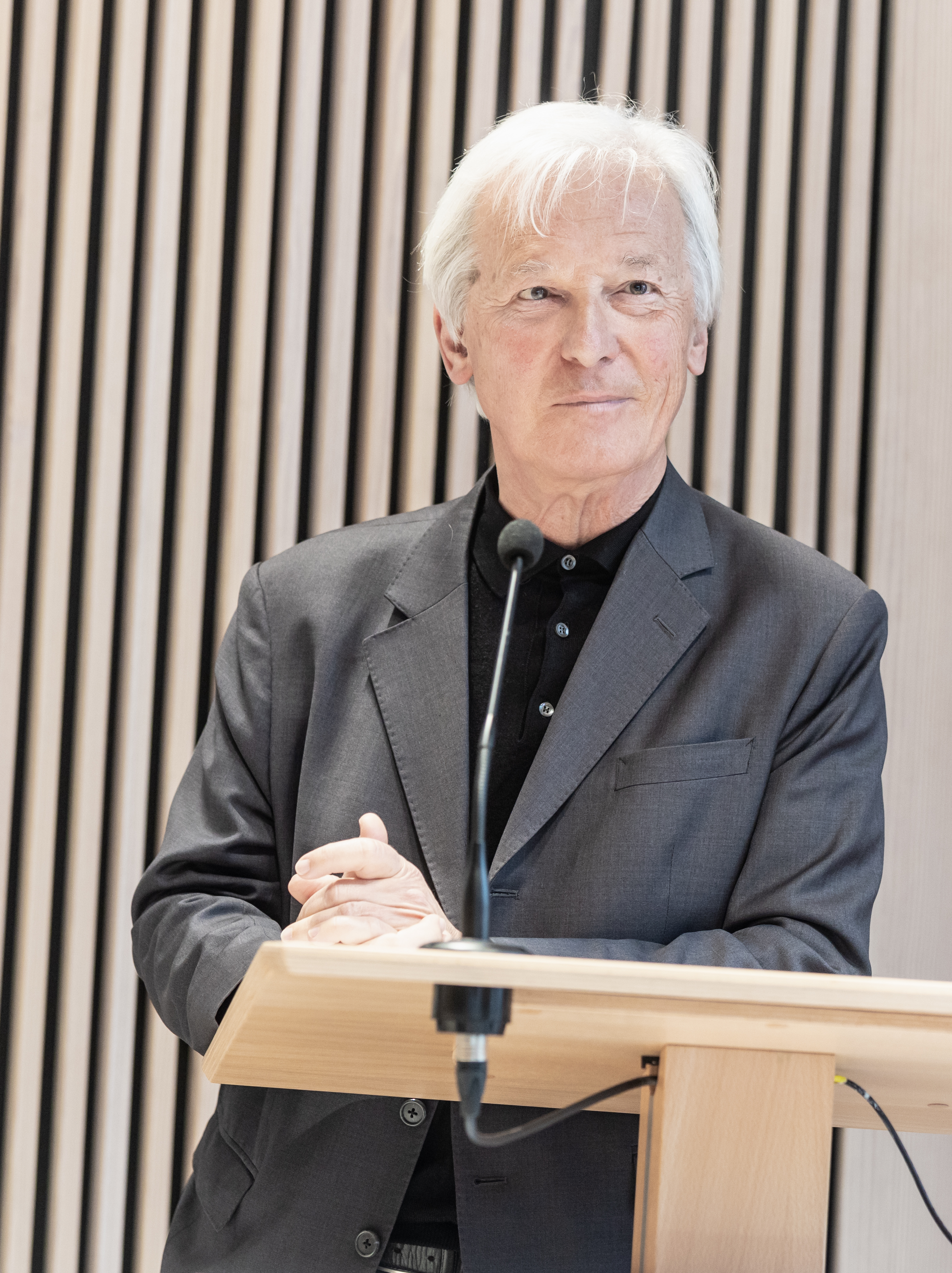
Robert Hugo Philip Platz

Robert Hugo Philip Platz (born 16 August 1951) is a German classical composer.

Born in Baden-Baden, Platz studied music theory and composition (with Wolfgang Fortner), musicology (with Elmar Budde) and piano in Freiburg im Breisgau, Germany, between 1970 and 1973. He studied later with Karlheinz Stockhausen at the Staatliche Hochschule für Musik in Cologne. In 1977 he took examinations in conducting (with Francis Travis) in Freiburg, and did a series of computer courses at IRCAM in 1980. Since 1990 he has been teaching composition at the Conservatorium Maastricht, Netherlands. Platz gives workshops and masterclasses in Poland, the Netherlands, Italy, Japan, and the United States, and he has taught at the Darmstädter Ferienkurse für Neue Musik.

Recordings of his music are published by Stradivarius, Neos, CPO, and Kairos.
