= Peter Ablinger =

Austrian composer (1959–2025)

- Ablinger c. 2010
- Born: 15 March 1959; Schwanenstadt, Upper Austria, Austria
- Died: 17 April 2025 (aged 66); Berlin, Germany
- Occupations: Composer; Academic teacher
- Organizations: University of Music and Performing Arts Graz; University of Huddersfield
- Website: ablinger.mur.at/index.html

Peter Ablinger (15 March 1959 – 17 April 2025) was an Austrian composer and academic teacher who settled in Berlin in 1982. His focus was experimental music such as a set of works called White / Whitish, of various aspects of white noise. He founded and directed an ensemble, ran festivals and co-founded a publishing house. He taught internationally, including at the University of Music and Performing Arts Graz and the University of Huddersfield.

== Life and career ==
Ablinger was born on 15 March 1959 in Schwanenstadt in Upper Austria. He attended the Graphik-HTL school in Linz and studied jazz piano from 1977 to 1982 in Graz. He also studied composition with Gösta Neuwirth in Graz and Roman Haubenstock-Ramati in Vienna. From 1982 onwards, he lived in Berlin where he taught experimental music and improvisation at the Musikschule Kreuzberg. He founded there the Zwischentöne ensemble in 1988 and directed it until 2007.

Ablinger focused on chamber music ensembles until 1994, after which he was also involved in electro-acoustics and sound installation. Beginning in 1980 he began a set of works called "White / Whitish", which deals with various aspects of white noise. The works consist of 36 parts and uses various media: instruments, installations, objects, electro-acoustic pieces, note plays, prose, plays, music without sound. In 2005 he put on a "unique opera project" in Graz. His works were played at festivals such as Vienna Festival and Neue-Musik-Festival Wien Modern. He was a co-founder of the Zeitvertrieb publishing house in 1999.

Beginning in 1993 Ablinger was a visiting professor at the University of Music and Performing Arts Graz and from 2012 to 2017 research professor at the University of Huddersfield. He lectured at the Institute for Living Voice, Buenos Aires, Columbia University, New York, Bard College, New York, Frankfurt University of Music and Performing Arts, Zurich University of the Arts, University of Music and Performing Arts Vienna, Institut für Neue Musik und Musikerziehung, Darmstadt, Manhattan School of Music, New York, and Yale University, Connecticut.

In May 2012, Ablinger was appointed as a member of the Academy of Arts, Berlin. The Academy of Arts holds the archive of his works.

Ablinger was awarded the Förderungspreis for music of the Berliner Kunstpreis in 1998, the Andrzej Dobrowolski composition prize for his life's work in 2008, and the Österreichischer Kunstpreis in 2020.

Ablinger died in Berlin on 17 April 2025, at the age of 66.

== Writings ==
- Ablinger, Peter; Gronemeyer, Gisela; Burke, Meaghan (2022). Now! : writings 1982–2021. [Germany]: MusikTexte. ISBN 978-3-9813319-8-1. OCLC 1298716149.
