= Nicolas Hodges =

Nicolas Hodges (born 1970, in London) is a pianist living in Germany.

== Early years ==
Nicolas Hodges was born into a musical family. His mother sang in the BBC Singers, including under Boulez in works by Nono. His father was a keen amateur musician, and at one time a BBC Studio Manager. He was educated at Christ Church Cathedral School, Oxford, Winchester College, and the universities of Cambridge and Bristol.

Hodges sang as a treble in Christ Church Cathedral Choir and in that capacity recorded Bach Motets (on ASV) as well as performing in Benjamin Britten's War Requiem with the City of Birmingham Symphony Orchestra under Sir Simon Rattle, in concert in the Royal Festival Hall and Birmingham Town Hall, as well as on the EMI recording of the work. He also performed with the choir in the Penderecki St Luke Passion in the BBC Proms, with the composer conducting: the concert was televised.

Hodges studied the piano with Robert Bottone at Winchester, and subsequently with Susan Bradshaw and Sulamita Aronovsky. He also took lessons with Yonty Solomon and, as a Lieder accompanist, with Geoffrey Parsons and Roger Vignoles; he studied composition at school with Michael Finnissy, and at University of Cambridge with Robin Holloway and Alexander Goehr. He also attended master classes at Dartington by Morton Feldman (1986) and Robert Saxton (1988).

== Career ==
Hodges is known mainly as a player of contemporary music. Many composers have written works for Hodges to perform, notably Elliott Carter (Dialogues for Piano and Orchestra, 2003), Salvatore Sciarrino, James Clarke, Michael Finnissy, Jeroen Speak, Konrad Boehmer, Harrison Birtwistle, Betsy Jolas and morison/opit.

Hodges still plays classical repertoire occasionally, bringing praise from critics. Andrew Clements wrote "There was the Op 77 Fantasie [...] and the late A major sonata Op 101, which Hodges played with an intelligence and insight that suggests he ought to be heard more in the 19th-century repertoire." Of a performance of Beethoven's Bagatelles op. 126, Suzanne Yanko wrote that "his performance was engrossing... What we heard was an authoritative, assured and, at times, stunning rendition of the bagatelles that brought out their many contrasts."

Hodges has recorded music by many contemporary and recent composers. His first CD was of the complete piano works of Bill Hopkins, and he has also recorded music by John Adams, Michael Finnissy, Harrison Birtwistle, Beat Furrer, Justin Connolly, Brian Ferneyhough, Elliott Carter, Konrad Boehmer and many others.

Nicolas Hodges has been a member of Trio Accanto since 2013. Hodges performs in duo with the Finnish cellist Anssi Karttunen, and with German pianist Michael Wendeberg with whom he has recorded Boulez's two books of Structures.

Since April 2005 Hodges has been Professor of Piano at the Musikhochschule, Stuttgart.

== Notable collaborations ==
=== Harrison Birtwistle ===
Hodges first met Birtwistle in 1987, at the Queen Elisabeth Hall foyer, as recounted in an interview with Tom Service:

It was in 1987 - I just went up to him and asked him if he had heard any news about the composer Morton Feldman, with whom I'd studied at Dartington the previous year, and who I knew was very ill. He told me Feldman had died that morning.

He has more piano works of Birtwistle in his repertoire than any other pianist, and has recorded all but Responses. Moreover Birtwistle composed three works for Hodges, Gigue Machine (dedicated to Hodges) and Variations from the Golden Mountain for solo piano, as well as Intrada for piano and percussion (with Colin Currie).

In his speech accepting a British Composer Award for Gigue Machine Birtwistle said of Hodges: "[He] is becoming like my Peter Pears."

Hodges has spoken of the details of their collaboration on Gigue Machine.

With Gigue Machine, we went through the whole piece ... changing the tempi to what we had ended up with. It was a very creative collaboration. If he had worked with a different pianist, they might have presented him with different options and he might have chosen different tempi.

=== Elliott Carter ===
Carter wrote Hodges the piano concerto Dialogues. The work was commissioned by the BBC and completed in 2003. It was first performed on 23 January 2004 at the Queen Elizabeth Hall in Southbank Centre, London, by Hodges with the London Sinfonietta under the conductor Oliver Knussen.

=== Pascal Dusapin ===
Hodges met Dusapin around 2002. Hodges premiered Jetzt Genau, and subsequently Slackline for cello and piano, with Anssi Karttunen. He recorded the concerto A Quia for BIS, a recording Dusapin described as "the work's real premiere". Dusapin is writing Hodges a new cycle of solo pieces, Piano Works.

=== Wolfgang Rihm ===
Hodges premiered the concerto Sotto Voce II by Wolfgang Rihm and recorded it for CD. Subsequently, Rihm composed a new version of Zwei Linien for him, which he premiered and performed in the Berliner Philharmonie, Lucerne Festival and elsewhere. Hodges also recorded Interscriptum for piano and string quartet with the Arditti Quartet, and with Trio Accanto has recorded Gegenstück. Hodges has many other works by Rihm in his repertoire.

Of their collaboration, Hodges has written:

In rehearsal for a performance of Sotto Voce II – the piece Wolfgang wrote for the Busoni Competition, and which I had the honour of premiering – he provided an exemplary example of at least one kind of performer-composer relationship. At one point the conductor turned to Wolfgang and asked (over my head, literally and figuratively) whether I was “allowed” to play a certain phrase in the way I was choosing to. Without hesitation, Wolfgang said “He’s the interpreter: he can do what he wants.” Apart from immediately resolving the power-struggle that sometimes exists between concerto soloist and conductor (I could have kissed him for that), Wolfgang’s gesture was a hugely important one for me: it was an expression of trust, and curiosity about what I would produce.

=== Rebecca Saunders ===
Rebecca Saunders and Hodges first met at Darmstadt in 2000. Hodges took part in the premiere of Chroma at Tate Modern in 2003. Saunders wrote the double concerto Miniata for Hodges, and subsequently Crimson for solo piano, Choler for two pianos (premiered and recorded with Rolf Hind), Shadow for solo piano, which was part of Hodges' Studies project. She has also composed a major trio entitled That Time for Trio Accanto, with Hodges at the piano.

In 2019, it was announced that the tenth Roche Commission would go to Rebecca Saunders. The resulting piano concerto to an utterance was premiered by Hodges with the Lucerne Festival Contemporary Orchestra under Enno Poppe in the Lucerne Festival on 4 September 2021.

=== Salvatore Sciarrino ===
Pietro Misuraca has described Hodges as "currently [Sciarrino's] favourite pianist". Sciarrino himself wrote of Hodges:

My friendship with [Hodges] was born some time ago out of the surprise that a young man could interpret, without being in touch with the composer, works as demanding as mine. I was enthusiastic not only about his technical control, but also for the familiarity and depth of his performance.

Hodges premiered Notturno No. 3, Notturno No. 4, Due Notturni Crudeli, and the piano concerto Il clima dopo Harry Partch.

== Personal life ==
Nicolas Hodges is married with four children.

He has confessed to being "a terrible record collector". He was a named supporter of the restoration by Arrow Films of Walerian Borowczyk's film Goto, l'île d'amour. In 2019, Hodges was diagnosed with Parkinson's disease.

== Bibliography ==
=== Interviews ===
- Stein, Tim: Pedalling furiously, The Independent, 19 January 2004
- Service, Tom: Sharp Shooter, The Guardian, 29 October 2004.
- Service, Tom: Expressivity and Critique in Lachenmanns Serynade in: Helmut Lachenmann Music with matches, edited by Dan Albertson, Contemporary Music Review 24 (2005), Vol. 1, pp. 77–88.
- Anderson, Colin: New Romantic, International Piano, Sept/Oct 2006, pp. 44–47
- Clark, Andrew: Nicolas Hodges and the case for ‘difficult’ contemporary music, The Financial Times, 17 January 2014
- Hamilton, Andy: To Boldly Go, International Piano, May/June 2014, pp. 62–65
- Profile: Nicolas Hodges, Tempo Volume 69, Issue 272 April 2015, pp. 100–102
- Q&A with British pianist Nicolas Hodges, Pianist Magazine, 22 March 2018
- Shaping the future of the piano concerto, Gramophone Online, 25 October 2018
- Nemecek, Robert: Ich bevorzuge die Freiheit, Piano News (Issue 4, 2018), pp. 78–80
- Brown, Jeffrey Arlo: "A Pianist Adapts to Life With Parkinson’s Disease", The New York Times. Retrieved 7 August 2023.

=== Texts by Hodges ===
- Wolfgang Rihm - zum 60. Geburtstag, UE Musikblätter 2 (December 2011–May 2012), p. 25 (abridged German translation)
- Wolfgang Rihm's Sotto Voce 2 - thoughts after the premiere, Klangspuren Newsletter 2007, expanded version (2009) booklet to Kairos CD 0012952KAI, pp. 4–5
- Peter Ablinger: Voices and Piano, booklet to Kairos CD 0013082KAI, pp. 9–10
- 'A Volcano Viewed from Afar': The Music of Salvatore Sciarrino, Tempo, New Series No. 194 (Oct., 1995), pp. 22-24
- Finella circa 1990 [tribute to Robin Holloway], Tempo, Issue 226
- Harrison Birtwistle's Chronometer: an update, Tempo, Volume 77, Issue 306, October 2023, pp. 141 – 150, https://doi.org/10.1017/S0040298223000372

=== Texts by others ===
- Mark Delaere: 'Gigue Machine and other Gigs: Birtwistle in Europe and Beyond' in Beard, David; Gloag, Kenneth; Jones, Nicholas (editors): Harrison Birtwistle Studies (Cambridge University Press, 2015.), p. 286.
- Jim Igor Kallenberg: "Intergalactic mutant music: The music of Christian Wolff and the politics of 1968. Christian Wolff in conversation with Jim Igor Kallenberg", Wien Modern 31: Sicherheit. 28.10.-30.11.2018. Essays (Festivalkatalog Band 2), pp. 90–95, esp. p. 91 on Trio Accanto and Wolff's Trio IX - Accanto.
- Pietro Misuraca: Salvatore Sciarrino - Itinierario di un alchimusico, Undamaris Edizioni, Palermo, 2008, esp. pp. 109–110
- Richard Steinitz: Explosions in November - The first 33 years of Huddersfield Contemporary Music Festival, University of Huddersfield Press, 2011, esp. p. 75ff.
- "I want to create a wide range of spaces for listening..." - Rebecca Saunders in dialogue with Jörn-Peter Hiekel, in Roche Commissions 2021 - Rebecca Saunders, Roche/Lucerne Festival, 2021, esp. pp. 26–27
