= Mark Andre =

French composer

Mark Andre (born 10 May 1964) is a French composer living in Germany. He was known as "Marc André", his birth name, until 2007, when he formally revised the spelling. He lives in Berlin. Andre's compositions durch (2006), ...auf... III (2007), and Wunderzaichen (2014) received multiple votes in a 2017 Classic Voice poll of the greatest works of art music since 2000.

== Biography ==
Born in Paris, Andre studied composition from 1987 to 1993 with Claude Ballif and Gérard Grisey at the Paris Conservatoire National Supérieur de Musique, and graduated from the École Normale Supérieure with a thesis on the music of Ars subtilior (Le compossible musical de l'Ars subtilior). In 1995 he received a scholarship from the French Foreign Ministry, which enabled him to continue his composition studies at the State University of Music and Performing Arts Stuttgart with Helmut Lachenmann (Graduation: "Großes Kompositionsexamen", 1996). In the Experimental Studio for Acoustic Art he studied electronic music with André Richard. In 1996, he was able to continue his studies in Stuttgart by a grant from the Akademie Schloss Solitude. Numerous other scholarships and residencies followed. In 2007 his large orchestral and electronic triptych "...auf... III" was played at the Donaueschingen Festival, and received the prize of the SWR Symphony Orchestra Baden-Baden and Freiburg, since which public attention has been drawn to his work even more. But even before that Andre had earned numerous major awards, such as the Darmstadt Summer Courses (Kranichsteiner Music Prize 1996).

In 2002, he received the Ernst von Siemens Composer Prize. Living in Berlin, Andre taught at the Frankfurt University of Music and at the Conservatoire de Strasbourg (2002–2007). As part of the project "...auf ...", a collaboration between the Ensemble Modern and Siemens Arts Program, in cooperation with the Goethe Institute, Andre's piece "üg", was developed in Istanbul jointly with the computer music and sound engineer Joachim Haas (Experimentalstudio des SWR) and others, and was premiered in October 2008 at the Alte Oper in Frankfurt by the Ensemble Modern. In 2009 he was appointed a member of the Berlin Academy of Arts and professor of composition at the Hochschule für Musik in Dresden. Since 2010 he has been a member of the Saxon Academy of Arts, and from 2012 a Fellow of the Berlin Institute for Advanced Study and a member of the Academy of Fine Arts, Munich. On 2 March 2014 his opera "Wunderzaichen" was premiered in Stuttgart directed by Jossi Wieler and Sergio Morabito.

== Works ==
Andre's music is published by Edition Peters in Frankfurt am Main.

- Ein Abgrund for bass-baritone, viola and violoncello based on Georg Büchner's drama "Woyzeck" (1992)
- Un-Fini III (1993–1995) for piano
- Le loin et le profond for Ensemble (1994–1996)
- Fatal for Ensemble (1995)
- AB II for double bass clarinet, cello, cymbalon, percussion, piano and live electronics (1996/1997)
- Contrapunctus for piano (1998/1999)
- Modell for four orchestra groups (1999/2000)
- ...22,13... Musiktheater-Passion in three parts (1999–2004)
- ...als... I for bass clarinet, cello and piano (2001)
- ...als... II for double bass clarinet, cello, piano and live electronics (2001)
- ...IN... for verstärkte bass clarinet (2001)
- ...zu... for string trio (2003/2004)
- asche for ensemble (2005)
- durch for saxophone, piano and percussion (2004/2005) – written for Trio Accanto
- ...hoc... (2006)
- ...auf... III (2007) for orchestra and live electronics
- iv2 for cello solo (2007)
- iv3 for clarinet solo (2007)
- ...es... for chamber ensemble (2008)
- üg for orchestra and live electronics (2008)
- hij for orchestra (2009)
- Wunderzaichen an opera (2014)
- über for clarinet, orchestra and live electronics (2015)
- woher...wohin for orchestra (2015–2017)
- ...selig sind... for clarinet and electronics (2017–2018)
- Vier Echographien (2016–2022)
- rwḥ 1–4, for choirs, large ensemble and electronics (2019/22)
- Im Entschwinden, for large orchestra (2022)
- ...selig ist..., for piano and electronics (2023–2024)

== Bibliography ==
- Tadday, Ulrich, ed. (2015). Mark Andre, Musik-Konzepte 167 (edition text+kritik) (in German). München: Richard Boorberg Verlag. ISBN 978-3-86916-393-2.
