= Beat Furrer =

Austrian composer and conductor

- Born: 6 December 1954 (age 71); Schaffhausen, Switzerland
- Education: University of Music and Performing Arts Vienna
- Occupations: Composer; Academic teacher
- Organizations: Klangforum Wien; University of Music and Performing Arts Graz
- Awards: Grand Austrian State Prize; Ernst von Siemens Music Prize; Golden Lion at the Venice Biennale

Beat Furrer (born 6 December 1954) is an Austrian composer and conductor. He has served as professor of composition at the University of Music and Performing Arts Graz since 1991. He was awarded the Ernst von Siemens Music Prize in 2018.

== Biography ==
Born in Schaffhausen, Switzerland, Furrer relocated to Vienna in 1975 to pursue studies with Roman Haubenstock-Ramati (composition) and Otmar Suitner (conducting) at the University of Music and Performing Arts Vienna. In 1985 he co-founded what is now one of Europe's leading contemporary music ensembles, Klangforum Wien, which he still conducts. Recent awards and honors include the Music Prize of the City of Vienna in 2003 and the Golden Lion, for the monodrama "FAMA", at the 2006 Venice Biennale. In 2014 he was awarded with Grand Austrian State Prize. He is the recipient of the Ernst von Siemens Music Prize 2018. Since 1991, he has served as professor of composition at the University of Music and Performing Arts Graz. Furrer is co-founder and chairman of "impuls", an International Ensemble and Composers Academy for Contemporary Music.

The 25th anniversary of the Klangforum Wien was celebrated in 2010 at the Wittener Tage für neue Kammermusik with the premiere of his Xenos-Szenen for eight voices and ensemble.

== Works ==
Since 1989, Furrer's main projects have been operatic. Critics, however, have characterized Furrer's music theatre as dryly abstract rather than sensuous. Thus, for instance, Furrer's music theatre Violetter Schnee (2018/19) was described as monotonous or, in the words of critic Matthias Siehler, a "routine doomsday": "The more Furrer invokes the global climate catastrophe and failure of communication, the more his music sounds like mere paper." Similarly, critic Manuel Brug called La Bianca Notte (2015) brainy, lacking both emotion and dramatic life. From 1999 on, Furrer's works have been published by Bärenreiter in Kassel.

=== Orchestra ===
- Tiro mis tristes redes, for orchestra (1984)
- Dort ist das Meer, for choir und orchestra (1985)
- Chiaroscuro – For R.H.R., for orchestra (1983/86)
- Risonanze, for orchestra in 3 groups (1989)
- Studie – Übermalung, for orchestra (1990)
- Face de la Chaleur, for flute and orchestra (1991)
- Madrigal, for orchestra (1992)
- Nuun, Concert for 2 pianos and orchestra (1996)
- andere stimmen, for violin and orchestra (2003)
- canti notturni, for two sopranos and orchestra (2006)
- PHAOS, for orchestra (2006)
- Konzert, for piano and orchestra (2007)
- Apon, for orchestra and spoken voice (2009)
- strane costellazioni, for orchestra (2013)
- passaggio, for choir and orchestra (2014)
- Zwei Studien, for chamber orchestra (2015)
- nero su nero, for orchestra (2018)
- Tableaux I-IV, for orchestra (2021)
- Lichtung, for orchestra (2024)

=== Ensemble ===
- Ensemble, for 4 clarinets, 2 pianos, vibraphone and marimbaphone (1983)
- Sinfonia per archi, for string orchestra (1985)
- Illuminations, for soprano and chamber ensemble (1985)
- In der Stille des Hauses wohnt ein Ton, for chamber ensemble (1987)
- Gaspra, for ensemble (1988)
- à un moment de terre perdue, for ensemble (1990)
- Narcissus-Fragment, for 26 musicians and two voices (1993)
- Narcissus-Suite (1996)
- Still, for ensemble (1998)
- Ein Lied, das über das Ende des Liedes hinaus ein anderes Ende finden wollte, for ensemble (2001)
- Invocation III, for soprano and ensemble (2004)
- recitativo, for voice and ensemble (concert version of the scene 3 from FAMA (2004))
- Konzert, for piano and ensemble (2008)
- lotófagos II, for two sopranos and ensemble based on texts by Händl Klaus and Antonio Machado
- antichesis, for 14 strings (2006)
- Xenos I, for ensemble (2008)
- Xenos II, for ensemble and voice based on a text by Händl Klaus (2009)
- Xenos III, for two percussionists and strings (2010/13)
- Linea dell’orizzonte, for ensemble (2012)
- La bianca notte, for soprano, baritone and Ensemble based on texts by Dino Campana und Sibilla Aleramo (2013)
- Canti della tenebra, for mezzo-soprano und ensemble based on a text by Dino Campana (2014)

=== Chamber ===
- Irgendwo. Fern, for two pianos (1983)
- Poemas, for mezzo-soprano, guitar, piano and marimba (1985)
- String Quartet No. 1 (1985)
- Duo for two cellos [title before 1995: Chant] (1985)
- Trio for flute, oboe or saxophone and clarinet (1985)
- Music for Mallets, for xylophone, marimba and vibraphone (1985)
- Retour an Dich, for violin, violoncello and piano (1986)
- ... y una canción desesperada, for three Guitars (1987)
- Stimmen, for two violoncelli (1989)
- Epilog, for three violoncelli (1988)
- Epilog, version for contrabass clarinet, two violoncelli, percussion and voice (1989)
- String Quartet No. 2 (1989)
- Aer, for piano, clarinet and violoncello (1991)
- Für Alfred Schlee, for string quartet (1991)
- … cold and calm and moving, for flute, harp, violin, viola and violoncello (1992)
- Lied, for violin and piano (1993)
- Time Out 1, for flute, harp and strings (1995)
- Quartett, for four percussion players (1995)
- Time Out 2, for flute, harp and strings (1996)
- presto con fuoco, for flute and piano (1998)
- a due, for viola and piano (1998)
- spur, for piano and string quartet (1998)
- Aria for soprano and six instruments [clarinet, percussion, piano, violin, viola and violoncello] based on a text by Günter Eich (1999)
- auf tönernen füssen, for voice and flute based on a text by Friederike Mayröcker (2000)
- Sei Venuta di Marzo, for string quartet and vocal quartet (2003)
- String Quartet No. 3 (2004)
- APOKLISIS, for two bass clarinets (2004)
- Invocation VI, for soprano and flute (2004)
- FAMA VI, for voice and contrabass flute (2005)
- lotófagos I, for soprano und double bass (2006)
- fragmentos de un libro futuro, for soprano and guitar quartet (2007)
- ... ferner Gesang ..., for clarinet and string trio
- Ira – Arca, for bass flute and double bass (2012)
- Canti della tenebra, for mezzo-soprano and piano based on texts by Dino Campana (2013)
- spazio immergente, for soprano and trombone (2015)
- Clarinet Quintet (2016)

=== Solo ===
- Frau Nachtigall, for violoncello (1982)
- voicelessness – the snow has no voice, for piano (1987)
- Stimme – allein, for baritone based on Leonce and Lena by Georg Büchner (1997)
- solo, for violoncello (2000)
- Phasma, for piano (2002)
- Melodie – fallend, for piano (2003)
- Drei Klavierstücke, for piano (2004)
- Studie, for piano (2011)
- Kaleidoscopic Memories, for double bass and electronics (2016)

=== Vocal ===
- Dort ist das Meer – nachts steig ich hinab, for choir and orchestra (1986)
- Ultimi cori, for mixed choir (four voices) and three percussionists (1989)
- Stimmen/Quartett, for mixed choir and four percussion players (1996)
- Psalm "Gloria tibi Domine", for mixed choir a cappella (eight voices) (1998)
- voices – still, for mixed choir (four voices) and ensemble (2001)
- Orpheus' Bücher, for choir and orchestra based on texts by Cesare Pavese, Ovid and Virgil (2001)
- Enigma I, for mixed choir a cappella in four groups (text by Leonardo da Vinci) (2007)
- Enigma II, for mixed choir a cappella (text by Leonardo da Vinci) (2009)
- Enigma III, for mixed choir a cappella (text by Leonardo da Vinci) (2009)
- Enigma IV, for mixed choir a cappella (text by Leonardo da Vinci) (2010)
- Enigma V, for choir a cappella (2012)
- Enigma VI, for mixed choir a cappella (text by Leonardo da Vinci) (2013)
- Enigma VII, for mixed choir a cappella (text by Leonardo da Vinci) (2015)
- passaggio, for choir and orchestra (2014)
- Herbst, for choir a capella (2015)
- Spazio Immergente II, for 2x16 voices and percussion (text by Lukrez (de rerum natura)) (2016)
- Akusmata, for vocal ensemble and instruments (2021)

=== Music theatre/opera ===
- Die Blinden, chamber opera in one act based on texts by Maurice Maeterlinck, Plato, Friedrich Hölderlin and Arthur Rimbaud (1989/90)
- Narcissus, opera in six scenes based on Ovids "Metamorphoses" (1992/1994)
- Begehren, music theatre based on texts by Cesare Pavese, Günter Eich, Ovid and Virgil (2001)
- Invocation, opera based on texts by Marguerite Duras (2002/2003)
- FAMA, listening theatre in eight scenes for large ensemble, eight voices and actress based on texts by Ovid and Arthur Schnitzler (2004/2005)
- Wüstenbuch, music theatre based on texts by Händl Klaus, Ingeborg Bachmann, Antonio Machado and Lucretius, as well as Papyrus Berlin 3024 (2010)
- La Bianca Notte, an opera of characters in seventeen scenes based on texts by Dino Campana, Sibilla Aleramo, Leonardo da Vinci, Filippo Tommaso Marinetti and Carlo Pariani (2015)
- Violetter Schnee based on a libretto by Vladimir Sorokin (2017)

== Bibliography ==
- Kennedy, Michael (2006), The Oxford Dictionary of Music, 985 pages, ISBN 0-19-861459-4
- Beat Furrer, Musik-Konzepte: Issue 172/173, edition text+kritik (2016) ISBN 978-3-86916-489-2
- Ender, Daniel, Metamorphosen des Klanges: Studien zum kompositorischen Werk von Beat Furrer. Bärenreiter-Verlag (2014). ISBN 978-3-7618-2235-7
