= Walter Zimmermann =

German composer (born 1949)

Walter Zimmermann (born 15 April 1949) is a German composer associated with the Cologne School.

Born in Schwabach, Germany, Zimmermann studied composition in Germany with Werner Heider and Mauricio Kagel, the theory of musical intelligence at the Institute of Sonology in Utrecht (now located in The Hague), and computer music at Colgate University in New York.

Zimmermann's works are infused by a personal adaptation of minimal technique. Whereas many early American minimalist composers were influenced in their works by rock music, jazz, and world musics, Zimmermann has drawn a great deal of inspiration from his Franconian heritage. A number of his works, particularly his groups of pieces known as Lokale Musik, use the traditional music of this area as source material. These works frequently begin with melodic material derived from Franconian folk songs, which are rearranged and transformed in novel ways.

In 1976, Zimmermann published a collection of interviews with American musicians and composers entitled Desert Plants: Conversations With 23 American Musicians.
