= Bernhard Lang =

Austrian composer (born 1957)

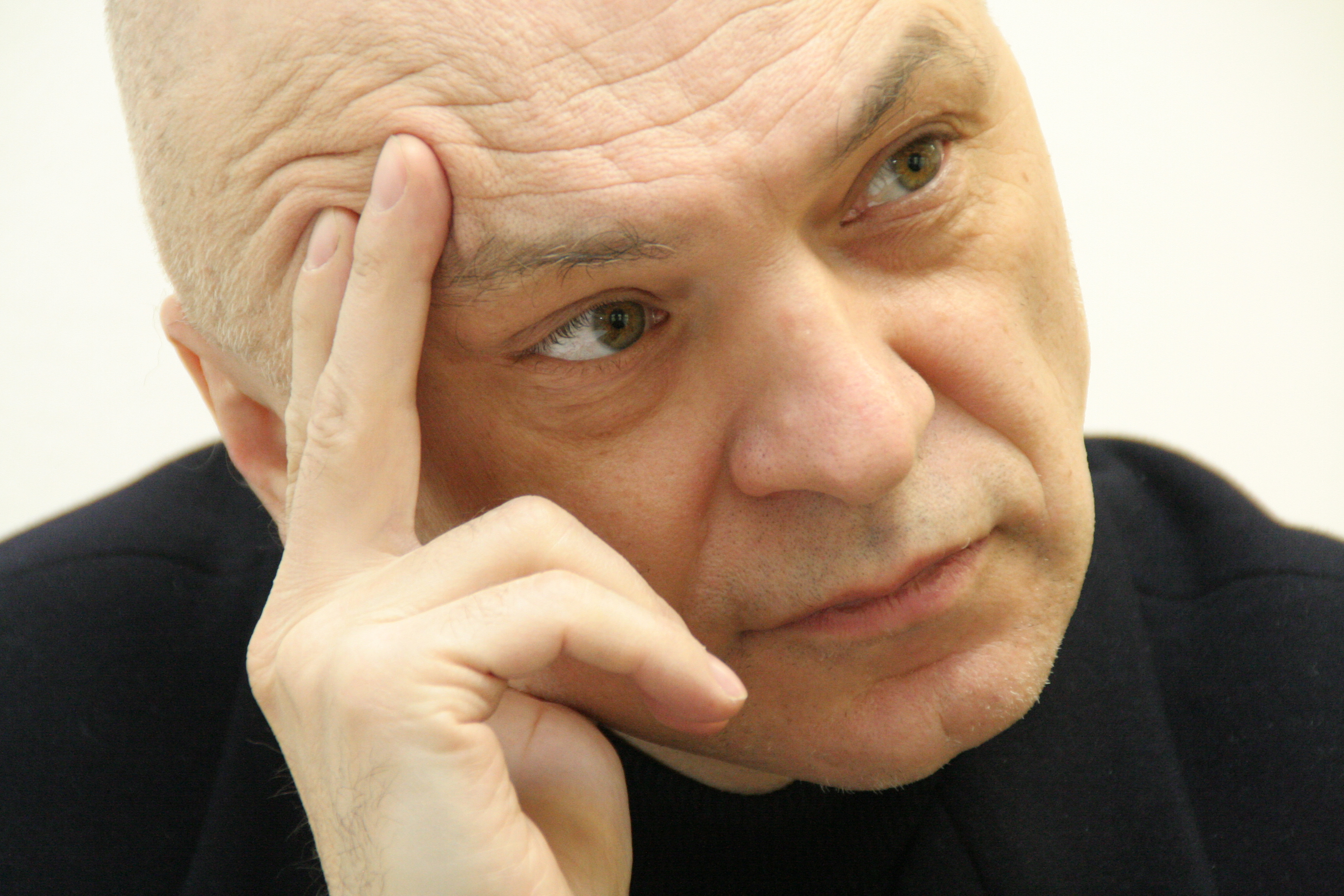
Bernhard Lang (2007)

Bernhard Lang (born 24 February 1957 Linz, Austria) is an Austrian composer, improviser and programmer of musical patches and applications. His work can be described as contemporary classical, with roots, however, in various genres such as 20th-century avant-garde, European classical music, jazz, free jazz, rock, punk, techno, EDM, electronica, electronic music, and computer-generated music. His works range from solo pieces and chamber music to large ensemble pieces and works for orchestra and musical theatre. Besides music for concert halls, Lang designs sound and music for theatre, dance, film and sound installations.

Bernhard Lang came to prominence with his work cycle Differenz/Wiederholung (DW, Difference/Repetition), composed since 1998, in which he illuminated and examined the themes of reproductive and DJ cultures based on the philosophic work of Gilles Deleuze. Sociocultural and socially critical questions, as in Das Theater der Wiederholungen/The Theatre of Repetitions (2003) are examined as closely as intrinsically musical and music-cultural problems ("I hate Mozart", 2006).

Another focus is the "recycling" of historic music, which Lang creates using self-programmed patches, applying filter and mutation processes (as in the "Monadologie" cycle).

In the works of Lang's Game series, the performers are given a set of predetermined rules by which they must guide their decisions and interactions. In other words, these works are based on the principles of controlled improvisation or determined indeterminacy.

In addition to classical European instruments, Lang also makes use of their amplified electrical counterparts (e.g. electric viola) as well as mutually microtonally de-tuned ensemble groups. Analogue and digital synthesizers, keyboards, rock music instruments (electric guitar and bass, drumset), turntables (the trailblazing instrument of the hiphop culture), rappers, Arabian singers, the spoken voice and live-electronics (mainly the self-programmed "Loop Generator") are similarly used.

== Education and career ==
Bernhard Lang studied at the Brucknerkonservatorium in Linz (Austria). In 1975, he moved to Graz to study philosophy and German philology, jazz (Dieter Glawischnig), piano (Harald Neuwirth), counterpoint (Hermann Markus Pressl), and harmony and composition (Andrzej Dobrowolski). From 1977 to 1981, he worked with various jazz ensembles as composer, arranger and pianist. At the Institute of Electronic Music (IEM) in Graz, he began his work in the area of electronic music and computer-based composition systems. From 1984 to 1989, he worked at the Conservatory in Graz while continuing his studies with Georg Friedrich Haas and Gösta Neuwirth. In 1987, he co-founded the composer's club "die andere saite" (roughly "the alternate string", a German-language pun referring also to "the other side"). Together with Winfried Ritsch, he developed the software CADMUS in C++.

In 1989, he began teaching at the Graz University of the Arts, where he was appointed Professor of Composition in 2003, a post which he held until his retirement in 2022.

Since 2000, Lang has given numerous lectures in Europe and abroad, including at the Darmstadt Summer Course, Ostrava Days, Impuls Graz, Berlin's University of the Arts, Vienna's University of Music and Performing Arts and the Vienna Conservatory, as well as holding guest lectureships in, among other cities, Munich, Zurich, Basle, Oslo, Madrid, London, New York and Paris.

Lang has collaborated with dancers and choreographers such as Xavier Le Roy, Willi Dorner, Christine Gaigg and Silke Grabinger.

In 2004–2005 Lang had a scholarship at the International Artists' House Villa Concordia in Bamberg, and in 2006 he was the featured composer at Wien Modern. This was followed by a working residency in 2007 at the Künstleratelier Thomas Bernhard Archiv in Gmunden. In 2007-2008 he was composer-in-residence at the Theater Basel, in 2008-2009 Capell-Compositeur of the Sächsische Staatskapelle Dresden and in 2013–14 guest lecturer for composition in Lucerne.

Bernhard Lang is an honorary member of Klangforum Wien and has been a member of the Akademie der Künste Berlin since 2014. According to an evaluation initiated in 2017 by the Italian music magazine "Classic Voice" by more than 100 experts in contemporary music, Lang is one of the ten most important living composers.

Lang's works have been released on numerous CDs and LPs, most notably on Kairos and GODrec.

Since 2016, Bernhard Lang's entire catalogue of works are published by Ricordi Berlin.

=== The Differenz/Wiederholung (DW) series ===
Gilles Deleuze's book Difference and Repetition marks a turning point in Lang's compositional language. The Differenz/Wiederholung (DW, Difference/Repetition) series began in 1998 and currently comprises about 40 works.

Lang uses DJ techniques such as loops and scratching in his music, and employs repetition in a variety of ways. Among these are sections that are repeated in the same form or motifs whose shape changes slightly with each repetition; automatic repetitions result from this procedure, as do continuous developments or abrupt changes. Just as important as the repetition is the difference; the question arises whether one is now hearing the same thing or whether something has changed after all. The focus is thus not only on the actual performance, but also about the individual listener's perception.

=== Music Theatre ===
Music theatre is a special passion of Bernhard Lang. There are currently about 20 works in this genre, among them:

Das Theater der Wiederholungen, based on the writings of the Marquis de Sade and William S. Burroughs and choreographed by Xavier Le Roy, was premiered at the festival Steirischer Herbst, Graz in 2003.

esc#5 Impostors, for five voices and amplified ensemble, is one of seven short operas based on a libretto by Jonathan Safran Foer. The premiere took place in 2005 at the Oper unter den Linden, Berlin.

I Hate Mozart, with a libretto by Michael Sturminger, was composed for the Viennese Mozart Year festival in 2006. It is a parody of the opera business, a behind-the-scenes look at the relationships between singers, opera conductors, managers and artists' agents.

Montezuma – Fallender Adler, based on a text by Christian Loidl, for 6 voices, choir, jazz combo, turntables, ensemble and pre-recorded electronic sounds, is a work commissioned by the Kulturhauptstadt Linz09, but was not performed in Linz. The premiere took place in June 2010 at the Nationaltheater Mannheim, with further performances in the following season.

Der Reigen, after a libretto by the Viennese writer-director Michael Sturminger and based on the play by Austrian dramatist Arthur Schnitzler, was commissioned by the German Schwetzingen Festival, where it had its premiere in 2014. Further performances followed in 2014 at the New Opera Days Ostrava and in 2019 at the Bregenzer Festspiele and at the Wien Modern Festival.

Der Golem, for voices, choir, large orchestra and jazz trio based on the novel by Gustav Meyrink and a video libretto by Peter Misotten, was premiered at the Nationaltheater Mannheim in 2016.

ParZeFool, based on Richard Wagner's Parsifal and staged by Jonathan Meese, was composed in 2017 and commissioned by the Vienna Festival, with performances at the Theater an der Wien and the Berlin Festival.

Der Hetzer, a re-writing of Giuseppe Verdi's Otello, had its world premiere at the Dortmund Theatre in 2021. In the intervals between the four acts local hip-hop artists, rappers and DJs comment on their own experiences with the opera's central themes.

Cheap Opera #2 "Playing Trump", a work commissioned by the Hamburg State Opera with a libretto by Dieter Sperl, based on original texts by the former US president, premiered in 2021.

The End of Creation. Anthropocene, premiered at the Staatstheater Augsburg in April 2022, is an overwriting of Haydn's Schöpfung. The original libretto is replaced by a new one written by André Bücker based on Lord Byron's Darkness and Jean Paul's Rede des Toten Christus vom Weltgebäude herab (Speech of the Dead Christ from the World Building). Lang's work is the last part of the full-length staged oratorio. The first two parts of Haydn's Schöpfung conform for the most part with the original, but the recitatives have been transformed by Dietmar Dath into scenes for actors. Lang composed the very different third part, which shows our planet when the human part of creation comes to an end. The work was also performed in the 2022/23 season.

HIOB, an opera for voices, choir, orchestra and jazz trio, based on Michael Sturminger's libretto after the novel Job by Joseph Roth, was premiered in February 2023 at the Stadttheater Klagenfurt to standing ovations and won the Austrian Music Theatre Award 2024 for Best First/World Premiere.

The opera Dora, based on a libretto by Frank Witzel, tells the story of a young woman who wants to break out of the sheltered environment of her family and ultimately summons the devil. The production at the Staatsoper Stuttgart was voted ‘Premiere of the Year’ 2024 in the international critics' poll conducted by Opernwelt magazine.

=== The Monadologie series ===
The Monadologie series, beginning in 2007, consists of more than 40 works. Lang calls the concept "musical-cellular processing", derived from Leibniz's Monadology. Lang's pieces are basically meta-compositions, i.e. machine-assisted reworkings of existing scores. With the use of a computer programme he developed, the original structures are disintegrated and then reassembled with the help of cellular automata and granulators, similar to the experimental film techniques of the destructivist Raphael Montañez Ortiz.

Lang uses his own works as source material, but also compositions by, for example, Beethoven (Hammerklaviersonate, VII. Sinfonie), Richard Strauss (Don Quixote), Anton Bruckner (Linzer Sinfonie –Das kecke Beserl), Puccini (Butterfly Overture, Madame Butterfly's aria Im weiten Weltall fühlt sich der Yankee heimisch), Chopin (12 Études), Arnold Schoenberg (II. Kammersinfonie) and Petr Kotik's (Many Many Women).

=== The GAME series ===
Lang has been composing pieces of the GAME series since 2016. The basis for this is experience of improvisation, e.g. with Uli Fussenegger, and with organised improvisation projects of Klangforum Wien, the Scan Projects. In the GAME pieces there is no longer a continuous score, but a collection of playing rules from which the musicians can make choices. Therefore, the pieces change with each performance.

=== The Hermetika series ===
The Hermetika series, begun in 2008, consists of choral pieces based on a collection of hermetic texts ranging from ancient mystical writings to quasi-dadaistic enigmatic codes. These can be inner voices, voices of angels and demons, happenings in trance or sleep states, the voices described in medivial grimoires. Language is transformed into sound or into imaginary meanings and signs through projection and individual interpretation.

== Festivals ==
Lang's works have been performed at numerous festivals, such as Moscow Alternativa Festival, Moscow Modern, resistance fluctuations Los Angeles 1998, Tage Absoluter Musik Allentsteig I und II, Klangarten, Herbstfestival Lissabon 1998, Steirischer Herbst Graz, Wien Modern, Münchner Opernfestspiele, Darmstädter Ferienkurse, Donaueschingen Festival, Salzburg Festival, Disturbances – Music Theater Workshop Copenhagen 2003, Moving Sounds Festival New York 2010, Wittener Tage für neue Kammermusik, Impuls Tanz Wien, MaerzMusik Berlin, Warsaw Autumn, Contempuls Prague, Eclat Stuttgart, Edinburgh International Festival, Suntory Hall Summer Festival Tokyo, ManiFeste Festival Paris, and Ostrava Days.

== Awards and honors ==
- Music Prize, City of Graz 1986
- 1st Prize Alpe-Adria Composition Competition 1988
- Sponsorship "Musikprotokoll" Graz 1988
- Special Honour of the Federal Council of Science, Austria
- Andrej Dobrowolski Price Styria 2001
- Anton Bruckner Sponsorship Upper Austria 2001
- Sponsorship International Artist House Villa Concordia in Bamberg 2004/05
- Central Composer at Wien Modern (Vienna Modern)
- Capell-Compositeur of the "Sächsische Staatskapelle" Dresden 2008/09
- Music Prize City of Vienna 2008
- "Erste Bank" Composition Award 2009
- "Outstanding Artist Award" in the category of music (composition) from the Austrian Federal Ministry of Art and Culture 2014
- Austrian Art Prize for Music in 2019

== Works (selection) ==
Lang's entire catalogue of works are published by Ricordi.

=== Stage works ===
- Versuch über Drei Traumkongruenzen (1990) after a text by Günther Freitag for an actor, a female singer, a cellist and live electronics. WP Forum Stadtpark Graz 1990
- Das Theater der Wiederholungen (2000–2002). Music theatre based on texts by Marquis de Sade, William S. Burroughs, trial records and testimonies of eyewitnesses. WP Styrian Autumn Festival Graz 2003
- Schachoper (2005), based on a concept by Zenita Komad. Premiere Kunsthalle Wien 2005
- esc#5 Impostors (2005). Music theatre for 5 voices and amplified ensemble after a text by Jonathan Safran Foer. WP Deutsche Oper Berlin 2005
- Odio Mozart/I hate Mozart (2006). Music theatre in two acts, libretto Michael Sturminger. Wiener Mozartjahr 2006
- Der Alte vom Berge(2007). Music theatre for 6 voices and amplified ensemble. WP Schwetzinger Festspiele 2007
- Haydn bricht auf: Sieben Tage die die Welt verändern (2008–2009). Premiere by the Kabinetttheater at the Theater an der Wien 2009
- Montezuma – Fallender Adler. Music theatre based on a text by Christian Loidl for 6 voices, choir, jazz combo, turntables, ensemble and tape. Commissioned by European Capital of Culture Linz 2009, WP at the Nationaltheater Mannheim 2010
- Monadologie XXIV "The Stoned Guest" (2013). Kurzoper for 3 voices, flute, clarinet, cello, accordion and percussion. UA Vienna 2013
- Der Reigen/Re:igen. Music theatre for voices and 23 instruments after a libretto by Michael Sturminger, based on Arthur Schnitzler's Reigen. WP Schwetzingen Festival 2014
- Der Golem (2014) after Gustav Meyrink. Music theatre for large orchestra, choir and voices. WP Nationaltheater Mannheim 2016
- ParZeFool. Der Tumbe Thor (2015–2016). Music theatre for voices, choir, ensemble and 2 jazz musicians based on Richard Wagner's Parsifal. Premiere at the Wiener Festwochen 2017
- Der Hetzer (2019–2020). Music theatre based on Verdi's Otello for voices, large orchestra and choir, with 4 rap interventions. WP Theater Dortmund 2021
- Cheap Opera #1 "Répétitions" (2019). Libretto based on texts by European right-wing politicians 1926–2018. WP Berlin 2019
- The End of Creation (2020). Music theatre – transcription of Haydn's Schöpfung – based on texts by Lord Byron and Jean Paul in a libretto version by André Bücker. WP Staatstheater Augsburg 2022
- Cheap Opera #2 "Playing Trump" (2020). Libretto by Dieter Sperl, premiered at the Staatsoper Hamburg 2021
- Cheap Opera #3 (2021) for 6 voices, bass clarinet, video and live electronics. WP Donaueschinger Musiktage 2022
- Hiob (2017–2018). Opera after a libretto by Michael Sturminger, based on the novel Job by Joseph Roth, for voices, choir, orchestra and jazz trio. WP Stadttheater Klagenfurt 2023
- Dora (2021–2022). Music theatre based on a libretto by Frank Witzel

=== Orchestra music ===
- Kohelet for choir, orchestra and soloists (1987). WP Belgrade 1988
- La Bas à S. for low orchestra, two solistic tenor saxes and solo viola (1993). WP Graz 1993
- Felder for string orchestra (1993–1994). WP Konzerthaus Wien 1994
- Hommage à Martin Arnold 2 for large orchestra (1996). WP Grazer Musikverein 1997
- DW 7 for large orchestra and loop generator (2002). WP Donaueschinger Musiktage 2002
- DW 8 for orchestra and two turntablists (2003). Commissioned by musica viva, WP Munich 2004
- DW 11.2 "orchestra loops #2" for orchestra (2003). WP Weimar 2005
- DW 14 for saxophone, jazz trio and orchestra loops (2004). WP Konzerthaus Wien 2005
- DW 17 Doubles/Schatten II (2004) for e-viola, e-cello und surround orchestra. WP Donaueschinger Musiktage 2005
- Monadologie I for e-zither and large orchestra (2007). Commissioned by musica viva, WP Munich 2008
- Monadologie II: "A New Don Quichotte" (2008). Commissioned by Sächsische Staatskapelle Dresden
- Monadologie XIX "SacRemix... for Igor" for large orchestra (2012)
- Monadologie XIII "The Saucy Maid" for two orchestra groups in quarter-tone intervals, after Anton Bruckner's Linzer Sinfonie "Das kecke Beserl" (2011–2012). WP Donaueschinger Musiktage 2013
- Monadologie XXIII "...For Stanley K." for large orchestra. Commissioned by the RSO for Wien Modern 2013
- Monadologie XXV "10 Paintings" based on artworks by Lisa-Abbott-Canfield for large orchestra (2013)
- DW 28 "Loops for Davis" for bass clarinet, sampler and orchestra (2016). WP Donaueschinger Musiktage 2017
- Monadologie XXXIV "... for Ludvik" for orchestra and pianoforte (2016). WP Beethovenfest Bonn 2018
- Monadologie XXXVII "Loops for Leoš" for large orchestra (2017). WP Ostrava 2017
- Monadologie XXXIX for violin and orchestra (2018–2019). Commissioned by musica viva, WP Munich 2020
- Monadologie XXXIX for violin and orchestra (2018–2019). Commissioned by musica viva, WP Munich 2020
- Game XXII for three orchestras (2024). WP Ostrava Days 2025

=== Ensemble music ===
- Deformazioni della Notte for recorders, string orchestra and percussion. WP Graz 1987
- Rondell-Remise for mobile chamber ensemble, mezzo-soprano and viola. WP Intro-Spection Graz 1993
- Icht I for mezzo-soprano and 8 instruments. WP Hannover 1997
- Schrift/Bild/Schrift for amplified ensemble (1998). WP Bludenz 1998
- DW 2 for amplified chamber ensemble and 3 voices (1999). WP Musikprotokoll Graz 1999
- DW 5 for 14 instruments and tape (2000)
- DW 9 "Puppe/Tulpe" for voice and 8 instruments after texts by Christian Loidl (2003). Wittener Tage für neue Kammermusik 2003
- DW 13 "the lotos pond" for 2 ensembles (2003)
- DW 16 "Songbook I" (2004) for voice, saxophone, keyboards and percussion. WP Wittener Tage für neue Kammermusik 2005
- Die Sterne des Hungers (2007) after texts by Christine Lavant. WP Kunstfest Weimar 2007
- Monadologie III "Lamentatio/Metamorphosis" (2008) for string orchestra. Commissioned by the Sächsische Staatskapelle Dresden and the Münchner Kammerorchester
- Monadologie VII "Kammersinfonie" (2009) for chamber orchestra. Commissioned by Klangforum Wien
- TablesAreTurned (2010) for turntable and amplified ensemble after a song by Amon Düül II
- Monadologie XI "for Anton" (2010) after Anton Webern's Symphony. Commissioned by MusikFabrik Köln, WP Köln 2011
- Monadologie XII for ensemble (2010-2011). WP Bregenz Festival 2011
- Monadologie XIVa "Puccini Variations: Butterfly Overture" (2011). WP Ostrava Days 2011
- Monadologie XIVb "Puccini Variations: Im weiten Weltall fühlt sich der Yankee heimisch" (2011). Commissioned by the Nieuw Ensemble Amsterdam. WP Huddersfield Contemporary Music Festival 2011
- Monadologie XV "Druck" for 4 saxophones, 2 pianos and 2 percussionists (2011). WP Wittener Tage für neue Kammermusik 2013
- Monadologie XVII "SheWAsOne" for ensemble, based on Many many Women by Petr Kotik (2011)
- Monadologie XVIII "Moving Architecture" for voice, ensemble and choreography based on the building plans of the ACF by Raimund Abraham and texts by Rose Ausländer (2011–2012). WP New York 2012
- Epilog 2 for soprano and ensemble after texts by Primo Levi (2013). WP Wiener Festwochen 2013
- DW 24 "…loops for Al Jourgensen" for saxophone and ensemble (2014). WP Wiener Konzerthaus 2015
- DW 26 "The Exhausted" for voice and ensemble (2014), after texts by Samuel Beckett and Gilles Deleuze. WP Bendigo International Festival of Exploratory Music/Australia 2015
- DW 23c for bass clarinet, bass oboe, e-violin, e-cello, sampler, synthesizer, piano and e-guitar (2016)
- Series Six: GAME ONE for ensemble (2016). WP Salzburg 2018
- Echoes in Space for voice and ensemble (2017)
- Hermetika IX "vox angeli II" for voice, tape and 9 instruments (2018). WP Concertgebow Bruges 2019
- Monadologie XXXIX.2 Redux for violin and ensemble (2020)
- The Travel Agency is on Fire for voice, 5 instruments, playback, video and live-loops (2020). Text William S. Burroughs. WP Basel 2023
- Das Hirn for voice, 8 instruments and video (2021). Text Friedrich Dürrenmatt. WP Basel 2022
- Echoes in Space 2 Redux for voice and ensemble (2021)
- DW 23d "…loops for Dr. X, the Japanese Version. An Hommage à Boris Karloff" (2013/2022)
- GAME 12 "For Petr Kotík" for ensemble and live electronics (2022). WP Ostrava 2022
- Monadologie XVIIIc Retexture for voice and ensemble (2022)
- GAME 13 "For Linz" for ensemble and live electronics (2022). WP Linz 2022
- A Song for Rachela (2022) for 19 instruments, live electronics and voice after texts from the Ringelblum Archive. Commissioned by Warsaw Autumn and Adam Mickiewicz Institute, WP Wiener Konzerthaus 2023
- GAME 15 "Mirror-Games" for 4 voices and string quartet (2022–2023)
- GAME 11-4-9 "Reaktor" for voice, ensemble, live electronics and video (2023)

=== Music for choir/vocal ensemble ===
- Sonett 1 for mixed choir (1990)
- Sonett 2 for mixed choir (1990)
- DW 20 "con complicatione": Hermetika I for boys' choir (2008)
- Hermetika III for mixed choir (2010)
- Hermetika IV "O Dolorosa Gioia" for double choir and 2 organs (2011). WP Heidelberg 2012
- Hermetika V "Fremde Sprachen" for bass clarinet and 7 voices (2011). WP ECLAT Festival Stuttgart 2013
- Hermetika VI – Sisyphos-Fragmente, 7 pieces for large choir after a text by Homer (2015). WP Wien 2015
- Hermetika VII for E-Bass + FX and 8 voices (2016). WP Heidelberg 2018
- Hermetika VIII for bagpipes and 24 voices (2017). WP Brest, France 2019

=== Chamber music ===
- Necronomicon for clarinet, violin, violoncello and piano (1985). WP Die Andere Saite Graz 1986
- Neue Tänze for violin and piano (1985). WP Die Andere Saite Graz 1987
- Zeitmasken for string quartet (1986). WP Die Andere Saite Graz 1987
- Relief for flute, viola and harp (1988). WP Die Andere Saite Graz 1989
- Stele for 2 quarter tone detuned pianos (1988). WP Musikprotokoll Graz 1988
- Romanze for piano (1988). WP Klangzeichen 1992
- Mozart 1789 for actress and nine tape recorders (1989). WP Styriarte Graz 1989
- Zwischen Morgen und Mitternacht for piano and string quartet (1989). WP Die Andere Saite Graz 1990
- Modern Monsters. 12 kleine Stücke for violoncello and piano (1990). WP Open Music Graz 1991
- Quartett für Flöte solo (1991). WP Alternativa Moskau 1991
- 2. Streichquartett "Kleine Welten" (1991). WP Musikprotokoll Graz 1991, Arditti Quartett
- Küstenlinien for two pianos and double percussion (1992). WP Tallinn 1992
- Brüche for clarinet, string quartet and prepared piano (1992). WP Lange Nacht der Neuen Klänge, Konzerthaus Wien 1992
- Versuch über das Vergessen 2 for violin, electric guitar and live electronics (1995). WP Musikprotokoll Graz 1995
- Schrift 2 for violoncello solo (1996). WP Bludenz 1997
- Schrift 1 for flute solo (1996). WP Bratislava 1997
- Schrift 3 for accordion solo (1997)
- 60 FOR G. for saxophone quartet (1997). WP Berlin 1997
- DW 1 for flute, violoncello and piano (1998)
- Schrift 1.2 for flute solo (new version of Schrift 1) (1998)
- Schrift/Fragment 4 for trumpet, horn and trombone (1998). WP Cagliari
- DW 3 for flute, violoncello and accordion (2000)
- DW 4.1 "letter code#1" for trombone, electric viola and piano (2000)
- DW 6b "letter code#2" for electric guitar and loop generator (2001). WP Bremen 2001
- DW 10a for koto, voice and loop generator (2002). WP Klangspuren Schwaz 2002*loops from the 4th district for double bass and tape (2002)
- DW 10b for koto, voice and loop generator (2002). WP Klangspuren Schwaz 2002
- DW 1.2 for flute, tenor saxophone and piano (2002). WP Freiburg 2002
- Roman Haubenstock-Ramati: Morendo Bearbeitung for electric bass flute and tape (2002). WP New York 2002
- DW 6a for electric viola, electric violin and loop generator (2002). WP New York 2002
- Epilog for voice and accordion after texts by Primo Levi (2002)
- DW 12 "cellular automata" for piano solo (2003). WP Stuttgart 2005
- DW 13b für sheng, viola, flute and loop generator (2003)
- DW 15 "Songs/Preludes" for zither and mezzo-soprano (2003)
- DW 6c for electric guitar, electric bass, percussion and loop generator (2006). Commissioned by Wien Modern
- DW 4d for viola, trombone, piano and loop generator (2007). Commissioned by Ensemble Mosaik, Berlin
- Monadologie IV for 3 percussionists (2008). WP Dresden 2009
- Monadologie VI IN NOMINE for flute, clarinet, string trio and percussion (2008). Commissioned by ensemble recherche
- Monadologie V "Seven Last Words of Hasan" for piano solo (2008–2009)
- DW21 "…and we just keep on pretending…" for flute and percussion (2010)
- DW22 "Winterlicht" for bass flute and double bass (2010). Commissioned by Riccarda Caflisch
- Standards-Project Preview: "My Funny V" for bass clarinet and tape (2010). Commissioned by WDR
- Monadologie IX, III. Streichquartett (2010) for Arditti String Quartet. Commissioned by Musiktage Donaueschingen
- Monadologie X "alla turca" für player piano (2010). Commissioned by SWR
- Schrift 5 for voice solo (2011), based on texts by Christian Loidl
- Monadologie XVI "Solfeggio" for flute solo (2011)
- Monadologie XX "…for Franz I" for piano trio (2012), based on Schubert's op.100
- Monadologie XXI "…for Franz II" for flute, violoncello and quarter tone accordion (2012), based on Schubert's op.99)
- Monadologie XXII "SolEtude for Re" by PurcelLang für countertenor solo (2012)
- Monadologie XXVIII "Seven" for flute, violin, cello, keyboard and piano (2013), adaption of Beethoven Symphony No. 7
- Songbook 3 for soprano and piano (2013), based on texts of West-Östlicher Divan
- DW 23 "Loops for Doctor X" for clarinets, violin + pickup, cello + pickup, electric guitar, keyboard and laptop (2013)
- Songbook 2 for baritone and piano (2013), after texts by Dieter Sperl and Christian Loidl
- Monadologie XXVI "...for Pauline and Conrad" for two violins detuned in quarter tones (2013), based on materials by Paganini and Bach
- Monadologie XXVII "Brahms-Variationen" for clarinet, violoncello and piano (2013)
- DW 23b "Loops for Dr. X" for Clarinets, E-flute, Cello + pickup, Electric Guitar, Keyboard and Laptop, Double Bass (2014)
- DW 25 "…more Loops for U." for Double Bass Solo (2014)
- Monadologie XXIX "London in the Rain" for flute, recorder, harp and harpsichord (2014). WP Klagenfurt 2014
- Monadologie XXXII "The Cold Trip pt. I" for 4 guitars and voice (2014), after Schubert's Winterreise. WP MaerzMusik Berlin 2016
- Monadologie XXXII "The Cold Trip pt. II" for piano, laptop and voice (2014-2015) after Schubert's Winterreise. WP MaerzMusik 2016
- Monadologie XXX "Hammer" for Hammerklavier (2014–2015), after Beethoven's Hammerklavier Sonata. WP Graz 2016
- Monadologie XXXI "for Franz III" for zither and string quintet (2015) after Schubert's C major quintet. UA Hannover 2015
- Monadologie XXVIII "Seven-Two, for Armin Köhler" for string quintet, harp and guitar (2015), after Beethoven's VII Symphony
- DW 27 "Loops for Gerry" for saxophone and piano (2016)
- Écriture 6 for soprano saxophone (2017)
- DW 16R "Songbook 1.2 ReText" for voice, saxophone, keyboards and percussion (2017)
- Monadologie XXXV "Purcell III" for mezzo-soprano, e-guitar + FX + playback (2017)
- DW 29 "Loops for Szimansky" for 2 accordions (2017). WP Wiener Radiokulturhaus 2017
- Hermetika VII for E-Bass + FX and 8 voices (2017)
- DW 31 "Loops for Edgar Froese" for extended piano four hands and playback (2017). WP Wiener Konzerthaus 2019
- Monadologie XL "Op. 81a" for piano solo (2017)
- Monadologie XXXVIII "Das Kinderspiel" for soprano and piano after W. A. Mozart (2018)
- DW 30 Loops "for Klaus Schulze" for 3 synthesizers (2017). WP Luxembourg Philharmonie 2018
- GAME 3-4-3 "for Peter Lackner" for clarinet, harp, violoncello (2019)
- GAME 4-4-4 loops for violin, clarinet, bassoon and piano (2019). WP Linz Brucknerhaus 2019
- Hermetika VIII for bagpipes and 24 voices (2017). WP Brest 2019
- Songbook 2.1 ReTexture for voice and chamber ensemble (2019)
- GAME 2-4-5 "The Mirror Stage" for 4 voices, electric guitar and ambisonic loops (2020).UA Transit festival Leuven 2020
- Monadologie XXXVI "Chopin" 12 Etudes (2016–2020)
- Songbook 1.3 for voice, saxophone, electric guitar, synthesizer and percussion (2020)
- DW 1.4 for electric guitar, tenor saxophone and piano (2020)
- GAME 5-4-2 for violin and cello (2020)
- GAME 7-4-3 for saxophone, trumpet and trombone (2020)
- Monadology MXLI "Inventio #1" for piano solo (2020)
- Loop Study #3 for zither (2021)
- DW 16.4 "Songbook 1" für Stimme, Saxophon, E-Gitarre, Klavier und Schlagzeug (2021)
- GAME 10-4-1 for harp solo (2023)
- GAME 16 "for Aleph – Happy Birthday" (2023)
- Radical Loops for 6 amplified folk violins, drumset and playback (2023)
- DW 4.3 for trombone, viola, piano and live loops (2023)
- Organ Loops Vol. 1 für Großorgel (2023)
- Intermezzo No. 1 to 4 for piano solo (2015–2023)
- GAME 10-4-1 for harp solo (2023)
- GAME 16 "for Aleph – Happy Birthday" (2023)
- Radical Loops for 6 amplified folk violins, drumset and playback (2023)
- DW 4.3 for trombone, viola, piano and live loops (2023)

=== Film music ===
- Niemandsland (1989), music for film. Intro Spection Graz
- Notes on Film 02 (2005), music for Norbert Pfaffenbichler's film
- a1b2c3 (2006), music for a video by Pfaffenbichler and Schreiber
- Mosaik Mécanique (2007), music installation for Norbert Paffenbichler's film
- BORGATE (2008), music for Lotte Schreiber's film
- Conference (2011), music for Norbert Pfaffenbichler's film. Selected for the Horizons (Orizzonti) section at the 68th Venice International Film Festival 2011
- Messenger from the Shadows (2013), music for Norbert Pfaffenbichler's film

=== Music for dance performance ===
- RETRO, room installation for Wagner-loops and one dancer (2004). Hängende Gärten, project by Cie. Willi Dorner. WP ImPulsTanz Wien 2004
- TRIKE summer, Tanzperformance Christine Gaigg (2004). WP ImPulsTanz Wien 2004
- V-Trike for a performer, soundplate and visual loop generator (2007). WP Kaaitheater Brussels 2007
- NetTrike for 2 pairs of performers, 2 performing choreographers, 2 soundplates, surround sounds plus 2 visual loopgenerators (2009–2010). WP Graz/Paris 2010
- Maschinenhalle#1 for 12 soundplates, player pianos and 12 dancers (2010). WP Steirischer Herbst Graz 2010

=== Jazz/Improvisation ===
- Paranoia for 2 rappers, band and CD recording (2007). Commissioned bei SWR, WP Donaueschinger Musiktage 2007
- Monadologie VIII: Robotika II for Big Band (2009). Commissioned by HR, WP Frankfurt 2009

=== Electronic compositions/sound installations/remixes ===
- V for 64 analogue generators (1985). WP Tage Absoluter Musik Allentsteig 1989
- Radiophones Synchronizitätsexperiment. 23 Montagen à 1' (1989). WP ORF Kunstradio 1989
- Icht II for voice, tape and live electronics (1995). WP Offenes Kulturhaus Linz, Festival "Das Innere Ohr" 1995
- Hommage à Martin Arnold 1 for tape (1996). WP Allentsteig
- I speak in riddles, sound installation based ona text by Nora Gomringer (2004). WP Bamberg, Villa Concordia 2004
- OP. 6.1 for electronics (2004). WP Mittersill 2004
- the scythe, remix of music by Christoph Dientz (2004)
- Schwarze Bänder. Hartmann-Studien (2005). Sound installation Musica Viva München 2005
- Paranoia for 2 rappers, band and CD recording (2007). Commissioned bei SWR, WP Donaueschinger Musiktage 2007
- Playhouse 8-channels sound installation for an installation by Norbert Pfaffenbichler (2008)
- Die Gläserne Kapelle, interactive sound installation in the Gläsernen Manufaktur (2008) on the occasion of the 460th anniversary of the Sächsische Staatskapelle Dresden
- Monadologie X "alla turca" for player piano (2010). Commissioned bei SWR, WP Mannheim 2010
- Loops for Ashley (2016), digital file. WP Musikprotokoll Graz 2017

== Discography (selection) ==
=== CDs ===
- Differenz/Wiederholung 2. Salome Kammer, Risgar Koshnaw, Robert Lepenik, Dimitrios Polisoidis, Wolfgang Musil, Klangforum Wien, Sylvain Cambreling. KAIROS, 2000.
- ″<trio x 3> New Jazz Meeting, Baden-Baden 2002″ (2 CDs). Steve Lacy, Peter Herbert, Wolfgang Reisinger, Christof Kurzmann, Bernhard Lang. HatHut Records, 2003.
- DW 8 | DW 15 | DW 3. Dieter Kovacic, Marina Rosenfeld, Peter Rundel, Symphonieorchester des Bayerischen Rundfunks, Martina Koppelstetter, Georg Glasl, Stefan Hussong, Michael Moser, Carin Levine. Col legno, musica viva 10, 2004.
- ″Steve Lacy: New Jazz Meeting, Baden-Baden 2002″. Steve Lacy, Peter Herbert, Wolfgang Reisinger, Christof Kurzmann, Bernhard Lang. HatHut Records, 2006.
- Das Theater der Wiederholungen (2 CDs). Anna Maria Pammer, Renate Wicke, David Cordier, Martin Wölfel, Ekkehard Abele, Alfred Werner, les jeunes solistes, Klangforum Wien, Johannes Kalitzke. KAIROS, 2006.
- I Hate Mozart (2 CDs + DVD). Florian Boesch, Dagmar Schellenberger, Andrea Lauren Brown, Salome Kammer, Vokalensemble NOVA, Klangforum Wien, Johannes Kalitzke. Col legno, 2006.
- Die Sterne des Hungers, Monadologie VII ... for Arnold. Sabine Lutzenberger, Klangforum Wien, Sylvain Cambreling. KAIROS, 2010.
- Monadologie IX ″The Anatonomy of Desaster″. Arditti String Quartet. Winter & Winter, 2014.
- ParZeFool (3 CDs). Daniel Gloger, Magdalena Anna Hofmann, Wolfgang Bankl, Tómas Tómasson, Martin Winkler, Manuela Leonhartsberger, Marie-Pierre Roy, Melody Wilson, Xiaoyi Xu, Johanna Von Der Deken, Sven Hjörleifsson, Alexander Kaimbacher, Andreas Jankowitsch, Arnold Schoenberg Chor, Klangforum Wien, Simone Young. KAIROS, 2019.
- The Cold Trip. Sarah Maria Sun, Aleph Guitar Quartet, Juliet Fraser, Mark Knoop. KAIROS, 2017.
- ″Flute & Bass″. Monadologie XVI ″solfeggio″, DW 25 … more loops for U., DW 22 Winterlicht″. Manuel Zurria, Dario Calderone. KAIROS, 2020.
- ″Works for Piano″. Monadologie V ″Seven Last Words of Hasan″. Wolfram Oettl. KAIROS, 2021.

=== DVDs ===
- ″The Return of Erich Zann″. Bernhard Langs Jazz compositions from 1978-1981, Uwe Werner and his band.
- I Hate Mozart, music theatre in 2 acts. DVD with the complete performance + 2 Super Audio CDs. col legno, 2006.

=== LPs ===
- ″TablesAreTurned″ (2 LPs). Philip Jeck, Alter Ego. GOD RECORDS, GOD 06, 2011.
- Monadologie XII (LP + CD). Klangforum Wien, Johannes Kalitzke. GOD RECORDS, GOD 16, 2013.
- DW 16, Songbook I. Jenny Renate Wicke, Trio Accanto. GOD RECORDS, GOD 28, 2015.
- Differenz/Wiederholung 2. Klangforum Wien, Johannes Kalitzke. GOD RECORDS, GOD 39, 2016.
- Cheap Opera #1 ″Répétitions″, DW 30 ″Loops for Klaus Schulze″. Lange // Berweck // Lorenz. GOD RECORDS, GOD 63, 2021.
