= Rainer Eisch =

Swiss artist

- Born: 1967 (age 58–59); Thun, Switzerland
- Education: Kunstakademie Düsseldorf, Academy of Media Arts Cologne
- Known for: New media art, Video art, Sculpture

Rainer Eisch (born 1967 in Thun, Schwitzerland) is a Swiss and German visual artist. He lives and works in Düsseldorf.

== Life ==
Rainer Eisch studied from 1992 to 1999 at the Kunstakademie Düsseldorf in the class for the "Integration of Fine Arts and Architecture" with Professor Christian Megert. From 2002 to 2004, he completed postgraduate studies at the Academy of Media Arts Cologne. Rainer Eisch lives and works in Düsseldorf.

== Work ==
For over 25 years, Rainer Eisch has been making use of the possibilities of 3D computer programs as they are used in science, research and the film industry. Unlike there, the artist does not use the technology to digitally simulate reality. On the contrary, he strives to deliberately obscure the visible. This raises questions about the possibilities and limits of digital media.

A recurring element in the artist's work is the endless loop. In his work Nous serons-nous jamais rencontrés ?, which was shown in Montreal and Cologne, he addresses this artistically.

In his pictures, video works and installations, Eisch explores the perceptive capacity of the human eye and memory processes. He is concerned with the economy of perception, which enables the viewer to couple fragments with previous images of experience.

In 2010, he produced and directed Cloudtank, a short German film that was inspired by a special effect in which artificial clouds are created using liquids.

== Exhibitions (selection) ==
- 2002: Kunstraum Düsseldorf
- 2005: Casino Luxembourg – Forum d’Art Contemporain
- 2007: Fonderie Darling Montreal
- 2008: Kunstmuseum Solingen
- 2010: Kunsthalle Wilhelmshaven
- 2010: KAI 10, Arthena Foundation, Düsseldorf
- 2010: Kunstmuseum Thun
- 2011: Kunsthaus Langenthal
- 2011: Lehr Zeitgenössische Kunst, Köln
- 2012: Kunstverein Duisburg
- 2014: MMIII Kunstverein Mönchengladbach
- 2015: Lehr Zeitgenössische Kunst, Berlin
- 2016: Kunstmuseum Thun
- 2017: Kunsthaus Interlaken
- 2018: Museum für Konkrete Kunst, Ingolstadt
- 2019 Ludwig Forum, Aachen
- 2022 Kunstraum Satellit, Thun
- 2023 NRW-Forum, Düsseldorf

== Prizes, awards (selection) ==
- 1997: Scholarship from the Aeschlimann Corti Foundation
- 1998: Travel grant from the Kunstakademie Düsseldorf
- 2006: Work grant from the Canton of Bern and the city of Thun
- 2006: Residency grant from the Shetland Arts and the City of Düsseldorf
- 2008: Funding from the Film- und Medienstiftung NRW for the film Cloudtank
- 2011: Working grant from the Stiftung Kunstfonds

== Interview film ==
Film-portrait by Lars Klosterman and Emmanuel Mir

Interview at Deutsche Welle TV Creativity, AI, and art

== Selected bibliography ==
- Rainer Eisch | Loop, Salon Verlag & Edition Köln 2024, ISBN 978-3-89770-582-1
- was du nicht weißt – eine Unterhaltung mit maschinellen neuralen Netzen, ed. Rainer Eisch, wolkenmaschine 2024, ISBN 978-3-9826168-0-3
- Dark Star, Hrsg. MMIII Kunstverein Mönchengladbach 2015, Textː Christian Krausch
- flimmernd flackern lichte Schatten, 2013, ed. Lehr Zeitgenössischer Kunst, Köln, Text: Dirk Lehr
- 01, Report Verlag – Künstler verlegen Künstler 1998, Textː Michael Krajewski, ISBN 978-3-907591-00-0

== Honorary positions ==
From 2013 to 2022, Eisch was an honorary member of expert committees of the German Cultural Council Berlin; 2016 to 2018 spokesman of the board of Deutscher Künstlerbund; 2016 to 2023 honorary board member of Verwertungsgesellschaft Bild-Kunst Bonn; 2016 to 2022 Jury member, Cultural Foundation of the Verwertungsgesellschaft Bild-Kunst Bonn (2020–22 Chairman).
