= Ramy Al Ashiq =

Palestinian-Syrian poet and journalist

Ramy Al Asheq
- Citizenship: Syrian, Palestinian, German
- Occupation: Writer
- Notable work: "The gift that killed us all" "Memory dogs" "To be gone To be here" "Walking on dreams" "we are here"

Ramy Al Asheq is a Palestinian-Syrian poet and journalist based in Berlin. He has published five poetry collections in Arabic, and his texts have been published in many literary magazines and have been translated into many languages such as: English, French, Bosnian, German, Spanish and Kurdish, as well as translating some of his texts into visual artworks, performing arts, and songs.

== Early life ==
In 2014, Al Ashiq moved to Germany with a grant from the Heinrich Böll House Foundation. A year later, he received a commendation and a recommendation for publication from the Al-Qattan Foundation in Ramallah for his book, "The Clothes of Traveling." In 2017, he founded Art magazine, the Arab-German cultural magazine. In addition to his work at Dar Al-Adab – Berlin as a curator, he is the founder of the German Arab Literature Days Festival in Berlin. In 2018, he was chosen as a Fellow of the Berlin Academy of Arts and received two literary residencies from the Artists' House (Lucas) and the Artists' Village (Schöpingen).

== Career path ==
=== Press ===
In December 2017, Al-Asheq published Art magazine, a cultural magazine in Arabic and German, and he headed its editorship, the magazine that tries to form a cultural community between the culture of the Arabic language and its speakers on the one hand, and the culture of the German language and its speakers on the other. In 2017, he was awarded the Best Foreign Entrepreneur Award by the MoneyGram Foundation for Pioneering Enterprises in Europe for his founding of the Abwab newspaper, and in December 2015 Al-Asheq published with New German Media Abwab newspaper, which was considered the first Arab newspaper in Germany and headed its editor-in-chief for two years. The newspaper, which prints more than 70,000 copies per month and is distributed free of charge in Germany. He has participated in and lectured on integration, phobias of immigrants, literature and journalism, at New York University in Italy, the annual Tatz Conference, the Friedrich Ebert Foundation, and with the Heinrich Böll Foundation in Germany. From 2014 until 2016, Al-Asheq worked as an editor for the cultural section of "Tala’na Al-Hurriya" magazine, a bimonthly print and electronic magazine distributed inside and outside Syria. He also wrote in the German press such as: taz, fluter, and also Kölner Stadtrevue.

=== Composing and writing ===
In 2014, Rami Al-Asheq published his first book, “A Walk on Dreams,” a collection of poetry about the Syrian revolution that erupted in 2011. Then, in 2015, he received a commendation and a recommendation for publication from the Young Writer Award held by the Abdul Mohsen al-Qattan in Ramallah. In 2016, Al-Asheq published his book "Since I Died," a collection of prose texts written between 2014 and 2016 in Germany, some of which were translated into German, Bosnian, Kurdish, and English. In October 2016, Rami co-authored the German ontology book Weg sein – hier sein with the German publishing house Secession Verlag.

A new book was published in 2018 by him, "The Gray, the New Pink", a literary art book produced by the Museum of World Cultures in Frankfurt on the subject of aging. It contains ten poems for the lover published in Arabic, English and German. In the same year, Al-Ashiq also participated in the French ontology book "The Decimal Value of Happiness" with the Revue de la Maison de la poésie, then in October 2018 he also participated in the German ontology book "We are here" with the German publishing house Allitera Verlag, Except for another German anthology book, The Heart Leaves No Place to Cling, with the German publishing house Ullstein Verlag. At the end of 2018, Al-Ashek published his new book, "No one noticed your death," at Maysalun Publishing and Distribution House in Istanbul.

In 2019, he published the book "The Dogs of Memory" (Gedächtnishunde) in German with the German publishing house Sujet Verlag. It is worth mentioning here that Al-Ashiq recited poems on several occasions and literary evenings in different countries, and participated in: Leipzig Book Fair (2016, 2017, 2019) Germany, Arab Literature Days Festival (2016) Switzerland, Ruhr Book Festival (2016) Germany, Literature Festival from Syria (2017), House of Literature in Munich (2017), Berlin Festival International Poetry (2017), Berlin International Poetry Festival (2018) and Munich Literature Festival (2018), Mahala Festival in Malta (2018), Focus Loreck Festival in Frankfurt (2019).

== Awards ==
- Akademie Schloss Solitude – Stuttgart (2020): Literature Fellowship for the year 2020.
- The Goethe-Institut, in collaboration with "La Mariel" and the Film Festival – Marseille (2020):
- Literature Fellowship for the year 2020–2021.
- Academy of Arts – Berlin (2018–2019): Literature Fellowship for the year 2018–2019.
- Artists' Village – Schöpingen (2018)
- A full-time literary residence for creative writing.
- The Artists' House – Lucas (2018): a literary residence for creative writing.
- Best Foreign Entrepreneur Award – Money Gram Foundation (2017): for founding Abwab newspaper.
- Young Writer Award – Al-Qattan Foundation (2015): Commendation and Recommendation for Publication on the Manuscript "Labes Tibet al-Travel”
- Heinrich Böll House Foundation (2014): literary residence and a scholarship for creative writing

=== Exhibitions ===
- "Gray, New Pink"- Frankfurt (2018–2019) – Museum of World Cultures.
- "Turn the lights on again" – Berlin (2015) – BOX Freiraum.

=== Theatre ===
- "The Queen Ordered Him to Forget" – Pierre Boulez 2020, directed by Ophira Hennig
- "Letters from within" – Art Society Braunschweig 2020
- "No one noticed your death" – Academy of Arts Berlin 2019
- "Kind Of" Haifa / Berlin (2018) directed by Ophira Hennig – produced by Schaubonne Theater
- "Journey" Leverkusen(2018) Directed by: Brian Michaels, produced by Leverkusen Theater.

== List of his works ==
This is a list of the most prominent works of the writer and poet Ramy Al Ashiq:

- "The Gift That Killed Us All" (Das Geschenk, das uns alle tötete) by Zokultur, Berlin 2019
- "Memory Dogs" (Gedächtnishunde) by Sogg, Bremen 2019
- "No one noticed your death" by Maysaloon Publishing and Distribution House, Istanbul 2018.
- "Gray", the new pink for the Museum of World Cultures and Kerber Publishing House, Frankfurt 2018.
- "Travel Wearing" on the authority of the Abdul Mohsen Al-Qattan Foundation and Dar Al-Ahlia, Amman-Ramallah 2017.
- "Since I Died" by House of Citizens, Beirut 2016
- "Walk on Dreams" by Dar Al-Ayyam, Amman 2014.
- "The heart leaves no place to hang on" (Ullstein Verlag, 2018)
- "Here we are", in German (Allita Verlag, 2018)
- "The Decimal Value of Happiness", in French (La Maison de la poésie Rhône-Alpes, 2018)
- "Being here to go" (Secession Verlag, 2016)
