= Anhaltisches Theater =

German theatre

Anhaltisches Theater Dessau
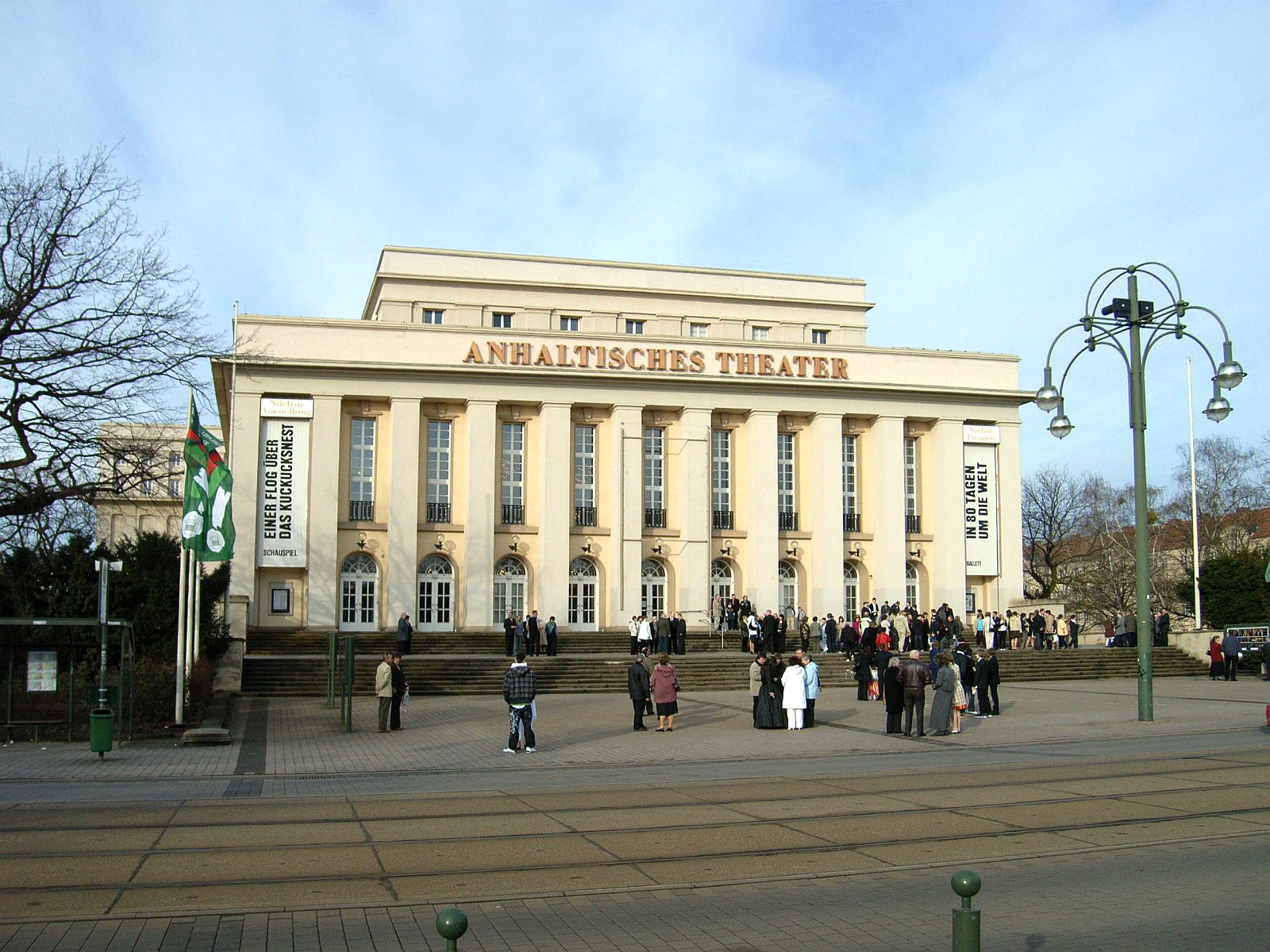
- Anhaltisches Theater (2009)
- Interactive map of the Anhaltisches Theater Dessau area

General information
- Location: Friedenspl. 1A, 06844 Dessau-Roßlau, Germany
- Coordinates: 51.8366884°N 12.2341075°E
- Year built: 1798
- Completed: 1938
- Renovated: 1935

Website
- anhaltisches-theater.de

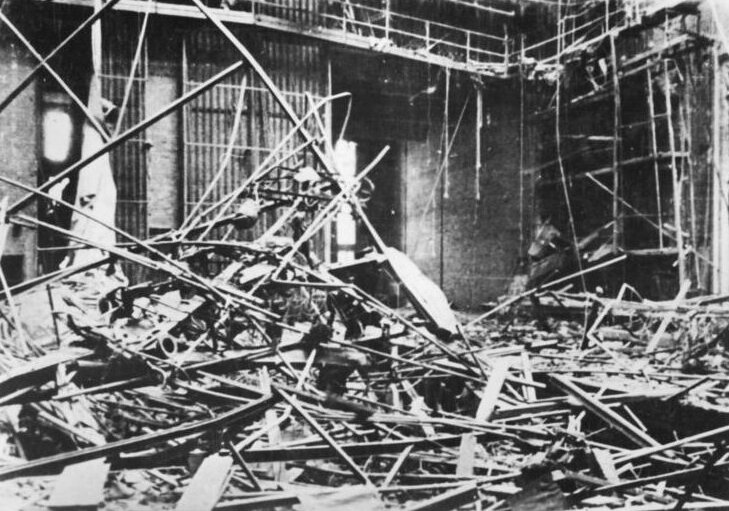
The hall in ruins after bombing, pictured in 1949 before reconstruction

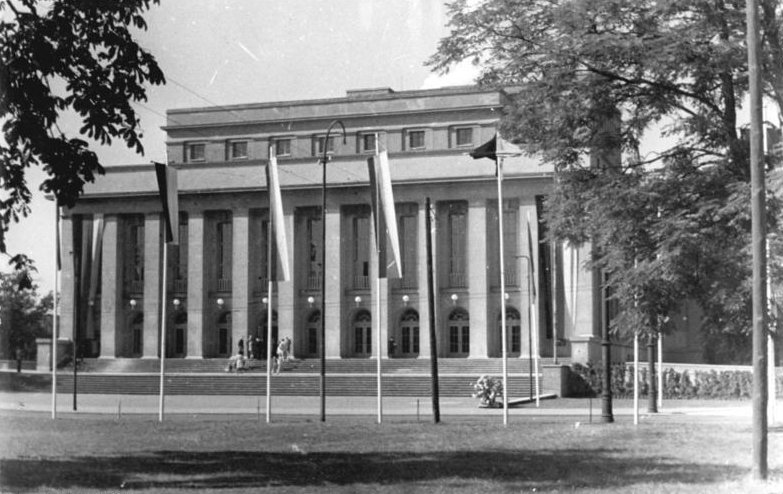
The theatre in 1949

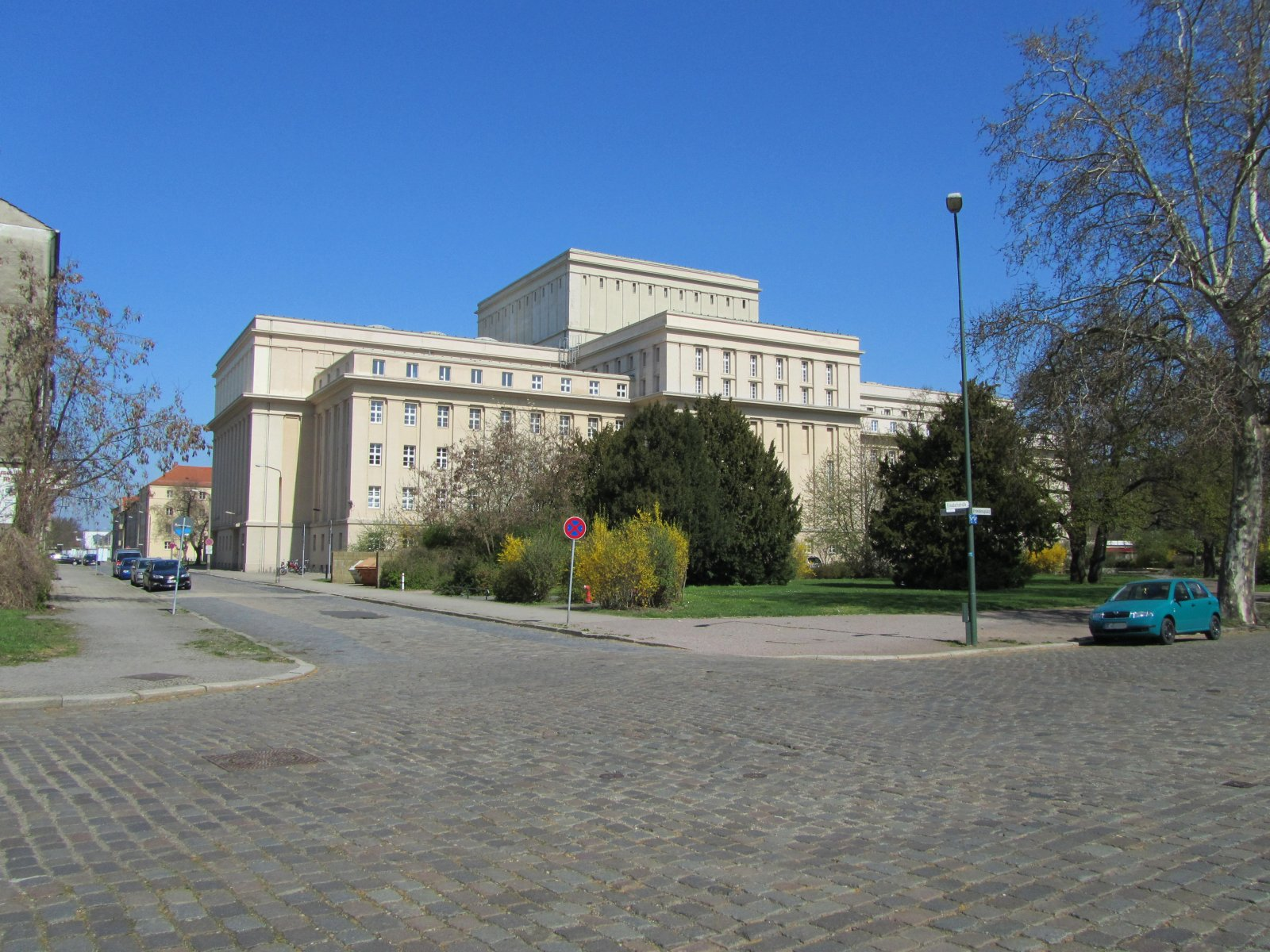
The rear in 2010

Anhaltisches Theater Dessau is a theatre in Dessau, Saxony-Anhalt, Germany, which was called Landestheater Dessau until 1984. It is Mehrspartentheater offering drama, musical theatre (operas, operettas, musicals), ballets, concerts of the Anhaltische Philharmonie orchestra, and puppetry.

Today, the theatre has a capacity of around 1100 spectators and is equipped with one of the largest revolving stages in Germany. In October 2013, the theatre was included as endangered in the Rote Liste Kultur of the Deutscher Kulturrat.

== History ==
Theatre life in Dessau has a long tradition. As early as 1794, there was a permanent theatre ensemble in Dessau. The first venue was the Fürstliche Reitbahn, and the first theatre director was Friedrich Wilhelm Bossann. The Anhalt Philharmonic Orchestra was also founded at this time.

By 1798, Friedrich Wilhelm von Erdmannsdorff (Wörlitz Park) erected the first theatre building. As Leopold III, Duke of Anhalt-Dessau had the theatre closed in 1810 for financial reasons as a result of the events of the war, the amateur project Societätstheater once again gained importance for a short time.

After two fires in 1855 (rebuilt) and 1922, the Fürstliche Reitbahn was once again the venue.

After three years of construction, the present building was completed in 1938 as the largest stage north of the Alps at the time, with 1250 seats. The architects were Friedrich Lipp and Werry Roth. The opening with Weber's Der Freischütz took place in the presence of Adolf Hitler and Joseph Goebbels on 29 May 1938.

After the almost complete destruction during one of the heavy air raids on Dessau on 30 May 1944, the reconstructed theatre was reopened in 1949 with Mozart's The Magic Flute under the directorship of Willy Bodenstein (artistic director from 1949 to 1968). In 1945, the remaining theatre staff found a provisional rehearsal and performance space, and rehearsals began again in November 1945. In December, the first performance of Beethoven's Fidelio took place. Willy Bodenstein followed as artistic director and general director:

- 1968–1973: Karl Schneider
- 1973–1983: Herbert Keller
- 1983–1992: Peter Gogler
- 1992–2009: Johannes Felsenstein
- 2009–2015: André Bücker

In 1994, the theatre, which until then had been called "Landestheater Dessau", was renamed "Anhaltisches Theater".

Due to massive cuts in the state subsidy by the state government of Saxony-Anhalt in 2013, the theatre saw its continued existence as endangered. Even by closing three sections, the savings targets could not be met. General director Bücker was a harsh critic of the cuts. His contract was not extended beyond the 2014/2015 season by the city of Dessau.

Johannes Weigand has been the general director of the Anhaltisches Theater since the 2015/2016 season. Weigand was the opera director of the Wuppertaler Bühnen until 2014.

== Awards ==
In 1954, the theatre received the Vaterländischer Verdienstorden in silver.
