= Friedrich Wilhelm Bossann =

German actor and theatre director

Friedrich Wilhelm Bossann (1756 – 27 November 1813) was a German stage actor and theatre director.

== Life ==
Born in Berlin, Bossan's origin, youth and education are unknown. As an actor, he appeared in comic and tragic father roles with the Jean Tillyschen Society in 1777, as a guest with Karl Theophil Döbbelin and later with the troupe G. F. W. Großmann. In 1786, he joined the Neuhausische Theatergesellschaft, which he took over at the age of 30 and gave it his name.

He was initially the theatre director for Prince Leopold III, Duke of Anhalt-Dessau. Today's Anhaltisches Theater emerged from the theatre ensemble he directed. His actors included, among others Ferdinand Ochsenheimer.

In 1807, he was appointed ducal court theatre director (opera and drama combined).

During the German Campaign of 1813 he volunteered to serve in the military hospital administration. There he contracted typhus, from which he died in Dessau aged about 47.

His foster daughter Dorothea Bossann, also an actress, married the theatre actor Peter Mittell in 1793.
