= Cloudtank =

German short film

- Directed by: Rainer Eisch
- Produced by: Rainer Eisch
- Cinematography: Justyna Feicht
- Music by: Michael Scheibenreiter; Stefan Kusch
- Release date: 2010
- Running time: 13 minutes
- Country: Germany

Cloudtank is an experimental German short film produced and directed by Rainer Eisch. Released in 2010, the film was inspired by a special effect in which artificial clouds are created using liquids.

== Synopsis ==
Film history knows a lot of tricks and model constructions to imitate reality. The realistic simulation of elementary forces poses a particular challenge. Almost all special effects are about simulating reality as realistically as possible in order to support or accompany the narrative story. Cloudtank neither tells a narrative story nor attempts to simulate reality. With a special effect that artificially simulates clouds, the film shows the idea of clouds and gives the viewer the opportunity to connect what they see with their own visual language and thus create their own story. Cloudtank is a short film about the creation of illusions and their dissolution. A film that uses clouds to recall images seen and imagined from memory and lets us enjoy the pleasure of illusion. When do we believe what we see, or when do we want to believe what we see?

== Installation version in exhibitions ==
- 2010: Exhibition Deception of the Eye - Special Effects in Contemporary Art, Kunsthalle Wilhelmshaven
- 2010: Exhibition ‘'Class, Institute, Workshop’', KAI 10 Raum für Kunst / Arthena Foundation, Düsseldorf
- 2019: Ludwig Forum, Aachen

== Performances ==
- 2011: Byron Bay Film Festival 2011
- 2011: fullframe Film Festival 2011, Vienna
