= André Bücker =

German theatre director

André Bücker (born 1969) is a German theatre director and régisseur.

== Life ==
Bücker was born in Harderberg, Lower Saxony.

While studying theatre, film and television studies, history and philosophy in Bochum, Bücker worked as an assistant director and realised his own productions in the independent theatre scene in Bochum, Dortmund and Gelsenkirchen. From 1994 to 1998, he was an assistant director among others with Michael Simon, Hans Peter Cloos, Sewan Latchinian, John Dew and director at Theater Dortmund. This was followed from 1998 to 2000 by a period as in-house director, senior dramaturge and deputy artistic director at the State Theater of Lower Saxony North in Wilhelmshaven.

Bücker worked for the Kunstfest Weimar and staged among others in Dortmund, Hanover, Graz, Nuremberg, Bremerhaven, Göttingen, Senftenberg, Mannheim and for the Handel Festival, Halle. He has also realised numerous cross-disciplinary projects and theatre in public space, such as kein.schöner.land. -fragment schleef (2004), Dem Gleich fehlt die Traue (2005) Kurt Weill's The Eternal Road (2006) and the large city project Auf die Plätze in September 2007. In the Dessau-Wörlitz Garden Realm he staged the Shakespeare project "Landscape - Critique of Love" (Luisium Palace Park, 2011]) as well as Goethe's Iphigenia on Tauris (Amphitheatre on the rocky island of Stein, 2013). Many of these works have been realised as collaborations, for example with the Kurt Weill Foundation for Music (New York), the Moses Mendelssohn Academy, the Standing Conference on Central German Baroque Music and the Lautten Compagney Berlin (Wolfgang Katschner). Bücker has been repeatedly invited to festivals and numerous guest performances with his drama and musical theatre productions.

From 2005 to 2008, Bücker was artistic director of the Nordharzer Städtebundtheater Halberstadt/Quedlinburg, one of the founding spokespersons of the Halberstadt Cultural Council and from the 2009/10 season he was General Director at the Anhaltisches Theater in Dessau. Here, in addition to other major projects such as "The Beggar's Opera/Polly" (after Gay/Pepusch, 2014) and Götz von Berlichingen (2015), he staged Richard Wagner's opera tetralogy The Ring of the Nibelung as a "Ring of Classical Modernism" (2013–2015) with clear references to the aesthetics of the Bauhaus. This production was shown as a cycle in May 2015 for the International Richard Wagner Congress in Dessau. His contract was not renewed by the city and his position was advertised for August 2015. He has refrained from applying again. Bücker is a harsh critic of the cuts in the cultural sector in the state of Saxony-Anhalt.

On 17 November 2015, the Süddeutsche Zeitung reported that Bücker would succeed outgoing artistic director Juliane Votteler as artistic director of the Theater Augsburg for the 2017/18 season. His directorship officially began on 1 September 2017.

Bücker is a member of the board of the Eastern Regional Association of the Deutscher Bühnenverein and a lecturer at LMU Munich. He is patron and sponsor of several projects and was artistic director of the international music festival "Himmel auf Erden - Die Kulturen der Welt zu Gast in Luthers Wittenberg" (Heaven on Earth - The Cultures of the World as Guests in Luther's Wittenberg) until 2013, which was funded by the Kulturstiftung des Bundes under the patronage of the Federal Commissioner for Culture and the Media Bernd Neumann from 2010 to 2013.
