= Akademie Schloss Solitude =

German foundation

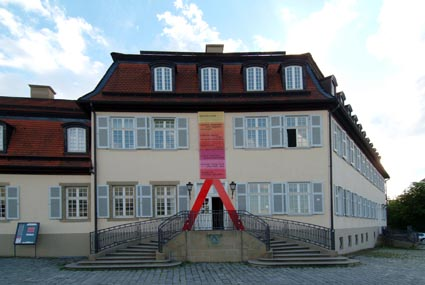
Main entrance to Akademie Schloss Solitude.

The Akademie Schloss Solitude is a foundation under public law. The main aspect of the Akademie is to promote mainly younger, particularly gifted artists and scientists by means of residency fellowships and also by organizing events and exhibitions by its residents. As an international Artist-in-Residence program, Akademie Schloss Solitude has supported approximately 1,400 young artists from more than 120 countries since opening its doors in 1990. It creates a close-knit, global and transdisciplinary network of Solitude alumni that expands from year to year.

The name Akademie Schloss Solitude unites the belief in artistic, scientific, and societal exchange with the notion of a refuge, a credo which underlays the construction of the Schloss Solitude from the very beginning. Residencies at Akademie Schloss Solitude enable fellows to devote themselves to their research projects under favorable material and intellectual conditions. For them, the Akademie Schloss Solitude becomes a transdisciplinary learning unit, a platform for communal learning outside the formal educational system, a place which is open to a broader and more diverse public. By experimenting with artistic research practices and new formats, the Akademie aims to change societal processes and to stimulate intergenerational discourse.

The artists are living and working in ready-furnished studios, that are located in the adjoining buildings of the Schloss Solitude in Stuttgart. The internationality of this institution, the interdisciplinarity in the work, which is the result of scientific and artistic exchange, and the openness to novelties are significant characteristics of the Akademie Schloss Solitude. The Akademie Schloss Solitude is subsidized by the State of Baden-Württemberg.

The founding director Prof. Jean-Baptiste Joly has been the artistic director of Akademie Schloss Solitude from January 1, 1989 until March 31, 2018. Since May 1, 2018, Elke aus dem Moore has been artistic director of Akademie Schloss Solitude.

== Fellowships ==
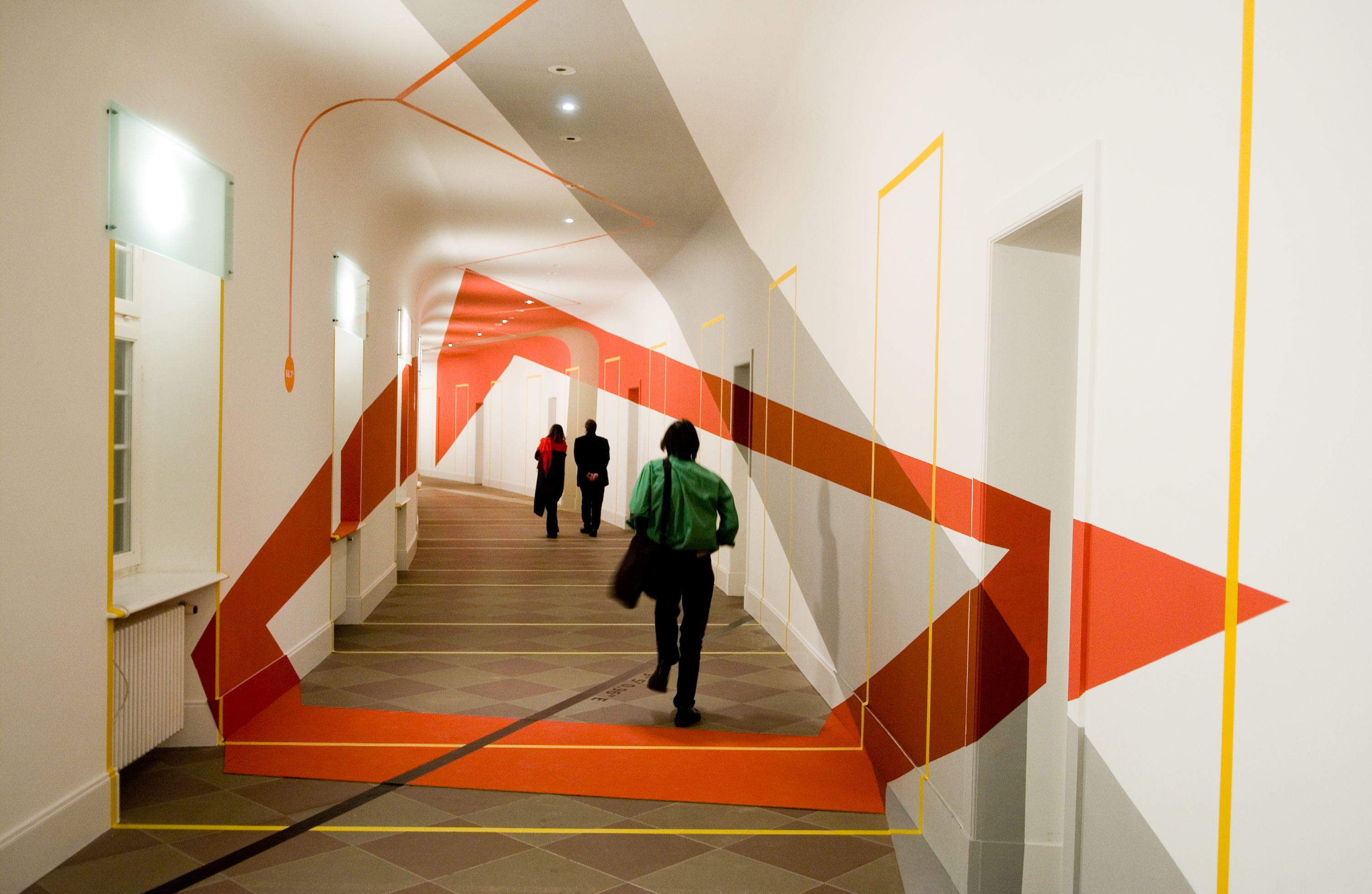
Interior view with architectural installation

The Akademie Schloss Solitude has granted fellowships since 1990. Between 50 and 65 live/work residencies are awarded for a period between six, nine or twelve months every two years.

International artists and scientists from the following spheres of practice can apply for a fellowship: VISUAL (visual arts and media), AURAL & PHYSICAL (music and performing arts), DIGITAL (digital art, gaming, digital journalism, digital publishing), SPATIAL (architecture and design), TEXTUAL (literature and language), SOCIETAL/COMMUNAL-BASED WORK (education, mediation, theory), SCIENTIFIC (humanities, social, natural and economic sciences).

For the first time in its 30-year history, Akademie Schloss Solitude is expanding its profile with the addition of a thematic focus to the 2019 application round for fellows joining the Akademie in 2020–2021. From 2020 onward, Akademie Schloss Solitude in cooperation with KfW Stiftung is launching a new program with a specific content-related focus, which a group of seven fellows is invited to investigate in any way they wish over a period of nine months. With this thematic focus, the Akademie wishes to consolidate the importance accorded by society to transdisciplinary and discursive-artistic work, providing content-related momentum.

The decision regarding the fellowships' allocation is taken by independent specialist jurors responsible for the various spheres. New jurors are appointed every 24 months.

== Schlosspost and web residencies ==
Schlosspost is a transdisciplinary online forum that addresses topics related to art, culture, society, and the digital sphere, and presents the work of international artists and scientists. It provides a platform for members of the Solitude network, including alumni, collaborators, and experts across multiple countries, and supports discussions on contemporary social and political topics. The platform also publishes open calls for thematic online issues, inviting contributions from artists and authors worldwide.

With the Web Residency microgrant (750 USD) "Web Residencies by Solitude & ZKM", Akademie Schloss Solitude supports artists, designers, technologists, hackers, and scientists who use the Internet as a production site. Open calls with varied themes are developed three times a year with invited curators. For each call, four selected artists or teams receive a four-week long web residency. These present the process and results of their online work on the Schlosspost platform. The program takes place exclusively online. The ZKM | Center for Art and Media has been a program partner since 2017.

All web residency projects as well as information on the program can be found at this link:

The Schlosspost online platform and the Web Residencies program are supported by Baden-Württemberg's ministry for science, research, and the arts.

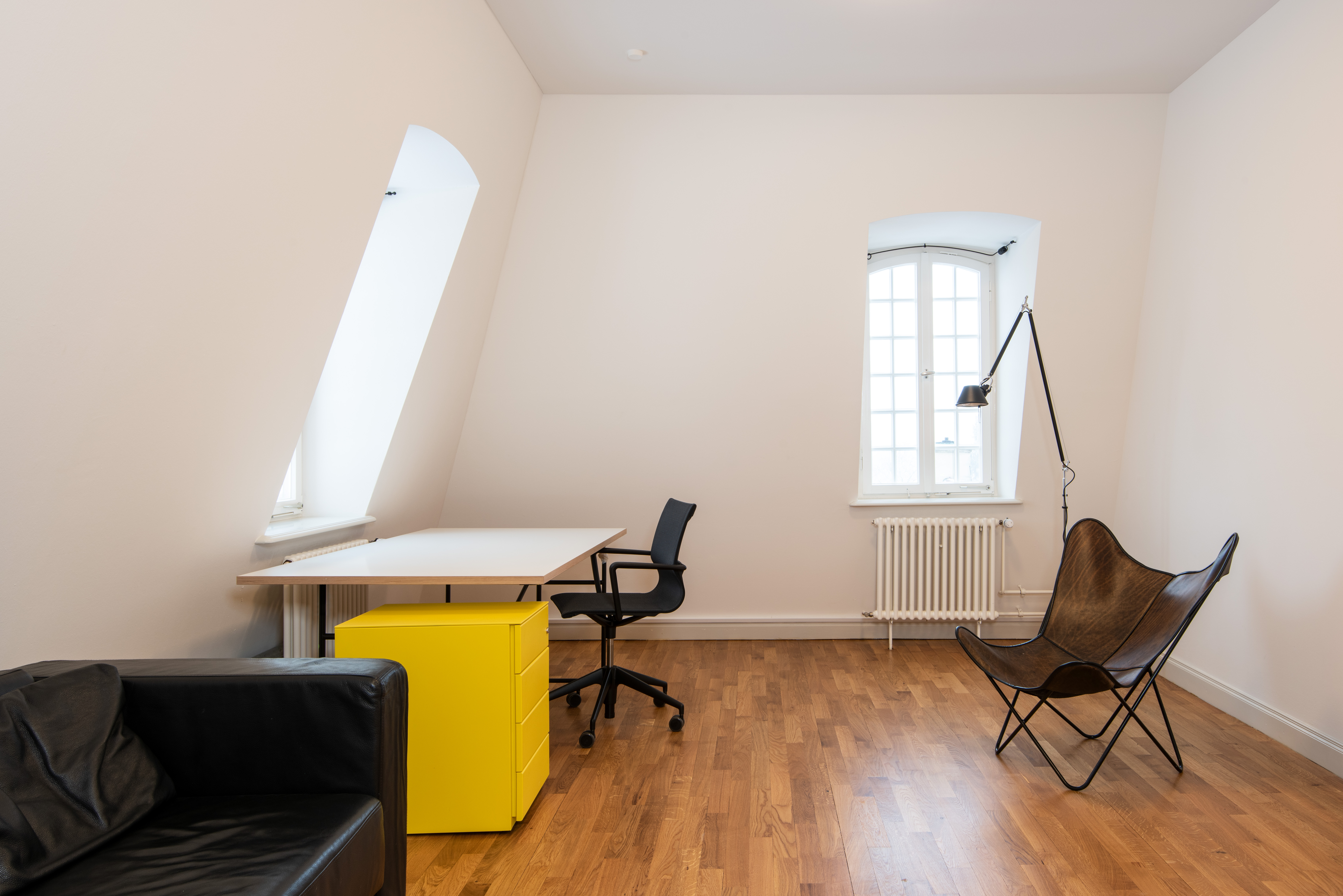
Interior of a studio.

== Jurors Generation 15 (2015–2017) ==
- Chairman of the Jury: Kaiwan Mehta (Mumbai, India)
- Architecture: Brett Steele (London, UK)
- Visual Arts: Desire Machine Collective: Sonal Jain and Mriganka Madhukaillya (Guwahati, India)
- Performing Arts: Galin Stoev (Sofia, Bulgaria)
- Design: Ute Meta Bauer (Singapore)
- International Literature: Ranjit Hoskote (Mumbai, India)
- German Literature: Ulrike Draesner (Berlin, Germany)
- Music/Sound: Jennifer Walshe (Dublin, Ireland)
- Video/Film/New Media: Nancy Adajania (Mumbai, India)
- Humanities: Kaiwan Mehta (Mumbai, India)
- Economy/Economics: Edward Soja (Los Angeles, USA)
- Social Sciences: Ackbar Abbas (Hong Kong)
- Culture & Law: Lawrence Liang (Bangalore, India)

== Board of trustees ==
- Representatives from the sphere of art: Peter Carp, Katharina Hinsberg, Florian Höllerer, Tiziano Manca, Thomas Schäfer, Friedrich Schirmer, Ika Sienkiewicz-Nowacka, Szilvia Szigeti, Manos Tsangaris, Philip Ursprung, Juliane Votteler.
- Representatives from the public sphere: Matthias Bruhn, Ursula Eid, Wolfgang Holler, Annette Kulenkampff, Christa Linsenmaier-Wolf, Márton Méhes, Alfred Odendahl, Iris Reuther, Elke Ritt, Dieter Spöri, Karen van den Berg, Jürgen Wertheimer.
- Representatives from virtue of office: Heiderose Berroth, Helen Heberer, Klaus Herrmann, Christine Litz, Brigitte Lösch, Birgit Schneider-Boenninger, Mini Schulz.
