= Frank Witzel =

German writer, illustrator, radio presenter and musician

Frank Witzel (born 1955) is a German writer, illustrator, radio presenter and musician who lives in Offenbach am Main, Hesse.

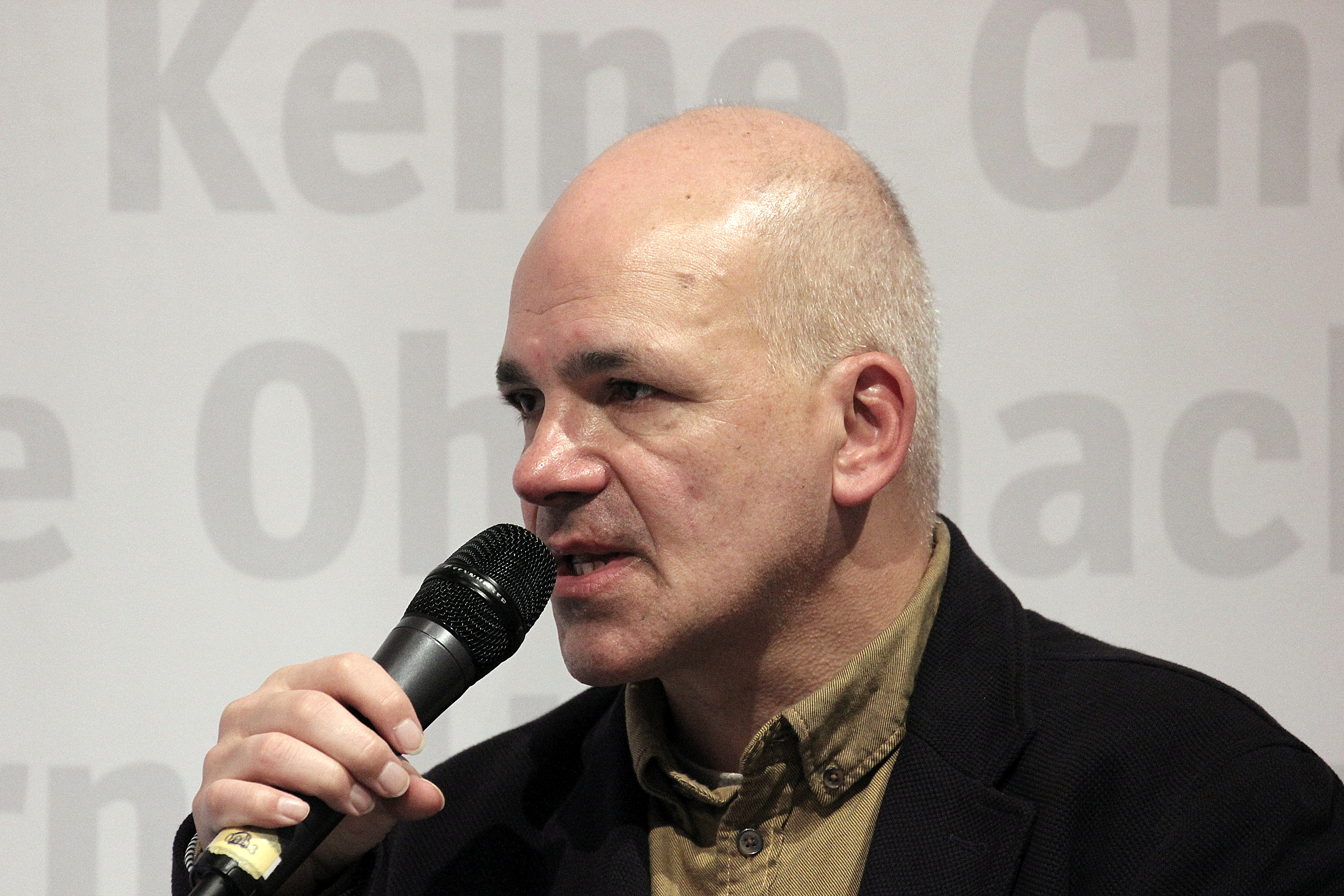
Frank Witzel at the Frankfurt Book Fair in 2015

== Life and work ==
Witzel was born in Wiesbaden, Hesse. After completing his secondary education Witzel studied at a musical conservatory in Wiesbaden having studied piano, cello and classical guitar since childhood. From 1975 onward Witzel published poems in alternative literary magazines including Das Nachtcafé, TJA and Machwerk. His first volume of poetry, Stille Tage in Cliché was published by Nautilus in 1978.

His breakthrough novel Bluemoon Baby (2001), the follow-up, Revolution und Heimarbeit (2003) and later works, include elements of conspiracy theory, espionage genre and politics in a heady mix of popular culture and literary theory that has led to his work being likened to that of Thomas Pynchon.

For his projected novel Die Erfindung der Roten Armee Fraktion durch einen manisch-depressiven Teenager im Sommer 1969, Witzel received the 2012 Robert Gernhardt Prize. This was followed by the award of the German Book Prize in 2015 for the completed 800-page novel. The jury praised its “mania, wit and formal daring and a contemporary historical perspective unique in German-speaking literature”.

In 2025, Witzel is awarded the Joseph-Breitbach-Preis.

== Publications ==
=== Novels ===
- Die fernen Orte des Versagens. Matthes & Seitz, Berlin 2023, ISBN 978-3-7518-0937-5
- Inniger Schiffbruch. Matthes & Seitz, Berlin 2020, ISBN 978-3-95757-838-9
- Grund unter Grund. Brüterich Press, Berlin 2017, ISBN 978-3-945229-15-6
- Direkt danach und kurz davor. Matthes & Seitz, Berlin 2017, ISBN 978-3-95757-477-0
- Die Erfindung der Roten Armee Fraktion durch einen manisch-depressiven Teenager im Sommer 1969. Novel. Matthes & Seitz Berlin, Berlin 2015, ISBN 978-3-95757-077-2
- Vondenloh. Textem, Hamburg 2008, ISBN 978-3-938801-48-2
- Revolution und Heimarbeit. Novel. Edition Nautilus, Hamburg 2003, ISBN 3-89401-376-1
- Bluemoon Baby. Novel. Edition Nautilus, Hamburg 2001, ISBN 3-89401-376-1; paperback edition by dtv, München 2003, ISBN 3-423-20652-7

=== Essays ===
- Kunst als Indiz. Schlaufen Verlag, Berlin 2022, ISBN 978-3-98761-000-4
- With Philipp Felsch: BRD Noir. Matthes & Seitz, Berlin 2016, ISBN 978-3-95757-276-9
- In conversation with Thomas Meinecke & Klaus Walter: Die Bundesrepublik Deutschland. Edition Nautilus, Hamburg 2009, ISBN 978-3-89401-600-5
- As author of the postscript: Ludwig Tieck: Die sieben Weiber des Blaubart. Ed. Nora Sdun, Jan-Frederik Bandel and BMW. (= Gespenster-Bibliothek, Band 1). Textem, Hamburg 2007, ISBN 978-3-938801-31-4
- With Thomas Meinecke, Klaus Walter: Plattenspieler. Edition Nautilus, Hamburg 2005, ISBN 978-3-89401-451-3
- Provinz 2001, in: Die Aktion Vol. 203, June 2002

=== Poetry ===
- Tage ohne Ende: Ein Poème Cinématique. Poems, 249 photographs and a postscript by the author. Edition Nautilus, Hamburg 1980, ISBN 3-921523-47-8
- Stille Tage in Cliché. Edition Nautilus, (Poems and illustrations by the author). Hamburg 1978, ISBN 978-3-92152342-1

=== Translations ===
- Billie Holiday: Lady sings the blues. Autobiography (Translated from the American). Edition Nautilus, Hamburg 2013, ISBN 978-3-89401110-9
- Raoul Vaneigem: Das Buch der Lüste. (Translation from the French by Pierre Gallissaires and Frank Witzel) Edition Nautilus, Hamburg 1984, ISBN 3-921523-71-0

=== Illustrations ===
- Erich Kästner: Fabian. Die Geschichte eines Moralisten. (Illustration and postscript) Büchergilde Gutenberg, Frankfurt am Main/Wien/Zürich 2007, ISBN 978-3-76325736-2
- Kästner lässt träumen (Comic, in Kultur und Gespenster, Edition No. 4/ 2007)
- Uli Becker: Das höchste der Gefühle – Erotische Gedichte. Maro, (Illustration) Augsburg 1987, ISBN 978-3-87512075-2

=== Sound ===
- With Uli Becker & Thorwald Proll: Bananenrepublik. Poesie & Geräusche zur gesellschaftlichen Wirklichkeit. 33 rpm record, Nautilus Phonographie, Hamburg 1978, DNB 891314229

=== Radio drama ===
- Die Erfindung der Roten Armee Fraktion durch einen manisch-depressiven Teenager im Sommer 1969. Adapted for radio for BR Hörspiel und Medienkunst, 2016. Directed by Leonhard Koppelmann. This adaptation received the German Audio Book award, 2017, in the Best Radio Drama category.
