= ImPulsTanz Vienna International Dance Festival =

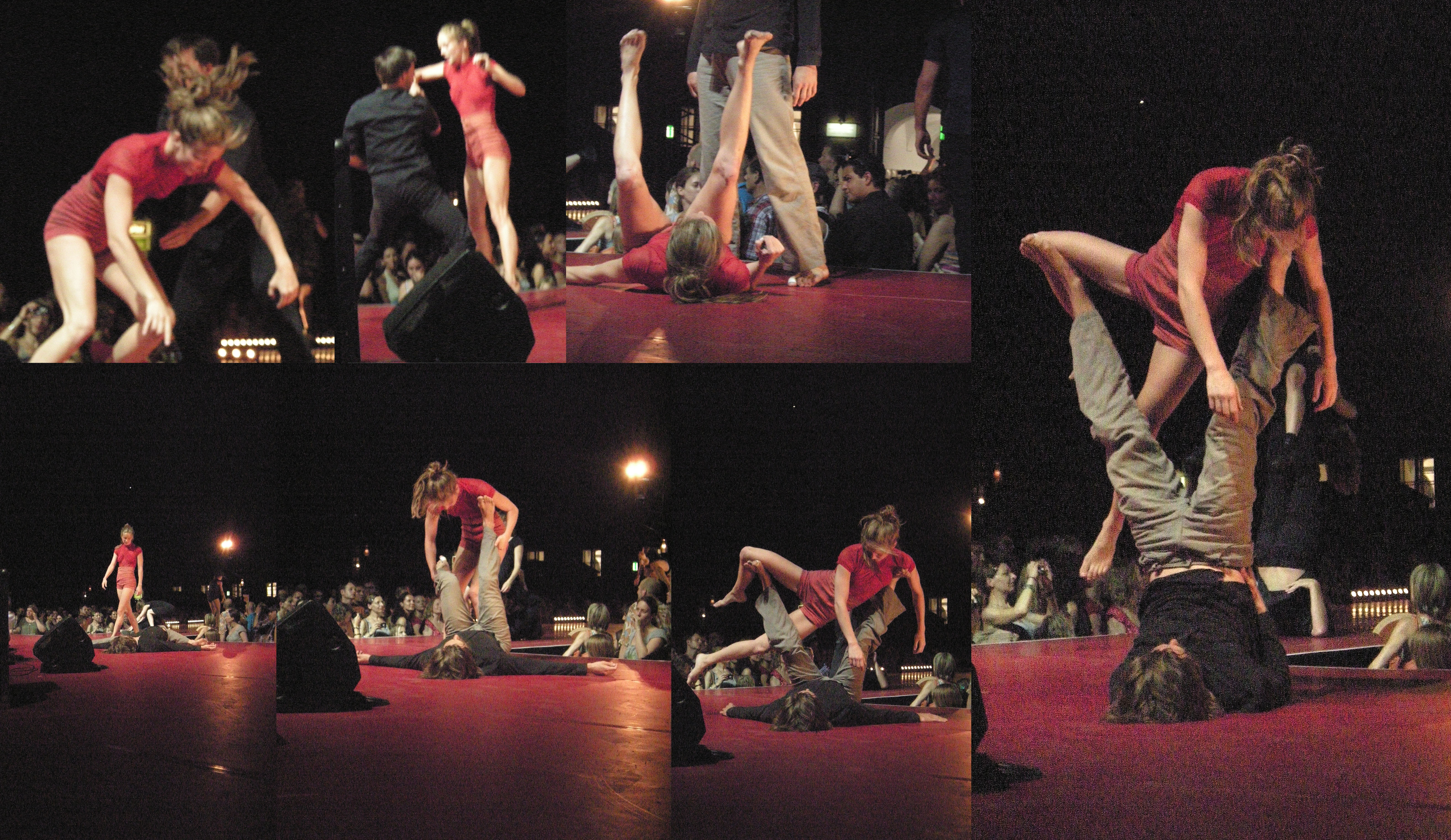
ImPulsTanz 2010 opening performance.

ImPulsTanz Vienna International Dance Festival is a major annual contemporary dance festival held in Vienna, Austria. It gathers thousands of professional dancers, choreographers and teachers for a five-week program of performance, research projects and workshops.

The festival was founded in 1984 under the name "Internationale Tanzwochen Wien", by Karl Regensburger and Brazilian choreographer Ismael Ivo, with dance teachers including Joe Alegado, Germaine Acogny and Walter Raines.

In 1988 the festival was renamed to "ImPulsTanz Vienna International Dance Festival", featuring works by Wim Vandekeybus, Marie Chouinard, Mark Tompkins, and others.

In 1996, the scholarship program danceWEB Europe was founded, allowing renowned artists participate in the festival and share ideas and knowledge.
