= German Cultural Council =

Cultural organisation

- Established: 1982 (44 years ago)
- Legal status: Registered association
- Country: Germany
- Membership: 9 (2025)
- Chief Executives: Olaf Zimmermann
- Chairpersons: Christian Höppner
- Revenue: 1,085,982 euro (2019)
- Employees: 12 (2020)
- Volunteers: 400 (2017)
- Website: www.kulturrat.de

The German Culture Council, or Deutscher Kulturrat in German, is the umbrella organization of the German cultural associations and has its headquarters in Berlin. It is a political and lobbying association, member, for example, of European Movement International. The council is funded by taxpayers.

It defines itself as a point of contact for the politics and administration of the German federal government, the German federal states, and the European Union in all cultural policy matters that overlap the individual branches of the German Cultural Council. Its purpose is to bring cross-sectoral issues into cultural policy discussions at all government levels, and "to advocate freedom of the arts, publications and information." In 2018, it called for German talkshows to be shut down for one year.

== History ==
The association was founded in 1981 as a response to the German Federal government which wanted to abolish the reduced VAT tax on books and visual media. Fifteen artist and retailer associations succeeded in their protests and next founded the council. Its main source of funding is German federal funds. Membership fees and the sale of books on cultural policy provide are a minimal part of its income.

Since its inception, it was established that the Cultural Council should become an "umbrella organization of umbrella organizations". In 1995, the working group was transferred to the fixed and more effective structure of a non-profit association. Early in the new millennium, it became the recognized umbrella organization of the federal cultural associations.

In July 2012, the association published the first edition of its "Cultural Red List" to publicize threatened or closed cultural institutions such as theaters, museums, initiatives, clubs, programs or movie houses. The analogy is with, for example, the IUCN Red List. It is published in the in-house journal Politik & Kultur.

== Organization ==
The association is features eight sections according to subject-specific subdivisions, which in turn consist of a total of 246 federal associations.

- Deutscher Musikrat

Includes: ARD, Bundesverband Musikindustrie, among others

- Rat für darstellende Kunst und Tanz
- Deutsche Literaturkonferenz
- Deutscher Kunstrat
- Rat für Baukultur und Denkmalkultur

Includes: Association of German Architects, among other

- Sektion Design
- Sektion Film, Rundfunk und Audiovisuelle Medien
- Rat für Soziokultur und kulturelle Bildung

Each of these eight independent sections is represented in the Speaker's Council and in the Assembly of Delegates of the German Cultural Council, the annual Plenum. From the circle of the Speaker's council the board of the Speaker's council is elected every two years. From 2001 to 2013, Max Fuchs was the chairman of the Speaker's Council. On March 12, 2013, Christian Höppner was unanimously elected as the new honorary president.

The managing director (since March 1997: Olaf Zimmermann) coordinates the work of the association and implements the resolutions of the executive committee, the plenum and the speaker council. He maintains contacts with politicians and administrates and develops plans and projects. The experts in the specialist committees of the German Cultural Council draw up recommendations and statements that identify areas of cultural and media policy problems and identify perspectives for action.

The German Cultural Council is a member of the European Movement International.

== Calls for shutting down political talkshows in Germany ==
In June 2018, the Council called for political talkshows to be suspended for one year, and be replaced with "more suitable contents with regards to social cohesion". A spokesman for public broadcaster ARD replied "We believe the talk shows are an enriching part of our programming."
