= Juliane Votteler =

German theatre director

Juliane Votteler (born 1960) is a German dramaturge and theatre director.

== Life ==
Born in Stuttgart, Votteler, daughter of the industrial designer Arno Votteler, studied old and New German Literary Studies, Theatre, Film and Television Studies and philosophy at the Friedrich-Alexander-Universität Erlangen-Nürnberg, the University of Vienna and the Goethe University Frankfurt

At the Nationaltheater Mannheim she was dramaturg under the direction of artistic director Arnold Petersen, at the Theater Basel under Frank Baumbauer. In Hanover, she worked as managing dramaturg at the Schauspiel under the conduct of Ulrich Khuon.

From 1993 to 2006, she was chief dramaturge at the Stuttgart State Opera and from 2007 to July 2017, she was artistic director of the Theater Augsburg.

== Productions ==
- 2014: Hänsel und Gretel
- 2014: Lohengrin
- 2015: Wozzeck
- 2015: Der König Kandaules
