= Switched-On =

Switched-On may refer to:

== Music ==
=== Albums ===
- Switched-On Bach, a 1968 electronic and baroque album by Wendy Carlos
- Switched-On Bacharach, a 1969 electronic album by Christopher Scott
- Switched-On Rock, a 1969 Electronic rock album by The Moog Machine
- Switched On Santa, a 1969 Christmas album by Sy Mann
- Switched-On-Country, a 1970 electronic album by Rick Powell
- Switched On Nashville (Country Moog), a 1972 electronic by Gil Trythall
- Switched-On Bach II, a 1973 electronic and baroque album by Wendy Carlos
- Switched-On Brandenburgs, a 1979 electronic and baroque album by Wendy Carlos
- Switched On, a 1992 post-rock compilation album by Stereolab
- Refried Ectoplasm (subtitled Switched On, Volume 2), a 1995 compilation album by Stereolab
- Aluminum Tunes (subtitled Switched On, Volume 3), a 1998 compilation album by Stereolab
- Electrically Possessed (subtitled Switched On, Volume 4), a 2021 compilation album by Stereolab
- Pulse of the Early Brain (subtitled Switched On, Volume 5), a 2022 compilation album by Stereolab
- Switched On, a 2011 electronic album by Mr. Chop
- Switched-On Eugene, a 2018 electronic album

=== EPs ===
- Switched On (EP), a 2014 EP by Madchild
- Switched on Christmas, a 2000 Christmas EP by Venus Hum

=== Songs ===
- "Switched On", a song by the Beastie Boys from Hello Nasty
- "Switched On", a song by Vaux from There Must Be Some Way to Stop Them

== Books ==
- Switched On (book), a 2016 book by John Elder Robison
