= Switched-On Brandenburgs =

Studio album by Wendy Carlos
- Released: 1980
- Recorded: 1968–1980
- Genres: Electronic; baroque
- Length: 122:34
- Label: Columbia
- Producer: Rachel Elkind

Wendy Carlos chronology
By Request (1975)	Switched-On Brandenburgs (1980)	The Shining Score Selections (1980)

Professional ratings
Review scores
Source	Rating
AllMusic	3/5 stars
The Rolling Stone Album Guide	3/5 stars

Switched-On Brandenburgs is a 1980 double album by Wendy Carlos. It was the seventh album released by Carlos, and the fourth album in her project of classical music which also included Switched-On Bach (1968), The Well-Tempered Synthesizer (1969), and Switched-On Bach II (1974). It was the first album she released under the name of Wendy Carlos rather than Walter Carlos.

Switched-On Brandenburgs is a collection of all six of Bach's Brandenburg Concertos performed by Carlos on her Moog modular synthesizer. Concerti #1, (most of) #2, and #6 were recorded specifically for the album. Concerti #3, #4, and #5 had been previously released on Switched-On Bach, The Well-Tempered Synthesizer, and Switched-On Bach II respectively (though the second movement of #3 was re-recorded for this release). The first movement of the Second Concerto had been recorded for the album By Request, released in 1975, however an updated mix is on this album.

== Track listing ==
The album was issued as a double LP when it was first released in 1980. Eight years later it was reissued as a pair of CDs.

=== Original LP format track order ===
- Side 1:
1. "Brandenburg Concerto # 1 in F Major: Allegro"
2. "Brandenburg Concerto # 1 in F Major: Adagio"
3. "Brandenburg Concerto # 1 in F Major: Allegro"
4. "Brandenburg Concerto # 1 in F Major: Menuet/Trio I/Polacca/Trio II"
- Side 2:
1. "Brandenburg Concerto # 3 in G Major: Allegro"
2. "Brandenburg Concerto # 3 in G Major: Adagio" (see note)
3. "Brandenburg Concerto # 3 in G Major: Allegro"
4. "Brandenburg Concerto # 4 in G Major: Allegro"
5. "Brandenburg Concerto # 4 in G Major: Andante"
6. "Brandenburg Concerto # 4 in G Major: Presto"
- Side 3:
1. "Brandenburg Concerto # 5 in D Major: Allegro"
2. "Brandenburg Concerto # 5 in D Major: Affettuoso"
3. "Brandenburg Concerto # 5 in D Major: Allegro"
- Side 4:
1. "Brandenburg Concerto # 2 in F Major: Allegro"
2. "Brandenburg Concerto # 2 in F Major: Andante"
3. "Brandenburg Concerto # 2 in F Major: Allegro Assai"
4. "Brandenburg Concerto # 6 in B-Flat Major: Allegro"
5. "Brandenburg Concerto # 6 in B-Flat Major: Adagio Ma Non Tanto"
6. "Brandenburg Concerto # 6 in B-Flat Major: Allegro"

=== CD format track order ===
The CD release placed the concerti in numerical order.

==== Disc one ====
1. "Brandenburg Concerto # 1 in F Major: Allegro"
2. "Brandenburg Concerto # 1 in F Major: Adagio"
3. "Brandenburg Concerto # 1 in F Major: Allegro"
4. "Brandenburg Concerto # 1 in F Major: Menuet/Trio I/Polacca/Trio II"
5. "Brandenburg Concerto # 2 in F Major: Allegro"
6. "Brandenburg Concerto # 2 in F Major: Andante"
7. "Brandenburg Concerto # 2 in F Major: Allegro Assai"
8. "Brandenburg Concerto # 3 in G Major: Allegro"
9. "Brandenburg Concerto # 3 in G Major: Adagio" (see note)
10. "Brandenburg Concerto # 3 in G Major: Allegro"

==== Disc two ====
1. "Brandenburg Concerto # 4 in G Major: Allegro"
2. "Brandenburg Concerto # 4 in G Major: Andante"
3. "Brandenburg Concerto # 4 in G Major: Presto"
4. "Brandenburg Concerto # 5 in D Major: Allegro"
5. "Brandenburg Concerto # 5 in D Major: Affettuoso"
6. "Brandenburg Concerto # 5 in D Major: Allegro"
7. "Brandenburg Concerto # 6 in B-Flat Major: Allegro"
8. "Brandenburg Concerto # 6 in B-Flat Major: Adagio Ma Non Tanto"
9. "Brandenburg Concerto # 6 in B-Flat Major: Allegro"

== Notes ==
- The Adagio of Brandenburg Concerto No. 3 is Carlos' own composition. J.S. Bach provided only a Phrygian cadence consisting of two chords (A minor and B) between the two movements in G major. The version on this album was composed and recorded in 1979 and differs from the 1968 track used for Switched-On Bach.
