= John Barbirolli =

British conductor and cellist (1899–1970)

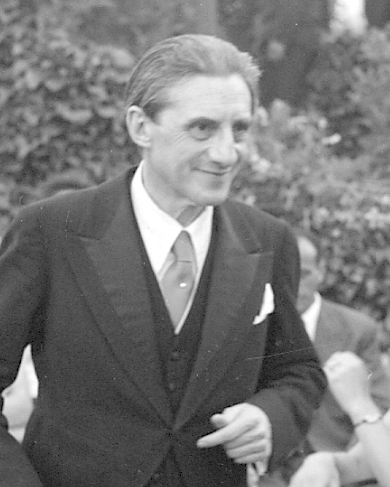
Barbirolli in 1960

Sir John Barbirolli (né Giovanni Battista Barbirolli; 2 December 1899 – 29 July 1970) was a British conductor and cellist. He is remembered above all as conductor of the Hallé Orchestra in Manchester, which he helped save from dissolution in 1943 and conducted for the rest of his life. Earlier in his career he was Arturo Toscanini's successor as music director of the New York Philharmonic, serving from 1936 to 1943. He was also chief conductor of the Houston Symphony from 1961 to 1967, and was a guest conductor of many other orchestras, including the BBC Symphony Orchestra, London Symphony Orchestra, the Philharmonia, the Berlin Philharmonic and the Vienna Philharmonic, with all of which he made recordings.

Born in London of Italian and French parentage, Barbirolli grew up in a family of professional musicians. After starting out as a cellist, he was given the chance to conduct, from 1926 with the British National Opera Company, and then with Covent Garden's touring company. On taking up the conductorship of the Hallé he had less opportunity to work in the opera house, but in the 1950s he conducted productions of works by Verdi, Wagner, Gluck, and Puccini at Covent Garden with such success that he was invited to become the company's permanent musical director, an invitation he declined. Late in his career he made several recordings of operas, of which his 1967 set of Puccini's Madama Butterfly for EMI is probably the best known.

Both in the concert hall and on record, Barbirolli was particularly associated with the music of English composers such as Elgar, Delius and Vaughan Williams. His interpretations of other late Romantic composers, such as Mahler and Sibelius, as well as of earlier classical composers, including Schubert, are also still admired.

== Biography ==
=== Early years ===
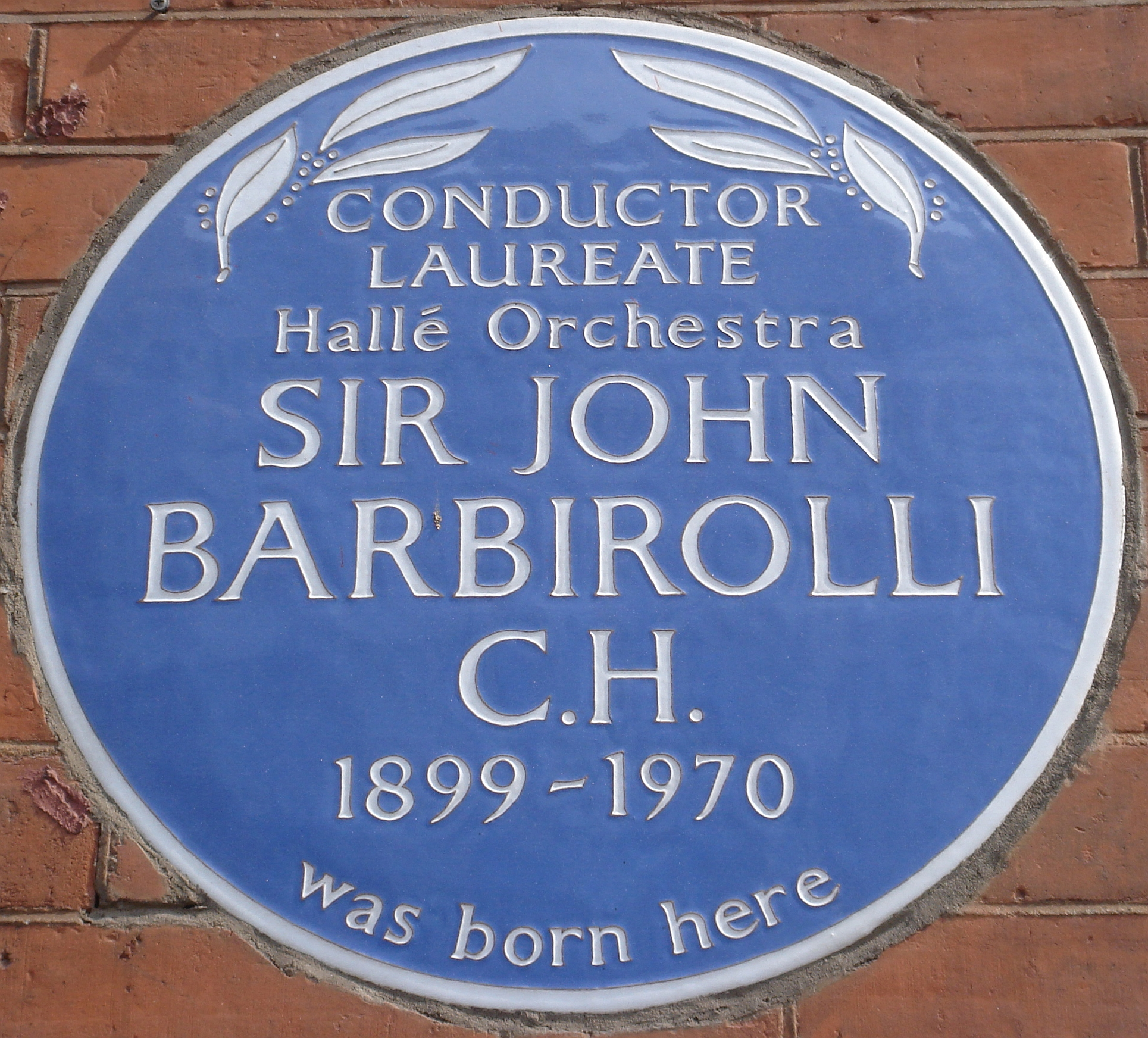
Southampton Row blue plaque

Giovanni Battista Barbirolli was born on 2 December 1899 in Southampton Row, Holborn, London, the second child and eldest son of an Italian father and a French mother. He was a British national from birth, and as Southampton Row is within the sound of Bow Bells, Barbirolli always regarded himself as a Cockney. His father, Lorenzo Barbirolli (1864–1929), was a Venetian violinist who had settled in London with his wife, Louise Marie, née Ribeyrol (1870–1962). Lorenzo and his father had played in the orchestra at La Scala, Milan, where they had taken part in the première of Otello in 1887. In London they played in West End theatre orchestras, principally that of the Empire, Leicester Square.

The young Barbirolli began to play the violin when he was four, but soon changed to the cello. He later said that this was at the instigation of his grandfather who, exasperated at the child's habit of wandering around while practising the violin, bought him a small cello to stop him from "getting in everybody's way". (Note: In adult life, Barbirolli, when he needed to play the violin to show how he wanted a passage to be phrased, would hold the violin upright on his lap like a miniature cello.) His education at St Clement Danes Grammar School overlapped, from 1910, with a scholarship at Trinity College of Music. As a Trinity student, he made his concert debut in a cello concerto in the Queen's Hall in 1911.

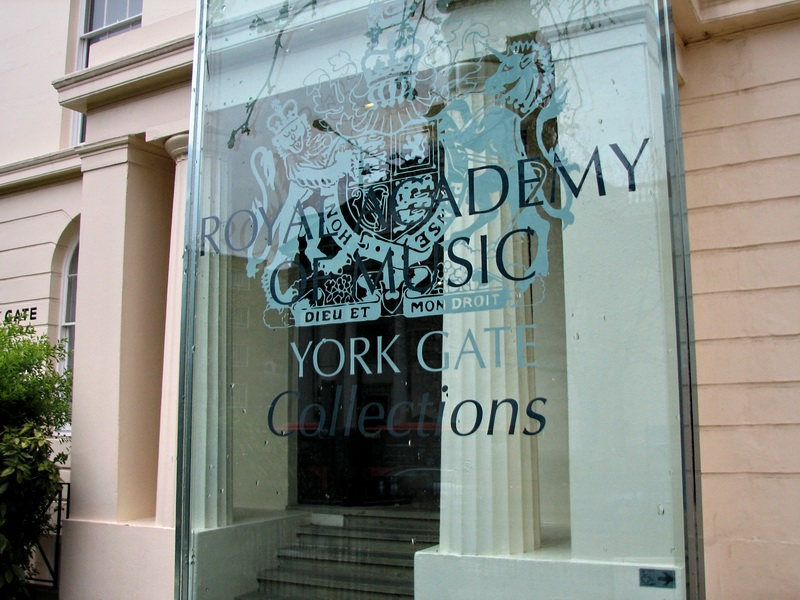
Royal Academy of Music, London

The following year he won the Ada Lewis Scholarship to study at the Royal Academy of Music, which he attended from 1912 to 1916, studying harmony, counterpoint and theory under J. B. McEwen and the cello with Herbert Walenn. In 1914 he was joint winner of the academy's Charles Rube Prize for ensemble playing, and in 1916 The Musical Times singled him out as "that excellent young 'cello player, Mr Giovanni Barbirolli." The principal of the academy, Sir Alexander Mackenzie, had forbidden students to play the chamber music of Ravel, which he regarded as "a pernicious influence". Barbirolli was keenly interested in modern music, and he and three colleagues secretly rehearsed Ravel's String Quartet in the privacy of a men's lavatory in the academy.

From 1916 to 1918 Barbirolli was a freelance cellist in London. He recalled, "My first orchestral engagement was with the Queen's Hall Orchestra – I was probably the youngest orchestral musician ever, joining them in 1916. We had an enormous repertory – six concerts a week, three hours or more rehearsal a day. In those days we were happy if we began and finished together". While playing in the Queen's Hall Orchestra, Barbirolli also played in the opera pit for the Beecham and Carl Rosa opera companies, in recitals with the pianist Ethel Bartlett, with orchestras in theatres, cinemas, hotels and dance-halls, and, as he said, "everywhere except the street". During the last year of the First World War, Barbirolli enlisted in the army and became a lance-corporal in the Suffolk Regiment. Here he had his first opportunity to conduct, when an orchestra of volunteers was formed. He later described the experience:

I was stationed on the Isle of Grain – a ghastly place but the first line of defence against invasion – and in our battalion of the Suffolks we had a number of professional musicians. So we formed an orchestra and played in the equivalent of the NAAFI during our spare time. I was the principal cello and we were conducted by the bandmaster, one Lieutenant Bonham. The other boys knew that I was longing to conduct and one day when Bonham fell ill with 'flu, they thought "old Barby" – as I was known – should have a go. It was really rather romantic – I was scrubbing the floor in the Officers' Mess when they came and invited me to take over. We did the Light Cavalry overture and Coleridge-Taylor's Petite Suite de Concert but I can't say I recall the rest of the programme.

While in the army, Barbirolli adopted the anglicised form of his first name for the sake of simplicity: "The sergeant-major had great difficulty in reading my name on the roll-call. 'Who is this Guy Vanni?' he used to ask. So I chose John." After demobilisation he reverted to the original form of his name, using it until 1922.

On re-entering civilian life, Barbirolli resumed his career as a cellist. His association with Edward Elgar's Cello Concerto began with its première in 1919, when he played as a rank and file member of the London Symphony Orchestra. He was the soloist at another performance of the concerto just over a year later. (Note: Some sources state that Barbirolli gave the second performance of the concerto, but the original soloist, Felix Salmond, gave the work its second performance, with the Hallé in Manchester on 20 March 1920, and Beatrice Harrison also played the solo part before Barbirolli did: see Kennedy (1971), p. 40.) The Musical Times commented, "Signor Giovanni Barbirolli was not entirely equal to the demands of the solo music, but his playing unquestionably gave a considerable amount of pleasure." At the Three Choirs Festival of 1920 he took part in his first Dream of Gerontius, under Elgar's baton, in the LSO cellos. He joined two newly founded string quartets as cellist: the Kutcher Quartet, led by his former fellow student at Trinity, Samuel Kutcher, and the Music Society Quartet (later called the International Quartet) led by André Mangeot. He also made several early broadcasts with Mangeot's quartet.

=== First conducting posts ===
Barbirolli's ambition was to conduct. He was the prime mover in establishing the Guild of Singers and Players Chamber Orchestra in 1924, and in 1926 he was invited to conduct a new ensemble at the Chenil Gallery in Chelsea, initially called the "Chenil Chamber Orchestra" but later renamed "John Barbirolli's Chamber Orchestra". Barbirolli's concerts impressed Frederic Austin, director of the British National Opera Company (BNOC), who in the same year invited him to conduct some performances with the company. Barbirolli had never conducted a chorus or a large orchestra, but had the confidence to accept. He made his operatic debut directing Gounod's Roméo et Juliette at Newcastle, followed within days by performances of Aida and Madama Butterfly. He conducted the BNOC frequently over the next two years, and made his debut at the Royal Opera House, Covent Garden, with Madama Butterfly in 1928. The following year he was invited to conduct the opening work in Covent Garden's international season, Don Giovanni, with a cast that included Mariano Stabile, Elisabeth Schumann and Heddle Nash.

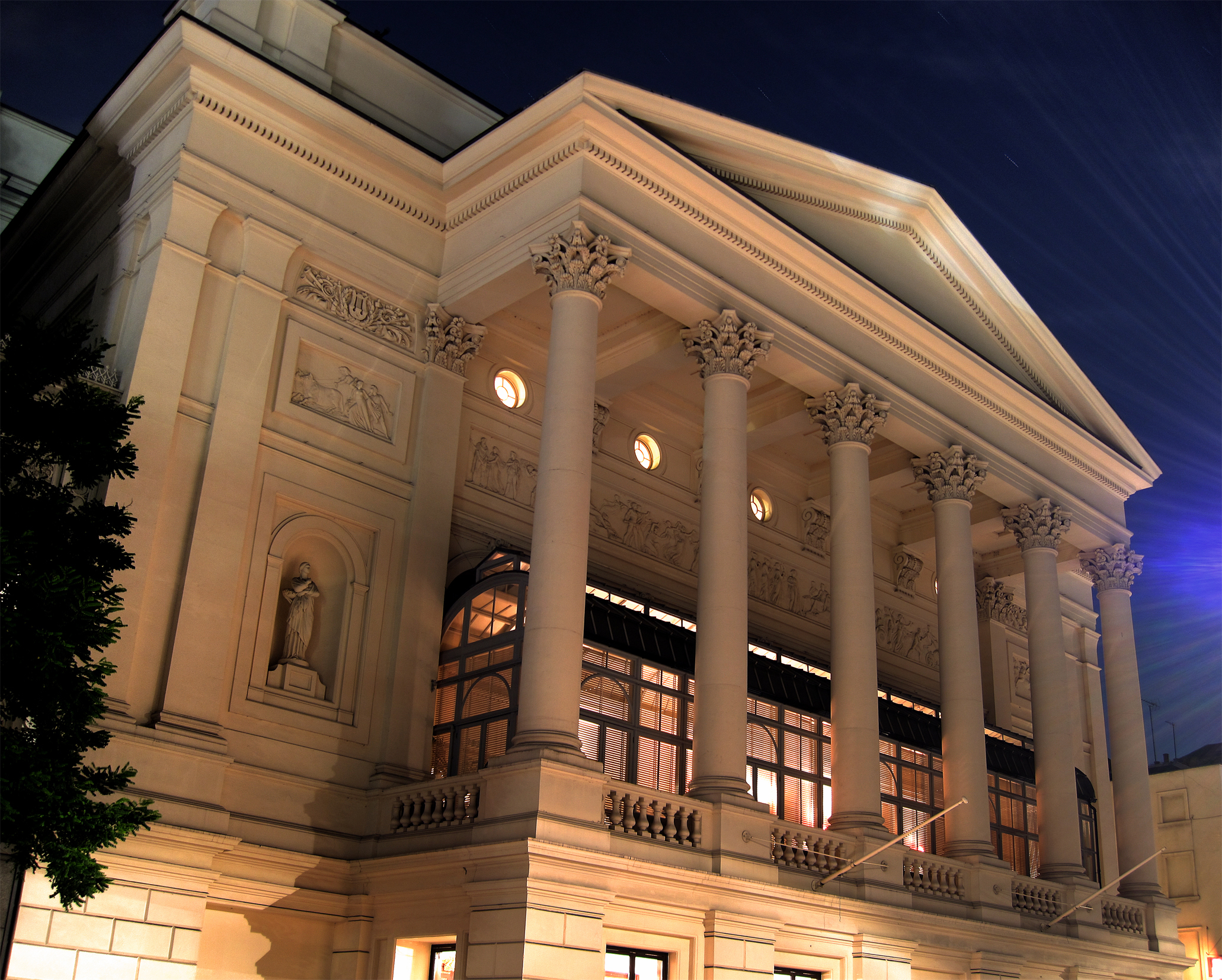
Royal Opera House, Covent Garden

In 1929, after financial problems had forced the BNOC to disband, the Covent Garden management set up a touring company to fill the gap, and appointed Barbirolli as its musical director and conductor. The operas in the company's first provincial tour included Die Meistersinger, Lohengrin, La bohème, Madama Butterfly, The Barber of Seville, Tosca, Falstaff, Faust, Cavalleria rusticana, Pagliacci, Il trovatore, and the first performances in English of Turandot. In later tours with the company Barbirolli had the chance to conduct more of the German opera repertory, including Der Rosenkavalier, Tristan und Isolde, and Die Walküre. During his years with the touring opera companies Barbirolli did not neglect the concert hall. In 1927, deputising at short notice for Sir Thomas Beecham, he conducted the London Symphony Orchestra in a performance of Elgar's Symphony No. 2, winning the thanks of the composer. Barbirolli also won warm praise from Pablo Casals, whom he had accompanied in Haydn's D major cello concerto at the same concert. (Note: The critic of The Times did not share Elgar's and Casals's enthusiasm, criticising "Mr. Barbirolli's excessively jerky manner ... a lack of flow in the playing ... disastrous in Elgar's symphony.") He conducted a Royal Philharmonic Society concert at which Ralph Vaughan Williams was presented with the society's Gold Medal, and another RPS concert at which Gustav Mahler's music, rarely heard at that time, was given – Kindertotenlieder, with Elena Gerhardt as soloist. Although Barbirolli later came to love Mahler's music, in the 1930s he thought it sounded thin.

When the Hallé Orchestra announced in 1932 that its regular conductor, Hamilton Harty, was to spend some time conducting overseas, Barbirolli was one of four guest conductors named to direct the orchestra in Harty's absence: the other three were Elgar, Beecham and Pierre Monteux. Barbirolli's programmes included works by composers as diverse as Purcell, Delius, Mozart and Franck. In June 1932, Barbirolli married the singer Marjorie Parry, a member of the BNOC. In 1933 he was invited to become conductor of the Scottish Orchestra. It was not then, as its successor the Scottish National Orchestra was later to be, a permanent ensemble, but gave a season lasting about six months of each year. Barbirolli remained with the Scottish Orchestra for three seasons, "rejuvenating the playing and programmes and winning most favourable opinions". Notwithstanding his growing reputation in Britain, Barbirolli's name was little known internationally, and most of the musical world was taken by surprise in 1936 when he was invited to conduct the New York Philharmonic Orchestra in succession to Arturo Toscanini. (Note: Barbirolli's biographer Charles Reid writes, "Barbirolli's appointment was announced by the New York Philharmonic Society's directorial board on 7 April 1936. The musical world rubbed incredulous eyes. ... In much newspaper comment the following day surprise verged on perplexity. Nobody had heard of John Barbirolli. ... What sense was there in giving the New York Philharmonic to a man who had never been on an American front page before or, so far as could be made out, on any front page of moment anywhere?")

=== New York Philharmonic ===
By the spring of 1936, the management of the New York Philharmonic was confronted with a problem. Toscanini had left in search of higher fees with the NBC Symphony Orchestra. (Note: NBC paid Toscanini $3,334 a concert, compared with his fee of $1,833 a concert with the Philharmonic. Barbirolli's fee with the Philharmonic was $312 a concert.) Wilhelm Furtwängler had accepted the orchestra's invitation to fill the post, but he was politically unacceptable to a section of the philharmonic's audience because he continued to live and work in Germany under the Nazi government. Following a campaign of protest in New York he felt unable to take up the appointment. For want of any available conductor of comparable fame the management of the orchestra invited five guest conductors to divide the season among them. Barbirolli was allotted the first ten weeks of the season, comprising 26 concerts. He was followed by the composer-conductors Igor Stravinsky, Georges Enescu and Carlos Chávez, each conducting for two weeks, and finally by Artur Rodziński of the Cleveland Orchestra, for eight weeks.

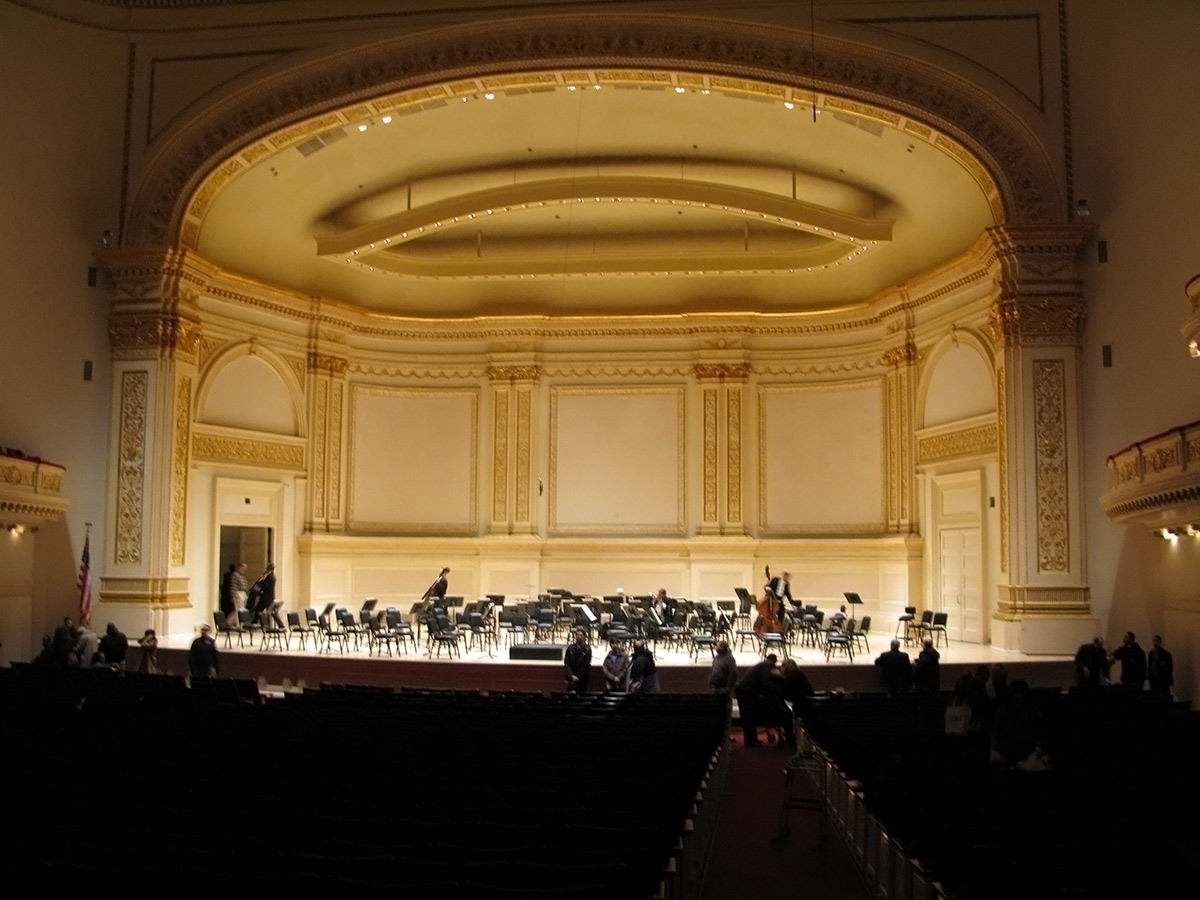
Carnegie Hall, New York, where Barbirolli conducted from 1936 to 1943 External audio: You may listen to John Barbirolli conducting his orchestral transcription of Johann Sebastian Bach's Sheep May Safely Graze from his Cantata Was mir behagt, ist nur die muntre Jagd, BWV 208 with the New York Philharmonic in 1940 here on archive.org

Barbirolli's first concert in New York was on 5 November 1936. The programme consisted of short pieces by Berlioz and Arnold Bax, and symphonies by Mozart (the Linz) and Brahms (the Fourth). During his ten weeks, he programmed several American novelties including Charles Martin Loeffler's tone-poem Memories of My Childhood, a symphony by Anis Fuleihan, and Philip James's Bret Harte overture. He also conducted Serge Koussevitzky's Double Bass Concerto. The players told the philharmonic management that they would be happy for Barbirolli to be appointed to a permanent position. The outcome of this was an invitation to him to become music director and permanent conductor for three years starting with the 1937–38 season. At the same time as this great change in his professional life, Barbirolli's personal life was also transformed. His marriage had not lasted; within four years he and Marjorie Barbirolli had been living apart. In 1938 she sued for divorce on the grounds of his desertion. The suit was undefended, and the divorce was granted in December 1938. In 1939, Barbirolli married the British oboist Evelyn Rothwell. The marriage lasted for the rest of Barbirolli's life. (Note: There were no children of either of Barbirolli's marriages.)

One of the features of Barbirolli's time in New York was his regular programming of modern works. He gave the world premières of Walton's second Façade Suite, and Britten's Sinfonia da Requiem and Violin Concerto; he also introduced pieces by Jacques Ibert, Eugene Goossens, and Arthur Bliss and by many American composers including Samuel Barber, Deems Taylor and Daniel Gregory Mason. The new works he presented were not avant-garde, but they nevertheless alienated the conservative subscription audience, and after an initial increase in ticket sales in his early years sales declined. Barbirolli also had to cope with what The Gramophone described as "a rough press campaign in New York from interested parties who wished to evict him from his post". The influential critic Olin Downes had opposed Barbirolli's appointment from the outset, insisting that, though "we abhor chauvinism", preference should have been given to "native conductors". Downes had a grudge against the philharmonic: shortly before Barbirolli's appointment Downes was sacked as the commentator for the orchestra's prestigious Sunday broadcasts. He and the composer Virgil Thomson continually wrote disparagingly about Barbirolli, comparing him unfavourably with Toscanini. The management of the orchestra nevertheless renewed Barbirolli's appointment in 1940. In 1942, when his second contract was reaching its expiry, he was offered 18 concerts for the 1943–44 season, and the Los Angeles Philharmonic invited him to become its conductor, but he accepted neither offer as he had decided to return to England.

Barbirolli's first reason for leaving was local musical politics. He later said, "The Musicians Union there ... brought out a new regulation saying that everyone, even soloists and conductors, must become members. Horowitz, Heifetz and the rest were shocked by this but there was little they could do about it. They also said that conductors must become American citizens. I couldn't do that during the war, or at any time for that matter." His second reason for leaving was that he felt strongly that he was needed in England. In the spring of 1942 he made a hazardous Atlantic crossing:

I was in America when the war broke out, as conductor of the New York Philharmonic. A. V. Alexander, who was First Sea Lord, (Note: Alexander was in fact First Lord of the Admiralty – the government minister responsible for the Royal Navy – rather than First Sea Lord, who is the senior serving officer of the navy.) wrote to me to say that, contrary to expectations, music was flourishing and would I come back as I was missed. I was longing to return and it was just a question of how it was to be managed. A.V. went to Churchill, who apparently said, "If he's fool enough to come, let him come". It took us 23 days to cross on a fruit trader and, of our convoy of 75, only 32 ships arrived in Liverpool. I played here for ten weeks with the LSO and LPO for the benefit of the musicians, and then went back on a Fyffe banana boat of 5,000 tons. We were spotted by U-boats the moment we left Northern Ireland but that kind of thing never worries me as I'm something of a fatalist. It had been wonderful anyhow to be back, to see England at its greatest, and to visit my old mother.

Barbirolli returned to New York to complete his contractual obligations to the philharmonic. (Note: Barbirolli's last concert as conductor of the New York Philharmonic was on 7 March 1943. He did not conduct the orchestra again until he appeared as guest conductor in 1959, after which he conducted a further 27 concerts, the last of which was on 4 April 1968.) Shortly after his return he received an appeal from the Hallé Orchestra to become its conductor. The orchestra was in danger of extinction for lack of players, and Barbirolli seized the opportunity to help it.

=== Hallé Orchestra ===
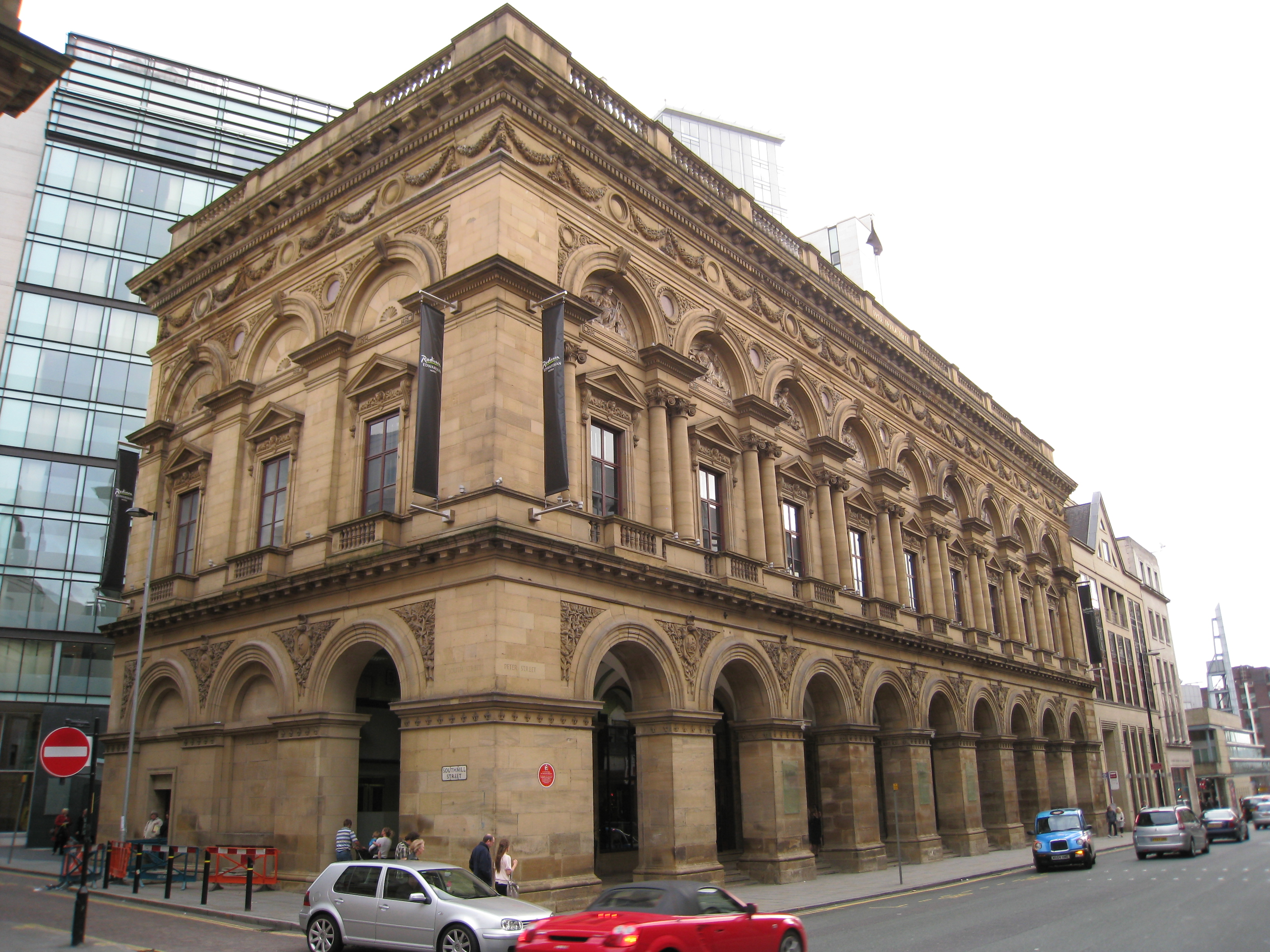
Free Trade Hall, Manchester, the Hallé's main base in the Barbirolli years

Barbirolli conducting (1959)

In 1943 Barbirolli made another Atlantic crossing, avoiding death by a fluke: he changed flights from Lisbon with the actor Leslie Howard when the latter wished to postpone his own flight for a few days. Barbirolli's plane landed safely; Howard's was shot down. In Manchester, Barbirolli immediately set about reviving the Hallé. The number of players in the orchestra was down to about 30. Most younger players were serving in the armed forces, and to compound the shortage the management of the orchestra had ended the arrangement by which many of its players were also members of the BBC Northern Orchestra. The Hallé board resolved that its orchestra must follow the example of the Liverpool Philharmonic, which the Hallé's former conductor Malcolm Sargent had transformed into a full-time, permanent orchestra. Only four of the players shared with the BBC chose to join the Hallé.

The Times later wrote of Barbirolli's first actions for the orchestra: "In a couple of months of endless auditions, he rebuilt the Hallé, accepting any good player, whatever his musical background – he found himself with a schoolboy first flute, a schoolmistress hornist, and various brass players recruited from brass and military bands in the Manchester area ... The reborn Hallé's first concert somehow lived up to the Hallé's great reputation." The Musical Times also noted, "From his earliest days with the orchestra it was the string tone that commanded immediate attention and respect. There was a fiery intensity and glowing warmth that proclaimed the born string coach". Barbirolli retained his reputation for training orchestras: after his death, one of his former players commented, "If you wanted orchestral experience you'd be set for life, starting in the Hallé with John Barbirolli." Further afield, critics, audiences and players in Europe and the United States commented on the improvement in the playing of their orchestras when Barbirolli was in charge. Later he extended his teaching skills to the Royal Academy of Music, where he took charge of the student orchestra from 1961.

Barbirolli refused invitations to take up more prestigious and lucrative conductorships. Shortly after he took over the Hallé he received an offer from the sponsors of an ambitious scheme that would have put him in charge of the London Symphony Orchestra, and in the early 1950s the BBC sought to recruit him for the BBC Symphony Orchestra. Also in the early 1950s the head of the Royal Opera House, David Webster, wanted him to become the musical director there. Barbirolli conducted six operas for Webster, Turandot, Aida, Orfeo ed Euridice, Tristan und Isolde, La bohème and Madama Butterfly, 1951–53, but he declined to be wooed away from the Hallé. His biographer Charles Reid wrote, "His Manchester kingdom is a kingdom indeed. He is not manacled or chivied in his choice of programmes. Broadly speaking he conducts only what he loves ... His kingdom approximates to a conductor's paradise." Nevertheless, in 1958, after building the orchestra up and touring continually, conducting up to 75 concerts a year, he arranged a less onerous schedule, allowing him more time to appear as a guest conductor with other orchestras. He also appeared at the Vienna State Opera, and Rome Opera House, where he conducted Aida in 1969. In 1960 he accepted an invitation to succeed Leopold Stokowski as chief conductor of the Houston Symphony in Texas, a post he held until 1967, conducting an annual total of 12 weeks there in early spring and late autumn between Hallé engagements. In 1961 he began a regular association with the Berlin Philharmonic Orchestra, which lasted for the rest of his life.

The Hallé's first programme (1858) replicated by Barbirolli and the orchestra a hundred years later

From 1953 onwards, Barbirolli and the Hallé appeared regularly at the Henry Wood Promenade Concerts at the Royal Albert Hall in London. As well as major works from the mainstream repertory they gave an annual concert of music by Viennese composers, including Franz Lehár and Johann Strauss, which, like Sir Malcolm Sargent's annual Gilbert and Sullivan nights, rapidly became a firm favourite with the promenaders. At one 1958 promenade concert Barbirolli and the Hallé played a replica of Charles Hallé's first concert with the orchestra in 1858.

Barbirolli's interest in new music waned in post-war years, but he and the Hallé appeared regularly at the Cheltenham Festival, where he premiered new works of a mostly traditional style by William Alwyn, Richard Arnell, Arthur Benjamin, Peter Racine Fricker, Gordon Jacob, Alan Rawsthorne, Kenneth Leighton and others. For its hundredth anniversary in 1958 the Hallé commissioned several new works, and gave the British premiere of Walton's virtuosic divertimento Partita. Increasingly, Barbirolli concentrated on his core repertory of the standard symphonic classics, the works of English composers, and late-romantic music, particularly that of Mahler. In the 1960s he made a series of international tours with the Philharmonia (Latin America, 1963), BBC Symphony Orchestra (Czechoslovakia, Poland and the USSR, 1967) and the Hallé (Latin America and West Indies, 1968). It was a lasting disappointment to him that it never proved possible to take the Hallé on a tour of the United States.

In 1968, after 25 years with the Hallé, Barbirolli retired from the principal conductorship; no successor was appointed in his lifetime. (Note: His successor, James Loughran, was not named until five months after Barbirolli's death.) He was appointed the orchestra's conductor laureate. He reduced the number of his appearances with the Hallé, but nevertheless took it on another European tour in 1968, this time to Switzerland, Austria and Germany. In his last years a propensity to concentrate on detail at the expense of the whole of a piece became marked. His loyal friend and admirer the critic Neville Cardus wrote privately in 1969, "he seems so much to love a single phrase that he lingers over it, caressing it; meanwhile the general momentum is lost." His final year, 1970, was dogged by heart trouble; he suffered collapses in April, May, June and July. His last two concerts were with the Hallé at the 1970 King's Lynn Festival. He produced "inspired" renderings of Elgar's Symphony No. 1 and Sea Pictures. The last work he conducted in public was Beethoven's Symphony No. 7 on the Saturday before his death. On the day he died, 29 July 1970, he spent several hours rehearsing the New Philharmonia Orchestra for a forthcoming tour of Japan that he was scheduled to lead.

Barbirolli died at his London home of a heart attack, aged 70. Among planned engagements forestalled by his death were a production of Otello at the Royal Opera House, which would have been his first appearance there for nearly 20 years, and opera recordings for EMI, including Puccini's Manon Lescaut and Verdi's Falstaff.

== Honours, awards and memorials ==
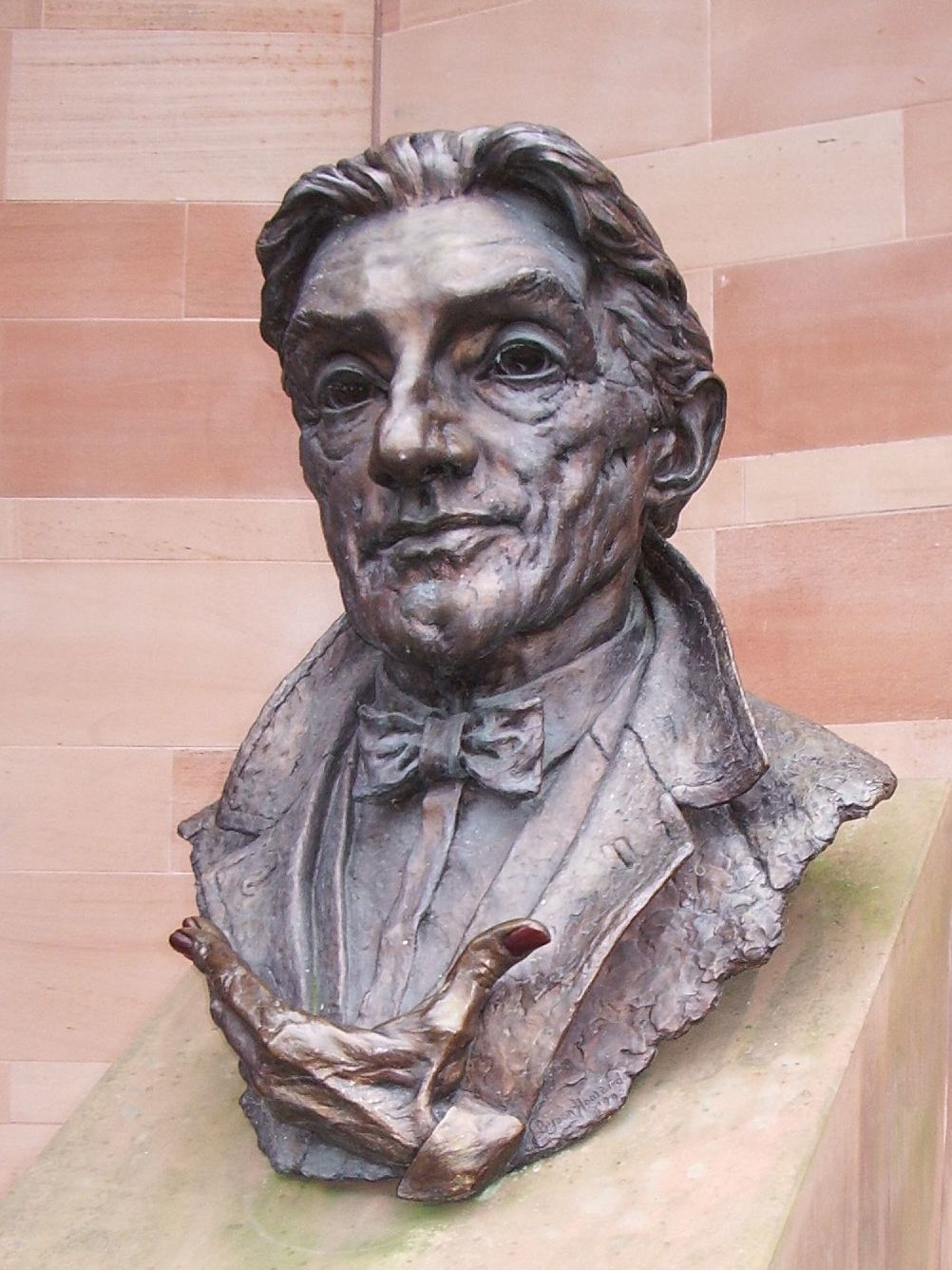
Bust of Barbirolli in Barbirolli Square

Among Barbirolli's state awards were a British knighthood in 1949 and appointment as a Member of the Order of the Companions of Honour in 1969; the Finnish Grand Star and Collar of Commander 1st Class of the Order of the White Rose in 1963; from Italy the Order of Merit in 1964; and from France, Officier de l'Ordre des Arts et des Lettres, 1966, and Officier de l'Ordre national du Mérite, 1968. Awards from musical institutions included the Freedom of the Worshipful Company of Musicians, 1966; Honorary Academician of the Accademia Nazionale di Santa Cecilia, 1960; Gold Medal of the Royal Philharmonic Society, 1950; Bruckner Medal, Bruckner Society of America, 1959; and the Mahler Medal, Mahler-Bruckner Society of America, 1965. He was also awarded the title of Doctor of Music honoris causa (DMus h.c.) from the National University of Ireland in 1952.

There are memorials to Barbirolli in Manchester and London. Barbirolli Square in Manchester is named in his honour and features a sculpture of him by Byron Howard (2000). The square includes the present base of the Hallé Orchestra, the Bridgewater Hall, in which the Barbirolli Room commemorates the conductor. At his old school, St Clement Danes, now relocated in Chorleywood, the main hall is named in his honour. A commemorative blue plaque was placed on the wall of the Bloomsbury Park Hotel in Southampton Row in May 1993 to mark Barbirolli's birthplace. The Sir John Barbirolli Memorial Foundation of the Royal Philharmonic Society was instituted after his death to assist young musicians with the purchase of instruments. In 1972 the Barbirolli Society was set up with the principal aim of promoting the continued release of Barbirolli's recorded performances. Its honorary officers have included Evelyn Barbirolli, Daniel Barenboim and Michael Kennedy. In April 2012, he was voted into the inaugural Gramophone "Hall of Fame".

== Repertoire and recordings ==
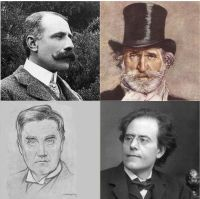
Elgar (top l.), Verdi, (top r.) Vaughan Williams (lower l.) and Mahler, whose music was central to Barbirolli's repertoire

Barbirolli is remembered as an interpreter of Elgar, Vaughan Williams and Mahler, as well as Schubert, Beethoven, Sibelius, Verdi and Puccini, and as a staunch supporter of new works by British composers. Vaughan Williams dedicated his Eighth Symphony to Barbirolli, whose nickname, "Glorious John", comes from the inscription Vaughan Williams wrote at the head of the score: "For glorious John, with love and admiration from Ralph." Barbirolli did not disdain lighter repertoire. The music critic Richard Osborne wrote that, if all Barbirolli's recordings were to be lost except that of Lehár's Gold and Silver Waltz, "there would be reason enough to say, 'Now, there was a conductor!'"

Barbirolli's repertoire was not as wide as that of many of his colleagues because he insisted on exhaustive preparation for any work he conducted. His colleague Sir Adrian Boult liked and admired Barbirolli but teased him for his meticulousness: "We can't all be like you and spend months studying these things and then have days of rehearsals before we conduct them. For some of us they're only sporting events." Barbirolli was shocked by such levity. (Note: Despite his musical single-mindedness, Barbirolli had a keen sense of humour, and was a noted raconteur. One of his anecdotes was of a 1920s touring performance of Aida in which the tenor's "Aida, where are thou now?" was answered by the sonorous flushing of a backstage lavatory: "I'm afraid the opera ended there, though we continued gallantly to the end.") His approach was illustrated by the care he took with Mahler's symphonies. His biographer Michael Kennedy commented, "it is ironical that the effort of composing the symphonies shortened Mahler's life; interpreting them certainly put an enormous strain on Barbirolli in his last decade." He found that mastering a Mahler symphony took between 18 months and two years, and he would spend hours meticulously bowing all the string parts in preparation for his performances. His first performance of Mahler's Ninth took nearly 50 hours of rehearsal.

=== Pre-war ===
From almost the start of his career Barbirolli was a frequent recording artist. As a young cellist he made four records for Edison Bell in 1911, with piano accompaniment by his sister Rosa, and as part of the Kutcher and the Music Society string quartets he recorded music by Mozart, Purcell, Vaughan Williams and others in 1925 and 1926. As a conductor he began recording in 1927 for the National Gramophonic Society (an offshoot of The Gramophone). Among his records from that period was the first to be made of Elgar's Introduction and Allegro for Strings. On hearing it, the composer said, "I'd never realised it was such a big work." Elgar, despite an extensive discography as a conductor, never recorded the work himself, and some have speculated that "the breadth, nobility and lyrical poetry" of Barbirolli's interpretation left the composer disinclined to compete. In 1928 Barbirolli made some recordings for the Edison Bell label. The same year, he began his long association with the His Master's Voice (HMV) label. Immediately after the LSO concert at which he had stood in for Beecham, he was approached by Fred Gaisberg, the chief recording producer for His Master's Voice who signed him for his company shortly afterwards. An HMV colleague of Gaisberg described Barbirolli as "a treasure", because he "could accompany Chaliapin without provoking an uproar, win golden opinions from Jascha Heifetz, Artur Rubinstein, Fritz Kreisler and Pablo Casals, and conduct one of the finest recorded performances of the Quintet from Meistersinger".

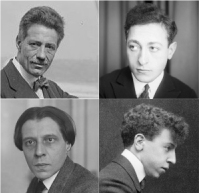
Fritz Kreisler (top l.), Jascha Heifetz (top r.), Alfred Cortot (lower l.) and Arthur Rubinstein, whom Barbirolli accompanied in his early His Master's Voice recordings

Many of Barbirolli's pre-war recordings for HMV were of concertos. His reputation as an accompanist tended to obscure his talents as a symphonic conductor, and later, his detractors in New York "damned him with faint praise by exalting his powers as an accompanist and then implying that that was where it all stopped." Barbirolli became very sensitive on this point, and for many years after the war he was reluctant to accompany anyone in the recording studio. Among his early His Master's Voice records are works, mainly concertos, by Brahms, Bruch, Chopin, Dvořák, Glazunov, Mendelssohn, Mozart, Schumann, Sibelius, Tchaikovsky and Vieuxtemps. From the 1990s onwards, archive recordings of Barbirolli's early concerts in New York have been issued on CD. Kennedy wrote in 2004 that they "prove that the orchestra played superbly for him and that the criticism of him was largely unjustified." Recordings from this period include symphonies by Beethoven, Mendelssohn, Mozart, Schubert, Schumann, Sibelius and Tchaikovsky, and other orchestral music by Berlioz, Debussy, Menotti, Purcell, Ravel, Respighi, and Rimsky-Korsakov.

=== 1943 and later ===
Within six months of his return to Britain in 1943, Barbirolli resumed his contract with HMV, conducting the Hallé in the Third Symphony of Bax and the Fifth of Vaughan Williams, followed by works by a wide range of composers from Corelli to Stravinsky. In 1955 he signed a contract with Pye Records, with whom he and the Hallé recorded a wide repertoire, and made their first stereophonic recordings. These records were distributed in the US by Vanguard Records. A company was formed, named Pye-Barbirolli, of which he was a director: the arrangement was designed to ensure an equal partnership between the company and the musicians. They made many recordings, including symphonies by Beethoven, Dvořák, Elgar, Mozart, Nielsen, Sibelius, Mahler, Tchaikovsky and Vaughan Williams, as well as a few concertos, short orchestral pieces and operatic excerpts.

In 1962, HMV persuaded Barbirolli to return. With the Hallé he recorded a Sibelius symphony cycle, Elgar's Second Symphony, Falstaff and The Dream of Gerontius, Schubert's Ninth Symphony, Vaughan Williams's A London Symphony, and works by Grieg and Delius. With other orchestras, Barbirolli recorded a wide range of his repertoire, including many recordings still in the catalogues in 2025. Of these, his Elgar recordings include the Cello Concerto with Jacqueline du Pré, Sea Pictures with Janet Baker, and orchestral music including the First Symphony, Enigma Variations and many of the shorter works. His Mahler recordings include the Fifth and Sixth Symphonies (with the New Philharmonia) and Ninth Symphony (with the Berlin Philharmonic). With the Vienna Philharmonic, he recorded a Brahms symphony cycle, and with Daniel Barenboim, the two Brahms Piano Concertos. He made three operatic sets for HMV: Purcell's Dido and Aeneas with Victoria de los Ángeles (1966), Verdi's Otello with James McCracken, Gwyneth Jones and Dietrich Fischer-Dieskau (1969), and a set of Madama Butterfly with Renata Scotto, Carlo Bergonzi and Rome Opera forces that has remained in the catalogues since its first issue in 1967. The impact of the last was such that the head of the Rome Opera invited him to come and conduct "any opera you care to name with as much rehearsal as you wish." HMV planned to record Die Meistersinger with Barbirolli in Dresden in 1970, but following the Warsaw Pact invasion of Czechoslovakia in 1968 he refused to conduct in the Soviet bloc, and his place was taken by Herbert von Karajan.

== Notes and references ==
Notes

== Sources ==
- Ayre, Leslie (1966). The Wit of Music: Introduction by Sir John Barbirolli. London: Leslie Frewin. OCLC 857354.
- Brookes, Christopher (1985). His Own Man: The Life of Neville Cardus. London: Methuen. ISBN 0-413-50940-0.
- Cox, David (1980). The Henry Wood Proms. London: British Broadcasting Corporation. ISBN 0-563-17697-0.
- Haltrecht, Montague (1975). The Quiet Showman: Sir David Webster and the Royal Opera House. London: Collins. ISBN 0-00-211163-2.
- Horowitz, Joseph (1997). Understanding Toscanini. Berkeley: University of California Press. ISBN 0-520-08542-6.
- Kennedy, Michael (1987). Adrian Boult. London: Papermac. ISBN 0-333-48752-4.
- Kennedy, Michael (1971). Barbirolli, Conductor Laureate: The Authorised Biography. London: MacGibbon and Key. ISBN 0-261-63336-8.
- Kennedy, Michael (1982). The Hallé, 1858–1983: A History of the Orchestra. London: Macmillan. ISBN 0-7190-0921-9.
- Kennedy, Michael (1989). William Walton. Oxford: Oxford University Press. ISBN 0-19-315418-8.
- Lindsay, Maurice (1951). "Northern Diary". In Ralph Hill (ed.). Music 1951. Harmondsworth: Penguin Books. OCLC 26147349.
- Osborne, Richard (1998). Herbert von Karajan: A Life in Music. London: Chatto and Windus. ISBN 1-85619-763-8.
- Previn, André (1979). Orchestra. London: Macdonald and Jane's. ISBN 0-354-04420-6.
- Reid, Charles (1957). "John Barbirolli". In Milein Cosman (ed.). Musical Sketchbook. Oxford: Bruno Cassirer. OCLC 3225493.
- Reid, Charles (1971). John Barbirolli – A Biography. London: Hamish Hamilton. ISBN 0-241-01819-6.
- Reid, Charles (1968). Malcolm Sargent. London: Hamish Hamilton. OCLC 500687986.
- Rennison, Nick (2003). The London Blue Plaque Guide. Stroud: Sutton Publishing. ISBN 0-7509-3388-7.
- Rigby, Charles (1948). John Barbirolli. Altrincham: John Sherratt and Son. OCLC 500687986.
- Rothwell, Evelyn (2002). Life with Glorious John. London: Robson Books. ISBN 1-86105-474-2.
