= The Well-Tempered Synthesizer =

- Reissue front cover

Studio album by Wendy Carlos
- Released: November 1969
- Recorded: 1969
- Genres: Electronic; classical; baroque
- Length: 37:58
- Label: Columbia Masterworks Records
- Producer: Rachel Elkind

Wendy Carlos chronology
Switched-On Bach (1968)	The Well-Tempered Synthesizer (1969)	Sonic Seasonings (1972)

Professional ratings
Review scores
Source	Rating
AllMusic	5/5 stars
Rolling Stone	(Positive)

The Well-Tempered Synthesizer is the second studio album from the American musician and composer Wendy Carlos, released in November 1969 by Columbia Masterworks Records. Following the success of her previous album, Switched-On Bach (1968), Carlos proceeded to record a second album of classical music performed on a modular Moog synthesizer from multiple composers, including Johann Sebastian Bach, Claudio Monteverdi, Domenico Scarlatti, and George Frideric Handel. Its title is a play on words from Bach's set of preludes and fugues named The Well-Tempered Clavier.

Upon its release, the album peaked at No. 199 on the US Billboard 200 chart and was nominated for two Grammy Awards.

== Production ==
In 1969, during the unexpected commercial success of her debut studio album Switched-On Bach (1968), Carlos and her friend, collaborator, and producer Rachel Elkind started work on a follow-up using the same formula as Switched-On Bach: performing selections of classical music on a modular Moog synthesizer. Carlos planned to record an "ambitious 19th-century work", but the lack of sufficient multitrack recording capabilities at the time did not allow such an undertaking. Ideas for Carlos to record her own compositions seemed "untimely" and were shelved for potential future albums. The two decided on a "new switched on Baroque album" featuring multiple composers, including Johann Sebastian Bach, Claudio Monteverdi, Domenico Scarlatti, and George Frideric Handel.

Like Switched-On Bach, the album was recorded on an 8-track Ampex tape recorder using numerous takes and overdubs. Carlos chose pieces from Handel's Water Music suites as the music contained passages that suited the limitations of the Moog synthesizer.

Canadian pianist Glenn Gould spoke about Carlos' rendition of Brandenburg Concerto No. 4 in G major: "To put it bluntly, the finest performance of any of the Brandenburgs—live, canned, or intuited—I've ever heard."

== Release ==
The Well-Tempered Synthesizer was released in November 1969. It peaked at No. 199 on the Billboard Top LP's chart and was nominated for two Grammy Awards. In February 1974, Billboard reported that the album had sold around 200,000 copies in the US.

== Track listing ==
1. "Stereo Test Tone"
2. Monteverdi: Orfeo Suite (Toccata; Ritornello I; Choro II; Ritornello II; Choro II; Ritornello II)
3. Scarlatti: "Sonata in G major, L. 209/K. 455"
4. Scarlatti: "Sonata in D major, L. 164/K. 491"
5. Handel: Water Music: "Bourrée"
6. Handel: Water Music: "Air"
7. Handel: Water Music: "Allegro Deciso"
8. Scarlatti: "Sonata in E major, L. 430/K. 531"
9. Scarlatti: "Sonata in D major, L. 465/K. 96"
10. Bach: "Brandenburg Concerto #4 in G major: Allegro"
11. Bach: "Brandenburg Concerto #4 in G major: Andante"
12. Bach: "Brandenburg Concerto #4 in G major: Presto"
13. Monteverdi: "Domine ad adjuvandum" (from the 1610 Vespers)

== Personnel ==
- Wendy Carlos – modular Moog synthesizer, engineer
- Rachel Elkind – production
- Horn/Griner – cover photograph
