= A Clockwork Orange: Wendy Carlos's Complete Original Score =

Studio album by Wendy Carlos
- Released: 1972
- Recorded: 1971
- Genre: Electronic music
- Label: Columbia
- Producer: Rachel Elkind

Wendy Carlos chronology
A Clockwork Orange (1972)	A Clockwork Orange: Wendy Carlos's Complete Original Score (1972)	Switched-On Bach II (1973)

Professional ratings
Review scores
Source	Rating
AllMusic	4.5/5 stars

A Clockwork Orange: Wendy Carlos's Complete Original Score is a studio album by American musician and composer Wendy Carlos, released in 1972 by Columbia Records. The album contains previously unreleased and complete tracks from her score to Stanley Kubrick's 1971 film A Clockwork Orange that had been cut or omitted from the official soundtrack, Stanley Kubrick's Clockwork Orange, released three months earlier.

== Background ==
The album includes the complete version of Carlos's composition "Timesteps", originally intended as a lead-in to an electronic arrangement of the fourth movement to Symphony No. 9 by Beethoven. Carlos had written the opening to "Timesteps" prior to working on the film. She picked up the same-titled novel and noticed that the piece reflected the feeling of the first few chapters. Thereafter the piece developed into "an autonomous composition with an uncanny affinity for 'clockwork'" (the last word being Carlos's way of referring to the book). Among the instruments Carlos used for the score include a "spectrum follower", a prototype of a vocoder that converted the human voice into electronic signals that mirror the original note that has been played. Since the Ninth Symphony has a chorale section in the finale, Carlos felt it was an appropriate challenge for the new device. When the film version was announced Carlos and producer Rachel Elkind made a demonstration recording for Kubrick, who became interested and invited them to meet him in London.

The outcome was not entirely satisfying to Carlos in terms of total contribution to the film, but there remained the opportunity to present the music in a separate album, which led to this collection.

== Artwork ==
The record label did not attempt to use images from the movie on the album cover. The image chosen was a surrealistic collage of objects and images representing ideas in the film by visual artist Karenlee Grant. These included a rifle, an image of Beethoven inside the numeral "9", various mechanical images including a clockwork mechanism superimposed on a sliced orange, dancers representing the classical themes, and so on. This again was not entirely to Carlos' and Elkind's liking.

For the CD re-release, an image parodying the film's own logo was created and used on the cover. This artwork depicts Beethoven holding out a glass of drugged milk through the film poster's iconic A-shaped cutout, along with a clock, a close-up of the false eyelashes worn by Alex, and one of his bloody-eyeball cufflinks. The original cover image was presented on the back cover of the included booklet.

== Track listing ==
=== Original release (LP) (1972) ===
The original release contains the following tracks:

Side 1

Track title	Length	Notes
"Timesteps"	13:50	
"March from A Clockwork Orange"	7:00	Based on the choral movement of the Ninth Symphony by Beethoven.

Side 2

Track title	Length	Notes
"Title Music from A Clockwork Orange"	2:21	Based on Music for the Funeral of Queen Mary by Henry Purcell.
"La Gazza Ladra" ("The Thieving Magpie", Abridged) (Gioachino Rossini)	5:50	Not actually commissioned for the movie, but inspired by the movie's use of the orchestral version.
"Theme from A Clockwork Orange (Beethoviana)"	1:44	The title theme reset in the style of Beethoven and played using flute-like tones.
"Ninth Symphony: Second Movement"	4:52	An abridged electronic version of Beethoven's Scherzo.
"William Tell Overture (Abridged)" (Gioachino Rossini)	1:17	
"Country Lane"	4:43	An original piece originally intended to be used in a scene where the protagonist, Alex, is taken into the country and beaten by police. It restates themes from other compositions and also quotes the well-known Dies Irae theme. The words of the Dies Irae ("Dies iræ Dies illa. Solvet sæclum in favilla.") are also used, rendered through the vocoder.

=== CD release (2000) ===
2000 CD release
No.	Title	Notes	Length
1.	"Timesteps" (Full composition)		13:47
2.	"March from A Clockwork Orange"	Beethoven: Ninth Symphony: Fourth Movement, abridged	7:02
3.	"Title Music from A Clockwork Orange"	From Purcell's Music for the Funeral of Queen Mary	2:23
4.	"La Gazza Ladra"	Rossini's "The Thieving Magpie", abridged	6:00
5.	"Theme from A Clockwork Orange (Beethoviana)"		1:48
6.	"Ninth Symphony: Second Movement (Scherzo)"		4:52
7.	"William Tell Overture (Abridged)"		1:18
8.	"Orange Minuet"	Outtake for stage sequence, after Alex is brainwashed.	2:35
9.	"Biblical Daydreams"	Outtake to underscore battle images Alex fantasizes while reading the Old Testament in the prison library.	2:06
10.	"Country Lane" (Enhanced version)		4:56
