= Tron (soundtrack) =

Tron: Original Motion Picture Soundtrack
- Vinyl released by CBS Records

Soundtrack album by Wendy Carlos and Journey
- Released: July 9, 1982 (original release); 2002 (re-release)
- Recorded: London Philharmonic Orchestra (London)
- Genres: Synth-pop; arena rock
- Length: 49:41
- Labels: CBS (1982 release); Walt Disney (2002 release)
- Producer: Wendy Carlos

Journey chronology
Escape (1981)	Tron (1982)	Frontiers (1983)

Wendy Carlos chronology
The Shining (1980)	Tron (1982)	Digital Moonscapes (1984)

Professional ratings
Review scores
Source	Rating
Allmusic	4/5 stars

Tron: Original Motion Picture Soundtrack is the soundtrack album for the 1982 film of the same name, composed by Wendy Carlos with two additional musical tracks performed by the band Journey. The album was released on July 9, 1982, the day of release of the film.

== Background ==
The soundtrack for Tron was written by pioneer electronic musician Wendy Carlos, who is best known for her album Switched-On Bach and for the soundtracks to many films, including A Clockwork Orange and The Shining. The music, which was the first collaboration between Carlos and her partner Annemarie Franklin, featured a mix of an analog Moog synthesizer and a Crumar General Development System (GDS) digital synthesizer. The GDS was one of only ten made. The non-electronic pieces were performed by the London Philharmonic Orchestra (hired at the insistence of Disney, which was concerned that Carlos might not be able to complete her score on time). Two additional musical tracks were provided by the band Journey after British band Supertramp pulled out of the project.

Shortly before the release of Tron, Walt Disney Productions replaced the second part of the ending title's score with the song "Only Solutions". This was done after the soundtrack album was already completed, so the soundtrack album features Carlos' complete piece for the end titles. As one of the special features on the 2002 2 disc 20th anniversary DVD and Blu-ray versions of the film, a version of the end titles is presented with Carlos' score intact.

Shortly after Tron's theatrical release, Carlos said in an interview that she was not happy with the use of the orchestra, saying that her music, with its variable time signatures, was too difficult to perform in the time they were allotted. She would end up replacing portions of the orchestral performances with GDS performances.

The soundtrack album was released on record and tape by CBS Records in 1982. It was released again on CD in January 2002 by Walt Disney Records, with three additional tracks. Some of the film's music can also be heard in its companion arcade game. Finally, it was released again on vinyl in August 2014 by Walt Disney Records.

For years, the soundtrack was unavailable on CD, originally due to a dispute between Carlos and CBS Records. Carlos later discovered that the original master tapes were in need of tape baking due to sticky-shed syndrome. This process was finally undertaken just prior to digital release in 2018.

== Track listing ==
All tracks composed by Wendy Carlos, except where noted.

No.	Title	Length
1.	"Creation of Tron"	0:49
2.	"Only Solutions" (Performed by Journey; composed by Jonathan Cain, Neal Schon, Steve Perry.)	3:39
3.	"We've Got Company"	2:18
4.	"Wormhole"	2:26
5.	"Ring Game and Escape"	2:58
6.	"Water, Music, and Tronaction"	2:25
7.	"Tron Scherzo"	1:46
8.	"Miracle and Magician"	2:41
9.	"Magic Landings"	3:42
10.	"Theme From Tron"	1:32
11.	"1990's Theme" (Performed by Journey; composed by Jonathan Cain, Neal Schon.)	1:28
12.	"Love Theme"	2:07
13.	"Tower Music / Let Us Pray"	3:45
14.	"The Light Sailer"	2:36
15.	"Sea of Simulation"	3:22
16.	"A New Tron and the MCP"	5:25
17.	"Anthem"	1:36
18.	"Ending Titles"	5:06
Total length:		49:41

Bonus tracks
No.	Title	Length
1.	"Tronaction" (Original Version)	1:29
2.	"Break In (For Strings, Flutes, and Celesta)"	5:34
3.	"Anthem for Keyboard Solo"	1:09
Total length:		57.53

== Cover versions ==
Chiptune artists 8 Bit Weapon released an 8-bit music tribute to the original Tron soundtrack. The tribute was made using vintage computers and video game consoles such as Commodore 64, Nintendo Entertainment System, Game Boy, Apple II, and Atari 2600.
