= Ettore Stratta =

Italian-American musician (1933–2015)

Ettore Stratta (1933–2015) was an Italian-American musician, composer, conductor, producer and music industry executive. He was a record producer and conductor, who worked extensively across the popular, jazz and classical music realms, including many projects (such as his Symphonic Elvis album) that fused elements of several genres.

== Biography ==
Stratta was born on 30 March 1933 in Cuneo, Italy. He studied piano and composition at the Conservatorio di Santa Cecilia in Rome.

After migrating to the US, Sratta became an A&R executive at Columbia Records in the 1960s. In 1967 he was instrumental in helping producer Rachel Elkind and composer-musician Wendy Carlos to secure a contract with Columbia, which led to the release of the hit album Switched-On Bach (1968), which won three Grammy awards and became the best-selling classical album of all time.

Stratta produced for Barbra Streisand, Dave Brubeck, Tony Bennett, Nini Rosso, Andy Williams and others. He also produced for Al Jarreau, Dori Caymmi, Hubert Laws and Paquito D’Rivera, and was a resident or guest conductor for many major orchestras including the London Symphony Orchestra, Melbourne Symphony, Adelaide Symphony Orchestra, St Luke's Symphony Orchestra, and L’ Orchestra de Lille in France. In the jazz-classical genre, he worked with Stephane Grappelli, Lena Horne, Dave Grusin, Ramsey Lewis, Nancy Wilson, Hank Jones, Toots Thielemans, Dick Hyman, and Michel Legrand.

Stratta directed music for concerts with Gregory Hines, Nancy Wilson, Stephane Grappelli, Vic Damone, Michel Legrand, Rita Coolidge and others.

Stratta died in New York on 9 July 2015 at the age of 82.
