= Sonic Seasonings =

Studio album by Wendy Carlos
- Released: 1972
- Recorded: 1970–1971
- Genre: Electronic; ambient; experimental; new-age
- Length: 86:02
- Label: Columbia Records
- Producer: Wendy Carlos

Wendy Carlos chronology
The Well-Tempered Synthesizer (1969)	Sonic Seasonings (1972)	A Clockwork Orange (1972)

Sonic Seasonings is a studio double album by American keyboardist and composer Wendy Carlos in 1972 by Columbia Records. The album features four ambient music tracks, each based on one of the four seasons, combining various field recordings with sounds from a Moog synthesizer. It marks a departure from her previous two albums, which featured synthesized renditions of pieces of classical music. The album reached No. 168 on the US Billboard 200. In 1998, it was remastered for CD with two previously unreleased tracks.

== Production ==
Following the release of her second studio album, The Well-Tempered Synthesizer, in late 1969, the second featuring synthesized pieces of classical music, Carlos proceeded to change musical direction for her next album. Collaborating with friend and producer Rachel Elkind, the two sought to produce music that was "deliberately minimal" and had "a much longer span" than was typical of contemporary music at the time. The two decided on an album with four long tracks, each loosely based on one of the four seasons, partly constructed with improvised and composed passages. Various field recordings of nature are incorporated into the pieces, including wind on "Fall", bird song on "Spring", and insects on "Summer".

The album was recorded on a 3-M tape machine, which was restored with modern components in preparation for the album's 1998 remastering.

== Release ==
Professional ratings
Review scores
Source	Rating
Allmusic	4.5/5 stars

Upon its release in 1972, Sonic Seasonings reached No. 168 on the US Billboard Top LP's chart. Initially, Carlos wished for Columbia Records to release the album in the Compatible Discrete 4 quadrophonic sound system, but the label refused to do so.

== Legacy ==
Sonic Seasonings is widely regarded as the first new-age music album. It was released six years before Brian Eno coined the term "ambient music" with his release, Ambient 1: Music for Airports (1978).

== Track listing ==
Side one
No.	Title	Length
1.	"Spring"	22:28

Side two
No.	Title	Length
1.	"Summer"	21:44

Side three
No.	Title	Length
1.	"Fall"	21:09

Side four
No.	Title	Length
1.	"Winter"	20:41

=== 1998 CD reissue ===
East Side Digital reissued Sonic Seasonings in 1998 as a remastered two-CD set, containing the original album, one out-take track, and two previously unreleased compositions.

Disc one
No.	Title	Length
1.	"Spring"	22:28
2.	"Summer"	21:44
3.	"Fall"	21:09

Disc two
No.	Title	Length
1.	"Winter"	20:41
2.	"Winter (Outtake)"	5:21
3.	"Aurora Borealis"	19:55
4.	"Midnight Sun"	19:57

== Personnel ==
- Wendy Carlos – synthesizers, field recordings, design, mastering, engineering
- Rachel Elkind – vocals on "Winter", original package design, liner notes
- Ed Lee – original package design
- Ogata Kōrin – cover art
- Jorma Puranen – tundra photograph
- Annemarie Franklin – executive producer
