= A Clockwork Orange (soundtrack) =

Stanley Kubrick's A Clockwork Orange

Soundtrack album by Wendy Carlos
- Released: 1972
- Recorded: 1971
- Genre: Classical music
- Label: Warner Bros.

Wendy Carlos chronology
Sonic Seasonings (1972)	Stanley Kubrick's A Clockwork Orange (1972)	A Clockwork Orange: Wendy Carlos's Complete Original Score (1972)

Stanley Kubrick's A Clockwork Orange is a soundtrack album released in 1972 by Warner Bros. Records, featuring music from Stanley Kubrick's 1971 film A Clockwork Orange. It includes pieces of classical music and electronic music by American composer and musician Wendy Carlos, whom Kubrick hired to write the film's original score. Music that Carlos recorded for the film that remained unreleased, including complete tracks, was released three months later on her album A Clockwork Orange: Wendy Carlos's Complete Original Score.

== Background ==
Some of the music is heard only as excerpts, e.g. Edward Elgar's Pomp and Circumstance March No. 1 (a.k.a. Land of Hope and Glory) heralding a politician's appearance at the prison. The main theme is an electronic transcription of Henry Purcell's Music for the Funeral of Queen Mary, composed in 1695, for the procession of Queen Mary's cortège through London en route to Westminster Abbey.

"March from 'A Clockwork Orange'" (based on the choral movement of the Ninth Symphony by Beethoven) was the first recorded song featuring a vocoder for the singing; synthpop bands often cite it as their inspiration. Neither the end credits nor the soundtrack album identify the orchestra playing the Ninth Symphony excerpts; however, in Alex's bedroom, there is a close-up of a microcassette tape, labeled: Deutsche Grammophon – Ludwig van Beethoven – Symphonie Nr. 9 d-moll, op. 125 – Berliner Philharmoniker – Chor der St. Hedwigskathedrale – Ferenc Fricsay – Irmgard Seefried, Maureen Forrester, Dietrich Fischer-Dieskau, Ernst Haefliger.

In the novel, Alex is accidentally conditioned against all classical music, but in the film, only against Ludwig van Beethoven's Ninth Symphony, the soundtrack of a violent Ludovico Technique film that Alex is exposed to. The audience does not see every violent film Alex is forced to view during his Ludovico conditioning, yet the symphony's fourth movement is heard. Later, using the symphony's second movement, Mr Alexander, and fellow plotters, impel Alex to attempt suicide.

== Track listing ==
Side One
No.	Title	Writer(s)	Performer	Length
1.	"Title Music from A Clockwork Orange" (From Henry Purcell's Music for the Funeral of Queen Mary)	Carlos, Rachel Elkind	Wendy Carlos	2:21
2.	"The Thieving Magpie (Abridged)"	Gioachino Rossini	A Deutsche Grammophon Recording (Rome Opera House Orchestra conducted by Tullio Serafin, 1963, uncredited)	5:57
3.	"Theme from A Clockwork Orange (Beethoviana)" (From Henry Purcell's Music for the Funeral of Queen Mary)	Carlos, Elkind	Wendy Carlos	1:44
4.	"Ninth Symphony, Second Movement (Abridged)"	Ludwig van Beethoven	A Deutsche Grammophon Recording (Berlin Philharmonic conducted by Ferenc Fricsay, 1958, uncredited)	3:48
5.	"March from A Clockwork Orange (Ninth Symphony, Fourth Movement, Abridged)"	Beethoven, arr. Carlos; Friedrich Schiller (lyric)	Wendy Carlos (Articulations: Rachel Elkind)	7:00
6.	"William Tell Overture (Abridged)"	Rossini	Wendy Carlos	1:17

Side Two
No.	Title	Writer(s)	Performer	Length
7.	"Pomp and Circumstance March No. I"	Edward Elgar	(Marcus Dods, uncredited)	4:28
8.	"Pomp and Circumstance March No. IV (Abridged)"	Edward Elgar	(Marcus Dods, uncredited)	1:33
9.	"Timesteps (Excerpt)"	Carlos	Wendy Carlos	4:13
10.	"Overture to the Sun" (rerecorded instrumental from Sound of Sunforest, 1970)	Tucker	Terry Tucker	1:40
11.	"I Want to Marry a Lighthouse Keeper" (rerecorded song from Sound of Sunforest, 1970; film version differs from soundtrack version)	Eigen	Erika Eigen	1:00
12.	"William Tell Overture (Abridged)"	Rossini	A Deutsche Grammophon Recording (Rome Opera House Orchestra conducted by Tullio Serafin, 1963, uncredited)	2:58
13.	"Suicide Scherzo (Ninth Symphony, Second Movement, Abridged)"	Beethoven, arr. Carlos	Wendy Carlos	3:07
14.	"Ninth Symphony, Fourth Movement (Abridged)"	Ludwig van Beethoven	A Deutsche Grammophon Recording (Berlin Philharmonic conducted by Herbert von Karajan, 1963, uncredited)	1:34
15.	"Singin' in the Rain" (recording taken from the soundtrack of the 1952 film)	lyrics by Arthur Freed, music by Nacio Herb Brown	Gene Kelly	2:36

Although two excerpts from Nikolai Rimsky-Korsakov's Scheherazade are heard during Alex's Biblical daydreams while reading the Bible in prison, this piece does not appear on the soundtrack album, nor is it listed in the closing credits.

However, its presence in the film is acknowledged by critic Michel Ciment in the filmography in the back of his book Kubrick, and at least the composer's name is mentioned as used in the soundtrack in three other books on either Kubrick or the film.

According to Kristopher Spencer's book on film scores both Rimsky-Korsakov's Scheherazade and Terry Tucker's Overture to the Sun were used by Kubrick originally as temp tracks for the film, but he ultimately chose to stick to these rather than the pieces Carlos composed for those sections. He states the original LP omitted the first due to lack of space on a traditional vinyl LP recording.

== Second version ==
Three months after the official soundtrack's release, composer Carlos released A Clockwork Orange: Wendy Carlos's Complete Original Score (1972) (Columbia KC 31480), a second version of the soundtrack containing unused cues and musical elements unheard in the film. For example, Kubrick used only part of "Timesteps", and a short version of the synthesiser transcription of the Ninth Symphony's Scherzo. The second soundtrack album contains a synthesiser version of Rossini's "La Gazza Ladra" (The Thieving Magpie); the film contains an orchestral version. In 1998, a digitally-remastered album edition, with tracks of the synthesiser music was released. It contains Carlos' compositions, including those unused in the film, and the "Biblical Daydreams" and "Orange Minuet" cues excluded from the 1972 edition.

Carlos composed the first three minutes of "Timesteps" before reading the novel A Clockwork Orange. Originally intending it as the introduction to a vocoder rendition of the Ninth Symphony's Choral movement; it was completed approximately when Kubrick completed the photography; "Timesteps" and the vocoder Ninth Symphony were the foundation for the Carlos–Kubrick collaboration.

Moreover, Stanley Kubrick asked Pink Floyd bassist Roger Waters to use elements of the Atom Heart Mother suite. Waters refused when he found that Kubrick wanted the freedom to cut up the piece to fit the film. Later, Waters asked Kubrick if he could use sounds from 2001: A Space Odyssey; Kubrick duly refused. That album can be seen in the film, during the scene in the record store.

== Charts ==
Chart (1972)	Peak Position
United States (Billboard)	146
Australia (Kent Music Report)	18
Italy (Musica e dischi)	1

== Certifications ==
Region	Certification	Certified units/sales
Australia (ARIA)	Platinum	70,000^{^}
^{^} Shipments figures based on certification alone.
