= Switched-On Bach II =

Studio album by Wendy Carlos
- Released: 1973
- Genre: Electronic; baroque
- Length: 39:28
- Label: Columbia Masterworks; East Side Digital (reissue)
- Producer: Rachel Elkind

Wendy Carlos chronology
Walter Carlos' Clockwork Orange (1972)	Switched-On Bach II (1973)	By Request (1975)

Switched-On Bach II is an album by Wendy Carlos, released in 1973 on Columbia Records and produced by Carlos and Rachel Elkind. It is a sequel to the 1968 album Switched-On Bach.

In February 1974, Billboard reported that the album had sold over 70,000 copies in its first five weeks of release.

== Tracks ==
All composed by Johann Sebastian Bach (except that the four pieces from the Notebook for Anna Magdalena Bach are either doubtful or spurious):

- Selections from Suite No. 2 in B minor, BWV 1067:
  - Badinerie (1:25)
  - Minuet (1:20)
  - Bourrée (1:40)
- Two-Part Inventions:
  - in A minor, BWV 784 (1:20)
  - in A major, BWV 783 (1:10)
- "Sheep may safely graze", from Cantata No. 208, BWV 208 (5:00)
- Suite from Anna Magdalena Notebook:
  - Musette in D major, BWV Anh. 126 (1:10) – possibly by J.S. Bach
  - Minuet in G major, BWV Anh. 114 (1:40) – composed by Christian Petzold
  - "Bist du bei mir", BWV 508 (2:15) – an arrangement of an opera aria by Gottfried Heinrich Stölzel
  - Marche in D major, BWV Anh. 122 (1:00) – possibly by Carl Philipp Emanuel Bach or J.S. Bach
- Brandenburg Concerto No. 5 in D major, BWV 1050:
  - Allegro (10:45)
  - Affetuoso (5:35)
  - Allegro (4:50)
