= Sheep may safely graze =

Aria composed by Johann Sebastian Bach

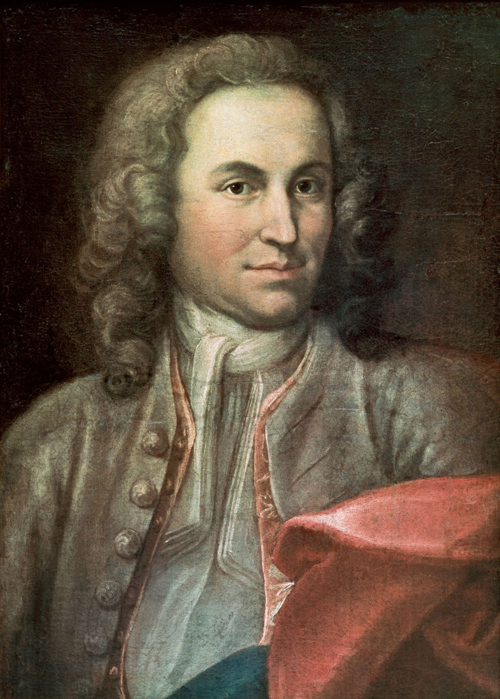
Portrait of J. S. Bach by Joachim Ernst Rentsch, 1715

"Sheep may safely graze" (German: Schafe können sicher weiden) is a soprano aria by Johann Sebastian Bach to words by Salomon Franck. The piece was written in 1713 and is part of the cantata Was mir behagt, ist nur die muntre Jagd, BWV 208 (Only the lively hunt pleases me), also known as the Hunting Cantata.

Like Bach's "Jesu, Joy of Man's Desiring", "Sheep may safely graze" is frequently played at weddings. However, the cantata BWV 208 was originally written for a birthday celebration of Christian, Duke of Saxe-Weissenfels. Bach was based at the nearby court of Weimar, and musicians from both courts appear to have joined in the first performance in Weißenfels. Bach is known to have used the music again for other celebrations, but it remained unpublished until after his death.

== Instrumentation ==
Bach had a Baroque instrumental ensemble at his disposal including two horns, an instrument associated with the hunt. For this number (movement 9 of the complete work), the singer is not accompanied by the full ensemble used elsewhere in the cantata, but by two recorders and continuo. The use of flute-like instruments is typical of pastoral music.

Since the revival of Bach's music in the 19th century, "Sheep may safely graze" has been arranged for other instruments.

== Text ==
External audio
- "Sheep may safely graze", sung by soprano Elisabeth Schwarzkopf in 1954 – via Internet Archive

The piece's title evokes a pastoral scene and has been referenced in discussions of how European culture depicts domestic animals and sheep in particular.

In the cantata, the recitative and aria are sung by the role of the ancient Roman god of shepherds, flocks, and livestock, Pales. Pales compares the peaceful life of sheep under a watchful shepherd to the inhabitants of a state with a wise ruler. When not performed within the cantata, the recitative is typically omitted.

Schafe können sicher weiden
Wo ein guter Hirte wacht.

Wo Regenten wohl regieren
Kann man Ruh' und Friede spüren
Und was Länder glücklich macht.

Sheep can safely graze
where a good shepherd watches over them.

Where rulers are ruling well,
we may feel peace and rest
and what makes countries happy.

== Recordings ==
The work has often been recorded. It can be found in:

- recordings of the complete cantata, for example:
  - Bach: Secular Cantatas Vol. 2 (Hunting Cantata plus Die Zeit, die Tag und Jahre macht). Bach Collegium Japan, Joanne Lunn (soprano), Masaaki Suzuki (conductor).
- compilation albums, for example albums featuring the following soloists:
  - Emma Kirkby (soprano), (Emma Kirkby Collection)
  - Magdalena Kožená (mezzo-soprano), (J. S. Bach: Arias with Musica Florea)
  - Danielle de Niese (soprano), (Beauty of Baroque with the English Concert)
  - Nuria Rial (soprano), (Bach Arias with the Kammerorchester Basel directed by Julia Schröder).

== Arrangements ==
"Sheep may safely graze"
Instrumental arrangement by Kevin MacLeod

=== Keyboard ===
==== Piano ====
"Sheep may safely graze" was arranged for piano by the American composer Mary Howe. Another notable piano transcription was made by Dutch pianist Egon Petri, published in 1944.

Sometimes the piece is played as a duet (piano-four-hands); there are versions by Duo Petrof, and Lang Lang and Gina Redlinger (released as a bonus track with Lang Lang's recording of the Goldberg Variations).

==== Moog synthesiser ====
American composer and electronic musician Wendy Carlos arranged and recorded "Sheep may safely graze" on a Moog synthesizer for her 1973 album Switched-On Bach II.

=== Band and orchestra ===
Australian-born composer Percy Grainger wrote "Blithe Bells" for elastic scoring in 1931 on Bach's "Sheep may safely graze". In March 1931, he scored a wind band version.

The piece was arranged for string orchestra by British composer Granville Bantock. There is also an orchestral arrangement by British composer Sir William Walton, part of the ballet score The Wise Virgins.
