= Canonic Trio Sonata in F major, BWV 1040 =

Composition by Johann Sebastian Bach

The Canonic Trio Sonata in F major is a short piece by Johann Sebastian Bach, catalogued as BWV 1040. The instrumentation is for oboe, violin, and basso continuo (generally a combination of cello and harpsichord or such). Played adagio, the 27-measure, common time piece is less than two minutes long.

It was probably first performed on 23 February 1712 (or 1713). Besides being a stand-alone piece, Bach also incorporated it into the soprano aria Weil die wollenreichen Herden (While the flocks rich in wool) in the Hunting Cantata BWV 208 and into an aria Mein gläubiges Herze (My faithful heart) in Cantata BWV 68. In fact, in his book The Faber Pocket Guide to Bach, Sir Nicholas Kenyon dismisses the piece, saying "The trio BWV 1040 does not really need a number of its own since it is the wholly delightful trio sonata that springs as a postlude from Cantata 208 and then Cantata 68". Nevertheless, it is performed in its own right as an instrumental piece.
