= Was mir behagt, ist nur die muntre Jagd, BWV 208 =

Cantata by Johann Sebastian Bach

Was mir behagt, ist nur die muntre Jagd
- BWV 208.1 · 208
- Secular cantata by J. S. Bach
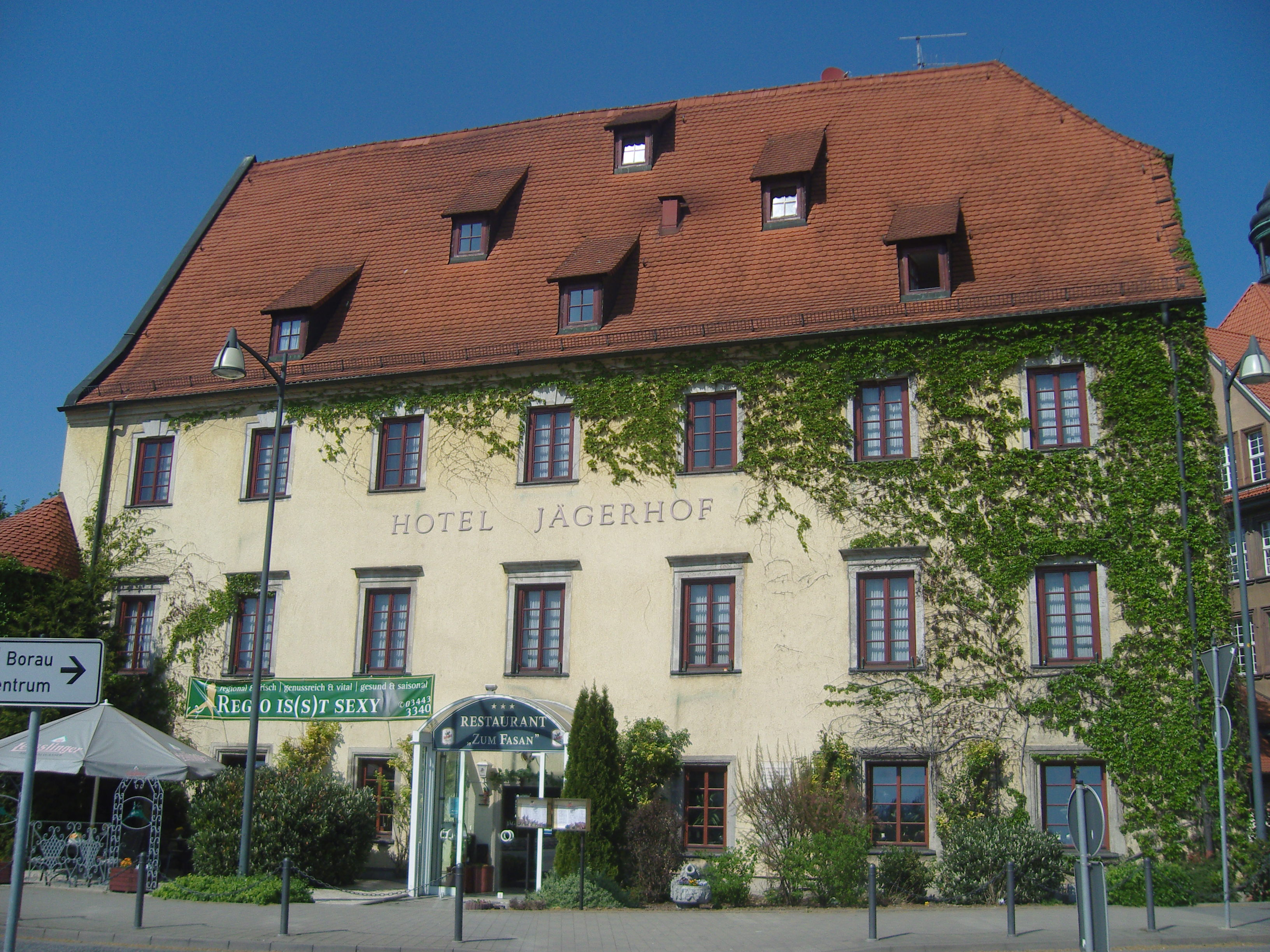
- Jägerhof in Weißenfels, a former hunting lodge, where the cantata is believed to have been first performed
- Related: BWV 208.2, 208.3, 1040 and possibly 1046a
- Occasion: Birthday of Christian of Saxe-Weissenfels
- Cantata text: Salomon Franck
- Performed: 27 February 1713: Weißenfels
- Movements: 15
- Vocal: SATB soloists and choir
- Instrumental: 2 horns; 2 recorders; 2 oboes; taille; bassoon; 2 violins; viola; violone; continuo

Was mir behagt, ist nur die muntre Jagd (The lively hunt is all my heart's desire), BWV 208.1, BWV 208, also known as the Hunting Cantata, is a secular cantata composed by Johann Sebastian Bach, belatedly for the birthday of Duke Christian of Saxe-Weissenfels on 27 February 1713. A performance lasts about forty minutes. The aria "Schafe können sicher weiden" ("Sheep May Safely Graze") is the most familiar part of this cantata.

== History and text ==
It is Bach's earliest surviving secular cantata, composed while he was employed as court organist in Weimar. The work may have been intended as a 31st birthday gift from Bach's employer, William Ernest, Duke of Saxe-Weimar, for his neighbouring ruler, Duke Christian, who was a keen hunter.

Bach is known to have stayed in Weißenfels in 1713 for the birthday celebrations. He went on to earn more commissions from Saxe-Weissenfels, and in 1729, Bach was appointed Royal Kapellmeister, but this position as court composer did not require residence at court.

=== Text ===
The text is by Salomon Franck, the Weimar court poet, who published it in part 2 of Geist- und Weltlicher Poesien (Jena, 1716). The music was published in 1881 in the first complete edition of the composer's works, the Bach-Gesellschaft Ausgabe.

As was common at the time, Franck's flattering text draws on classical mythology and features such characters as Diana, the goddess of the hunt. Franck also followed convention in associating good government with the hunt. As well as displaying the hunter's daring, hunting was supposed to develop patience and collaboration.

== Scoring and structure ==
The cantata was scored for four vocalist soloists:

- Diana, soprano I
- Pales, soprano II
- Endymion, tenor
- Pan, bass

The instrumental parts comprised two horns, two recorders, two oboes, taille, bassoon, two violins, viola, cello, violone, and continuo. Recorders are appropriate for their pastoral associations and horns for their hunting associations. So far as is known, it is Bach's earliest work featuring horns. He is assumed to have been writing for horn players employed at the Weissenfels court, where there was a tradition of brass playing.

There has been speculation that the cantata opened with a sinfonia (BWV 1046a), which has similar scoring to the cantata and is an early version of Brandenburg Concerto No. 1 in F major (BWV 1046). The sinfonia seems to be intended for more able horn players than required for the cantata, and may have been composed later, but it appears in some recorded versions of the cantata, for example those of Goodman and Suzuki.

The work has fifteen movements:

1. Recitative: Was mir behagt, ist nur die muntre Jagd! (in F major/B flat major, for soprano I with continuo)
2. Aria: Jagen ist die Lust der Götter (in F major, for soprano I with 2 horns and continuo)
3. Recitative: Wie, schönste Göttin? wie? (in D minor, for tenor with continuo)
4. Aria: Willst du dich nicht mehr ergötzen (in D minor, for tenor with continuo)
5. Recitative: Ich liebe dich zwar noch! (in B flat major/C major, for soprano I and tenor with continuo)
6. Recitative: Ich, der ich sonst ein Gott (in A minor/G major, for bass and continuo)
7. Aria: Ein Fürst ist seines Landes Pan (in C major, for bass with 2 oboes, taille and continuo) – music reused for Aria 4 in Also hat Gott die Welt geliebt, BWV 68
8. Recitative: Soll dann der Pales Opfer hier das letzte sein? (in F major/G minor, for soprano II with continuo)
9. Aria: Schafe können sicher weiden, a.k.a. "Sheep May Safely Graze" (in B flat major, for soprano II with 2 recorders and continuo)
10. Recitative: So stimmt mit ein und lasst des Tages Lust volkommen sein (in F major, for soprano I with continuo)
11. Chorus: Lebe, Sonne dieser Erden (in F major, for sopranos I and II, tenor, bass with 2 horns, 2 oboes, taille, bassoon and cello in unison, cords, violone and continuo – Oboe 1 with violin 1, oboe 2 with violin 2, taille with viola; cello with bassoon, violone with continuo)
12. Aria (duet): Entzücket uns beide, ihr Strahlen der Freude (in F major, for soprano I and tenor with violin solo and continuo)
13. Aria: Weil die wollenreichen Herden (in F major, for soprano II and continuo) – music reused for Aria 2 in BWV 68
  13a. Trio in F major, BWV 1040: instrumental movement based on the continuo theme of Aria No. 13. Listed as a separate composition in the first version of the BWV catalogue, this Trio was appended again to the cantata (as a postlude?) in the 1998 version of that catalogue, as it is in Bach's autograph.
14. Aria: Ihr Felder und Auen, lass grünend euch schauen (in F major, for bass with continuo)
15. Chorus: Ihr lieblichste Blicke, ihr freudige Stunden (in F major, for soprano I and II, tenor, bass with 2 horns, 2 oboes, taille, bassoon, cords, cello, violone and continuo) – music reused for Chorus 1 in BWV 149.

== Arrangements ==
=== Adaptations by Bach ===
Bach appears to have revived the work a few years after its original performance, this time in honour of Duke Ernst August, the co-ruler of Saxe-Weimar, who was also a hunter (BWV 208.2). While he was living in Leipzig he arranged music from two arias for the church cantata Also hat Gott die Welt geliebt, BWV 68 (composed in 1725) and the final chorus for Man singet mit Freuden vom Sieg, BWV 149 (1728 or 1729). Bach further adapted the entire cantata in 1742 as a name day cantata for Augustus III (BWV 208.3).

=== Adaptations by other people ===
So far as is known, "Sheep may safely graze" is not one of the numbers from the cantata which Bach chose to rearrange, but a variety of arrangements by other people exist. It is often played at weddings.

Schafe können sicher weiden
"Sheep May Safely Graze" (This is an instrumental arrangement of Bach's aria, which was scored for soprano with two recorders and continuo)

"Sheep May Safely Graze" can be played effectively on the piano, for example in the arrangement by the American composer Mary Howe, as well as the arrangement by Dutch pianist Egon Petri.

Australian-born composer Percy Grainger wrote several "free rambles" on Bach's "Sheep May Safely Graze". He first wrote "Blithe Bells" (as he called his free ramble), for "elastic scoring" between November 1930 and February 1931. In March 1931, he scored a wind band version. It became one of his most famous arrangements.

British composer William Walton re-orchestrated "Sheep May Safely Graze" for a ballet score based on music by Bach, The Wise Virgins. The ballet was created in 1940 with choreography by Frederick Ashton.

American composer and electronic musician Wendy Carlos arranged and recorded "Sheep May Safely Graze" on a Moog synthesizer for her 1973 album Switched-On Bach II.

== Selected recordings ==
- J.S. Bach: Jagd Cantata BWV 208, the Kammerorchester Berlin & the Berliner Barock Solisten with conductor Peter Schreier (who also sings the part of Endymion), Edith Mathis as Diana, Arleen Auger as Pales and Theo Adam as Pan, Naxos Digital Services, 1985.
- J.S. Bach: Cantata BWV 208, André Rieu, Monteverdi-Chor, Amsterdam Chamber Orchestra, Erna Spoorenberg, Irmgard Jacobeit, Tom Brand, Jacques Villisech, Telefunken, 1962
- J.S. Bach: Complete Cantatas Vol. 3, Ton Koopman, Amsterdam Baroque Orchestra & Choir, Barbara Schlick, Elisabeth von Magnus, Paul Agnew, Klaus Mertens, Antoine Marchand
- Wedding Cantata & Hunt Cantata (includes sinfonia), Roy Goodman, Parley of Instruments, Hyperion, 1985
- J.S. Bach: Hunting Cantata & Peasants' Cantata, Nikolaus Harnoncourt, Yvonne Kenny, Angela Maria Blasi, Kurt Equiluz, Robert Hall, Concentus Musicus Wien, Arnold Schoenberg Choir, Teldec 2292-46151-2 1990
- Bach: Secular Cantatas Vol. 2 (Hunt Cantata), Bach Collegium Japan, Masaaki Suzuki, BIS, 2011
- Bach: Kantaten No. 32, Orchester der J. S. Bach-Stiftung, Rudolf Lutz, J. S. Bach-Stiftung, 2020

== See also ==
Other birthday works by Bach include

- Alles mit Gott und nichts ohn' ihn, BWV 1127 (1713)
- Durchlauchtster Leopold, BWV 173a (probably 1722)
- Entfliehet, verschwindet, entweichet, ihr Sorgen, BWV 249a (1725)
