= Columbia Masterworks Records =

American record label

Columbia Masterworks
- Parent company: Columbia Records
- Founded: 1924; 102 years ago
- Defunct: 1980
- Genre: Classical
- Country of origin: U.S.
- Location: New York City

Columbia Masterworks was a record label started in 1924 by Columbia Records. In 1980, it was separated from the Columbia label and renamed CBS Masterworks. In 1990, it was revived as Sony Classical after its sale to the Sony Corporation.

== History ==
When Columbia Records undertook the project of releasing great classical music for domestic sale in America, the label was still a year away from an "electrical" recording process. In November 1924, the first eight releases had been recorded acoustically. These first eight sets included five symphonic recordings—Beethoven's Seventh and Eighth Symphonies, Dvorak's "From the New World", Mozart's E-Flat Major (No. 39), and Tchaikovsky's "Pathetique". Three recordings by quartets were also part of that initial offering. More releases followed in March 1925, and a staggering 18 sets were added that fall. The prices of these sets varied with the number of included discs, from $4.50 to $10.50.

Under the leadership of Columbia's president Goddard Lieberson, who later added the rest of the Columbia label to his portfolio, a great many notable classical artists made contributions to the Columbia Masterworks library, such as the conductors Leonard Bernstein, Eugene Ormandy and George Szell; pianists Walter Gieseking, Oscar Levant and Glenn Gould; and the organist E. Power Biggs. Composers Aaron Copland and Igor Stravinsky also appeared conducting their own works.

== Broadway albums ==
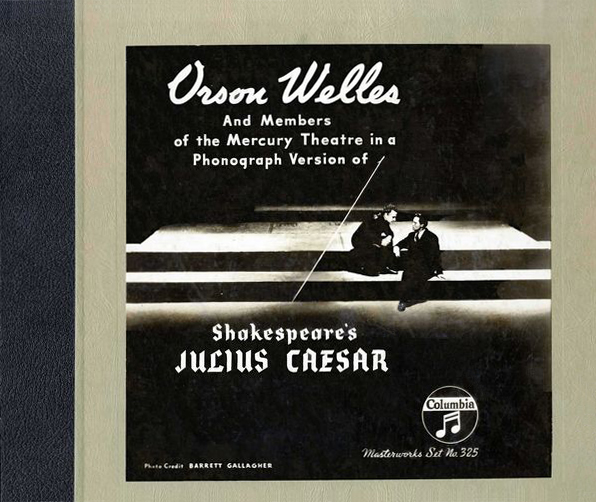
Mercury Theatre original cast recording for Caesar (Columbia Masterworks M-325, 1939)

In addition to classical music, Columbia also issued cast recordings, soundtrack albums, and spoken-word recordings under the Masterworks name. One of the first spoken word albums of historical significance was the Masterworks release of ten scenes from the Mercury Theatre's Broadway production of Caesar (Columbia Masterworks Set No. 325), recorded in March 1938 and released in 1939. Sales were such that Columbia engaged Welles and the Mercury Theatre to produce four Shakespeare plays (Twelfth Night, The Merchant of Venice, Julius Caesar and Macbeth) for the phonograph in 1939 and 1940. The sets were opulently bound and included a hardcover book.

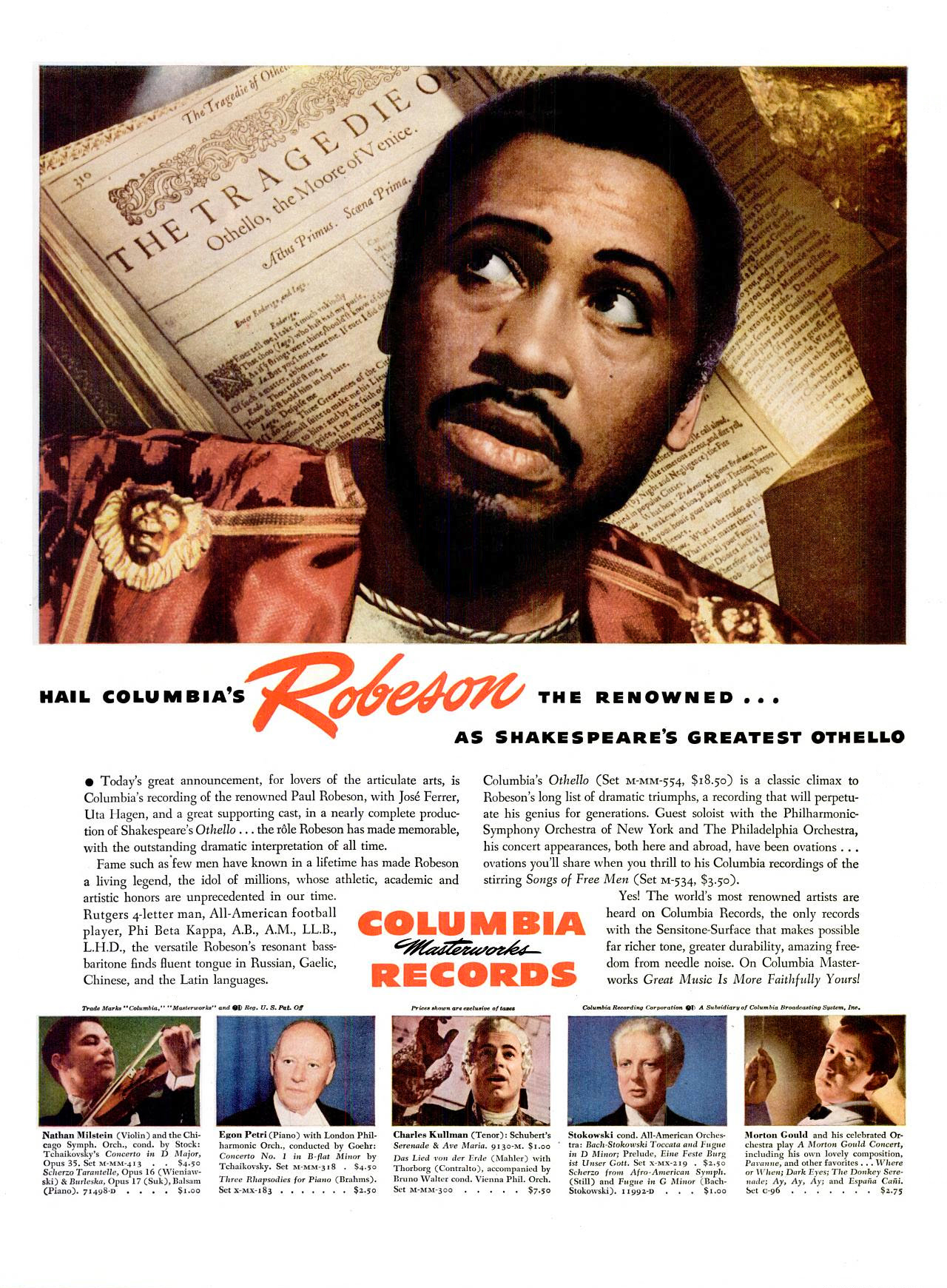
Advertisement for the Columbia Masterworks release of Othello starring Paul Robeson (1945)

The first wildly successful spoken word album was a 1948 Masterworks entry, the first I Can Hear It Now album (Columbia M-800 and ML-4095), edited by Edward R. Murrow and Fred W. Friendly and supervised by former CBS staffer J.G. Gude. The album would lead to three sequels, the Hear It Now program on the CBS Radio Network in 1950 and the CBS-TV successor, See It Now, in 1951. Columbia Masterworks was also the first recording company to release an album of a nearly complete stage production—the record-breaking 1943 Broadway revival of Shakespeare's Othello, starring Paul Robeson, José Ferrer and Uta Hagen. This was released in 1945 as a 17-record 78 rpm album in two binders (M-MM-554), and afterwards as a three-LP set (SL-153). Many years later, in 1962, Columbia Masterworks would release a four-LP album of the complete Who's Afraid of Virginia Woolf?, starring its original Broadway cast: Uta Hagen, Arthur Hill, George Grizzard and Melinda Dillon. And in 1964, Columbia Masterworks would release a complete album of the 1964 Broadway revival of Richard Burton's Hamlet, starring Richard Burton and directed by John Gielgud—the longest-running Hamlet in Broadway history to date.

Columbia Masterworks' most successful Broadway album was the original cast recording of My Fair Lady (OL-5090, 1956), starring Rex Harrison, Julie Andrews, Stanley Holloway and Robert Coote. This first album was issued only in mono, but the first stereo recording of My Fair Lady—featuring the same four stars, this time with the London cast—followed in 1959. And in 1964, Columbia Masterworks issued the film soundtrack album of the show, starring Rex Harrison and Audrey Hepburn's "singing voice", Marni Nixon. The most successful film soundtrack release on Columbia Masterworks was the film version of West Side Story, released as OS-2070 in 1961 and being certified triple-platinum as of 2017. Next on the list is The Graduate, released in 1968 as OS-3180, featuring the music of Paul Simon and Art Garfunkel, then the best-selling pop music act on the roster of the parent Columbia label. Partly as a result of the immense popularity of this release, Columbia Masterworks also released a spoken-word recording of excerpts from the soundtrack of the Dustin Hoffman film Little Big Man.

Columbia Masterworks was also responsible for the original cast albums of Kiss Me, Kate (1948) and South Pacific (1949), as well as for the original stage album of West Side Story (1957), and the original cast recordings of Gypsy (1959), The Sound of Music (again 1959), Flower Drum Song (1958), and Camelot (1960). In 1946, Columbia Masterworks released the first album of Show Boat featuring the cast of an actual production of the show, not just one or two singers from it as had been done before. This 1946 revival of Show Boat, which starred Jan Clayton, Charles Fredericks, Carol Bruce, Ralph Dumke, and Kenneth Spencer, was the longest-running revival of a show up to that time. They also released a long series of studio cast albums of Broadway shows, such as The Student Prince, The Desert Song, Girl Crazy, Oh, Kay!, and again, Show Boat.

== Electronic music ==
Another genre that Columbia Masterworks released some seminal albums in was electronic music. Early 1964 saw the release of Columbia-Princeton Electronic Music Center, a compilation of avant-garde electronic compositions created at the famed studio by Bulent Arel, Milton Babbitt, Vladimir Ussachevsky, and others. In 1968, Wendy Carlos's landmark electronic-music album Switched-On Bach, containing transcriptions of a number of Bach's most famous compositions for the Moog synthesizer, was issued on Columbia Masterworks, which continued to release Carlos's output until the mid-1980s. Terry Riley's A Rainbow in Curved Air was released in the summer of 1969. Morton Subotnick's Sidewinder followed in 1971. The label also released several other classical-meets-synthesiser albums in the wake of the Switched-On Bach success.

== 1980 and later ==
Columbia Masterworks was renamed CBS Masterworks in 1980 and separated from the Columbia label. In 1990, it was renamed Sony Classical because of the sale of CBS Records to the Sony Corporation.

The Masterworks name lives on in the label's Broadway album label, Masterworks Broadway as well as the name of the label's parent Sony Masterworks.

== See also ==
- List of record labels
