= Switched-On Bach =

Studio album by Wendy Carlos
- Released: October 1968
- Recorded: 1967–1968
- Genre: Electronic; baroque
- Length: 39:45
- Label: Columbia Masterworks
- Producer: Wendy Carlos, Rachel Elkind

Wendy Carlos chronology
Switched-On Bach (1968)	The Well-Tempered Synthesizer (1969)

Alternative cover
- Original cover with Bach sitting

Switched-On Bach is the debut album by the American composer Wendy Carlos, released in October 1968 by Columbia Records. Produced by Carlos and Rachel Elkind, the album is a collection of pieces by Johann Sebastian Bach performed by Carlos and Benjamin Folkman on a Moog synthesizer. It played a key role in bringing synthesizers to popular music, which had until then been mostly used in experimental music.

Switched-On Bach reached number 10 on the US Billboard 200 chart and topped the Billboard Classical Albums chart from 1969 to 1972. By June 1974, it had sold over one million copies, and in 1986 it became the second classical album to be certified platinum. In 1970, it won Grammy Awards for Best Classical Album, Best Classical Performance – Instrumental Soloist or Soloists (With or Without Orchestra), and Best Engineered Classical Recording.

After Carlos came out as a transgender woman in 1979, reissues of Switched-On Bach amended the artist credit to reflect her change of name, as was the case with the rest of her discography up to that point.

== Background ==
Around 1967, Wendy Carlos asked Rachel Elkind to listen to her electronic compositions. They included compositions written ten years earlier, as well as some from 1964 co-written with her friend Benjamin Folkman at the Columbia-Princeton Electronic Music Center in New York City. One recording was a rendition of Johann Sebastian Bach's Two-Part Invention in F major for Moog synthesizer, which Carlos described as "charming".

Soon after, Carlos began plans to produce an album of Bach pieces performed on the Moog. She intended to use the novel technology to make "appealing music you could really listen to", rather than what she considered to be the "ugly" music being produced by avant-garde musicians at the time. Elkind was impressed with Carlos' recording of the Brandenburg Concerto No. 3 in G major and became the album's producer. Elkind contacted producer and conductor Ettore Stratta of Columbia Records, who "generously spread his enthusiasm throughout the rest of the company" and assisted in the album's production. Paul Myers of Columbia Masterworks granted Carlos, Folkman, and Elkind artistic freedom.

== Recording ==
First Movement (Allegro) of Brandenburg Concerto Number 3
A sample of "Brandenburg Concerto No. 3 in G Major - First Movement".

Switched-On Bach features ten pieces by Bach available under the public domain performed by Carlos, with assistance from Folkman, on a Moog synthesizer. Carlos had worked closely with designer Robert Moog, testing his components and suggesting improvements. Most of the album was recorded in a rented studio apartment in which Carlos lived at 410 West End Avenue on the West Side of Manhattan in New York City, using a custom-built 8-track recording machine constructed by Carlos from components built by Ampex. The initial track created, however, the Invention in F major, was recorded in the spring of 1967 on a Scully tape recorder at Gotham Recording Studios at 2 West 46th Street, where Carlos had brought Moog equipment for a commercial project.

According to Carlos, Switched-On Bach took approximately five months and one thousand hours to produce. As the Moog was monophonic, meaning that only one note could be played at a time, each track was assembled one note at a time: "You had to release the note before you could make the next note start, which meant you had to play with a detached feeling on the keyboard, which was really very disturbing in making music." The synthesizer often went out of tune; Carlos recalled hitting it with a hammer prior to recording to obtain correct levels. After several notes were played, it was checked again to make sure the tuning had not drifted.

Bach provided only the two chords of a Phrygian half cadence for the second movement of the Brandenburg Concerto No. 3, intending that the musicians would improvise on these chords. Carlos and Folkman carefully constructed this piece to showcase the capabilities of the Moog.

== Artwork ==
Switched-On Bach was released with two different covers. The most common features a man dressed as Bach standing before a Moog synthesizer. The first pressing featured the same man seated, as shown above, with no credit to Carlos on the front cover. Carlos and Elkind objected to this original cover and had it replaced, finding it "a clownish, trivializing image of a mugging Bach". They also objected to the fact that the synthesizer was incorrectly set up: "[The headphones] were plugged into the input, not output, of a 914 filter module, which in turn was connected to nothing, [assuring] that silence is all that would have greeted Johann Sebastian's ears."

== Release ==
In 1968, shortly before the release of Switched-On Bach, Robert Moog spoke at the annual Audio Engineering Society conference and played Carlos' rendition of the third movement of the Brandenburg Concerto No. 3 at the end of his talk. Moog recalled: "I walked off the stage and went to the back of the auditorium while people were listening, and I could feel it in the air. They were jumping out of their skins. These technical people were involved in so much flim-flam, so much shoddy, opportunistic stuff, and here was something that was just impeccably done and had obvious musical content and was totally innovative. The tape got a standing ovation."

Switched-On Bach was released in October 1968 by Columbia Masterworks. In 1969, it entered the top 40 on the US Billboard 200 before it reached a peak of No. 10 that year, for a total of 59 weeks on the chart. From January 1969 to January 1972, the album was No. 1 on the Billboard Classical Albums chart, and it reached the seventh position of the Canadian RPM album chart. In February 1974, Columbia estimated that 960,000 copies of the album had been sold in the US. In June that year, Billboard reported the album's sales surpassed one million, the second classical music record in history to achieve the feat. In August 1969, it was certified Gold by the Recording Industry Association of America, for sales in excess of 1 million copies. It reached Platinum certification in November 1986.

=== Reception ===
Professional ratings
Review scores
Source	Rating
Allmusic	3.5/5 stars

Switched-On Bach received negative reviews from some classical music traditionalists, but gained popularity among many younger listeners. In a retrospective review for AllMusic, Bruce Eder noted that Carlos' approach "was highly musical in ways that ordinary listeners could appreciate ... characterized by ... amazing sensitivity and finely wrought nuances, in timbre, tone, and expressiveness." Pianist Glenn Gould spoke highly of Switched-On Bach, calling it "one of the most startling achievements of the recording industry in this generation and certainly one of the great feats in the history of 'keyboard' performance." In 1972, Gould participated in the Columbia Records project Switched-Off Bach, which presented the same selection of works acoustically.

In 1970, the album won three Grammy Awards: Best Classical Album, Best Classical Performance – Instrumental Soloist or Soloists (With or Without Orchestra), and Best Engineered Classical Recording.

=== Influence ===
Following the album's success, Moog received an unprecedented number of inquiries from producers and artists. A number of other Moog synthesizer albums were released, such as Switched-On Rock by the Moog Machine, Music to Moog By by Gershon Kingsley, and The Moog Strikes Bach by Hans Wurman. Moog credited the album for demonstrating that synthesizers could be used for more than avant-garde music and sound effects. He said of the album's success:

CBS had no idea what they had in Switched-On Bach. When it came out, they lumped it in at a studio press party for Terry Riley's In C and an abysmal record called Rock and Other Four Letter Words. Carlos was angered by this, so he [sic] refused to come. So CBS, frantic to have some representation, asked me to demonstrate the synthesizer. I remember there was a nice big bowl of joints on top of the mixing console, and Terry Riley was there in his white Jesus suit, up on a pedestal, playing live on a Farfisa electronic organ against a backup of tape delays. Rock and Other Four Letter Words went on to sell a few thousand records. In C sold a few tens of thousands. Switched-On Bach sold over a million, and just keeps going on and on.

Giorgio Moroder credited Switched-On Bach with bringing synthesizers to his attention. Brian Wilson of the Beach Boys called it "one of the most electrifying albums I ever heard" and cited it as a major influence on the band's synthesizer-heavy 1977 album The Beach Boys Love You. It was inducted into the Library of Congress' National Recording Registry in 2005.

=== Reissues ===
In 1999, Switched-On Bach was remastered and included as part of the Switched-On Boxed Set, a four-CD box set also containing its successors The Well-Tempered Synthesizer, Switched-On Bach II, and Switched-On Brandenburgs. In 1992, Carlos released Switched-On Bach 2000, a re-recording using digital synthesizers and computer-assisted recording (with an added introductory composition styled as a birthday fanfare for the project), to commemorate the 25th anniversary of the album. In 2001, a remastered edition was released with a previously unreleased track, "Initial Experiments, demonstration". Carlos wrote: "You may rest assured that this is the best these recordings have ever sounded."

== Track listing ==
All tracks are written by Johann Sebastian Bach.

No.	Title	Length
1.	"Sinfonia to Cantata No. 29"	3:20
2.	"Air on a G String"	2:27
3.	"Two-Part Invention in F Major"	0:40
4.	"Two-Part Invention in B-Flat Major"	1:30
5.	"Two-Part Invention in D Minor"	0:55
6.	"Jesu, Joy of Man's Desiring"	2:56
7.	"Prelude and Fugue No. 7 in E-Flat Major" (from Book 1 of The Well-Tempered Clavier)	7:07

Side two

No.	Title	Length
1.	"Prelude and Fugue No. 2 in C Minor" (from Book 1 of The Well-Tempered Clavier)	2:43
2.	"Chorale Prelude 'Wachet Auf'"	3:37
3.	"Brandenburg Concerto No. 3 in G Major - First Movement"	6:35
4.	"Brandenburg Concerto No. 3 in G Major - Second Movement"	2:50
5.	"Brandenburg Concerto No. 3 in G Major - Third Movement"	5:05
Total length:		39:45

== Personnel ==
Credits adapted from the liner notes of Switched-On Bach.

- Wendy Carlos (originally credited as Walter Carlos) – Moog synthesizer, synthesizer programming
- Benjamin Folkman – supplementary keyboards
- Rachel Elkind – producer

== Charts ==
Chart performance for Switched-On Bach
Chart (1968–69)	Peak position
Canada Top 50 Albums (RPM)	7
German Albums (Offizielle Top 100)	22
US Top LP's (Billboard)	10
US Classical LP's (Billboard)	1

== Certifications and sales ==
Certifications for Switched-On Bach
Region	Certification	Certified units/sales
United States (RIAA)	Platinum	1,000,000^{^}
^{^} Shipments figures based on certification alone.
