= Wendy Carlos =

American composer and electronic musician (born 1939)

- Carlos in 1985

Background information
- Born: November 14, 1939 (age 87); Pawtucket, Rhode Island, U.S.
- Genres: Electronic; classical; ambient; jazz
- Occupations: Musician; composer; record producer
- Instruments: Keyboards; synthesizer; vocoder
- Years active: 1964–2005
- Labels: Columbia Masterworks; CBS; Audion; Telarc; East Side Digital
- Website: wendycarlos.com

Wendy Carlos (born Walter Carlos, November 14, 1939) is an American musician and composer known for electronic music and film scores.

Born and raised in Rhode Island, Carlos studied physics and music at Brown University before moving to New York City in 1962 to study music composition at Columbia University. Studying and working with various electronic musicians and technicians at the city's Columbia-Princeton Electronic Music Center, she helped in the development of the Moog synthesizer, Robert Moog's first commercially available keyboard instrument.

Carlos came to prominence with Switched-On Bach (1968), an album of music by Johann Sebastian Bach performed on a Moog synthesizer, which helped popularize its use in the 1970s and won her three Grammy Awards. Its commercial success led to several more albums, including further synthesized classical music adaptations, and experimental and ambient music. She composed the score to two Stanley Kubrick films, A Clockwork Orange (1971) and The Shining (1980), and for Tron (1982) for Walt Disney Productions.

In 1979, Carlos raised public awareness of transgender issues by disclosing she had been living as a woman since at least 1968, and in 1972 had undergone gender-affirming surgery.

== Early life ==
Carlos was born on November 14, 1939 in Pawtucket, Rhode Island, to working-class parents Clarence and Mary Carlos. Her parents married in 1937, and Carlos was the first of two children. Her mother played the piano and sang; one uncle played the trombone and another played the trumpet and drums. She began piano lessons at age six, and wrote her first composition, "A Trio for Clarinet, Accordion, and Piano", at age ten.

Carlos attended St. Raphael Academy, a Catholic high school in Pawtucket. In 1953, at fourteen, Carlos won a scholarship by building a computer presented at the Westinghouse Science Fair, a science competition for high-school students. From 1958 to 1962, Carlos studied at Brown University and graduated with a degree in music and physics, during which she taught informal lessons in electronic music.

== Career ==
=== 1960s ===
In 1965, Carlos graduated from Columbia University with a master's degree in music composition, and assisted Leonard Bernstein in presenting an evening of electronic music at the Philharmonic Hall. Carlos studied with Vladimir Ussachevsky and Otto Luening, two pioneers of electronic music in the 1960s. They were based in the Columbia–Princeton Electronic Music Center in New York City, the first of its kind in the United States. After Ussachevsky suggested to Carlos that she work in a recording studio to support herself, Carlos began working as a recording and mastering engineer at Gotham Recording Studios in New York City; she worked in this position until 1968. She called it "a really lovely occupation" and found it to be a useful learning experience.

During her time at Columbia, Carlos met Robert Moog at the 1964 Audio Engineering Society show, which began a partnership. Carlos ordered custom-designed synthesizer modules from Moog, and gave him extensive advice and technical assistance in the development of what became the Moog synthesizer, Moog's new electronic instrument. She convinced Moog to add a touch-sensitive keyboard for greater musical dynamics, among other improvements. Moog recounted that Carlos gave extensive and very detailed constructive criticism about his equipment, presenting him with suggestions for improvements to every module, including the shapes and dimensions of the cases. Moog credited Carlos with originating many features of his synthesizer, and that many features that became part of the final production model of the Moog synthesizer originated with the custom modules he created for her, including the touch-sensitive keyboard, a portamento control, a fixed filter bank, and a 49-oscillator polyphonic generator bank that could create chords and arpeggios.

By 1966 Carlos owned a small Moog synthesizer, which she used to record sound effects and jingles for television commercials, which earned her "anywhere from $100 to $1000". In 1967, Carlos met and befriended fellow Gotham Recorders employee Rachel Elkind, a former singer who had a jazz and musical theatre background and had worked as a secretary for Goddard Lieberson, then-president of Columbia Records. Although their initial meetings were somewhat confrontational (Elkind initially found Carlos "arrogant"), they eventually became friends and began sharing a home, studio, and business premises in a brownstone building in the West Side of Manhattan in New York City.

Carlos recorded several compositions in the 1960s as a student at the Columbia-Princeton Electronic Music Center. Two of them were re-recorded and released on By Request (1975), Dialogues for Piano and Two Loudspeakers (1963) and Episodes for Piano and Electronic Sound (1964), both featuring Phillip Ramey on piano. A third, Variations for Flute and Electronic Sounds (1964, featuring John Heiss on flute) was recorded and released in 1965 on a Turnabout Records "Electronic Music" compilation. Other known, but unreleased student compositions include "Episodes for Piano and Tape" (1964), "Pomposities for Narrator and Tape" (1965), and "Noah" (1965), a two-hour opera blending electronics with an orchestra. Carlos's first commercial release was Moog 900 Series – Electronic Music Systems (1967), an introduction to the technical aspects of the Moog synthesizer released as a nine-minute single-sided mono LP and narrated by Ed Stokes.

Part of her compensation for making the recording was in Moog equipment, and in part payment for her various other contributions to Moog's product development, and for articles she wrote for Moog's short-lived electronic music periodical, she was able to acquire additional Moog equipment at a discount, most of it custom-designed to her specific requirements. By the time Carlos began recording Switched-On Bach, she had built a home studio valued at around US$12,000 (approx. $111,000 in 2025) (although, given the unique nature of most of the modules, and their provenance, the 2025 value of her studio equipment would likely be far higher).

Her home studio, crucially, included an eight-track recorder that Carlos had built herself (because she was unable to afford a factory-made machine), using parts from Ampex and EMI recorders, with the addition of Ampex's patented "Sel-Sync" system, which enabled recorded signals to be monitored via the record head, rather than the playback head, thus permitting multiple tracks to be kept in perfect synchronisation. Carlos was also one of the earliest adopters of the Dolby noise reduction system, which she used for her final two-track masters.

==== Switched-On Bach ====
In 1968, Carlos released Switched-On Bach, an album formed of several pieces by Johann Sebastian Bach performed on a Moog modular synthesizer. Carlos had originally wanted to record an album of her own music, but Elkind suggested that they use music that was more familiar to the general listener in order to introduce the synthesizer as a credible new instrument. The idea for an album of Bach's music performed on the Moog began to crystallize during 1967, after Carlos asked Elkind to listen to some recordings by Carlos and musicologist Benjamin Folkman made up to ten years prior at the Electronic Music Center, one of them being Bach's Two-Part Invention in F major, which Elkind took a liking to. Plans for an album of several Bach compositions developed from there.

From her experience working in the music industry, Elkind knew that a major label would be unlikely to accept a pitch from a woman, so she approached her friend, the musician, conductor and producer Ettore Stratta, who was then a producer working in the A&R division at Columbia Records. He successfully pitched the project to the label on their behalf, leading to a two-album recording contract with Columbia Masterworks, a deal that lasted until 1986. Crucially, it gave Carlos and Elkind ownership of their recording masters, and Elkind was able to negotiate what she described as "a very nice royalty", possibly because the label did not have to invest a large sum up-front and did not expect the album to sell many copies.

Columbia had launched an album sales campaign named "Bach to Rock", though it had no album of Bach's works in a contemporary context in its catalogue. They were given a small advance from the label; Elkind recalled they were offered $1000, Carlos told an interviewer they were given about $2500, a relatively modest sum, given that the average recording budget for a major pop album at this time was about $10,000. Columbia granted Carlos and Elkind artistic freedom to produce and release the album. Carlos performs with additional synthesizers played by Folkman and with Elkind as producer.

The recording process was long and complex, because the monophonic Moog could only play one note at a time. Due to the limitations of her equipment, every instrumental part in each score had to be recorded separately, and then each successive part was layered over the previously recorded parts on Carlos's eight-track recorder. All the parts were coordinated by recording each one in time with a click track, which was eventually erased. Biographer Amanda Sewell reports that Carlos only rarely wrote down the complex combination of control knob settings and cable connections (or "patches") used to create specific sounds on the Moog, and that she was able to memorize and recall nearly her entire "library" of patches at will.

This tortuous recording process was made even more difficult by the tendency of the early Moog oscillators to drift out of tune—by her own account, Carlos was often only able to record one or two measures of each part before the Moog went out of tune, and she claimed she sometimes even had to bang on the casing with a hammer to get it back into tune. This issue also meant that she had to meticulously review each segment for consistency once it had been recorded, because if one line was out of tune the entire section would be ruined.

Carlos later recalled that she worked on the recording of the album for eight hours a day, five days a week, for five months, on top of her regular full-time day job at Gotham Studios. Although Switched-On Bach was extremely costly in terms of person-hours expended, her high-quality home studio, her proficiency as a programmer and performer on the Moog, and her ability as a recording engineer enabled Carlos and her colleagues to record and produce the album completely independently, thereby avoiding the need to use expensive commercial recording studios. As well as the consideration that repeatedly taking the bulky, complex and delicate Moog system to and from a studio for each session would have been almost impossible, given Carlos's own reckoning that the project took over 1100 hours to complete, using commercial studios would have made the recording prohibitively expensive, and would likely have cost upwards of US$100,000 in 1968. By comparison, The Beatles' 1967 album Sgt. Pepper's Lonely Hearts Club Band took over 700 hours to record and cost a reported UK£25,000, or about US$60,000 at the 1968 exchange rate. Additionally, although the recording was extremely labour-intensive, the combination of the Moog and the multitrack recorder gave Carlos and Elkind unprecedented control over every facet of the timbral, expressive and environmental qualities of every single note they recorded, enabling them to create a new level of clarity for each "voice" in the compositions—a key concern for Elkind, who was critical of what she called the "soggy" audio quality of contemporary classical recordings.

Released in October 1968, Switched-On Bach became an unexpected commercial and critical hit, with Glenn Gould calling it "the album of the decade", and it helped to draw attention to the synthesizer as a genuine musical instrument. A Canadian Broadcasting Corporation program in November 1968, called CBC AM, secured a rare interview with Carlos about the selection and use of Moog. As biographer Amanda Sewell observes, it is notable that Carlos is not pictured anywhere on the album, and is only mentioned by name (as Walter Carlos) in the rear sleeve notes of the original cover. Newsweek dedicated a full page to Carlos with the caption "Plugging into the Steinway of the future". It peaked at No. 10 on the US Billboard 200 chart and was No. 1 on its Classical Albums chart from January 1969 to January 1972. It was the second classical album to sell over one million copies and was certified Gold in 1969 and Platinum in 1986 by the Recording Industry Association of America. Carlos performed selections from the album on stage with a synthesizer with the St. Louis Symphony Orchestra.

The massive and unexpected success of Switched-On Bach put great pressure on Carlos. She was by this time well into her gender confirmation process, and she was fearful of both personal ridicule and physical attack, and of the negative impact that her status as a transitioning person could have on her music career. Biographer Amanda Sewell records that the St. Louis appearance was extremely difficult for her—she hated having to disguise herself as Walter, for which she had to affect a deeper voice, use makeup to simulate a five o'clock shadow, and don a wig and pasted-on fake sideburns. Her childhood experiences of being bullied and assaulted made her so fearful of appearing in public that she reportedly even contemplated taking her own life before the event and cried all the way to St. Louis. This was to be one of only two live performances Carlos made following her days as a student, the other being with the Kurzweil Baroque Ensemble for "Bach at the Beacon" in 1997.

In 1970, the album won a Grammy Award for Best Classical Album, Best Classical Performance – Instrumental Soloist or Soloists (With or Without Orchestra), and Best Engineered Classical Recording. Carlos released a follow-up, The Well-Tempered Synthesizer, with synthesized pieces from multiple composers. Released in November 1969, the album reached No. 199 on the Billboard 200 and received two Grammy nominations. The success of both albums allowed Carlos to move into Elkind's more spacious New York City home in 1971.

Carlos considers Elkind's contribution to her work, and specifically Switched-On Bach, to be underappreciated, calling her "a 'silent' partner" and her work "critical to my success".

=== 1970s ===
After the release of Switched-On Bach, Carlos was invited to compose the soundtrack of two science fiction films, Marooned (1969), directed by John Sturges, and A Clockwork Orange (1971), directed by Stanley Kubrick. When the directors of Marooned changed their minds about including a soundtrack, Carlos chose to work with Kubrick, as she and Elkind were fans of his previous films, adding: "We finally wound up talking with someone who had a close connection to Stanley Kubrick's lawyer. We suddenly got an invitation to fly to London." Before Carlos knew about the offer, she read the book and began writing a piece based on it named "Timesteps". A soundtrack containing only the film cuts of the score was released as Stanley Kubrick's Clockwork Orange in 1972, combining synthesized and classical music by Henry Purcell, Beethoven and Gioacchino Rossini with an early use of a vocoder. Later that year, Carlos released an album of music not included in the final score titled Walter Carlos' Clockwork Orange, which peaked on the Billboard 200 chart at No. 146. Carlos later described the project as "a lot of fun ... a pleasurable venture".

Carlos experimented with ambient music on her third studio album, Sonic Seasonings, released as a double album in 1972, with one side-long track dedicated to each of the four seasons. Recorded as early as 1970 and finished in mid-1971, before the A Clockwork Orange project was complete, Carlos wished to produce music that did not require "lengthy concentrated listening", but more than a collection of ambient noises to portray an environment. It combined field recordings of animals and nature with synthesized sounds, occasionally employing melodies, to create soundscapes. It reached No. 168 in the Billboard 200 and influenced other artists who went on to pursue the ambient and new-age genres in later years.

By 1973, Columbia/CBS Records had received a considerable number of requests for Carlos to produce another album of synthesized classical music. She agreed to the request, opting to produce a sequel to Switched-On Bach, which began with her and Elkind seeking compositions that were most suitable for the synthesizer; the two picked selections from Suite No. 2 in B minor, Two-Part Inventions in A minor and major, Suite from Notebook for Anna Magdalena Bach, and Brandenburg Concerto No. 5 in D major. The latter features a Yamaha E-5 Electone organ for certain passages, as a reliable polyphonic keyboard had not been developed. The result, Switched-On Bach II, was released in 1973 and sold over 70,000 copies in the US during the first five weeks of its release.

Following Switched-On Bach II, Carlos changed musical directions once more. In 1971, she and Elkind had asked Columbia Records to attach a pre-paid business reply card in each new pressing of her albums, which resulted in a considerable amount of suggestions from the public regarding the subject of her future releases. The ideas received were divided; some asked for more classical adaptations, while others wanted more of Carlos's original compositions. Carlos decided, "If I was going to spend months for mere minutes of music, I certainly wasn't going to be pigeonholed into only retreading existing music", and so began a process of "re-directing new ideas, reworking old ones". By mid-1974, Carlos and Elkind had selected tracks of varying styles to record on the Moog synthesizer, which Carlos found liberating, as it demonstrated the flexibility of the instrument. Released as By Request in 1975, the album includes pieces from Bach, Wagner, Tchaikovsky, two of Carlos's compositions from the 1960s, and renditions of "Eleanor Rigby" by The Beatles and "What's New Pussycat?", originally sung by Tom Jones. The latter track, featuring some 40 tracks of overdubbed synthesiser, was one of the pieces that Carlos had unsuccessfully presented to Elkind in 1967 when they were planning what became Switched-On Bach. The final track, entitled "Pompous Circumstances", a "witty and serious" set of variations based on themes by Edward Elgar (see "Pomp and Circumstance"), was replaced by CBS with tracks from The Well-Tempered Synthesizer on UK pressings after members of Elgar's estate refused to have his music presented in this style, which "devastated" Carlos. Between 1974 and 1980 she scored several short films for producer Dick Young for UNICEF (seven of which were released in 2005 on Rediscovering Lost Scores, Vol.1).

By Request was followed by Switched-On Brandenburgs, a double album containing all six of Bach's Brandenburg Concertos played on a synthesizer, in 1980.

=== 1980s ===
Carlos reunited with Kubrick to compose the score for his psychological horror film The Shining (1980). Before filming began, Carlos and Elkind read the book, as per Kubrick's suggestion, for musical inspiration. Carlos recorded a complete electronic score for the film, but Kubrick ended up using mostly existing recordings by several avant-garde composers, tracks that he had used as guide tracks during editing. Carlos and Elkind did not discover this until they were invited to a screening of the film in May 1980, and they were reportedly furious about Kubrick's actions. Their experience closely mirrored that of composer Alex North, who had written and recorded a complete orchestral soundtrack for Kubrick's 2001: A Space Odyssey, but discovered at the film's world premiere that Kubrick had jettisoned the entire score in favour of the guide tracks he had used while editing the movie.

The Shining (Original Motion Picture Soundtrack), released in 1980 on Warner Bros. Records, featured only two tracks credited to Carlos and Elkind: the main title theme and "Rocky Mountains", the former a reinterpretation of the "Dies Irae" section of Symphonie fantastique by Hector Berlioz. Biographer Amanda Sewell discovered that Carlos and Elkind's agent Lucy Kroll had written a note in her files indicating that the duo had initially considered suing Kubrick, but Sewell found that, several pages further on, Kroll had written another note that read "No signed contract"—Carlos and Elkind had made the deal with Kubrick "on a handshake", and thus had no legal recourse. Some of Carlos's music had some legal issues regarding its release, but much of it was made available in 2005 as part of her two-volume compilation album Rediscovering Lost Scores.

With work on The Shining complete, Elkind ended her long-time collaboration with Carlos when she moved to France with her husband in 1980. Carlos remained in New York City, sharing a converted loft in Greenwich Village with her new business partner Annemarie Franklin. It housed her new, remodeled studio, which was enclosed in a Faraday cage to shield the equipment from interference by radio, television and AC power-line signals.

Carlos's first project with Franklin began around 1980, when The Walt Disney Company asked her to record the soundtrack to its science fiction feature Tron (1982). Carlos agreed, but was not interested in composing solely with electronic music, as she wished to incorporate an orchestra with her musical ideas. She recalled their demands were "tightly specified ... there wasn't a lot of elbow room, and that made it fun". The score incorporated Carlos's analog and digital synthesizers with the London Philharmonic Orchestra, the UCLA Chorus, and the Royal Albert Hall Organ. Tron: Original Motion Picture Soundtrack was released in 1982 and reached No. 135 on the Billboard 200. Carlos intended to release her scores on her own album, but Columbia/CBS showed a lack of interest in the prospect.

Three studio albums from Carlos were released in the 1980s. The first was Digital Moonscapes in 1984, Carlos's first to only feature digital synthesizers. She wrote the album's tracks for orchestra "or orchestra replica", inspired by various astronomical subjects, which used some leftover material from her score to Tron. Soon after, Carlos secured a deal with Audion Records, a smaller label, as she wished to "get away from that kind of big, monolithic government-like aspect that [she] had dealt with for so many years". In 1986, Audion released Beauty in the Beast, which saw Carlos experiment with just intonation, Balinese scales, and four new microtonal scales she devised for the album: harmonic, alpha, beta, and gamma. The album features the first instance of a 35-note octave. Carlos considers the album the most important of her career. She followed the album with Secrets of Synthesis in 1987, her final album for CBS/Columbia, featuring several introductions and demonstrations of synthesized music from Carlos with audio examples from her previous albums.

In 1988, CBS Records asked Carlos to collaborate with comical musician "Weird Al" Yankovic to release a parody of Peter and the Wolf by Sergei Prokofiev. Carlos agreed to the project, as she felt it presented a chance "to let your sense of humor out of the cage". Yankovic adapted and narrated its story, while Carlos rearranged the music with a "MIDI orchestra", her first venture using the digital interface. The album's second side also contains a humorous adaptation of The Carnival of the Animals by Camille Saint-Saëns titled "The Carnival of the Animals—Part II", with Yankovic providing funny poems for each of the featured animals in the style of poet Ogden Nash, who did similar for the original. Released in October 1988, Peter and the Wolf/Carnival of the Animals—Part II was nominated for a Grammy Award for Best Album for Children in 1989.

=== 1990s–2000s ===
To mark the 25th anniversary of Switched-On Bach, Carlos re-recorded the album with her set of digital instruments and recording techniques. Released in 1992 on Telarc Records, Switched-On Bach 2000 took roughly one and a half years to produce; Carlos estimated around 3,000 hours were invested in the project, which involved using several digital audio workstation software packages, including Pro Tools. A Moog synthesizer is only used once on the record; the rest is performed on 13 modern synthesizers. The album also marked her first venture into mixing in Dolby Surround sound.

Carlos wrote the soundtrack to the British film Brand New World (1998), also known as Woundings, directed by Roberta Hanley and based on a play by Jeff Noon. Carlos explained the style of her music: "I was given fairly large carte blanche to do some horrific things and also some inside-psyche mood paintings, and that's what the film became."

In 1998, Carlos released her most recent studio album, Tales from Heaven and Hell, for the East Side Digital label.

Beginning in 1998, Carlos digitally remastered her studio albums, culminating in the Switched-On Box Set released in 1999 featuring her four synthesized classical albums.

In 2005, the two-volume set Rediscovering Lost Scores was released, featuring previously out-of-print material, including the unreleased soundtrack to Woundings and music recorded for A Clockwork Orange, The Shining, and Tron that was not used in the films.

== Personal life ==
=== Gender transition ===
Carlos became aware of her gender dysphoria at an early age, recalling: "I was about five or six ... I remember being convinced I was a little girl, much preferring long hair and girls' clothes, and not knowing why my parents didn't see it clearly". While at Brown University, she went on a date with a girl and felt "so jealous of her I was beside myself".

Sometime after entering graduate school at Columbia University in the fall of 1962, she encountered studies of transgender issues for the first time, which explained to her what she was feeling. In the summer of 1966, New York sexologist Harry Benjamin published his landmark book The Transsexual Phenomenon describing and explaining the affirmative treatment path he pioneered. In the fall of 1967, Carlos began counseling with him (well before Switched-On Bach).

By early 1968, Carlos had begun hormone replacement treatment under Benjamin's care, which began altering her appearance. That created some problems for Carlos when Switched-On Bach became an unexpected hit after its release in October 1968.

Prior to a live performance of excerpts from the album with the St. Louis Symphony Orchestra, Carlos was apprehensive about appearing in public. She put on fake sideburns and a man's wig, and drew on facial hair with an eyebrow pencil to appear more masculine. She did the same thing again when she met Kubrick, and for an appearance on The Dick Cavett Show in 1970.

Finally, the commercial success of Switched-On Bach allowed Carlos the funds to undergo feminizing surgery in May 1972, although for marketing reasons she released two more albums as Walter Carlos (1973's Switched-On Bach II and 1975's By Request).

Carlos disclosed her transgender status in a series of interviews with Arthur Bell held between December 1978 and January 1979, published in the May 1979 issue of Playboy magazine. She explained in Playboy that she had "always been concerned with liberation, and [I was] anxious to liberate myself". In 1985, Carlos spoke about the reaction to her transition: "The public turned out to be amazingly tolerant or, if you wish, indifferent ... There had never been any need of this charade to have taken place. It had proven a monstrous waste of years of my life."

The first album released after the Playboy interview, Switched-On Brandenburgs (1980), and all subsequent releases and re-releases, have been issued under the name Wendy Carlos.

=== Lawsuit ===
In 1998, Carlos sued the songwriter/artist Momus for $22 million regarding the song "Walter Carlos" (from the album The Little Red Songbook, released that year), which postulated that after the gender-affirming surgery Wendy could travel back in time to marry her pre-transition self. The case was settled out of court, with Momus agreeing to remove the song from subsequent editions of the CD and owing $30,000 in legal fees.

=== Published biography ===
A biography by musicologist Amanda Sewell, Wendy Carlos: A Biography, was published by Oxford University Press in 2020. It relies entirely on published publicly available sources, since the author was unable to secure an interview with Carlos or anyone close to her. Despite this limitation it was positively reviewed by critics. On her personal website, Carlos describes the work as "fiction" that mischaracterizes her life and deceased parents.

== Awards and honors ==
Switched-On Bach was the winner of three Grammy Awards at the 1970 ceremony:

- Album of the Year, Classical
- Best Classical Performance – Instrumental Soloist Or Soloists (With Or Without Orchestra)
- Best Engineered Recording, Classical

Carlos received three additional nominations for Best Classical Performance – Instrumental Soloist Or Soloists (With Or Without Orchestra) and Best Engineered Recording, Classical for The Well-Tempered Synthesizer, and Best Recording for Children for Peter And The Wolf/Carnival Of The Animals (Part II).

In 2005, Carlos was the recipient of the SEAMUS Lifetime Achievement Award "in recognition of lifetime achievement and contribution to the art and craft of electro-acoustic music" by the Society for Electro-Acoustic Music in the United States.

Carlos is the first transgender recipient of a Grammy Award.

== Other activities ==
Carlos contributed a review of the then-available synthesizers to the June 1971 edition of the Whole Earth Catalog, contrasting the Moog, Buchla and Tonus (a.k.a. ARP) systems. She was dismissive of smaller systems like the EMS Putney and the Minimoog as "toys" and "cash-ins".

Carlos is also an accomplished solar eclipse photographer. Her work has been published online by NASA and has appeared on the cover of Sky & Telescope. She has developed various techniques for the extension of dynamic range in eclipse photography by the use of darkroom techniques and digital composites.

In addition, Carlos' hobbies include creating map projections, most notably a novel type of conformal map.

== Discography ==
=== Studio albums ===
- Switched-On Bach (Columbia Masterworks, 1968)
- The Well-Tempered Synthesizer (Columbia Masterworks, 1969)
- Sonic Seasonings (Columbia, 1972)
- Walter Carlos's Clockwork Orange (CBS, 1972; reissued in 1998 as A Clockwork Orange: Wendy Carlos's Complete Original Score)
- Switched-On Bach II (Columbia Masterworks, 1973)
- By Request (Columbia Masterworks, 1975)
- Switched-On Brandenburgs (Columbia Masterworks, 1980)
- Digital Moonscapes (Columbia Masterworks, 1984)
- Beauty in the Beast (Audion, 1986)
- Secrets of Synthesis (CBS, 1987)
- Peter & the Wolf (CBS, 1988; with "Weird Al" Yankovic)
- Switched-On Bach 2000 (Telarc, 1992)
- Tales of Heaven and Hell (East Side Digital, 1998)

=== Soundtracks ===
- A Clockwork Orange (Columbia, 1971)
- The Shining (Warner Bros., 1980)
- Tron (CBS, 1982)
- Rediscovering Lost Scores, Volume 1 (2005; compiles previously unreleased music from The Shining, A Clockwork Orange and several UNICEF films)
- Rediscovering Lost Scores, Volume 2 (2005; compiles previously unreleased music from The Shining, Tron, Split Second, Woundings and two Dolby demonstration tracks)

=== Compilations ===
- Switched-On Brandenburgs, Vol. I (1987; comprises the first LP of Switched-On Brandenburgs (1979) and selections from Switched-On Bach II (1973))
- Switched-On Brandenburgs, Vol. II (1987; comprises the second LP of Switched-On Brandenburgs (1979), selections from Switched-On Bach II (1973), and Bach's "Little" Fugue in G minor, BWV 578 from By Request (1975))
- Switched-On Boxed Set (1999; compiles Switched-On Bach, The Well-Tempered Synthesizer, Switched-On Bach II and Switched-On Brandenburgs)

=== Appears on ===
- Electronic Music (1967) from Vox Turnabout. Includes two Carlos compositions "Dialogues for Piano and Two Loudspeakers" (with Phillip Ramey, pianist) and "Variations for Flute and Tape" (with John Heiss, flutist)
- Moog 900 Series – Electronic Music Systems (1967) demonstration disc of the capabilities of the first commercially available Moog synthesizer
- Childe Harold – "Brink of Death" / "Anne, With Love" (single, 1968, Limelight Records)

== See also ==
- List of ambient music artists
