= Rachel Elkind-Tourre =

American musician and producer (born 1939)

Rachel Elkind-Tourre (née Elkind; born February 23, 1939) is an American classical musician, record producer and composer. She produced the work of Wendy Carlos, most notably the bestselling 1968 album Switched-On Bach.

== Career ==
Elkind worked closely with Carlos from 1967 to 1980, when she moved to France with her husband, Yves Tourre. Carlos considers Elkind's contribution to her work underappreciated, calling her "a 'silent' partner" and her work "critical to my success". Elkind's singing voice was processed via a vocoder on several Carlos recordings. She is also credited as co-composer for The Shining film score. She also produced the album One Voice Many by the rock band Michaelangelo in 1971 for Columbia Records.
