= Claude Vivier =

Canadian composer (1948–1983)

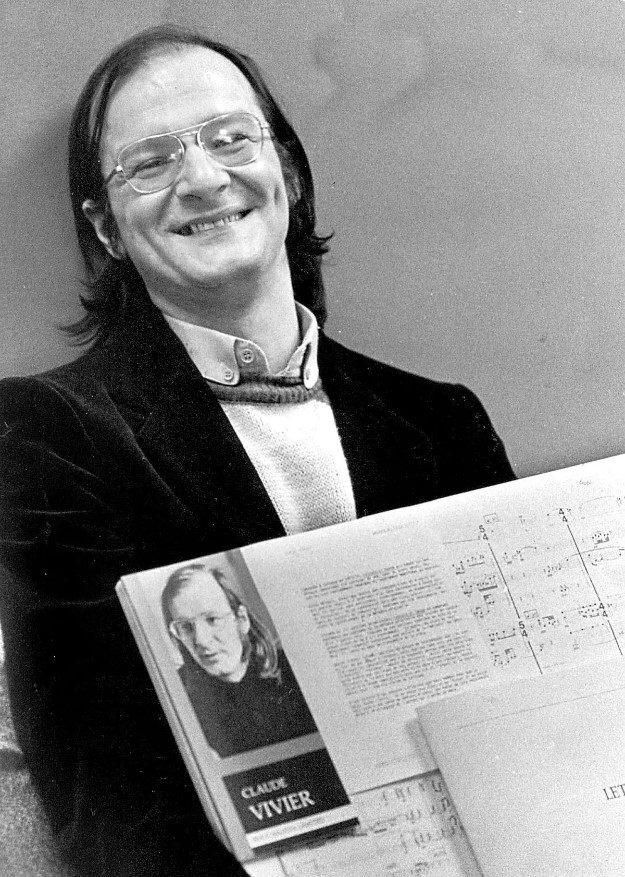
- Vivier in 1980
- Born: 14 April 1948 (in or near) Montreal, Quebec, Canada (Note: It is impossible to know exactly where he was born, as his mother gave no information before submitting him to the Montreal orphanage, but it is more likely than not for Vivier to have been born in or around the Montreal metro area.)
- Died: 7 March 1983 (aged 34); Paris, France
- Cause of death: Murder by stabbing
- Education: Conservatoire de musique du Québec à Montréal (1967–1971) Internationales Musikinstitut Darmstadt (1972–1974)
- Occupations: Composer; pianist; poet; ethnomusicologist
- Notable work: Siddhartha (1976); Kopernikus (1979); Zipangu (1980); Lonely Child (1980)
- Partner: Christopher Coe (1982–1983)

Signature
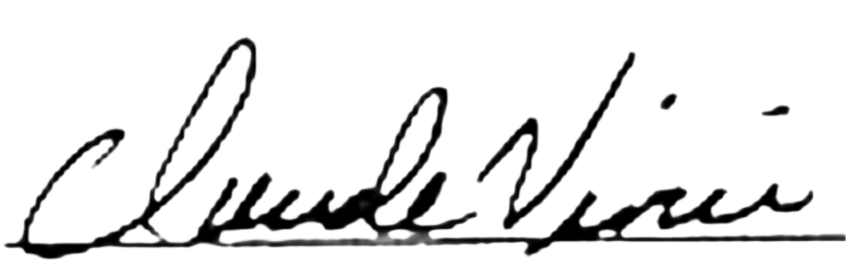

Claude Vivier (French: [klod 'vivje] VEEV-yay; baptised as Claude Roger; 14 April 1948 – 7 March 1983 (Note: Vivier was killed during the night of 7–8 March 1983, but sources disagree on the exact time of death.)) was a Canadian composer, pianist, poet and ethnomusicologist of Québécois origin. He is considered to be among the greatest Canadian composers.

After studying with Karlheinz Stockhausen in Cologne, Vivier became an innovative member of the "German Feedback" movement, a subset of what is now known as spectral music. Between 1976 and 1977, Vivier travelled to Egypt, Japan, Iran, Thailand, Singapore, and Bali, where he came under the influence of aspects of their respective traditional musics.

Vivier worked at a slow pace and left a small but diverse œuvre. His place in the spectral movement entailed the manipulation of the harmonic series and combination tones; he used microtonality to replicate these frequencies, developing a compositional technique he termed jeux de couleurs. He is also known for incorporating elements of serialism and musique concrète, extended techniques, surrealism, and Québécois folk songs. Thematically, Vivier's pieces are largely seen as autobiographical; they explore loneliness and ostracization, the search for love and companionship, and travel. He used his personal experiences to advance an avant-garde style, having written multilingual vocal music and devising langues inventées (invented languages). György Ligeti would revere Vivier as "the most important and original composer of his generation."

Vivier was openly gay. After ending his brief relationship with American writer Christopher Coe, he frequented Parisian gay bars where he solicited male prostitutes, one of whom violently attacked him in January 1983. Despite warnings from friends and his own increasing paranoia over his safety, Vivier had continued to engage in the same behaviour. On the night of 7–8 March, he was killed by a serial murderer who routinely deceived gay men in the Marais to rob and assault them.

== Early life ==
=== Childhood ===
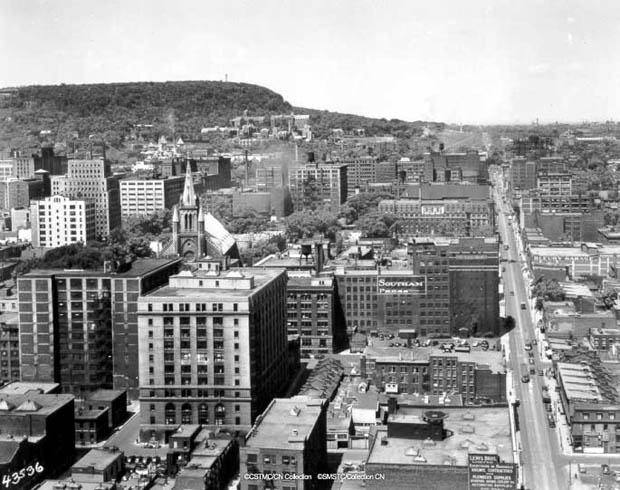
View of central Montreal in the 1940s, where Vivier grew up

Claude Vivier is believed to have been born on 14 April 1948 in or near Montréal, Québec, and was voluntarily placed in the orphanage of La Crèche Saint-Michel (no longer in operation) that same day by his mother. The name, ethnicity, and origin of his biological parents are unknown.

Vivier himself would posit in later years that he was likely not of French Canadian heritage. He would often mythicize the story and heritage of his parents, at times telling people his family was German, Eastern European, or Jewish. His friend Philippe Poloni would relay: "he thought that his father was a conductor, or his mother was a musician, and they met in Montréal. Or something like that, something very romantic. He always said he spoke good German and good Italian because he had a natural connection with those two languages as he had some Italian and some Jewish German blood in his veins". He searched his whole life in the hope of finding his birth parents, to no avail. This frustration and the feeling of a hollow identity inspired many of his works, including Lonely Child (1980).

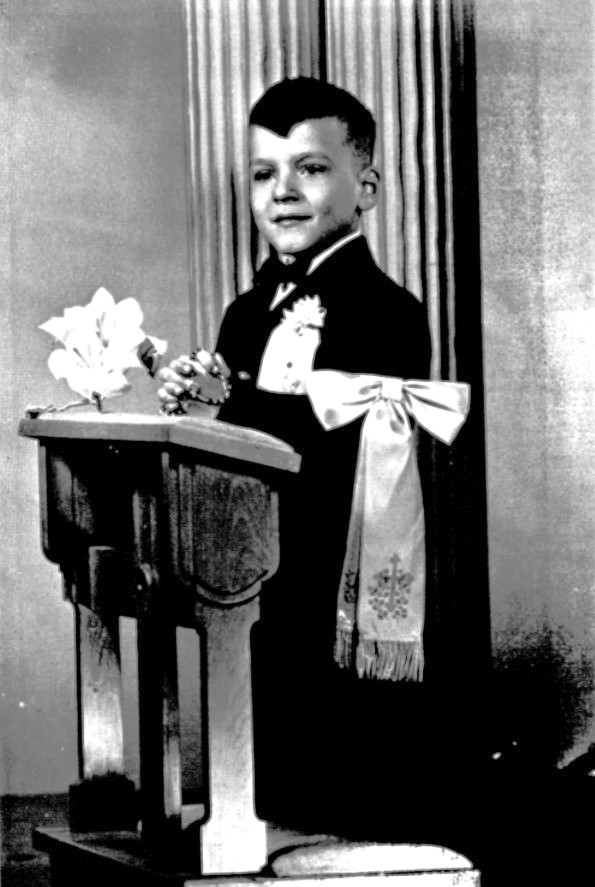
A young Vivier at his First Communion, c. mid 1950s

After receiving the young boy, the Sœurs Grises who ran the orphanage gave him the name of Claude Roger, and he was subsequently baptized at the Église Saint-Enfant-Jésus. He was considered mentally disabled, as the nuns believed him to be "deaf and dumb." Apart from this, however, very little is known from his early life in the orphanage due to a lack of record-keeping; any learning disability that he may have had, went undiagnosed.

He was adopted at the age of two and a half by the working-class Vivier family of Mile End, Montréal, consisting of parents Armand and Jeanne (née Masseau) and their two biological children. The couple had suffered a miscarriage many years prior and were looking for a young girl to adopt, only to find each of the Montréal orphanages having solely boys. It is unknown why Claude was chosen out of the many in Saint-Michel. He was a charismatic and excitable child, but his time in the large and strictly Catholic Vivier household was fraught with incidents. He is reported to have learned to speak at the age of six, before which the family had considered sending him to a mental institution. After Christmas in 1950, Claude was briefly brought back to the orphanage by his adoptive family for unspecified reasons, but was taken back in August 1951.

At the age of eight, Vivier was raped by his adoptive uncle, Joseph. He revealed this to a priest during a routine confession, and the priest reportedly told the young Claude that he would not be forgiven unless he told his parents. Vivier's parents became infuriated after he eventually recounted the sexual assault, believing he was either lying or responsible for the incident. This caused a significant strain in their relationship, and Vivier would ultimately spend less and less time interacting with his family. Despite this, Joseph's sexual abuse continued for years after. The family moved north to the suburb of Laval when Vivier was nine or ten, and frequently migrated from house to house as they continued to struggle financially. These near-constant moves depressed Vivier and he became ever more lonely: "I remember when I was a child and we moved house – I went around the streets looking for friends, but came back to the house with my head down, still with no friends".

==== Adolescence ====
We lived two streets away from [Claude]. I remember we heard him singing very loudly when he passed by on the pavement in front of our house. I was in service at Mass with him. Young people made fun of him because he was so out of the ordinary. He already had effeminate manners, laughed loudly and behaved strangely. But he was unreachable. Nothing seemed to affect him. Even when people were making fun of him he just started over again the following day. You would notice him. He wasn't the type to pass by unnoticed.

— Unidentified Pont-Viau neighbour of the Vivier family, 1996

At the age of thirteen, Vivier's parents enrolled him in the boarding schools run by the Frères Maristae, a French Catholic organisation that prepared young men for the priesthood. Vivier recalled poetry being his favourite course, being especially fascinated with the works of the French poet Arthur Rimbaud and the Canadian poet Émile Nelligan. He also developed a strong interest in linguistics and historical literature, studying the mechanics of ancient Greek and Latin, which would later prove influential for his langue inventées. His relatively high grades let him rise to the ranks of church postulant, and he began to develop a group of friends with similar interests. His grades were ranked the highest in a class of thirty-four at the Juvénat Supérieur Saint-Joseph, with a two-year average exam mark of eighty per cent. Vivier's first documented poems, including Noël and the dada-inspired Not' petit bonheur (1965), date from this period.

Vivier discovered he was gay while attending classes and experiencing what he called "l'amour-amitié" towards his male classmates. In 1966, aged 18, he had already come out to his friends and family during a time when homosexuality was still illegal and heavily frowned upon in Canada. He was subsequently expelled from the novitiate of Saint-Hyacinthe halfway through the school year, with the official reason given by the Frères Maristae being his "inappropriate behaviour" and a "lack of maturity"; it is generally accepted by music historians that antipathy towards his homosexuality was their true motivation. Vivier reportedly sobbed for hours after receiving his notice of expulsion, having believed his time with the Frères Maristae to be the only time he was ever truly happy. He would, however, make no attempt to hide his sexuality from then onward.

=== First musical education ===
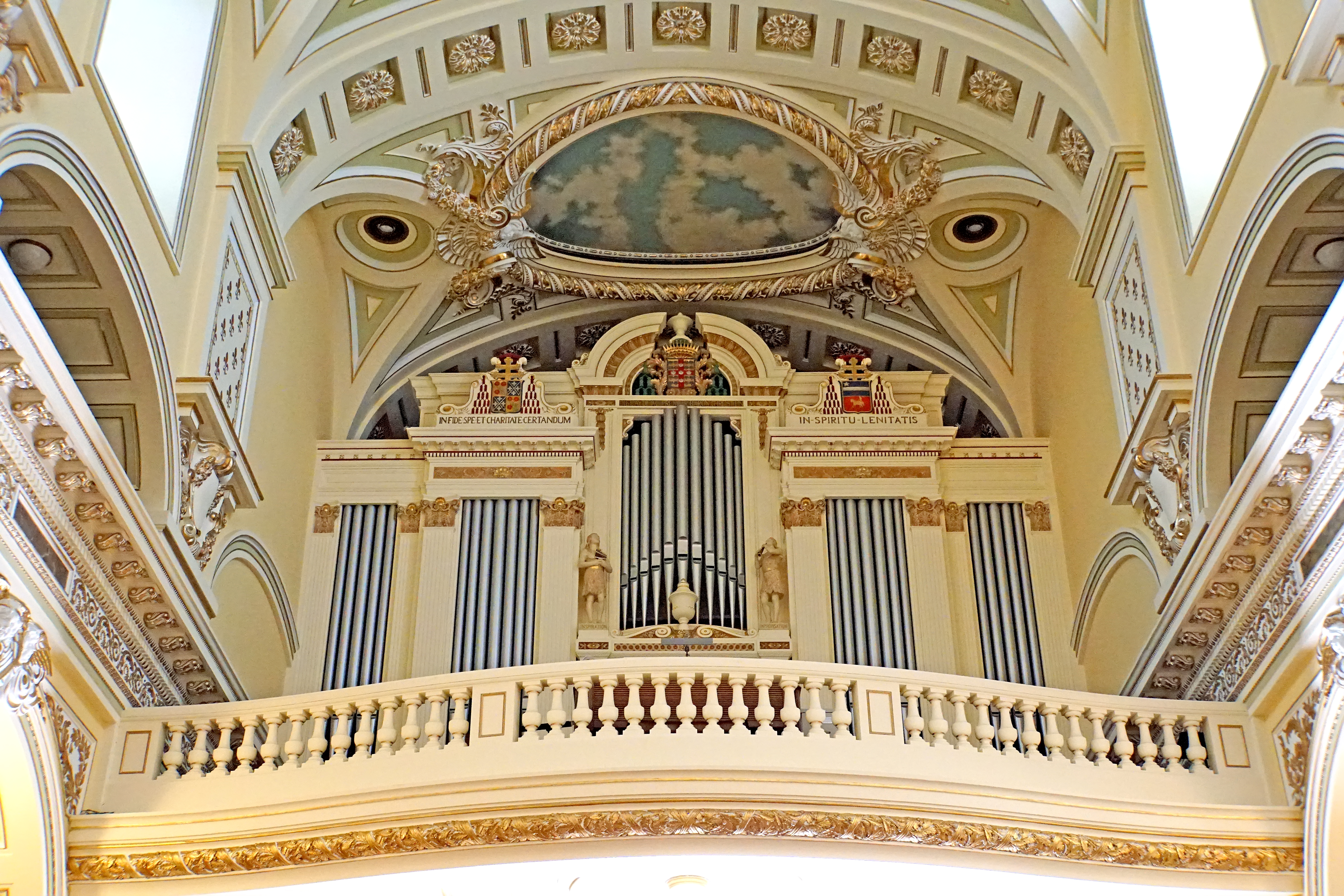
The organ in the Cathedral-Basilica of Notre-Dame de Québec, where Vivier would occasionally perform as a teenager

Vivier's first exposure to music was through singing hymns in the family's church during mass; he would later recall an experience in a midnight Mass on Christmas Eve as a "revelation." His adoptive parents purchased an upright piano and helped provide him occasional piano lessons when he was fourteen. His earliest known works date from this period, and he began to profit from his music around the same time: according to his adoptive sister Gisèle, he gave music lessons to his peers and played piano accompaniment for the ballet school in nearby Ahuntsic throughout his early teens. He also developed an interest in the organ, searching for various churches in the Pont-Viau neighbourhood where he could practice and perform. As he didn't receive much if any musical education from the Frères Maristae, he was almost entirely self-taught. One of his schoolmates, Gilles Beauregard, recalled his fascination with playing and studying the works of Mozart, Tchaikovsky, Bartók and Schoenberg. Vivier is believed to have written a handful of songs for voice and piano as well as several organ preludes before the age of twenty, nearly all of which have since been lost or destroyed. Vivier's friend Michel-Georges Brégent recalled a Bartók-inspired Prélude pour piano being written in 1967, but it was apparently destroyed by Vivier at a later time.

Despite being a devout Catholic himself, Vivier eventually decided a career in the church would be impossible given his prior expulsion. He worked various odd jobs to stay afloat financially after leaving the novitiate, including positions at a hardware store, an Eaton's, and a restaurant in the Laval area. In the fall of 1967, he was finally able to enroll at the Conservatoire de musique du Québec à Montréal (CMQM).

He studied piano with Irving Heller, harmony and counterpoint with Isabelle Delorme, fugue with Françoise Aubut-Pratte, and composition with Gilles Tremblay. Vivier was one of Tremblay's more enthusiastic and dedicated pupils, with Tremblay recalling: "He was eager to know. He was so eager to know that he was sometimes very tiring, because he would follow me in the corridors after the lessons and ask me questions". Tremblay, a pupil of Olivier Messiaen, refused to focus on specific historical periods and styles of music, believing the concept of music composition was all-encompassing. He analyzed contrasting genres with his students, including Gregorian chant, and the music of Johannes Sebastian Bach and Alban Berg. This unique outlook for the time inspired Vivier's future style in combining disparate influences. His Quatuor à cordes (1968), Ojikawa (1968) and Prolifération (1969, rev. 1976) are among the few works he completed at the conservatory. Tremblay would come to support Vivier and elevate his status as a serious composer, and the two developed a close friendship.

Vivier began his first known romantic relationship in Montréal with a man named Dino Olivieri. A postcard from this period to Olivieri reads, "Perhaps, I love you very much".

== Career ==
=== Studies in Europe ===
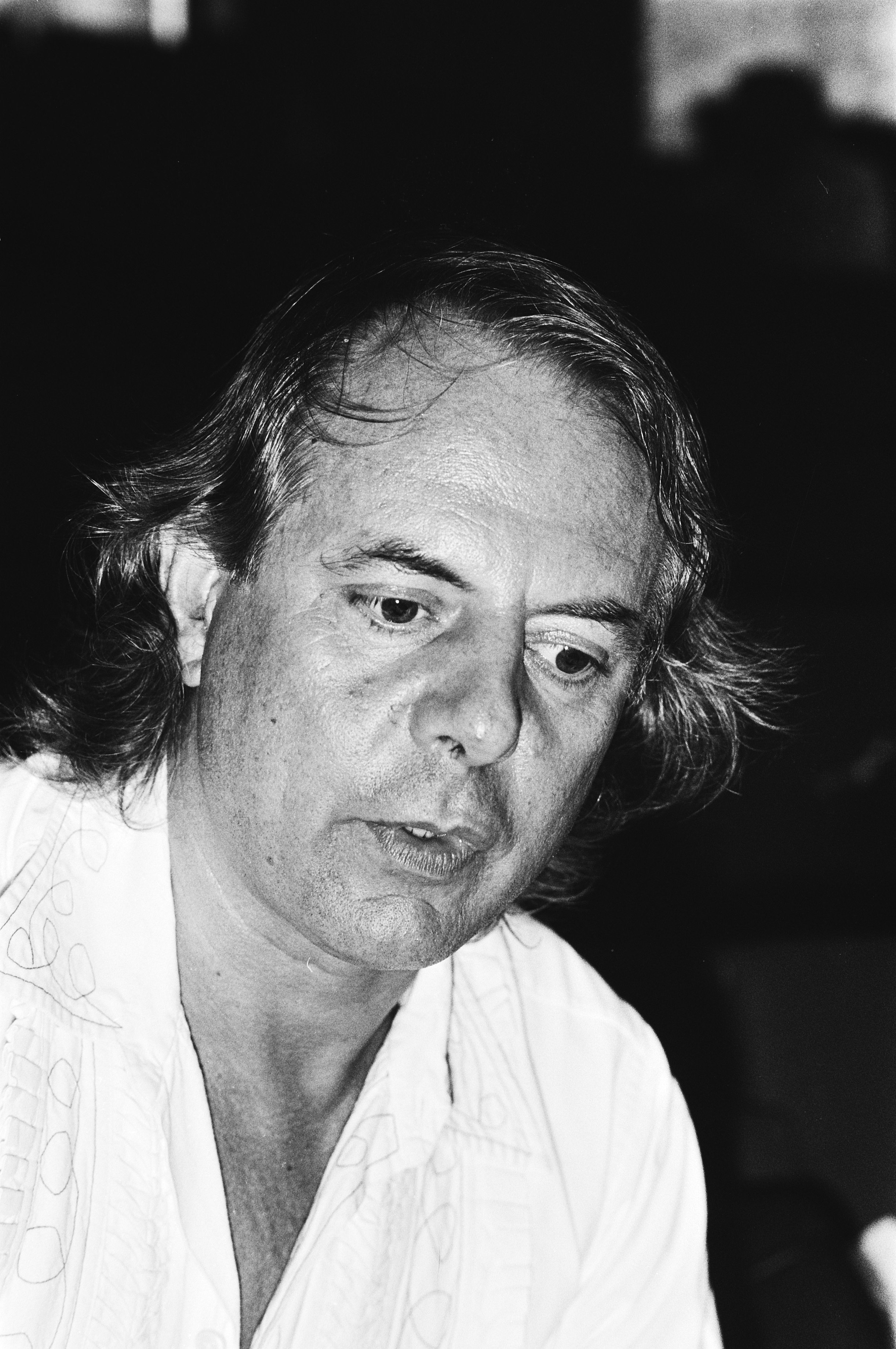
German composer Karlheinz Stockhausen (pictured) taught and heavily influenced the aspiring Vivier.

In 1971, following studies with Gilles Tremblay, Vivier studied for three years in Europe, first with Paul Méfano at the Conservatoire de Paris, then Gottfried Michael Koenig at the Institute for Sonology in Utrecht, and finally Karlheinz Stockhausen in Cologne. He had first heard Stockhausen's music after attending a 1968 concert of new music in Montréal, and was fascinated with the German composer's experimental approach to timbre. Vivier moved to Cologne hoping to take lessons with him, and was initially rejected. Stockhausen reportedly sight-read one of his manuscripts and exclaimed to his students, "Just look at this! Look at this writing! Would you accept somebody like this as a student? This man will never be a good composer, with writing like that!" Vivier was rejected once more before being formally accepted in Stockhausen's courses at the Darmstädter Ferienkurse for the first semester of 1972, studying additionally with professors Hans Ulrich Humpert and Richard Toop.

Vivier was strongly influenced by Stockhausen, and would revere the composer as the greatest in music history. (Note: Tremblay was of the opinion that Vivier secured his place at the Darmstädter Ferienkurse via flattery toward Stockhausen. As he tells it, Stockhausen asked the aspiring Vivier why he wanted to study with him. "Vivier said: 'Because you are the greatest composer in the world.' That was enough: the only entrance test!") Stockhausen, however, did not initially think much of the enthusiastic Vivier. Toop once stated, "paradoxically, Stockhausen never seemed to take Claude as seriously as he took most of the other students". This did not deter Vivier, however: "Claude was by far Stockhausen's most loyal adherent in the class (in fact, I think of loyalty as one of Claude's key characteristics), and the only one to share Stockhausen's spiritual outlook to any significant degree". He also had a reputation among his classmates, often being teased and ridiculed for his disheveled, eccentric appearance and flamboyant behaviour. In spite of this, Vivier did develop amicable relationships with some of his peers, including Gérard Grisey, fellow Québécois Walter Boudreau, and Horațiu Rădulescu. Vivier performed as a percussionist in a Darmstadt production of Rădulescu's Flood for the Eternal's Origins (1970), described by the composer as being written for "global sound sources".

His early works have aspects that are derivative of his teacher, including radical approaches to serialism and the twelve-tone technique. Vivier differed from his teacher and contemporaries like Pierre Boulez, however, by continuing to use melody as the driving force of his compositions. He had also begun composing experimental electroacoustic music inspired by his first semester in Utrecht. The first piece he wrote while under Stockhausen's tutelage was Chants (1973) for seven female voices, which he would describe as "the first moment of my existence as a composer." Vivier became familiar with a precedent to the type of approach he would adopt in future compositions – the use of combination tones derived from ring modulation. Stockhausen's Mantra (1970) for two pianos and electronics perhaps relates most strongly to Vivier's musical occupations.

==== Style shift ====
Between 1972 and 1973, Vivier dramatically shifted his musical language. He had come to reject twelve-tone music as "too restrictive" and began furthering his own unique style. He explored the possibilities of monody and homophony in his vocal works, and more confidently applied his langues inventées and multilingual texts. His works for larger ensembles like orchestras began to show the timbral influence of Arnold Schoenberg in his application of Klangfarbenmelodie, and the post-romantic expressivity of Gustav Mahler. Vivier once stated that Mahler was perhaps the musician who he had most in common with; Frédéric Chopin and Mozart were two others he would relate himself to in terms of musical application.

=== Return to Canada ===
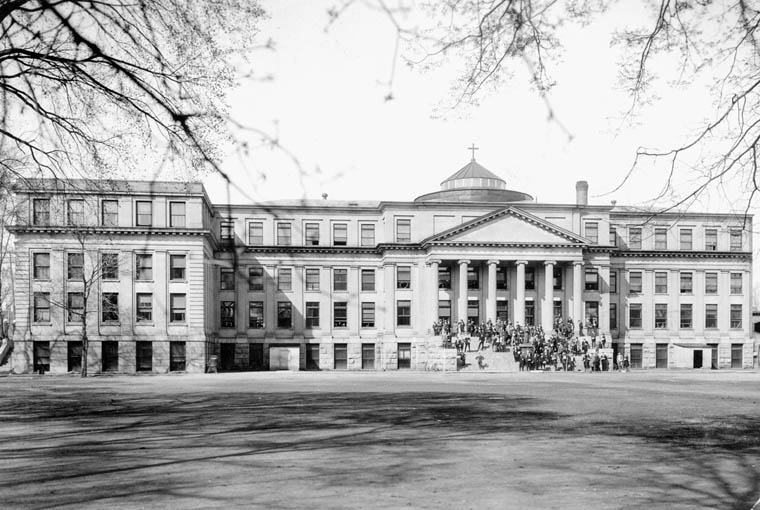
Vivier would lead the contemporary music department at the University of Ottawa (pictured) in the mid-1970s.

In 1974, Vivier returned to Montréal to begin establishing a career as a freelance composer in his home country after years of little to no recognition. He took a job as an organ teacher for a local school, Galipeau Musique, to pay for the rent of his new inner-city apartment, but would continue to struggle financially as he readjusted to life in Québec. The Canadian Broadcasting Corporation (CBC) commissioned an orchestral piece from Vivier the same year, to be played by the National Youth Orchestra of Canada under Marius Constant. The resulting piece, Siddhartha (1976), was completed nearly two years later after many revisions. (Note: Vivier based the plot of his orchestral piece around Hermann Hesse's 1922 novel of the same name. This novel had gained a newfound resurgence in popularity during the counterculture revolution, and had already begun to serve an influence to other musical works; among them being Ralph McTell's song "The Ferryman" (1971) and Yes's album Close to the Edge (1972).) It was his most ambitious project up to that point, and as noted by György Ligeti, was his first foray into Asian influences, specifically Indian raga. The Youth Orchestra contacted Vivier soon after receiving the score, saying the work was far too complex and technically difficult to be performed. It remained unperformed until several years after his death.

He took up other professorial and pedagogical jobs during this time, including at the Collège Montmorency in Laval, the Université de Montréal, and the University of Ottawa. The composer would tell an interviewer that he was "not liked" at Montmorency, and was described by a peer to be "a catastrophe" as a teacher. Vivier's time at the University of Ottawa was considerably more rewarding; In 1975 he was placed in charge of the university's foremost contemporary ensemble, the Atelier de musique contemporaine. His teaching contract lasted for the seven months from October 1975 to April 1976, and was paid hourly at a rate of approximately $20. He would frequently commute by bus from his apartment in Montréal to Ottawa.

=== Ethnomusicological journeys ===
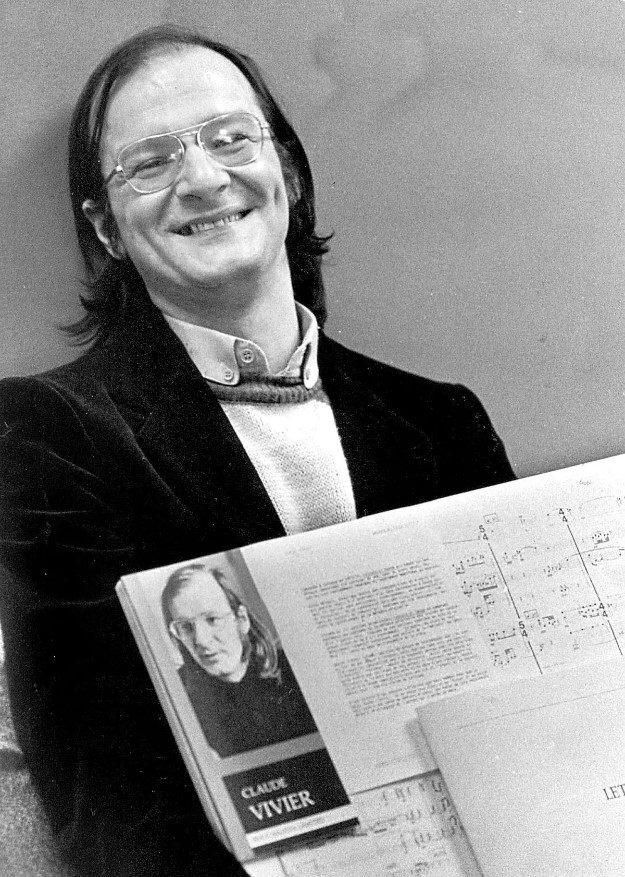
Vivier c. February 1980, holding the orchestral score for his opera Kopernikus (1979).

From late 1976 to early 1977, Vivier spent some time travelling to Egypt, Japan, Iran, Thailand, Singapore, and Bali to document the music of these regions. The differing musical cultures and traditions he encountered easily infiltrated his own compositional style; the most prominent change was his newfound fixation with more complex rhythms. His piano piece Shiraz (1977), named after the eponymous Iranian city, contains a flurry of interlocking rhythmic combinations and pulses at great speed. Vivier was inspired to write the piece after listening to two blind singers perform in the city's market square. He wrote in the piece's program notes how he found Shiraz to be "a pearl of a city, a diamond vigorously cut." (Note: Vivier wrote the performance notes to Shiraz (1977) in French, and this sentence has been translated in different ways. Boosey & Hawkes uses the translation given in the article, but biographer Bob Gilmore states the sentence as, "a pearl of a city, a hard-sculpted diamond".) His later visit to Singapore would be described in his journal with three words. "Bells: joy. Ecstasy".

He visitied kabuki theatres in the Tokyo area and was struck by the ritual-like nature of both the music and physical performance. Zipangu (1980) was later written as a Japanese-infused work for string orchestra, with elements of South Indian Carnatic music (including dronal imitation of the tanpura, rhythmic tala, further raga manipulation and chalanata). The name of the piece is taken from a former and antiquated exonym for Japan, roughly translated to mean "the land of sunrise". (Note: Can also be latinized as "Jipangu" and "Chipangu"; Vivier is believed to have taken the name Zipangu from an outdated form of Chinese romanization used in Marco Polo's journals; see Names of Japan for further information.) Zipangu is considered by many to be the composer's most aggressive and "unforgiving" piece, as it features a plethora of extended techniques (including snap pizzicato and bow overpressure) and denser harmonic content atop a complex melody, similar to the string compositions of Krzysztof Penderecki.

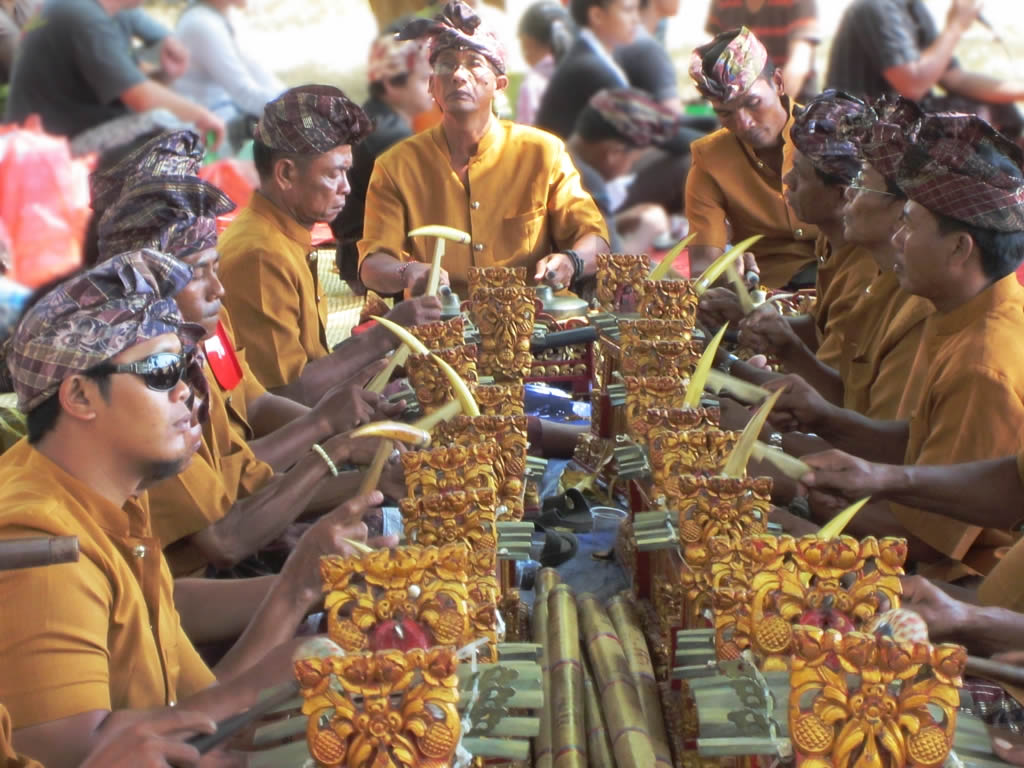
A traditional Balinese gamelan orchestra, which Vivier conducted extensive research in.

Bali was where he spent the most time, meticulously analyzing the traditional gamelan music of the region and attempting to learn the Balinese language. Vivier kept an incredibly detailed notebook where he wrote everything he had learned from local villagers, including an anatomical chart with various body parts labelled in Balinese. He described his Bali trip as "a lesson in love, in tenderness, in poetry and in respect for life". His ensemble pieces Pulau Dewata (1977) and Paramirabo (1978) are both directly influenced by Balinese gamelan, with a modified form of kotekan (a method of rhythmic alternation akin to hocketing) being used between two atonal melodies.

Vivier concluded his journey in Thailand in January 1977 and returned to Montréal, cutting the trip six months short of what he had initially anticipated. The reason why has been disputed, but he wrote to the Canada Council for the Arts that the trip had rendered him "exhausted, nervously and physically".

=== Burgeoning career ===
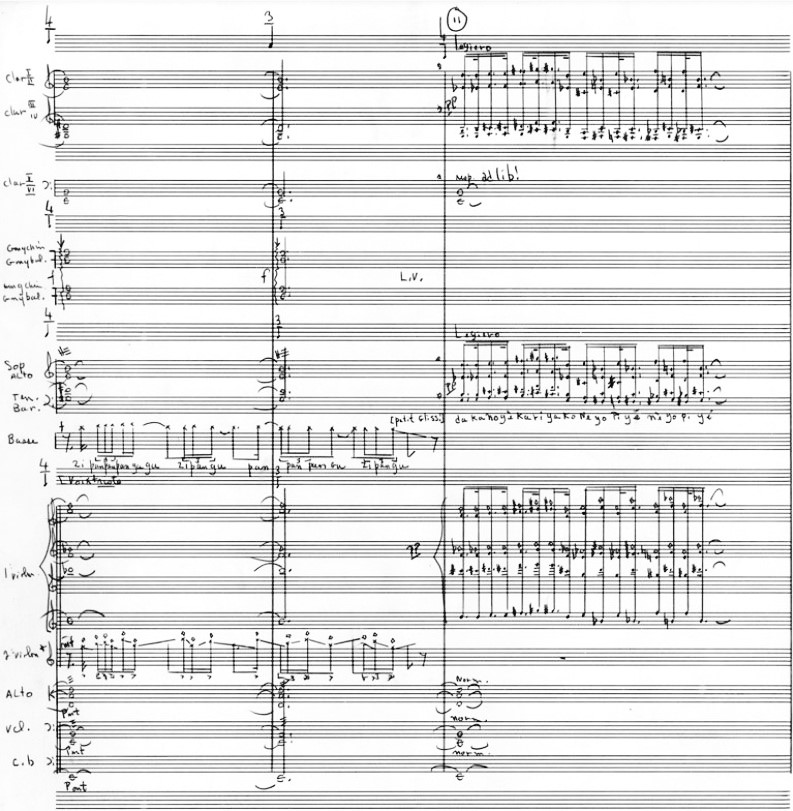
Original manuscript paper from Vivier's unfinished cantata Rêves d'un Marco Polo (1981–83), showing his exploration into spectralism and jeux de couleurs.

Working with Québécois pianist Lorraine Vaillancourt, composer John Rea, and Spanish expatriate composer José Evangelista at the Université de Montréal, he began a series of concerts featuring new performances of contemporary works entitled Les Événements du Neuf. He wrote some pieces for the Québec dance ensemble Le Groupe de la Palace Royale, including the ballets Love Songs and Nanti Malam (1977), both showing the Balinese influence he would continue to retain. Lonely Child (1980) was written as another commission from the CBC, this time with the Vancouver Symphony Orchestra under the direction of Serge Garant. Vivier's small-scale opera Kopernikus (1979) was premiered in its orchestral form on 8 May 1980 at the Théâtre du Monument National in Montreal, with Vaillancourt conducting the orchestra.

He briefly travelled to Europe in November of the same year to confer with the French spectral composers Gérard Grisey and Tristan Murail, the former of whom was an old friend of Vivier's from the Darmstadt school. They would together study, "spectral calculation[s] of the relationships between the bass note and the melodic note". Spectral music would later become the main thesis of Vivier's last compositions. He would label his spectralist techniques as jeux de couleurs ("play of colours"), a blending of harmony and orchestral timbre that rises above a fundamental two-voiced texture; (Note: Canadian musicologist Ross Braes asserts that Vivier's "jeux de timbres" were the compositional precursor for the couleurs that would later define the last stage of his career. Braes uses the term jeux de timbres, which appears in Vivier's rough drafts and sketches, to represent the "vertical expansion of melody into something quasi-timbral" using, "predetermined chords derived from the principal melody (or scale)". Most often these so-called predetermined arrangements frequently involve mirror inversion (popularized by Béla Bartók), natural harmonics, and fixed interval classes. The jeux de timbres are represented clearest in the pieces Kopernikus (1979) and Orion (1979).) very much inspired by the exploratory works of Grisey, such as Partiels (1975). Jeux de couleurs arose from Vivier's preoccupation with the vertical manifestation of melody, and how various instruments of the orchestra could be used to replicate specific tone colours through the harmonic series. This is a considerable departure from the principles of klangfarbenmelodie, as Vivier began to use frequency modulation and other intervallic algorithms to reach notes beyond 12-tone equal temperament. In his scores, he often writes out the tuning in cents to precisely map out the frequencies for performers. In a letter addressed to Grisey, shortly before his death, Vivier wrote: "I'm also composing with spectra now. You've influenced me... only I twist mine a little!"

The Canadian Music Centre, of which he had been a member, named him "Composer of the Year" in 1981, for continuously endorsing and contributing to the contemporary musical language of Canada.

== Later life and death ==
=== Final move ===
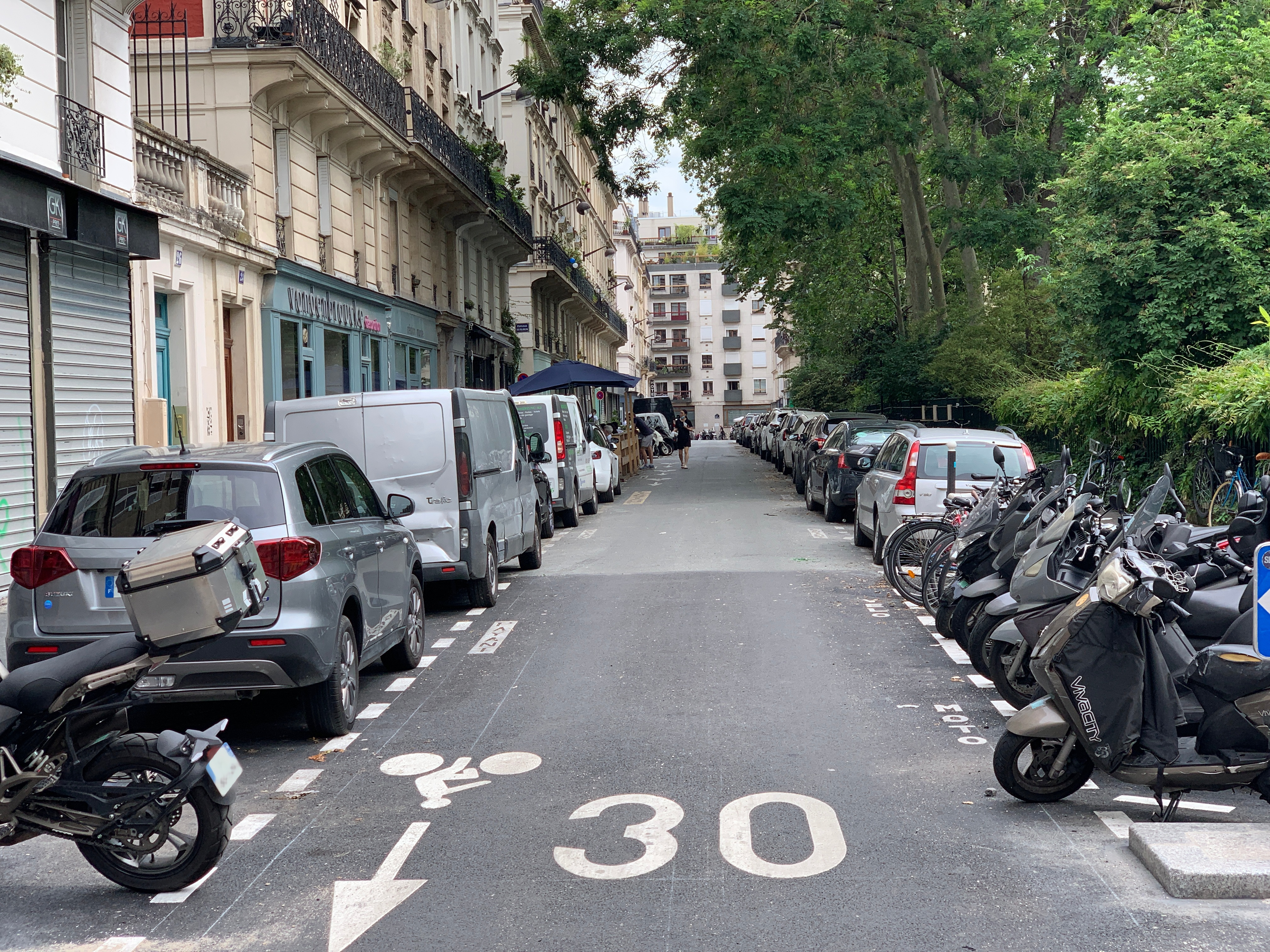
Rue du Général-Guilhem in Paris. The 7th door from the left, no. 22, was Vivier's last home and the site of his murder.

In June 1982, Vivier decided to temporarily relocate to Paris, believing he had exhausted all the orchestras and ensembles he could possibly be commissioned from in Canada. He left most of his possessions behind and lived in a small apartment on rue du Général-Guilhem in Paris's eleventh arrondissement, in the northeastern corridor of the city. Despite troubled financial circumstances, Vivier was confident and pleased to be in the city. He spent the majority of his days composing, first working on Trois airs pour un opéra imaginaire (1982). A few months later, he began a short but passionate relationship with the American expatriate author Christopher Coe. The relationship ended on 24 January 1983, when Vivier found out Coe had another boyfriend in New York City. It was one of Vivier's few serious relationships. Coe would later write a novel depicting a fictionalised account of their love affair, entitled Such Times.

==== First attack ====
On the evening of 25 January, the day after severing his relationship with Coe, Vivier solicited an unknown male prostitute at a Parisian gay bar and brought him back to his apartment. Before anything occurred, the man suddenly "grew violent" and attacked Vivier with a pair of scissors, slashing his face and neck, resulting in many superficial wounds. Before the assailant made off with the contents of Vivier's wallet, he cut the composer's phone line with the same scissors. Vivier rushed to his friend, Philippe Poloni, who was staying in an apartment complex not far from his. He recalled in a letter sent the morning after, "Philippe has been marvelous with me – I cried in his arms – he was incredibly tender with me – we talked a little, he looked after me and he also took care of this wound in my being which touched my soul to its depths". Poloni helped recompose Vivier, but warned him of the many truqueurs (cheats) in the area who could trick him into being robbed again.

The incident profoundly affected Vivier and made him significantly more paranoid and self-conscious, "I'm afraid, afraid of myself, I'm afraid of failing in my task – I'm so stupid, so weak, so incapable of living my creative solitude fully and that is what I have to force myself to do". Despite this, however, he continued to visit other gay bars in the area, to the frustration and worry of friends who feared another attack would happen.

=== Death ===
On the evening of Monday, 7 March 1983, Vivier was drinking at a different bar in the Belleville neighbourhood and invited twenty-year-old Pascal Dolzan to spend the night at his flat. The circumstances of what exactly happened that night and early the following morning are still a matter of speculation, but Dolzan would later say that he accepted Vivier's invitation with the intention of robbing and killing him. The exact time in which he did so is unknown.

On Tuesday, Vivier was scheduled to give a midday lecture with Belgian musicologist Harry Halbreich on the music of Quebec, at the Conservatoire de Paris. When he did not show up, Halbreich immediately suspected something to be wrong, "I became worried very quickly, because by nature he was absolutely punctual and precise about work-related matters. I called his place all afternoon but there was no reply, and in the evening, when I gave the talk, alone, alas, I knew something serious had happened". Vivier was known to lock himself away for weeks at a time when working on music, but he had never missed a scheduled meetings without informing anyone. Halbreich contacted his sister Janine Halbreich-Euvrard, who lived close to Vivier's flat, to check on him. She found his apartment door locked, and received no response when she knocked repeatedly. Halbreich relates, "I had to leave for Brussels, and I asked my sister to inform the police. That Saturday my sister telephoned me, in tears, and told me that they had found him".

Vivier's body was discovered by police who had entered his ransacked apartment on Saturday, 12 March, and seen blood pooled beneath and beside his bed. He was found stuffed between two mattresses, having been beaten, strangled, suffocated, and stabbed with a large dagger at least forty-five times, rendering him nearly unrecognizable. (Note: The initial police report stated twenty-four stab wounds were found on Vivier's body, but the autopsy and subsequent reports would say the true tally was forty-five.) He was stabbed with such force that the dagger penetrated the mattress in several areas and left blood spatter on the walls and ceiling. First responders initially suspected two or more men to be responsible, given the extensive damage to Vivier's body and home.

Dolzan was considered the prime suspect, and was arrested nearly eight months later on 26 October, at a pub in Place de Clichy. He confessed to Vivier's murder, stating that he had strangled the composer with a dog collar and jammed a white handkerchief in his mouth to silence his screams. (Note: Dolzan's initial explanation for Vivier's murder was that it was accidental, as the result of a BDSM session gone wrong. This answer was initially accepted by authorities, as Vivier was known to engage in BDSM activities with other partners. The discovery of Dolzan's heterosexuality and his history as a fugitive from justice, however, led to this explanation being largely discounted. Investigators found no evidence to suggest that Vivier had hired Dolzan as a prostitute for sadomasochistic favours, or that they had ever engaged in sexual activities. Dolzan would change his story several times and attempt to plead not guilty by reason of insanity, with his defense arguing, "his childhood in public care was responsible for his psychological problems". Some modern biographers of Vivier consider the BDSM explanation to still be a possibility, though.) The only thing Dolzan ended up taking before leaving and locking the apartment door were a few thousand francs he found in Vivier's wallet. The police eventually discovered that Dolzan was a homeless serial criminal who had assaulted other gay men in Paris prior to Vivier's murder. His modus operandi was to enter gay bars – despite not being gay himself – and seduce men with the intent of assaulting them and stealing their valuables, similar to other truqueurs in the city. Dolzan is confirmed to have assaulted several men and killed two others in this way, mostly in the area encompassing the Marais (currently home to France's largest gay village). The true number of victims is possibly higher.

During Dolzan's subsequent trial, the court came to the conclusion that Vivier and his other victims were robbed, assaulted and murdered as the result of a series of drug-fueled hate crimes. He was charged for and found guilty of all three confirmed killings by Paris's cour d'assises and given the maximum possible sentence of life imprisonment in November 1986. Dolzan was later transferred from the Penitentiary Centre in southern Lannemezan to a higher security prison in 1991, after engaging in a series of violent protests within the penitentiary.

==== Funeral and reactions ====
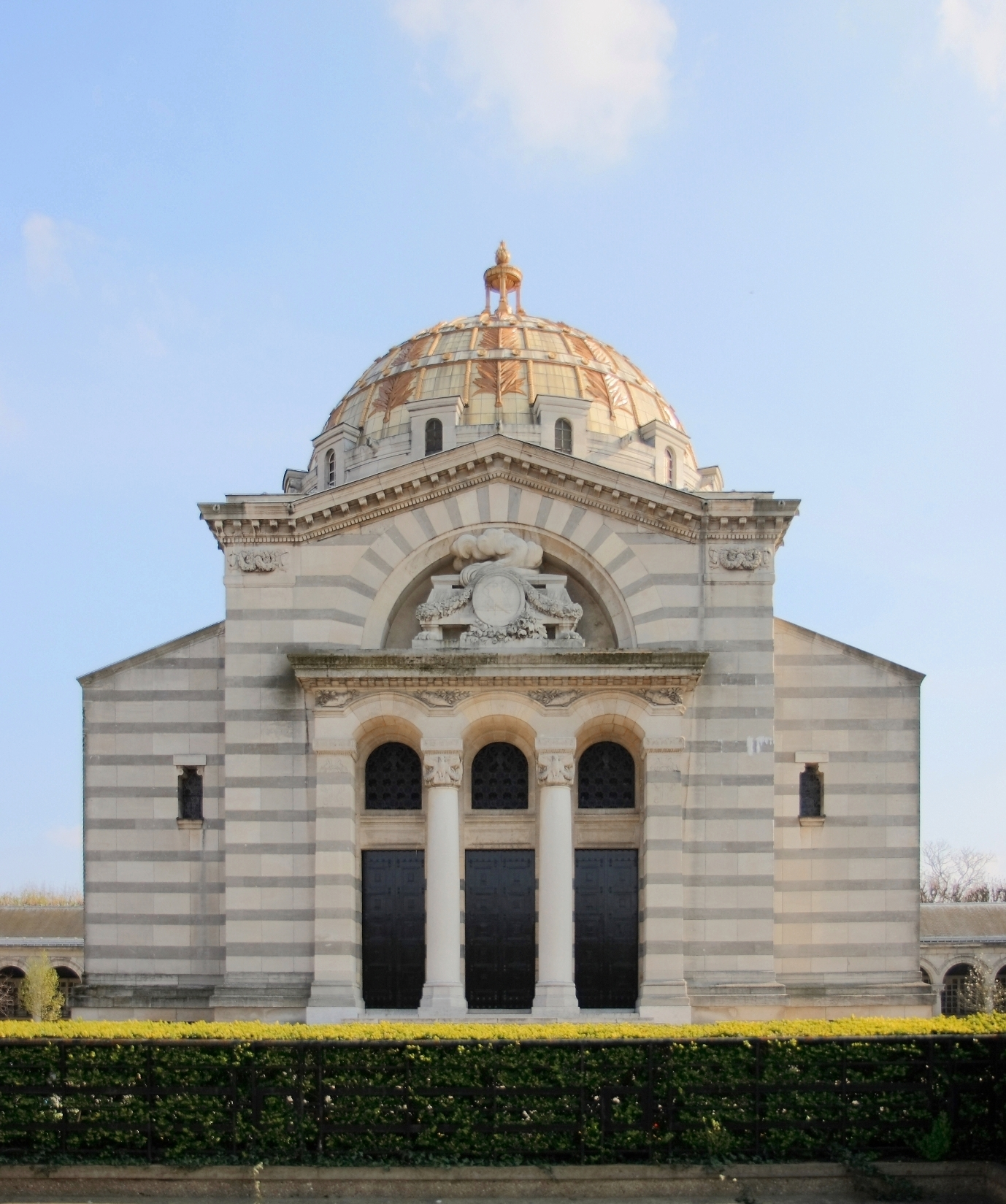
The Père Lachaise Crematorium, where Vivier was cremated on 23 March 1983.

As Vivier left behind no will, it was ultimately decided by Paris authorities to cremate his remains on 23 March 1983, as his body had been too bludgeoned and decomposed for morgue workers to embalm him. He was cremated at the Père Lachaise Crematorium, and his ashes were transported to Montreal for burial. A small ceremony was held in Paris on the same day, with his remains being substituted by a small wooden box in an improvised casket. Many of his friends and musical contemporaries were in attendance, including Grisey and Murail.

A proper funeral was held in Église Saint-Albert-le-Grand de Montréal on 14 April, what would have been Vivier's thirty-fifth birthday. The music performed there included the psalm setting from Ojikawa (1968), one of the earliest works in his catalogue. His ashes were placed in Laval's Salon Funéraire Dallaire. An official memorial concert followed on 2 June in the auditorium of Salle Claude Champagne, with performances of pieces including Prolifération (1969), Pianoforte (1975), Shiraz (1977) and Lonely Child (1980).

As news of his death spread throughout France and his native Québec, many of Vivier's colleagues and former teachers were shocked. Gilles Tremblay would say he was, "completely surprised" and, "... when he died we were very sad. But in a certain way I was furious. I was furious against him. You know, you don't have the right, when you have such talent, to be so stupid!" Some would question if he had any motive or incentive to have himself killed, especially as the composer was chronically depressed and known to have a fascination with death. Harry Halbreich would say after Vivier was attacked in January, "... we begged him to move, but he ignored these warnings, driven by who knows what horrible fascination with the darkness that he was so afraid of". Vivier's close friends Thérèse Desjardins and José Evangelista, conductor Vladimir Jurowski and others would suggest he had intentionally arranged his own death. There is no concrete evidence to suggest this, however.

== Personal life ==
=== Overview ===
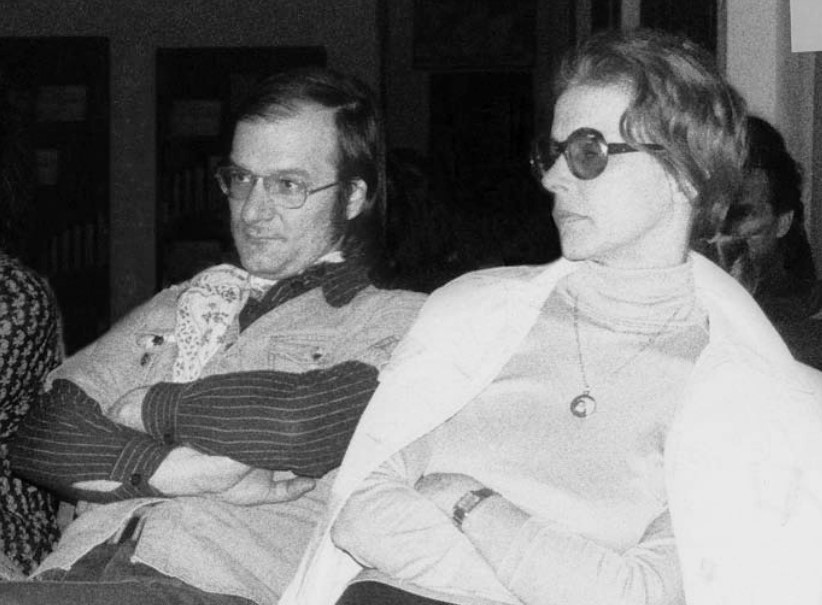
Vivier (left) seated with friend Thérèse Desjardins (c. early 1980s)

Vivier was best known among his friends and acquaintances for his extroverted personality, effeminate mannerisms, and distinctive laugh, described as being similar to the cackle of a hyena or "very loud and a bit creepy". He similarly had the tendency to blurt and shout out various phrases and expletives seemingly at random, with some speculating he had a form of Tourette syndrome. The more notable of these incidents include him screaming, "I am a bastard!" in the middle of a lunch with his teacher Gilles Tremblay, and him repeatedly yelling, "shit!" in Gottfried Michael Koenig's classroom.

Especially as his career was beginning, Vivier was recalled by many to have had incredibly poor hygiene. He was noted for wearing the same shearling coat nearly every day of his adult life, and growing out his greasy, long and unkempt hair. One acquaintance recalled how horrible and sheep-like he smelled, much to the bother of his classmates and teachers, including Stockhausen.

Vivier had various anxiety disorders and extreme nyctophobia, which would manifest in his adulthood as oftentimes giving himself a curfew before night fell, and regularly leaving a light on when going to sleep. It's unknown how exactly he developed this fear, but biographer Bob Gilmore posits that it originated in his childhood. Vivier would reference his nyctophobia in Lonely Child (1980), with the line, "Don't leave me in the dark, you know I'm afraid".

=== Sexuality and identity ===
Vivier was openly gay, and many of his compositions – as well as poems written in his teenage years – reflect progressive and homosexual themes. He would comment on, "all the extreme feminist thought, ultimately, that I have. A sensitivity that I have, very feminist, or gay, or, finally, a thinking that goes a little beyond the usual modes that are male/female, dominating/dominated, ... I stay very intimate, my music is very intimate". In the last few months of his life, he had begun working on an opera entitled Tchaïkovski, un réquiem Russe, which would have advanced the theory that Pyotr Ilyich Tchaikovsky was ordered to commit suicide upon the revelation of his sexual preferences. He announced the project to UNESCO music organisations and consulted Harry Halbreich for help with the libretto, but very little was completed in manuscript form and the opera was never staged.

Friends and subsequent historians would comment on how Vivier led a somewhat bohemian lifestyle — he had numerous lovers and homoerotic affairs throughout his life, with the only ones of confirmed identity being Dani Olivieri and Christopher Coe. Vivier was especially attracted to the stereotypically muscular, leather-clad biker. He was known to have been interested in the lifestyles and theatrics of the Hells Angels motorcycle gang, and once wrote of his sadomasochist bent to a friend: "Violence is fascinating, erotic also. You can go each time one step further". He would say in an interview with the Quebec LGBT magazine Le Berdache, "I no longer feel sorry for the fact that I am a faggot", reflecting the previous struggles and newfound confidence in accepting his sexuality.

It is believed that Vivier was a carrier of the HIV virus at the time of his death, as Christopher Coe had tested positive for AIDS in the early 1980s, around the time the two were dating. Philippe Poloni would say years later, "I think if Claude didn't die [of murder] he would have died of AIDS. I think his path was going that way". Coe himself died from AIDS-related complications in 1994.

==== Ethnicity ====
Despite having no evidence to suggest Vivier was ethnically Jewish, he would maintain throughout his life that he was — an experience with a Ouija board in Montréal would cement this belief, "the 'oracle' call[ed] out (in answer to Vivier's question 'who am I?') the name 'Jew'". After the 1982 Chez Jo Goldenberg restaurant attack, an antisemitic mass murder which occurred less than five kilometres from where Vivier was staying in Paris, he had begun to fear he would fall victim to a racially motivated hate crime. He wrote in a letter to Desjardins, "I've never before experienced racism and its animality so deeply in my skin".

== Music ==
=== Overview ===
When you listen to Vivier's late music, at first it sounds somewhat minimal, simple, naive; he seems to be a kind of minimalist, ... but compared to the Russians and the Baltic composers of that generation, Vivier uses much more complex harmonies. ... He had a very complicated system of natural harmonics and various rules for making choices – his compositional system was very sophisticated and difficult to understand. However, I believe that not harmony, but ritual is a hidden force in the music. ... His music is very difficult to perform very well.

— Louis Andriessen, 2002

Vivier is believed to have only forty-eight surviving compositions completed before his death. They vary in ensemble and included choral works, chamber music, electroacoustic music for tape, and large-scale opera. Vivier's musical style would shift consistently throughout his career; he was once an advocator of serialism, which had taken a hold on much of Europe's composers in the mid to late 20th century, but would abandon it and come to resent its popularity in later years:

[...] If you go back to serialism, you have to understand what they wanted to do. Serialism wanted to give individual notes their own weight, their individual weight and their individual balance, so you would hear all the notes, consciously. Then you would hear all the groups, and all the groups would have their own weight too. But if you do a cluster, and you say, well I have all my twelve notes there, it's nonsense.
[...] They couldn't serialize the harmony. They couldn't serialize the weight of the vertical relationships. So somehow, it turned into this nondescript vertical world. [...] Also in those years, they made a lot of mistakes. When you talk about balances, you can't do it by simply saying, one to twelve pitches, one to twelve dynamics, and one to twelve for everything. It doesn't work at all.

Vivier is considered to be one of the founders of spectral music, and is placed among the early group of pioneers referred to as the "German Feedback" group, alongside fellow composers and Stockhausen pupils including Péter Eötvös and Clarence Barlow. Parallels between Vivier's compositional style and that of Olivier Messiaen have been noted, especially regarding the use of dense chords in homophonic textures and use of east Asian instrumentation, such as tuned nipple gongs and gamelan-adjacent keyboards and melodic idiophones. He is considered one of the most important alumni of the Darmstadt school, in terms of his contribution to the postmodernist trend that flourished after his death. Some musicologists, however, classify Vivier as a postmodernist composer in his own right, who wrote some of the first and most consequential pieces of this era.

Many of his works center around Christian themes, including the chamber pieces Jesus erbarme dich (1973), Liebesgedichte (1975) and Les Communiantes (1977). Despite resenting much of his strict religious upbringing, he continued to maintain a strong spiritual disposition, still believing in God while having no allegiance to any specific denomination.

=== Application of language and multilingualism ===
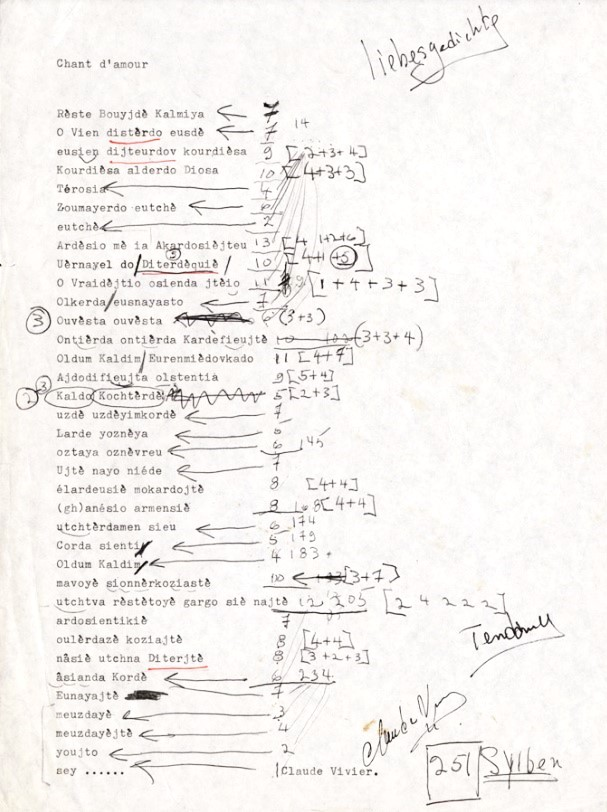
Early draft of the langue inventées used in the "Chant d'amour" from Liebesgedichte (1975)

The study of linguistics fascinated Vivier from a young age, and many languages are used in the texts and librettos of his vocal pieces, oftentimes juxtaposed on top of one another. He was a polyglot who would learn multiple languages at the same time – he is known to have been completely fluent in French, German and English, but he also took extended notes and studies on Greek, Latin, Italian, Balinese, Malay, Japanese, and more. The degree to how educated and conversational he was in the latter languages is not fully known.

Several examples of multilingual texts are present in Vivier's music. Chants (1973) predominately features a Latin text, which is sometimes manipulated in the form of being spoken backward. The lexicons of other languages, including Polish (mamouchka for "mother") are also present. The similarly Latin text from Virgil's Eclogues, alongside many other quotations, is used in Liebesgedichte (1975). The latter half of Glaubst du an die Unsterblichkeit der Seele? (1983) features the male narrator reciting a combined text of French and English.

==== The langue inventées ====
Vivier first recalled his tendency to create new languages as a child, saying his lack of identity and parents led him to, "[fabricate] my origins as I wanted, pretended to speak strange languages. [...] My whole sensibility became refined and increasingly I drew a veil around myself: finally I was protected!" The first example of this technique being used is in his piece Ojikawa (1968), albeit with a string of nonsense-words (e.g. "Niêdokawa ojikawa na'a'a'ouvina ouvi") strung together by the vocalist — similar to the sound poetry and grammelot of dadaists like Hugo Ball and Christian Morgenstern. Liebesgedichte (1975) follows a similar motif, but the text becomes more uniform and the basics of a functioning language begin to form, including repetition and a phonetic inventory. He attempted to learn the official languages of all the countries he visited, and the influence of these languages, mostly of Asian origin, show up in the sound of his own. Vivier would say, "All this language is the result of automatic writing. I have always invented my own language".

The specific phonemes Vivier would use were deliberately chosen for their "emotional content", and how they related to the frequency of the note being sung by the vocalist. He used a modified Latin script with diacritics to write out these sounds, but would occasionally borrow glyphs from other writing systems, including Cyrillic. Most of the langue inventées' words consist of a single syllable; multisyllablic words are often intentionally hyphenated in the manuscript.

=== Reception ===
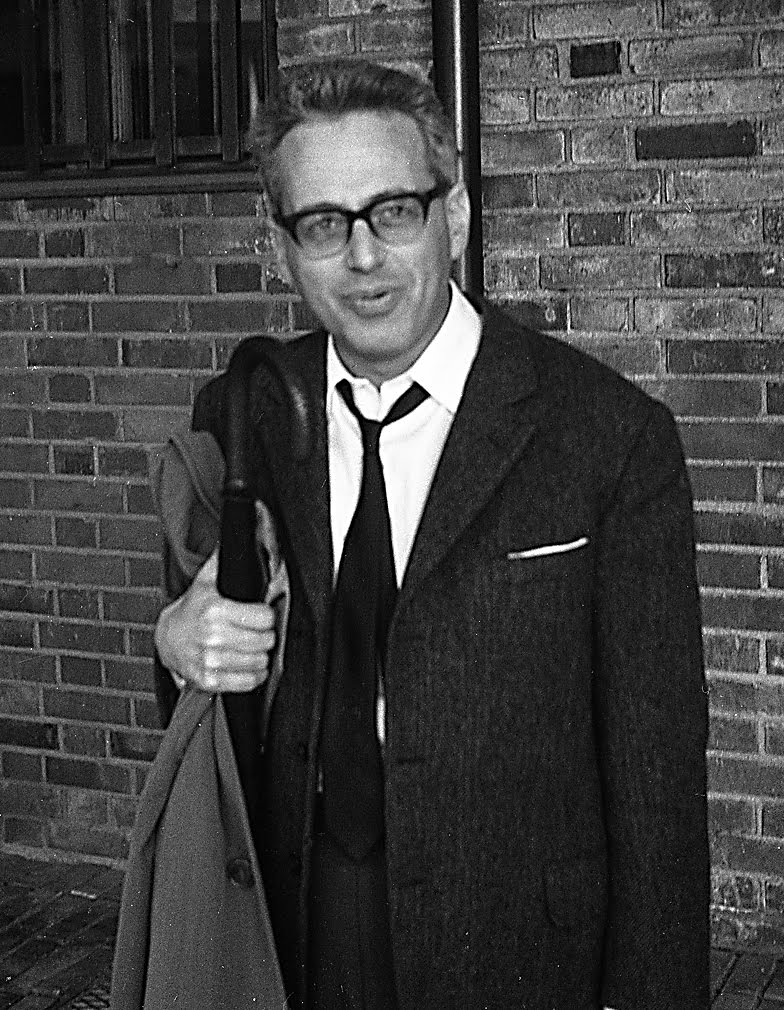
Hungarian composer György Ligeti (pictured) dedicated much of his later life to promoting Vivier's music

CBC Radio host and composer David Jaegar would say, "Vivier was brilliant enough to comprehend all of the theory, but he never let the theory stand in the way of self-expression. His was a unique voice that had both complexity and clarity". His friend Harry Halbreich wrote, "His music is truly unlike any other, and is situated completely on the fringes of all currents. From an expression direct and moving, his music only disoriented dry hearts, unable to classify this marginal genius. Claude Vivier had found what so many others searched and searched: the secret of a real new simplicity".

Modernist composers Louis Andriessen and György Ligeti are among those who have cited Vivier as a great inspiration to their own music; Ligeti would later dedicate his time to championing Vivier's catalogue posthumously, saying, "His music is one of the most significant, perhaps even one of the most important developments since the works of Stravinsky and Messiaen", and, "He was neither neo, nor retro, but at the same time was totally outside the avant-garde. It is in the seduction and sensuality of the complex timbres that he reveals himself to be the great master that he is".

=== Legacy and tributes ===
Vivier's close friend Thérèse Desjardins was designated the curator of much of his belongings and artifacts, and subsequently founded Les Amis de Claude Vivier (lit. "The Friends of Claude Vivier"; later renamed to Fondation Vivier), an organization dedicated to promoting his music and biographical details. His original manuscripts and incomplete sketches were donated by Desjardins to the Université de Montréal, where they are currently housed.

Former CMQM classmate and experimental composer Walter Boudreau would conduct the premieres of Siddhartha (1975) and Glaubst du an die Unsterblichkeit der Seele? (1983) in 1987 and 1990 respectively, with various Montreal-based orchestras and chamber ensembles. The London Contemporary Orchestra performed a special concert for Glaubst in an abandoned London tube station in 2013, to mimic the theme of the composition.

In 2005, Serbian-German composer Marko Nikodijević wrote the ensemble piece chambres de ténèbres / tombeau de claude vivier in remembrance of the composer. He would later write and premiere the 2014 opera Vivier at the Munich Biennale, to a libretto by Gunther Geltinger. It is mostly biographical and focuses on the last few years of his life.

The Société de musique contemporaine du Québec (SMCQ) commissioned the graphic novelist Zviane in 2007 to write a work on Vivier as part of their "Tribute" series, on the twenty-fifth anniversary of the composer's death. Zviane, working with cowriter Martine Rhéaume, published Des étoiles dans les oreilles (lit. "The Stars in the Ears") the same year. The inner sleeve, written by Zviane, says, "Vivier. Claude Vivier. As we say Mozart. Wolfgang Amadeus Mozart... Isn't it normal to recognize our own heroes? If music is a fundamental expression of humanity, then Claude Vivier knew how to express the quintessence of [Quebec] culture, our history, our dreams. Vivier is a real 'national treasure'".

== Lists of works ==
=== Complete list of musical works ===
In chronological order:

- L'homme (1967; lost) for organ
- Prélude pour piano (1967; lost) for piano
- Invention sur un thème pentatonique (1967; unfinished) for organ
- Quatuor à cordes (1968) for string quartet
- Ojikawa (1968) for soprano, clarinet and timpani
- Musique pour une liberté à bâtir (1968–69) for women's voices and orchestra
- Prolifération (1969, rev. 1976) for ondes Martenot, piano and percussion
- Hiérophanie (1970–71) for soprano and ensemble
- Musik für das Ende (1971) for twenty voices and percussion
- Deva et Asura (1971–72) for chamber orchestra
- Variation I (1972) for tape
- [untitled] (1972) for tape
- Hommage: Musique pour un vieux Corse triste (1972) for tape
- Désintégration (1972) for two pianos and optional tape
- Chants (1973) for seven female voices
- O! Kosmos (1973) for soprano and SATB choir
- Jesus erbarme dich (1973) for soprano and choir
- Lettura di Dante (1974) for soprano and mixed septet
- Hymnen an die nacht (1975) for soprano and piano
- Liebesgedichte (1975) for four voices and ensemble
- Pièce pour flûte et piano (1975) for flute and piano
- Pièce pour violon et clarinette (1975) for violin and clarinet
- Pièce pour violon et piano (1975) for violin and piano
- Pièce pour violoncelle et piano (1975) for cello and piano
- Pour guitare (1975) for guitar
- Pianoforte (1975) for piano
- Improvisation pour basson et piano (1975) for bassoon and piano
- Siddhartha (1976) for orchestra
- Woyzeck (1976) for tape
- Learning (1976) for four violins and percussion
- Journal (1977) for four voices, choir and percussion
- Love Songs (1977) ballet for seven vocalists
- Pulau Dewata (1977) for any combination of instruments
- Shiraz (1977) for piano
- Les Communiantes (1977) for organ
- Nanti Malam (1977) for seven voices
- Paramirabo (1978) for flute, violin, cello and piano
- Greeting Music (1978) for flute, oboe, percussion, piano and violoncello
- Kopernikus (1979), an opera in two acts
- Orion (1979) for orchestra
- Aikea (1980) for three percussionists
- Zipangu (1980) for string orchestra
- Lonely Child (1980) for soprano and orchestra
- Cinq chansons pour percussion (1980) for solo percussionist
- Bouchara (1981) for soprano and chamber ensemble
- Et je reverrai cette ville étrange (1981) for chamber ensemble
- A Little Joke (1981) for SATB choir
- Prologue pour un Marco Polo (1981) for soprano, alto, tenor, baritone and bass soloists and ensemble
- Samarkand (1981) for wind quintet and piano
- Wo bist du Licht! (1981) for mezzo-soprano, orchestra and tape
- Trois airs pour un opéra imaginaire (1982) for soprano and ensemble
- Rêves d'un Marco Polo (1981–83; unfinished) for choir, narrator and chamber ensemble
- Glaubst du an die Unsterblichkeit der Seele? (1983; unfinished) for choir, narrator and chamber ensemble
- Tchaïkovski, un réquiem Russe (1983; unfinished), opera

=== Complete list of published poems ===
In chronological order:

- Musique (1964–65)
- En musicant (1964–65)
- L'Amour (1965)
- Serge Bélisle (1965)
- Noël (1965)
- Postulat (1965)
- Not' petit bonheur (1965)
- Le clown (1965–66)

== See also ==
- List of LGBT classical composers
- Canadian classical music
