= Compositions for tape by Claude Vivier =

Group of compositions by Claude Vivier

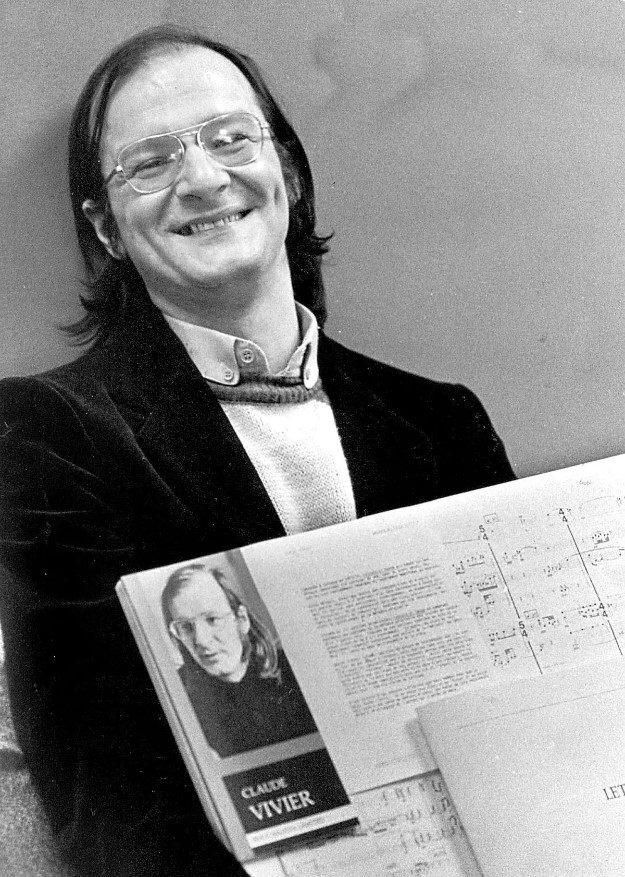
Claude Vivier c. February 1980, holding the orchestral score for his opera Kopernikus (1979)

Canadian composer Claude Vivier (1948–83) wrote four extant pieces for the tape recorder, in the musique concrète tradition established by French composer Pierre Schaeffer in the 1940s. Multiple other pieces from his career include the tape machine being used as an additional instrument to various ensembles. The majority of these compositions were a result of Vivier studying with Gottfried Michael Koenig at the Institute for Sonology in Utrecht.

== Solo tape ==
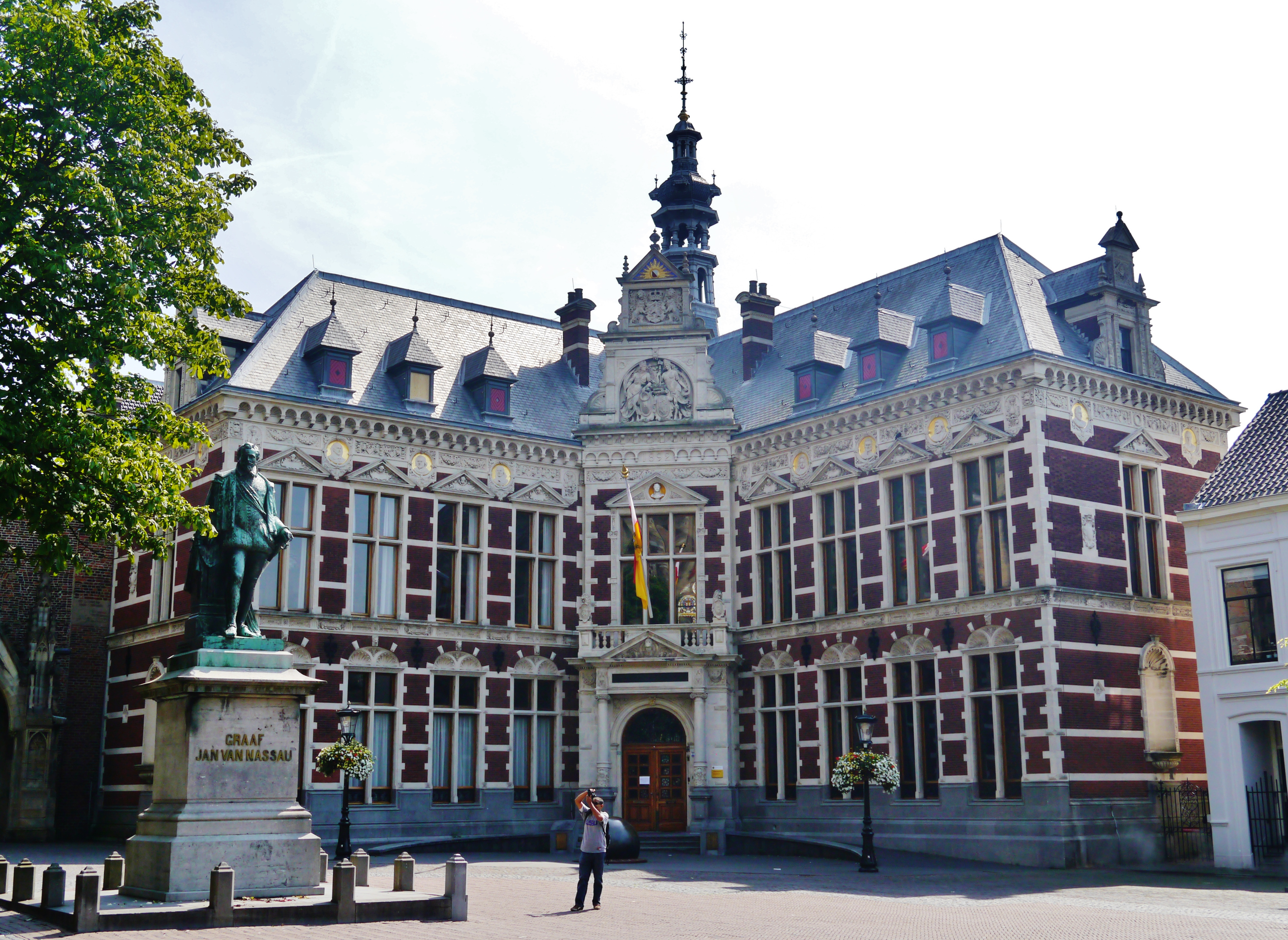
A view of Utrecht University, where the Institute for Sonology is located.

=== Variation I ===
Variation I was the first surviving piece Vivier wrote for tape, completed on 22 February 1972 with the assistance of Koenig and classmate Luctor Ponse. He wrote in a letter from this time, "[I] finished an electronic piece for four channels (10 mn 26 sec), they asked me if it was a concert piece or a study, it's absolutely a piece to be heard, so a concert piece."

=== [untitled] ===
An untitled work for tape was completed on 10 March 1972, a collaboration with Vivier and classmate Peter Hamlin, a young American composer hailing from the state of Vermont. The label on the original tape bears the words: "Peter Hamlin Hall-music (right track) / Claude Vivier Stair-music (left track) / Random Music (Stadium Generale: Toeval [chance]), 1972."

=== Hommage: Musique pour un vieux Corse triste ===
Hommage: Musique pour un vieux Corse triste (translation: Tribute: Music for a Sad Old Corsican) was completed in 1972, and was the last piece he produced while studying at the Institute. It is also his longest tape composition at twenty-seven minutes and thirty seconds. He would explain the inspiration behind the piece:

In a train taking me from Rotterdam to Antwerp, I met an old Corsican, completely drunk, whom everybody was afraid of. For my part I decided to get him into conversation and the idea came to me to record him discreetly with the little machine I had on me. I wanted to eternalize him, transcend him, take him out of the context of the train, to transform this meeting into an ecstatic vision, through the medium of electroacoustic music.

Vivier would later use Hommage as the soundtrack for his surrealist auto-biographical short film L'Homme de Pékin (1982).

=== Woyzeck ===
Woyzeck was completed in 1976, as incidental music for the Georg Büchner novel of the same name. It is the only composition for solo tape he wrote following his studies in Utrecht.

== Tape with ensemble ==
=== Désintégration ===
Désintégration, for two pianos and optional tape, was completed in 1972.

=== Kopernikus ===
Kopernikus, an opera for seven performers and tape, was completed in 1979.

=== Wo bist du Licht! ===
Wo bist du Licht!, a work for mixed orchestra and tape, was completed in 1981. The tape relays historical audio from the assassinations of Martin Luther King Jr. and Robert Kennedy above the orchestra.
