= Christopher Coe =

American novelist

- Born: November 27, 1953; Fountain Hill, Pennsylvania, U.S.
- Died: September 6, 1994 (aged 41); New York City, U.S.
- Education: Columbia University
- Occupation: Novelist

Christopher Coe (November 27, 1953 – September 6, 1994) was an American novelist.

== Life ==
Coe was born in Fountain Hill, Pennsylvania, and raised in Portland, Oregon. As an adult he lived in both New York City and Paris. Educated at Columbia University, he was a student of Gordon Lish and a classmate of Amy Hempel, David Leavitt and Anderson Ferrell.

His first novel, I Look Divine, was published in 1987; his second, Such Times, was published in 1993. His short stories were published in Harper's magazine and Story. As well as a writer, Coe also worked as a photographer and cabaret singer.

In January 1983, while in Paris, he had a romantic relationship with the composer Claude Vivier. Such Times is partly an account of this, fictionalized as the protagonist Timothy's relationship with a composer named “Claude,” but with departures from the actual relationship. In the fall of 2025, Such Times was edited by Will Meyer and reissued by Archway Editions with previously unpublished photographs and a new introduction by Anderson Ferrell.

Coe died of AIDS on September 6, 1994, at his home in Manhattan.
