= Zipangu (Vivier) =

1980 composition by Claude Vivier

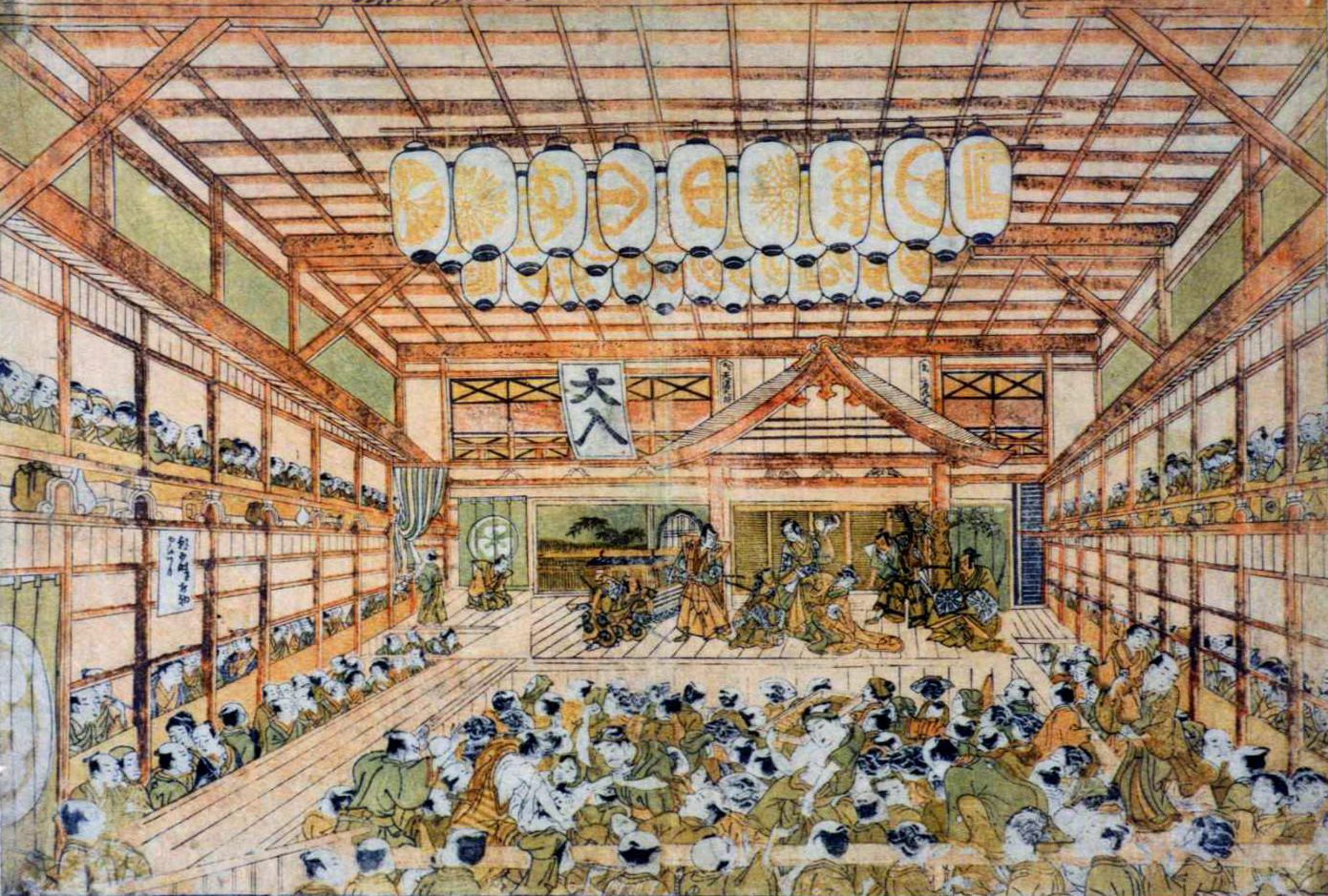
Vivier was heavily influenced by the kabuki theatres of Japan (pictured) following his 1976 visit to the country.

Zipangu is a 1980 work for string orchestra by Canadian composer Claude Vivier. Inspired by Japanese kabuki theatre music, it is considered by many to be the composer's most aggressive and "unforgiving" piece, as it features several extended techniques for strings (including snap pizzicato and bow overpressure) and dense harmonic content atop a complex melody, similar to the string compositions of Krzysztof Penderecki. A typical performance lasts around sixteen minutes.

== History ==
Vivier visitied kabuki theatres in the Greater Tokyo Area during a 1976 trip to Japan, and was struck by the ritualistic nature of both the music and physical performance. Zipangu was written in 1980 as a Japanese-infused work for string orchestra, and also features elements of Carnatic music (including dronal imitation of the tanpura, rhythmic tala, further raga manipulation and chalanata). The name of the piece is an antiquated Western exonym for Japan, meaning roughly "the land of sunrise".

The piece was completed in Vivier's Montreal apartment on 13 August 1980. It was premiered on 4 April 1981 as part of the "New Music Concerts" program at the University of Toronto. The conductor, Robert Aitken, was a friend of Vivier's and had his endorsement to conduct the premiere.

== Composition ==
=== Analysis ===
The piece begins with a senza vib. drone on the note E in the double bass, cellos, violas, and seventh violin. The harmonic and timbral content of the drone gradually changes as Vivier calls for bow positions and pressure to slowly move in a cycle. The composition's metre is entirely built around divisions of the quarter note; it has several measures in 1/4 time, as well as 2/4, 3/4, 4/4, 5/4, etc.

=== Program notes ===
The notes given by Vivier in the finished manuscript, with English translation:

« Zipangu » était le nom donné au Japon à l'époque de Marco Polo. Autour d'une mélodie, j'explore dans cette oeuvre différents aspects de la « couleur ». J'ai tenté de « brouiller » mes structures harmoniques par l'emploi de différentes techniques d’archet. Ainsi s'opposent un bruit coloré obtenu par pression exagérée de l'archet sur les cordes et les harmoniques pures losqu'on revient à la technique normale. Une mélodie devient couleur (accords), s'allège et revient peu à peu comme purifiée et solitaire.

"Zipangu" was the name given to Japan at the time of Marco Polo. Within the frame of a single melody I explore in this work different aspects of colour. I tried to "blur" my harmonic structure through different bowing techniques. A colourful sound is obtained by applying exaggerated bow pressure on the strings as opposed to pure harmonics when returning to normal technique. A melody becomes a colour (chords), grows lighter and slowly returns as though purified and solitary.

These program notes are the first indication of Vivier's fascination with Marco Polo. Before his death, he had begun working on an opéra fleuve (lit. "river opera") portraying the explorer's life, entitled Rêves d'un Marco Polo. Only the prelude, Prologue pour un Marco Polo, has survived; it is one of his most performed compositions.

== Instrumentation ==
The work is written for a small string orchestra, with thirteen performers.

Strings
7 Violins
3 Violas
2 Cellos
1 Bass

== See also ==
- Bowed string instrument extended technique
