= Shiraz (Vivier) =

1977 composition by Claude Vivier

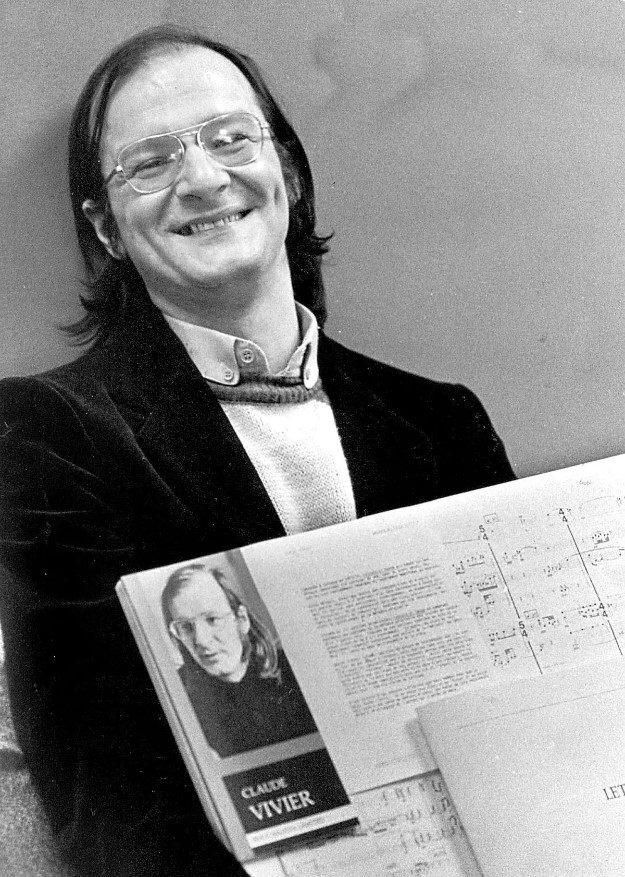
Claude Vivier c. February 1980

Shiraz is a virtuosic piano piece by Claude Vivier, written in 1977. It is named after the eponymous Iranian city, and contains a flurry of interlocking rhythmic combinations and pulses at great speed. Vivier was inspired to write the piece after listening to blind singers perform in the city's market square. He wrote in the piece's program notes how he found Shiraz to be, "a pearl of a city, a diamond vigorously cut."

Vivier had dedicated the piece to pianist Louis-Philippe Pelltier, whom he had met while studying at the Conservatoire de musique du Québec à Montréal. Pelltier had premiered his piece "Prolifération" (1969) many years prior, and approached Vivier to write another piece for piano.

I had asked Vivier to compose a brilliant, virtuosic piano piece featuring double notes, in the style of Schumann's Toccata. He began working on it very shortly thereafter and would often phone me late at night or early in the morning, while he was composing, to play for me, at an extremely slow speed, the chord progressions he had just discovered and which had sent him into raptures. He was anxious to develop new techniques that would free him from certain habits.

Shiraz was the last work he would write for solo piano.
