= Orion (Vivier) =

1979 composition by Claude Vivier

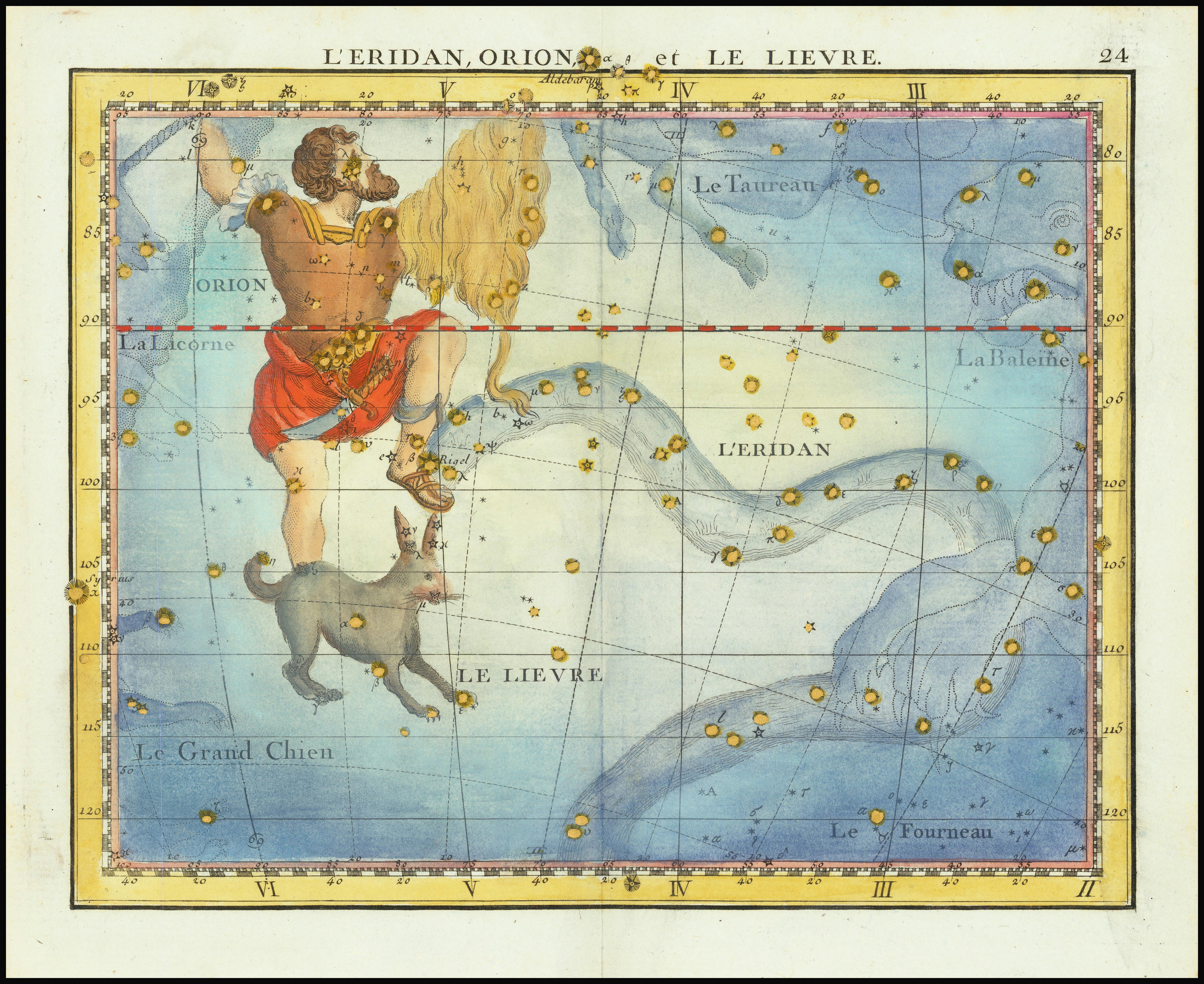
The constellation of Orion as portrayed in an early astronomical journal by John Flamsteed.

Orion is a 1979 orchestral suite by Claude Vivier, inspired by the constellation of the same name. It is among the first compositions in Vivier's catalogue to delve into a unique compositional style he referred to as the jeux de couleurs. A typical performance lasts around thirteen minutes.

== History ==
In early 1979, Vivier received a joint-commission from the Montreal Symphony Orchestra (OSM) and the Canada Council for the Arts (CCA), to compose a new work for the orchestra. It was completed in an uncharacteristically short amount of time, with the final manuscript being published on 6 October of the same year. The piece was premiered years later on 14 October 1980, at the Salle Wilfrid-Pelletier in Montreal, Canada, with the OSM under conductor Charles Dutoit.

== Composition ==
=== Program notes ===
The notes given by Vivier in the finished manuscript, with English translation given below:

Une mélodie à la trompette, encore la trompette, comme dans Kopernikus, instrument de la mort au Moyen-Age (voir le film de Bergman et lire l'Office des morts). Orion comprend six sections: présentation de la mélodie, premier développement de la mélodie sur elle-même, second développement de la mélodie sur elle-même, méditation sur la mélodie, souvenir de la mélodie et enfin la mélodie sur deux intervalles. Eternel retour, comme dans l'histoire avec un grand H, qui attend toujours avec impatience le retour de ses saints rédempteurs et de ses dictateurs. J'ai l'impression de piétiner dans un avion; je reste sur place, et pourtant, je vais du Caire à Kuala Lumpur. Allez-donc savoir!

A melody on the trumpet, again the trumpet, as in Kopernikus, instrument of death in the Middle Ages (see the film by Bergman and read l’Office des morts). Orion consists of six sections: statement of the melody, first development of the melody laid upon itself, second development of the melody laid upon itself, meditation on the melody, remembrance of the melody, and finally the melody in two intervals. Eternal homecoming, as in History with a capital H, which always waits impatiently for the return of its redemptive saints and its dictators. I have the impression that I’m sitting still on an airplane; I remain in the same place and yet I go from Cairo to Kuala Lumpur. Go and find out for yourself!

=== Instrumentation ===
The work features a large orchestra with a dense percussion section, typical of Vivier's late style.

Woodwinds

3 flutes
4 oboes
4 clarinets
3 bassoons

Brass

4 French horns
3 trumpets
3 trombones
1 tuba

Percussion

Balinese gong
Chinese gong
tam-tam
tubular bells
crotales
bass drum
vibraphone
marimba

Strings

30 violins
12 violas
10 cellos
8 basses

== Discography ==
- WDR Sinfonieorchester Köln, conducted by Peter Rundel, 2004 (Kairos)
- Deutschlandradio Kultur Deutsches Symphonie-Orchester Berlin, conducted by Ingo Metzmacher
