= Siddhartha (Vivier) =

1976 composition by Claude Vivier

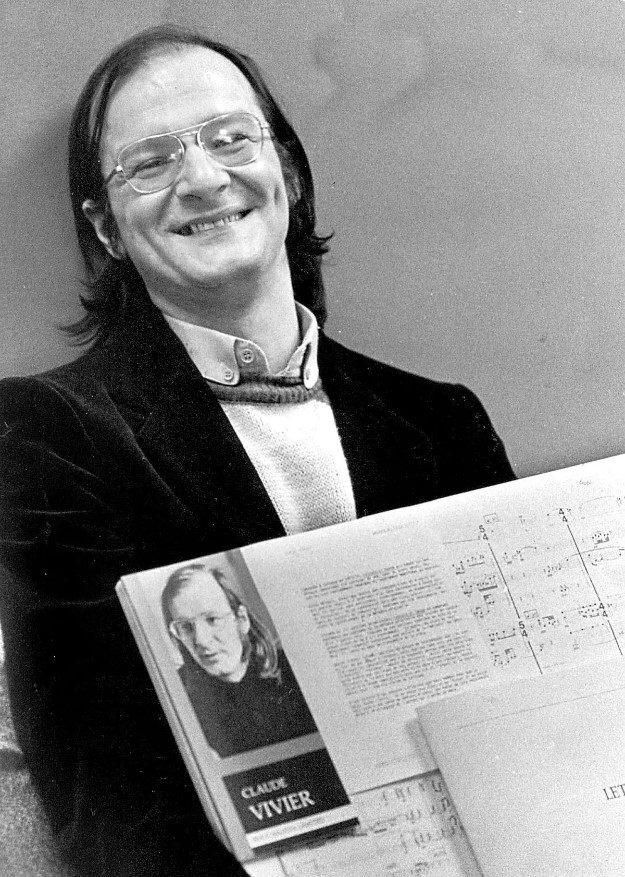
Claude Vivier in 1980

Siddhartha is an orchestral suite by Canadian composer Claude Vivier, which was completed in 1976.

== Composition ==
Vivier was commissioned to write an orchestral piece by the Canadian Broadcasting Corporation. He was inspired by Hermann Hesse's novel Siddhartha (1922), whose main character follows the teachings of Buddha. The work was completed in 1976, but it could not be premiered by the National Youth Orchestra of Canada under Marius Constant as planned, as they believed it was too difficult.

It was finally premiered on 14 March 1987, four years after the composer's death, in Montreal, by the Orchestre Métropolitain under the direction of Walter Boudreau, one of Vivier's former classmates at the Conservatoire de musique du Québec à Montréal.

== Instrumentation ==
The suite is written for an orchestra with the following instrumentation.

Woodwinds

3 flutes
4 oboes
4 clarinets
3 bassoons
Brass
4 horns
3 trumpets
3 trombones
1 tuba

Percussion

timpani
vibraphone

Strings

30 violins
12 violas
10 cellos
8 basses
