= Pianoforte (Vivier) =

1975 composition by Claude Vivier

Pianoforte is a 1975 piano piece by Canadian composer Claude Vivier.

Pianoforte was commissioned as part of a set of eight pieces for the Tremplin International Competition in Montréal in June 1975, including what became many of Vivier's Pieces (1975). Four of these were performed in the competition's finale by Louis Lortie, who won the grand prize of $5000.

It features retrogradation and inversions of a melodic theme stated in the beginning.
