= Nouvel Ensemble Moderne =

Canadian orchestra

Nouvel Ensemble Moderne (NEM), based in Montreal, Quebec, Canada, is one of the world's premier chamber orchestras specializing in contemporary classical music. It was founded in 1989 by Lorraine Vaillancourt, who serves as the ensemble's conductor.

The orchestra comprises 15 musicians: string quintet, wind quintet, a second clarinet, trumpet, trombone, piano, and percussion.

The Nouvel Ensemble Moderne has released 14 CDs of 20th and 21st century music.
