= Bouchara =

1981 composition by Claude Vivier

Bouchara (subtitled "chanson d'amour") is a 1981 work for mixed chamber ensemble by Canadian composer Claude Vivier. It was originally intended to serve as an interlude for his unfinished opera Rêves d'un Marco Polo (1983-), but was published independently of the opera after weeks of deliberation. A typical performance lasts around twelve minutes.

== Composition ==
The piece was premiered on 14 February 1983, at the Centre Georges Pompidou in Paris, France.

=== Program notes ===
The notes given by Vivier in the finished manuscript:

Bouchara se veut une longue chanson d'amour... le texte entier est une langue inventée, une langue d'amour, histoire se répétant éternellement.
Bouchara is meant to be a long love song... the entire text is sung in an invented language, a language of love, a story which repeats itself continually.

== Instrumentation ==
The work is written for a mixed ensemble of solo soprano, wind quintet, string quintet, and percussion battery.

Woodwinds

flute
oboe
clarinet
Horn in F
Bassoon

Percussion

Balinese gong
Chinese gong
tam-tam
tubular bells
bass drum
magnetic tape

Strings

2 violins
viola
cello
bass

Voice

soprano
