= Pièces (Vivier) =

Group of compositions by Claude Vivier

Canadian composer Claude Vivier's Pièces are a series of four chamber compositions for two performers, with varying instrumentation. They were all written in the year of 1975.

The Pièces were commissioned as part of a set of eight pieces for the Tremplin International Competition in Montréal in June 1975. Four of these compositions included piano, and were performed in the competition's finale by Louis Lortie, who won the grand prize of $5000.
