= Glaubst du an die Unsterblichkeit der Seele? =

1983 composition by Claude Vivier

Glaubst du an die Unsterblichkeit der Seele? (also known as Crois-tu en l'immortalité de l'âme; English: Do You Believe in the Immortality of the Soul?) is an unfinished 1983 chamber piece by Canadian composer Claude Vivier. It is one of his most famous compositions, as the libretto is claimed by some to have predicted the composer's own murder in March of the same year. The piece was left incomplete and unrevised with just three short movements, a typical performance lasting around eight minutes.

== History ==
Vivier is believed to have begun writing the piece in late 1982, while residing in Paris. In a letter to close friend Thérèse Desjardins from January 1983, Vivier wrote about the piece, "... I continued my work with some kind of marvelous serenity. I compose more slowly because I have more and more notes of my music to write! I have just completed the first six minutes of Crois-tu en l'immortalité de l'âme. It is almost 'dripping' that I am doing! The whole piece uses two poles: mobility and immobility!"

He stated in a following letter the next month, "It's strange but I have a blind fear of composing, of making mistakes. I've finished about eight minutes of my piece but I don't dare to write the last three as I'm so afraid of mistakes! Anyway I'll get over it, I'm sure. ... Finally the problem with the piece I'm working on now is that I want to write for large orchestra!"

== Libretto ==
=== Movement I ===
- Tenor I: (imaginary language) ka / ka rotch
- Synthesizer II: (German) Glaubst du an die Unsterblichkeit der Seele?
- Tenor I: (imaginary language) ka rotch kiè / so-imé fa yè ko
- Synthesizer II: (German) Glaubst du an die Unsterblichkeit der Seele?
- Tenor I: (imaginary language) na ko yesh mè fa yeu so ma / tiet ke no ro si / na yo chie
  (French) Écoutez, écoutez-moi!
  (imaginary language) koy dja
  (French) Vous savez que j'ai toujours voulu mourir d'amour mais
- Alto III: Mais quoi
- Tenor I: Comme c'est etrange cette musique, quine bouge pas
- Tenor II: Chut!
- Alto III: Parle
- Tenor I: Je n'ai jamais su
- Alto III: Su quoi
- Tenor I: Su aimer
- Alto III: Chante moi une chanson d'amour
- Tenor I: Oui.

=== Movement III ===
==== Narrator text ====
The text given to the narrator is bilingual, using both French and English. It is considered to be a semi-autobiographical story of Vivier's encounters in Paris the early 1980s. The story's narrator, Claude, recounts an incident on a Parisian subway.

In the original text:

C'était un lundi ou un mardi, je ne me souviens pas très bien. Mais tout cela n'a pas d'importance, l'important c'est l'événement qui devait se produire cette journée-là.

Il faisait gris, je me rappelle, j'avais donc décidé de prende le métro. Je dus même acheter des tickets, n'en n'ayant déjà plus sur moi. Je m'avançai sur le quai, juste un peu, et m'allumai une cigarette pour tromper mon ennui. Le grondement métallique du métropolitain annonça son arrivée. Le long véhicule bleu s'immobilisa. Je me dirigeai alors vers une des portières, en soulevai le loqueteau et m'engouffrai dans la voiture, le wagon de tête je crois. L'espace qui m'accueillait était presque vide, seule en face de la banquette où j'avais pris place, une vieille dame, un peu ridée, lisait en souriant son journal. On aurait dit un prêtre lisant son bréviaire. La dame avait l'air d'être gentille, assise qu'elle était de biais comme pour ne déranger personne. Installé sur ma banquette, j'avais l'impression qu'il m'arriverait quelque chose cette journée-là, quelque chose d'essentiel à ma vie.

C'est alors que mes yeux dans leur giration aléatoire tombèrent sur un jeune homme au magnétisme étrange et bouleversant. Je ne pus m'empêcher de le fixer longuement du regard. Je ne pouvais dérocher mon regard du jeune homme. Il semblait qu'il avait été placé en face de moi de toute éternité. C'est alors qu'il m'adressa la parole. Il dit : "Quite boring this metro, huh!" Je ne sus quoi lui répondre et dis, presque gêné d'avoir eu mon regard débusqué : "yes, quite." Alors tout naturellement le jeune homme vint s'assoir près de moi et dit : "my name is Harry." Je lui répondis que mon nom était Claude. Alors sans autre forme de présentation il sortit de son veston noir foncé, acheté probablement à Paris, un poignard et me l'enfonça en plein cœur.

In the full English translation:

It was a Monday or a Tuesday, I don't remember very well. But none of that's important, what's important is the event that was to happen that day.

The skies were gray, I remember, so I decided to take the subway. I even had to buy tickets, since I didn't already have any on me. I walked onto the platform, just a little, and lit a cigarette to ease my boredom. The metallic roar of the subway announced its arrival. The long blue vehicle came to a stop. I then went to one of the doors, lifted the latch and rushed into the car, the lead car I think. The space that welcomed me was almost empty, alone in front of the bench where I'd taken my seat: an old lady, a little wrinkled, read her newspaper with a smile. She looked like a priest reading his breviary. The lady seemed to be nice, seated at an angle as if to not disturb anyone. Installed on my bench, I had the impression that something would happen to me that day, something essential to my life.

It was then that my eyes in their random gyration fell upon a young man with a strange and overwhelming magnetism. I couldn't help but stare at him for a long period of time. I couldn't take my eyes off the young man. It seemed as though he had been placed in front of me for all eternity. It was then that he spoke to me. He said, "Quite boring this metro, huh!" I didn't know what to respond with and said, almost embarrassed at having had my eyes flushed out: "yes, quite." So quite naturally the young man came and sat down next to me and said: "my name is Harry." I replied that my name was Claude. Then, without any other form of introduction, he took a dagger out of his dark black jacket, probably bought in Paris, and plunged it into my heart.

== Controversy ==
As many parallels exist between the story and the events of Vivier's death in March 1983, including being stabbed with a dagger, many contemporary musicians or those who were close to the composer believe his death was an elaborate suicide following a bout of extreme depression and anxiety.

== Notable performances ==
Former Conservatoire de musique du Québec à Montréal (CMQM) classmate and experimental composer Walter Boudreau would conduct the world premiere of Glaubst du an die Unsterblichkeit der Seele? on 20 April 1990, with the Ensemble vocal Tudor de Montréal (ETM) and the Ensemble Société de musique contemporaine du Québec (ESMCQ).

The London Contemporary Orchestra performed a special concert for Glaubst in an abandoned London tube station in 2013, to mimic the theme of the composition.

== Instrumentation ==
Percussion
3 synthesizers
glockenspiel
Voices
Male narrator
Chorus:

3 sopranos
3 contraltos
3 tenors
3 basses
