= Kopernikus (Vivier) =

1979 opera by Claude Vivier

- Opera by Claude Vivier
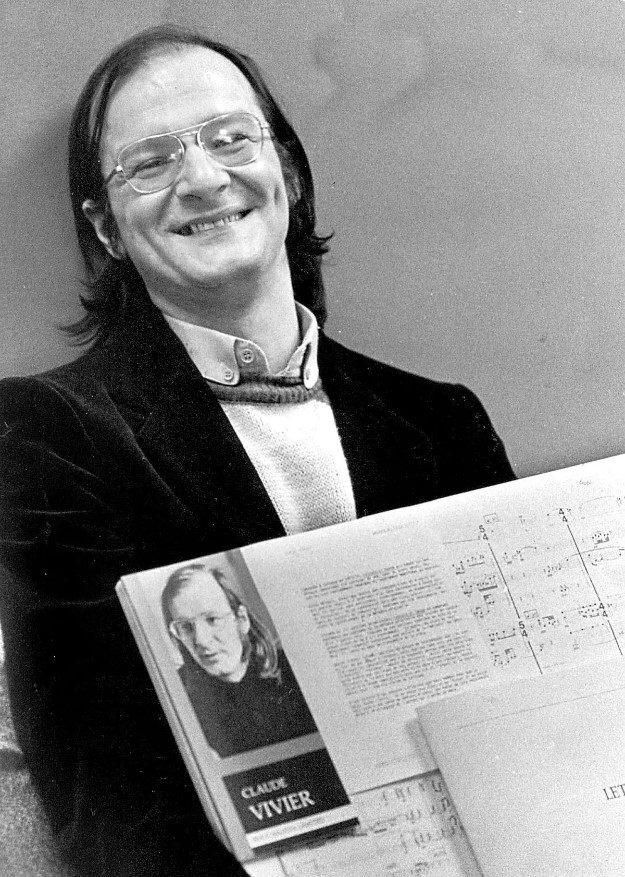
- Claude Vivier c. February 1980, holding the orchestral score for Kopernikus
- Librettist: Vivier
- Premiere: 8 May 1980; Monument-National

Kopernikus (sub. Rituel de mort; translated as Ritual of Death) is a 1979 opera in two acts by Canadian composer Claude Vivier, inspired by the astronomer of the same name. It is the only opera of three that Vivier completed prior to his death in 1983. A typical performance lasts around seventy minutes.

== History ==
The opera was completed on 14 May 1979, and first premiered only in its musical form on 8 May 1980 at the Théâtre du Monument National in Montréal, under the conductor Lorraine Vaillancourt. Vivier dedicated the piece to his "maître and friend" Gilles Tremblay, whom he had studied composition with for four years.

== Composition ==
=== Analysis ===
The libretto of Kopernikus, written entirely by Vivier, is composed of sections in German, French, and Vivier's langue inventées — an example of his preoccupation with linguistics and musical multilingualism.

=== Program notes ===
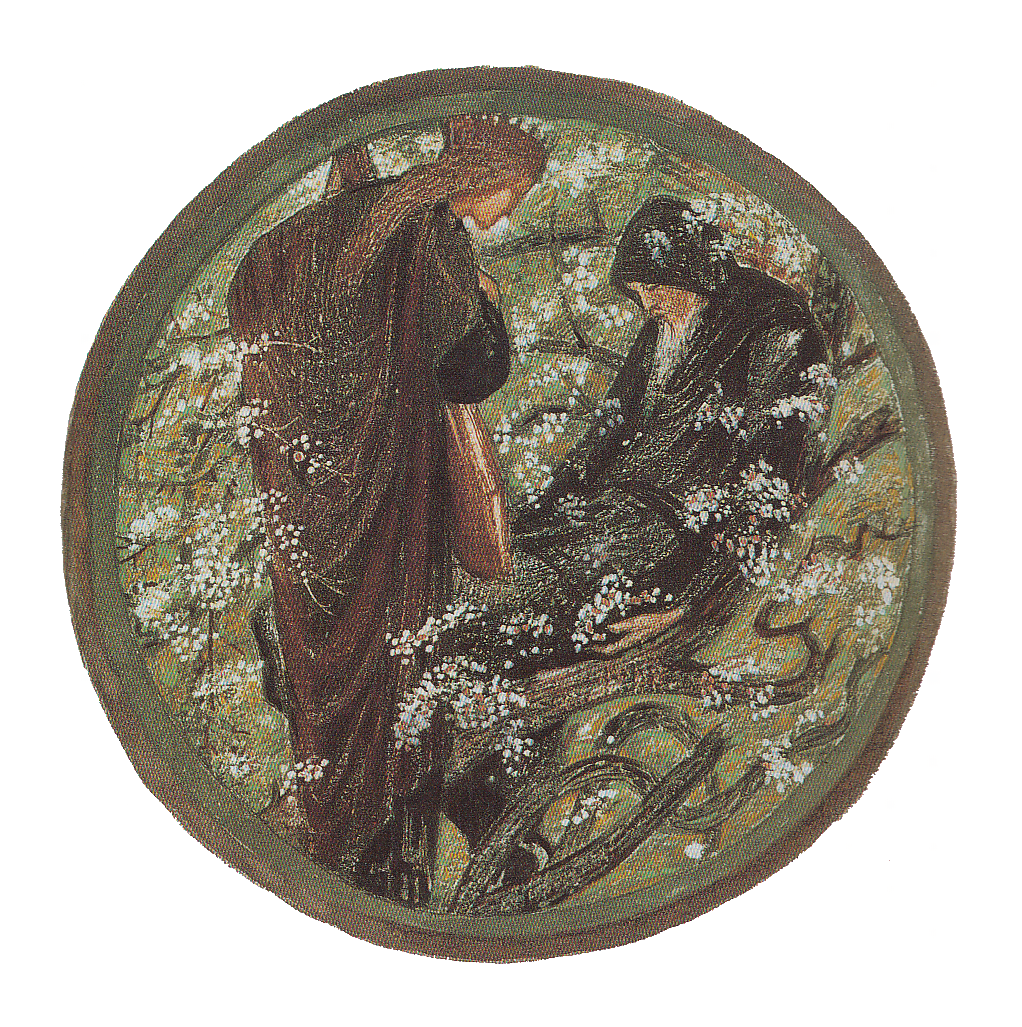
Witches' Tree (1891) by Edward Burne-Jones. The two characters depicted here, Merlin and the witch, are antagonists in Kopernikus.

The notes given by Vivier in the finished manuscript, with English translation below:

Le personnage central est Agni; autour d’elle gravitent des êtres mythiques (représentés par les six autres chanteurs) tirés de l'histoire: Lewis Carroll, Merlin, une sorcière, la Reine de la nuit, un aveugle prophète, un vieux moine, Tristan et Isolde, Mozart, le Maître des eaux, Copernic et sa mère. Ces personnages sont peut-être les rêves d'Agni qui l'accompagnent dans son initiation et finalement dans sa dématérialisation.

The main character is Agni; mystical beings borrowed from stories (represented by the other six singers) gravitate around her: Lewis Carroll, Merlin, a witch, the Queen of the Night, a blind prophet, an old monk, Tristan and Isolde, Mozart, the Master of the Waters, Copernicus and his mother. These characters could be Agni's dreams that follow her during her initiation and finally into her dematerialization.

=== Instrumentation ===
The opera is in a smaller scale compared to other classical operas. It is scored for seven vocalists who double as percussionists (similar to the chamber compositions of George Crumb), and pre-recorded tape.

Percussion
Balinese gong
3 Japanese gongs
Large tam-tam
Tubular bells
Bass drum
Magnetic tape
Crotales
Antique cymbals
Glockenspiel
Tape
Voice
2 Sopranos
Mezzosoprano
Contralto
Tenor
Baritone
Bass

== Synopsis and structure ==
Scene	English translation
Act One
Prélude	Prelude
La Salution	The Greeting
L'agrégation d'Agni	The Union of Agni
La Quête	The Collection
Les Visions	The Visions
La Proclamation de la prière	The Call to Prayer
Discours du sage et préparation à la méditation	Speech of the Sage and Preparation for Meditation
La Solitude d'Agni	The Solitude of Agni
La Meditation	The Meditation
Act Two
Préparation et l'Ultime èpreuve	Preparation and the Final Proof
La Grande Transe de initiés	The Great Trance of the Initiates
Le Duo d'amour	The Love Duet
La Purification	The Purification
L'Ultime Épreuve	The Final Proof
Les Étoiles	The Stars
La Sortie : vers la démáterialisation	The Departure: to Dematerialization
