= Et je reverrai cette ville étrange =

1981 composition by Claude Vivier

Et je reverrai cette ville étrange (English: And I will see this strange city again) is a 1981 work for chamber ensemble by Canadian composer Claude Vivier. It is an extreme manifestation of monody, with all instruments playing in unison with a continuous melodic line throughout the piece. Musicologists generally view this piece as one of the apexes of his timbral concept, jeux de couleurs.

== History ==
Many unused segments from Vivier's 1976 piece Learning were recycled into Et je reverrai. The piece was premiered on 12 February 1982, at the Trinity United Church in Toronto, Ontario by the Arraymusic ensemble.

=== Program notes ===
The notes given by Vivier in the finished manuscript, with English translation below:

Comme le titre suggère, cette oeuvre est un retour vers un certain lieu de ma vie, certaines mélodies — Mélodies qui font en quelque sorte partie de mon passé — La mélancolie provient de mon goût pour les histoires du passé, mes propres histoires. Quelques mélodies sont inscrites dans le silence, dans la continuité du temps — Cette œuvre est un acte de désespoir en ce sens que le création est toujours une tentative de relier le passé et le futur. « Mélancolie et Espoir », pour recréer la continuité que la vie a interrompue.

As the title suggests, this piece is a comeback to a certain spot in my life, certain melodies — Melodies that are somehow part of my past — Melancholia derives from my tastes for past stories, my own stories. Few melodies embedded into silence, into the time continuum — This piece as an act of despair in so far as creation was always trying to link past and future. "Melancholia and Hope," to recreate the time continuum that human life has disrupted.

== Instrumentation ==
The work is written for a mixed ensemble of trumpet, string trio, two keyboards and percussion battery.

Brass

trumpet

Percussion

Balinese gong
Chinese gong
Chang
tam-tam
vibraphone
trompong

Keyboards

celesta
piano

Strings

viola
cello
bass
