= Wo bist du Licht! =

1981 composition by Claude Vivier

Wo bist du Licht! (English: Where are You Light!) is a 1981 piece for mixed orchestra, mezzo-soprano and tape by Canadian composer Claude Vivier. Vivier completed the piece in early 1981, on a commission from the Canadian Broadcasting Corporation. It is dedicated to Rober Racine. The notes given by Vivier in the finished manuscript describe it as follows: "A meditation on human suffering, this piece is intended as one long continuous melody. The music can be perceived from three different aspects: formal, melodic, or textual."

== Instrumentation ==
Percussion

Balinese gong
Chinese gong
tam-tam
tubular bells
drum brakes
magnetic tape

Strings

11 violins
4 violas
3 cellos
2 basses

Voice

mezzo-soprano
