= Anderson Ferrell =

American novelist

- Occupation: Novelist
- Writing career
- Notable awards: Whiting Award (1996)

Anderson Ferrell is an American novelist. He was the winner of a 1996 Whiting Award for his novel Home for a Day.

He is originally from Wilson County, North Carolina.

== Works ==
- Where She Was. Knopf. 1985. ISBN 978-0-394-53521-0.
- Home for the Day Knopf, 1994 reprint. Alyson Books. 1997. ISBN 978-1-55583-429-6.
- Have You Heard. Bloomsbury. 2004. ISBN 978-1-58234-189-7.

== Reviews ==
...Ferrell's mismanaged plot device fails to spoil his novel. His melodious backtracking and sweet-tea atmospherics, along with his catty eye for small-town social distinctions and his keen ear for fence-line gossip, imbue much of Have You Heard with a juicy charm. Like the world at large, though, it would be far better off without gay-baiting politicians and town-square gunfire.

== Awards ==
- Profile at The Whiting Foundation
