= Bowed string instrument extended technique =

Advanced techniques used for the bow on string instruments

String instruments are capable of producing a variety of sounds. Alternative playing techniques, or extended techniques, have been used extensively since the 20th century. Particularly famous examples of string instrument extended technique can be found in the music of composers such as: Sofia Gubaidulina, Kaija Saariaho, Anna Thorvaldsdottir, Andrew Norman, Leilehua Lanzilotti, Krzysztof Penderecki, Witold Lutosławski, George Crumb, and Helmut Lachenmann.

== Bowing techniques ==
=== Bowing the body of the instrument ===
Bowing the body of a string instrument (which can include bowing the sound box, neck, tuning pegs, or scroll) produces a quiet sound whose amplitude differs according to the place bowed, bow pressure and bow speed. At most the sound is a whisper of the bow hair moving over the wood. A good example of this technique in a musical work is Helmut Lachenmann's Toccatina, a piece written in 1986 for solo violin which uses many extended techniques.

=== Bowing on the bridge ===
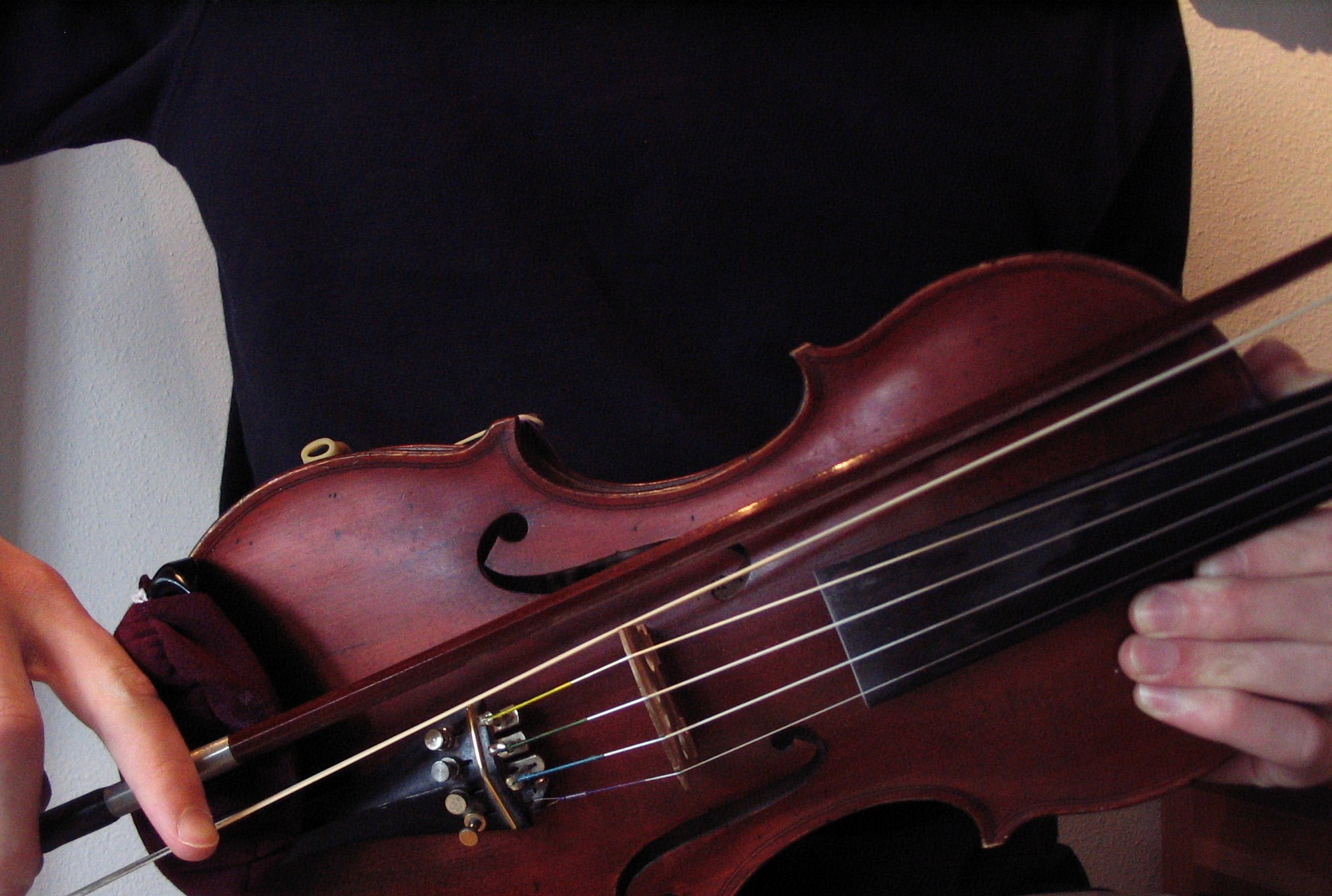
Bowing the bridge, second method

Bowing on the bridge produces two different effects depending on how it is done. If it is done while the performer is in normal playing position, the sound produced is quiet, whispery and a bit squeaky. This method could more properly be called 'bowing over the bridge', since the bow hair is usually still in contact with the strings. Sul ponticello (bowing near the bridge) is a similar, more common technique.

The other method involves the performer holding the instrument in their lap, placing the bow parallel to the instrument and firmly dragging it across the side of the bridge. In this case the sound is loud, high pitched and squeaky. An example of this playing technique can be found in Gérard Grisey's Vortex Temporum (1995). Helmut Lachenmann often uses a soft version of this technique, creating a quiet, white-noise-like sound.

=== Bowing on the fingerboard ===
Bowing on the fingerboard (sul tasto) creates a soft, tone. The effect is a muffled and flute-like sound (the technique is often also called flautando).

=== Bowing the tailpiece ===
Drawing the bow across the tailpiece creates a very quiet resonant sound. Because the tailpiece is large and heavy this sound is general of a quite low pitch.

=== Scratch tone ===
A scratch tone is produced by bowing the instrument in normal playing position, but applying very hard pressure to the bow. This produces an extremely loud and grating sound.

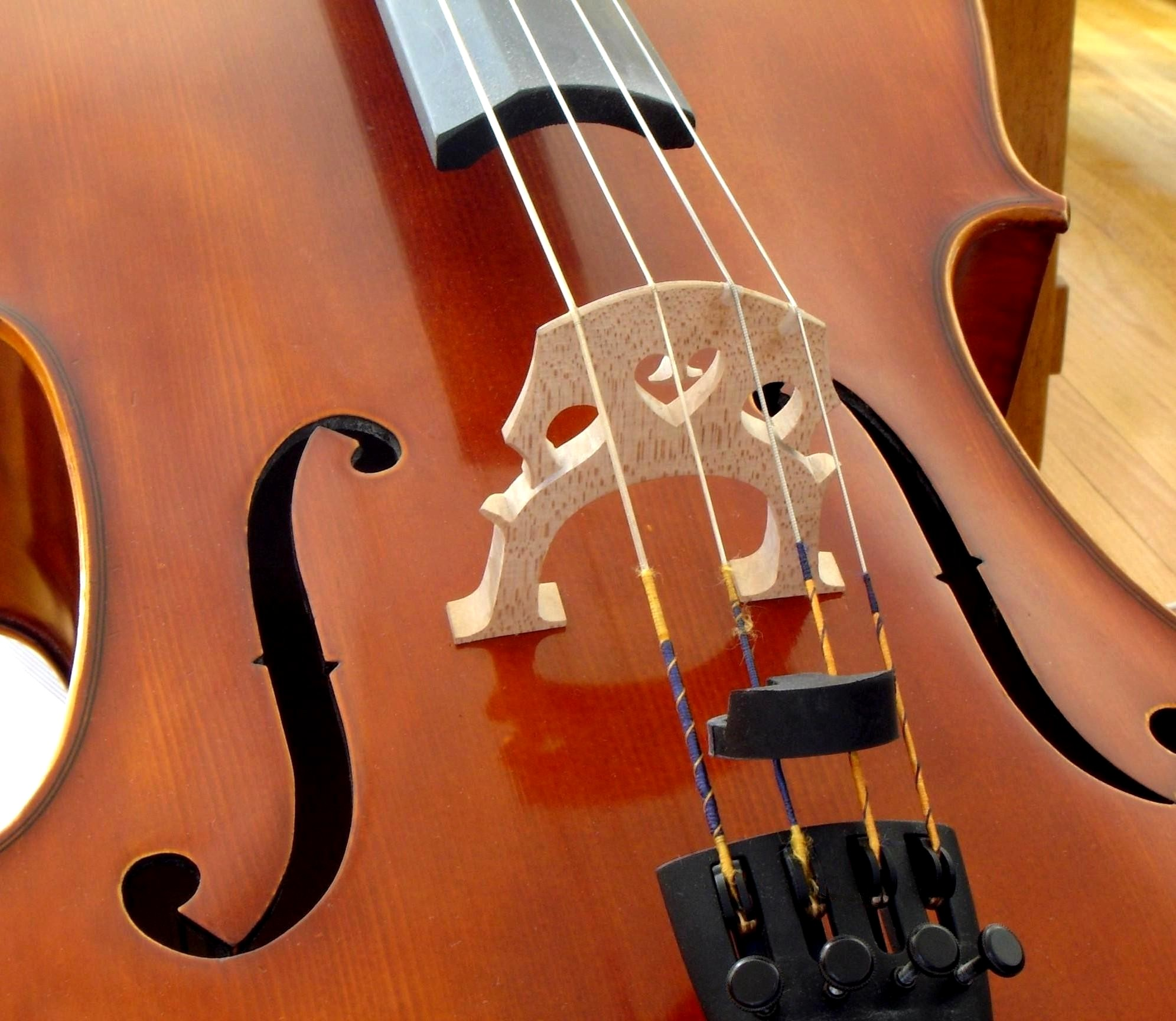
Behind the bridge

=== Bowing behind the bridge ===
This fairly common extended technique involves bowing the instrument on the afterlength, the short length of string behind the bridge. The tone is very high and squeaky. 3rd bridge is a term more used on electric guitars or prepared guitars, but is the same technique. Playing the instrument at a string part behind the bridge causes the opposed part of the string to resonate. The tone is louder at harmonic relations of the bridge string length. On violins the tone can be very high, even above human hearing range. Depending on the instrument the pitch of the tones may or may not be perceived (cellos and double basses are more likely to produce recognizable pitches because of the longer length of their strings). This technique is used extensively in Krzysztof Penderecki's Threnody to the Victims of Hiroshima. Another interesting example is found in Ferde Grofé's Grand Canyon Suite where bowing behind the bridge on a violin cadenza is used in the representation of a donkey's braying.

=== Col legno ===
This technique uses the stick of the bow, where the player flips the bow around so the bow hair is facing up. This technique produces a faint sound.

== Plucking techniques ==
On string instruments plucking the strings is called pizzicato.

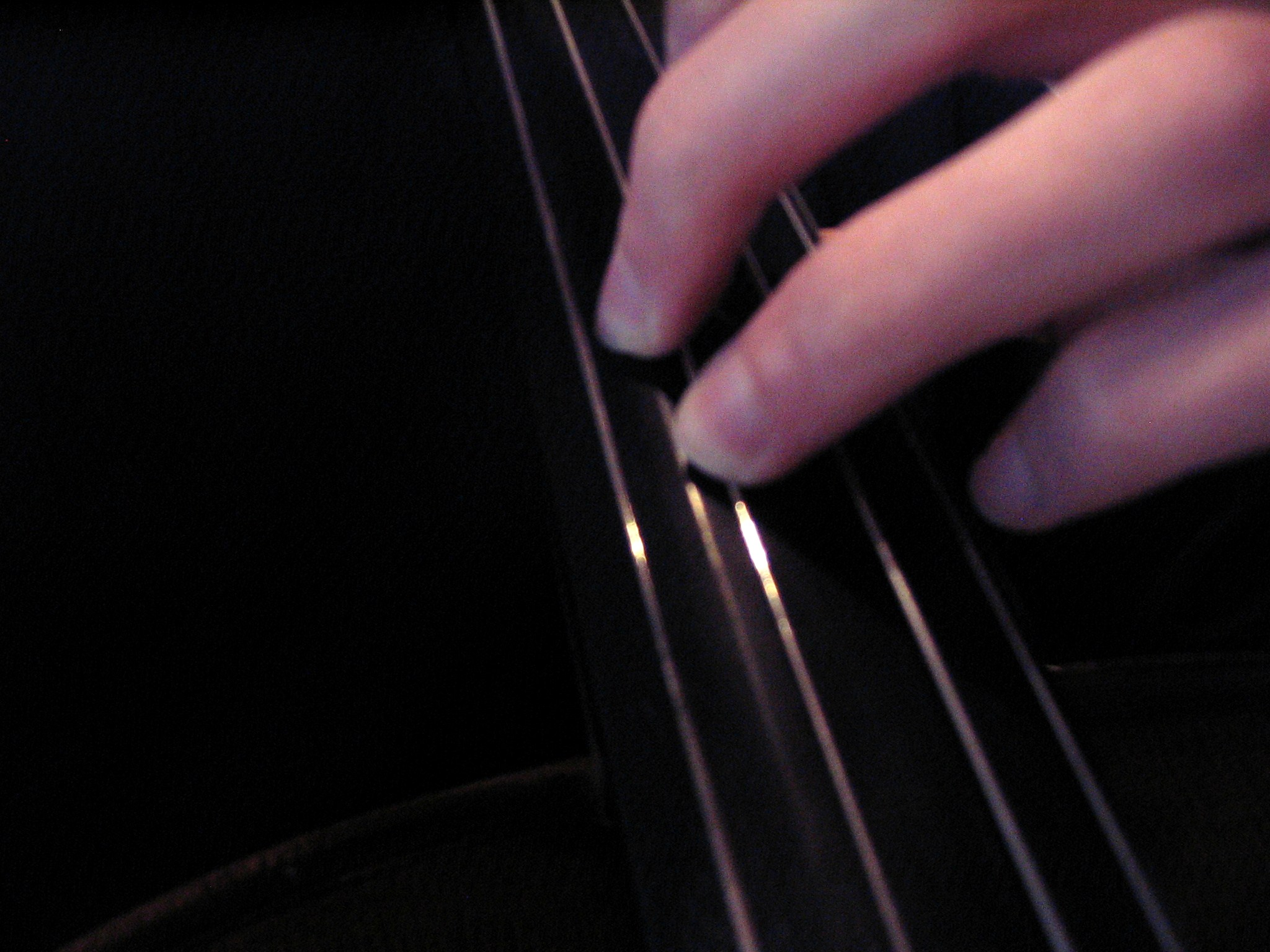
Cellist performing a buzz pizzicato. Note the fingernail placed parallel to the string.

=== Buzz pizzicato ===
Buzz pizzicato is created by placing a left hand finger parallel to the string and plucking the string forcefully so that the plucked string buzzes against the fingerboard. An example of this can be found at the beginning of Zhou Long's Song of the Ch’in (1982).

=== Snap pizzicato ===
Also known as Bartók pizz, snap pizzicato is used extensively in the music of Béla Bartók. (It is commonly thought that Bartók invented the technique, but Heinrich Ignaz Franz Biber first used it in his Battalia à 10.) The technique consists of plucking the string away from the fingerboard with the right hand with sufficient force to cause it to snap back and strike the fingerboard creating a snapping sound in addition to the pitch itself.

=== Nail pizzicato ===
Nail pizzicato is another technique invented and used extensively by Bartók. To perform a nail pizzicato, the performer plucks the string with only the fingernail (in standard string performance technique the player uses the pad of the finger). The resulting sound is a bit more harsh and metallic.

== Tapping techniques ==
=== "Silent" fingering ===
A performer can stop the strings with their left hand in an unusually forceful maneuver and thereby produce a percussive effect. Although quiet, the name “silent” is a misnomer and refers to the fact that the bow is often not applied when performing this effect.

=== Slapping the strings ===
The strings can be struck with the hand or with another object to produce a loud ringing or percussive sound. The performer's right hand is often used for this which leaves the left hand free to finger pitches or dampen the strings.

=== Knocking the instrument ===
String instruments can be tapped just about anywhere. The body of a string instrument, since it is a resonant cavity, can resound quite loudly when struck with the fingers or another object.

== Miscellaneous effects ==
=== “Chewing” ===
An effect sometimes used for humorous effect by string players, “chewing” is performed by loosening the bow hair and placing the bow, bow hair side up, against the back of the instrument. The bow is then rotated causing the bow stick to pop and crunch as it goes over the coarse bow hairs. This effect, which sounds remarkably like a person chewing something crunchy, is fairly quiet and could benefit from amplification.

=== Bow screw glissando ===
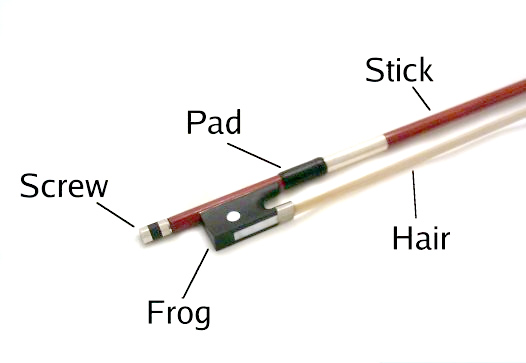
Parts of a violin bow

The bow can be held vertically and the screw of the bow placed firmly against a string either at the location of a fingered note or at some other point. The string can then be plucked with the right hand and the screw of the bow can be simultaneously dragged up or down the string. The effect of this is to produce a quiet rising or falling ping. This effect is used in Helmut Lachenmann's Toccatina.

== See also ==
- List of musical pieces which use extended techniques
