= Lorraine Vaillancourt =

Canadian pianist and conductor

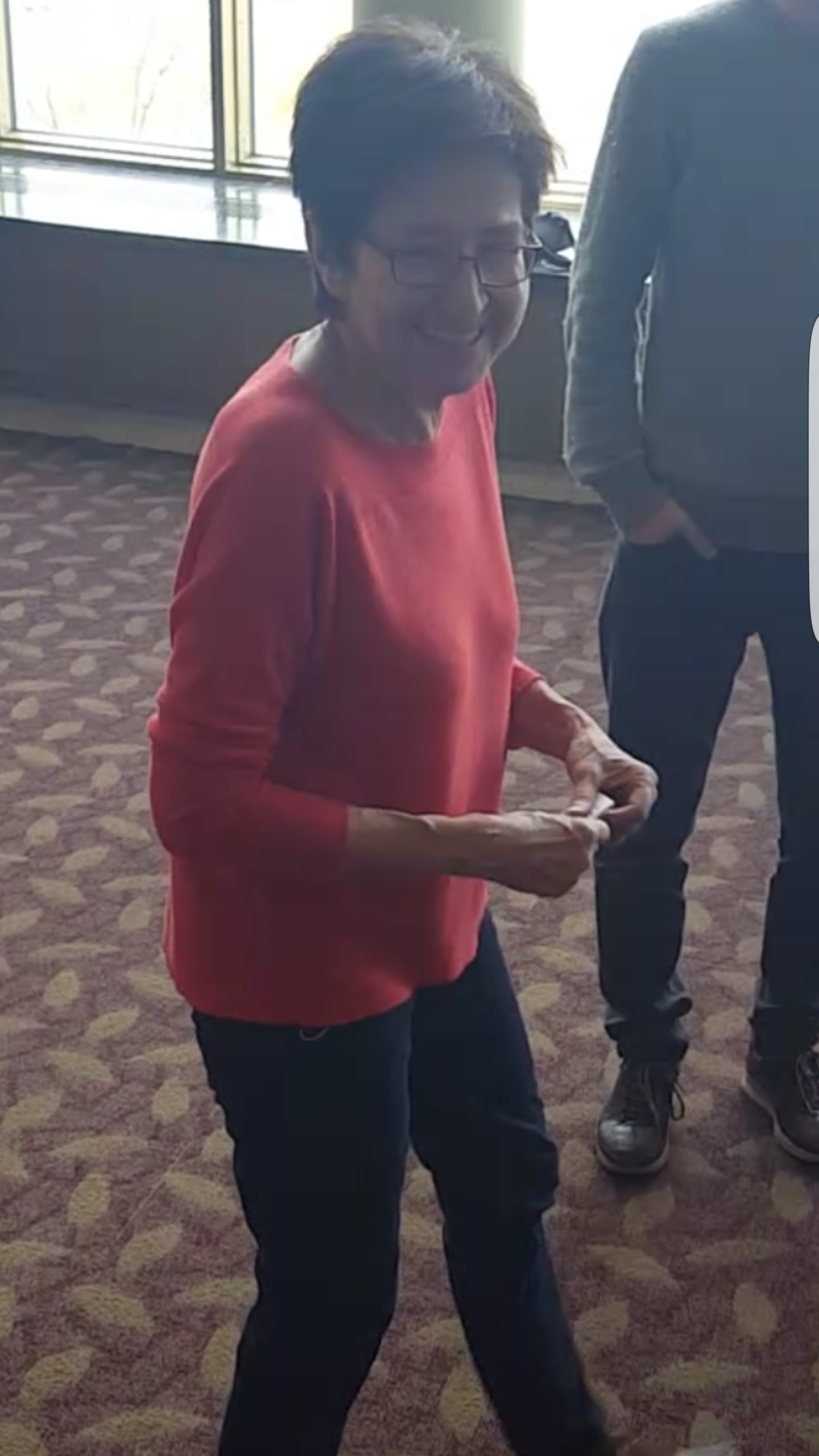
Lorraine Vaillancourt, is a Canadian pianist

Lorraine Vaillancourt, CQ (born September 23, 1947) is a Canadian pianist and conductor living in Quebec.

She was born in Arvida, Quebec and studied with Hélène Landry at the Conservatoire de musique du Québec à Québec and with Pierre Dervaux at the École Normale de Musique de Paris. Vaillancourt studied piano with Yvonne Loriod and Anne-Marie de Lavilléon-Verdier; she studied ondes Martenot with Jeanne Loriod. In 1970 she returned to the University of Montreal with the intention to learn from Serge Garant.

In 1971, Vaillancourt joined the faculty of music at the University of Montreal. From 1971 to 1973, she worked with Bruce Mather and Serge Garant; in 1974, she became director of the University of Montreal's contemporary music workshop, replacing Mather. From 1972 to 1975, she worked at the Atelier-laboratoire of the University. In 1989, she founded the Nouvel Ensemble Moderne, the ensemble-in-residence at the faculty of music at the University of Montreal, which has received numerous awards. She was also a founder of the concert society Événements du neuf.

She has been guest conductor for the Kitchener-Waterloo Symphony Orchestra, the Montreal Symphony Orchestra, the Orchestre Métropolitain and the Quebec Symphony Orchestra. Vaillancourt help found the contemporary music magazine Circuit. She has also conducted various international ensembles including the Ensemble orchestral contemporain in Lyon, Les Percussions de Strasbourg, the Ensemble Sillages in Brest, the Orchestre de Cannes, the RAI National Symphony Orchestra in Turin and the Gulbenkian Orchestra in Lisbon.

From 1998 to 2001, she was president of the Conseil québécois de la musique. From 2001 to 2006, she was a member of the board of the Conseil des arts et des lettres du Québec. She is also a member of the Royal Society of Canada. In 1995, she was named a Woman of Distinction by the YWCA. She conducted Les Percussions de Strasbourg's recording of music by Hugues Dufourt, which received the Prix Charles-Cros. In 2009, she was named an ambassador for the Canadian Music Centre. In 2016, she received the Prix Denise-Pelletier. In 2018, she was made a Knight of the National Order of Quebec.
