= Suzanne Giraud =

French music educator and composer (b.1958)

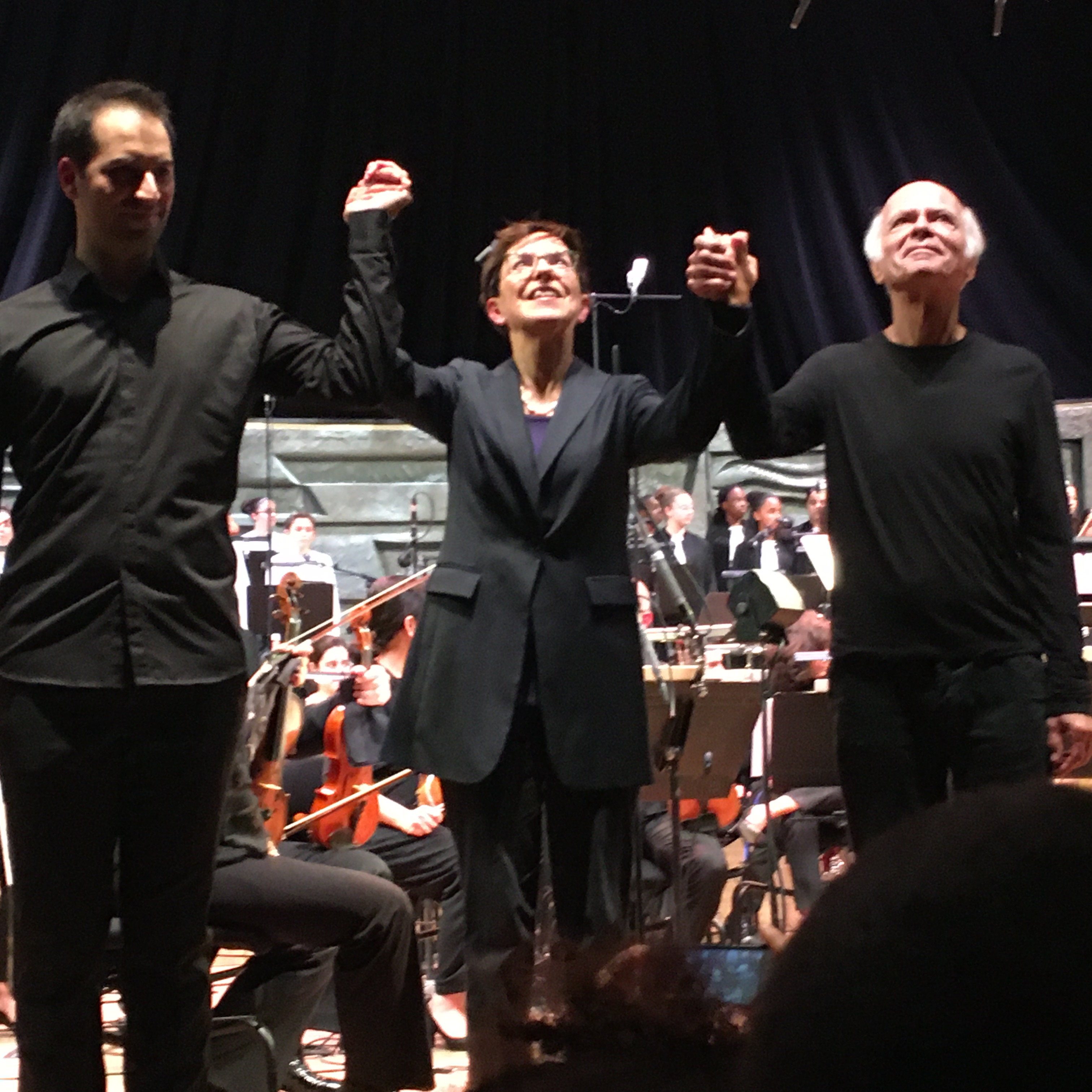
- Suzanne Giraud (middle) alongside Kornilios Michailidis (left) and Pascal Quignard (right) during a concert on 19 October 2019.
- Born: 31 July 1958 (age 68); Metz, France
- Education: Conservatoire de Strasbourg
- Website: suzannegiraud.com

Suzanne Giraud (born 31 July 1958) is a French music educator and composer of contemporary music. Her works are marked by a predilection for percussion, voices and strings; they resonate with her artistic, poetic and architectural inspirations. She has been a member of the Académie Charles Cros since January 2024.

== Biography ==
=== Childhood ===
Born in Metz, Suzanne Giraud grew up in Strasbourg, in an artistic environment with strong musical and literary influences. Her awakening to music was sparked by the works of Bach, Haydn, Beethoven or Chopin, with a strong preference for Mozart very early on.

=== Training ===
At the age of 8, she entered the conservatory of Strasbourg; she studied music theory, piano, violin, viola, musical writing, accompaniment, chamber music, as well as the orchestra as a violist, then as an apprentice chef; she discovered the school of Vienna, Messiaen and his successors, the first door to modernity. After a university degree in linguistics, she entered the CNSMDP in 1977; she followed the lessons of analysis, harmony, counterpoint, orchestration and composition, as well as that of orchestra conducting; she graduated in these disciplines.

Giraud diversified her musical education with Claude Ballif, Jacques Lejeune and Philippe Mion at the Groupe de Recherches Musicales (GRM), Hugues Dufourt, Tristan Murail at l'Itinéraire, Iannis Xenakis. Noticed by Franco Donatoni, Suzanne Giraud entered the Accademia Chigiana in Siena; there she perfected her skills in composition, as well as in conducting with Franco Ferrara.

In 1984, she was appointed for two years at the Villa Medici; in Rome, she met Giacinto Scelsi, with whom she remained close, and participated in the activities of the Scelsi Foundation. She also attended summer school in Darmstadt where she met Morton Feldman, Horatiu Radulescu, Brian Ferneyhough.

=== Career ===
Giraud received important orders from the Ensemble Intercontemporain, Radio France, the French State, Musique Nouvelle en Liberté, Festival Musica de Strasbourg, Dresden Festival, Festival Ars Musica de Bruxelles, ProQuartet, Festival Presences Féminin, The Arditti Quartet, the Manfred Quartet, Festival de Perpignan, Ensemble Orchestral de Paris, Orchestre National de France, Opéra-théâtre de Metz-Métropole, The Danish Chamber Players, and the NYME New York Metropolitan Ensemble.

She has been invited to the Almeida Theatre in London, the Hague Residence Orchestra, the Köln Akademie der Künstler, the Berlin Akademie der Künste, Geneva, Lausanne, Darmstadt, Cardiff, Siena, Saarbrücken, Dresden and Salzburg, as well as in many festivals and seasons in France and Europe, Fribourg International Festival, Festival de la Villa Medicis, Perpignan Aujourd’hui musiques, Festival Musicalta Pfaffenheim, Festival Musica de Strasbourg, and Festival Les Musiques de Marseille.

Her notable collaborations with prestigious ensembles and performers include the Arditti Quartet, the Diotima Quartet, the Manfred Quartet, the Trio Sora, the Trio à cordes de Paris, the Orchestre de Chambre National de Toulouse, the Orchestre d'Auvergne, the Orchestre Philharmonique de Radio France, the Orchestre des Pays de Savoie, Ensemble Accroche-Note, Ensemble de l'Itinéraire, Ensemble Intercontemporain, Ensemble 2E2M, Les Siècles, Les Percussions de Strasbourg, Kent Nagano, Philippe Jaroussky, François-Xavier Roth, Stéphane Tran Ngoc, Anne Gastinel, Thierry Miroglio, Joëlle Léandre, Jean-Philippe Collard, Graziella Contratto, Sandrine Sutter, and Jean-Paul Bonnevalle.

She likes to multiply experiences and compose for diverse ensembles: solo instruments, duets, trios, quartets, quintets, instrumental ensembles or mixing instruments and voices, vocal ensembles, percussion, orchestra, and opera.

Giraud also composes for children. Among her commissions, several educational works in her catalog include Le Singe, la Banquise et le Téléphone portable (The Monkey, the Ice Floe and the Mobile Phone) in 2005, Fables the same year and, in 2019, Perpetuum Mobile for the orchestras of DEMOS Île-de-France.

For two years, from 1991 to 1993, she produced a program on France Musique, Les mots et les notes, in collaboration with Jean-Yves Bosseur, a program dedicated to Renaissance musical Europe, among others.

The Fondazione Isabella Scelsi invited her to Rome in November 2005 for a program of her music and to talk about Giacinto Scelsi, (tribute broadcast live by the RAI).

In 2007/2008, Giraud was composer in residence at the Conservatoire supérieur de Genève, then with the Orchestre d'Auvergne and its conductor Arie van Beek.

=== Teaching ===
Giraud gave her first lessons at the age of 16, in a local cultural youth centre in a Strasbourg district considered «disadvantaged»; for two years, she introduced children to the piano and music. She quickly joined the Conservatory of Strasbourg and taught piano, before going to Île-de-France to teach writing, music history, preparation for the baccalaureate test, analysis.

In Paris, at the CNSMDP, Alain Louvier entrusted her with a multidisciplinary short cycle writing class. She teaches, in particular, the counterpoint of the Renaissance.

She then became director of the conservatory of the 20th arrondissement of Paris where she led the project of classes with adapted theater schedules for schoolchildren and created an electroacoustic creation studio and a computer-assisted synthesis and composition studio.

She returned to pedagogy and joined the Conservatoire à Rayonnement Régional de Paris as a professor of composition and contemporary musical culture. From 2011, she runs a Contemporary Workshop open to everybody, which allows CRR students to understand contemporary music, to develop listening and exchange with living composers, meetings are also open to interested audiences.

== Inspiration ==
Among the sources of inspiration of Suzanne Giraud, literature, architecture, the Renaissance. Marguerite de Navarre, Titian, Caravaggio, Miguel de Cervantes, Mellin de Saint-Gelais, Joachim du Bellay, Michel Leiris, Pascal Quignard, J.R.R.Tolkien, Petrarch, Edgar Allan Poe, are some of her references.

Her catalogue reflects this: L’Offrande à Vénus, inspired by a painting by Titian; Jaffa, on a painting by Antoine-Jean Gros; To one in Paradise, on a poem by Edgar Poe; Qu’as-tu vu dans le vaste monde ? from Mellin de Saint-Gelais; Petrarca, collection of madrigals on Petrarch sonnets; La musique nous vient d’ailleurs, from The Lord of the Rings by J.R.R. Tolkien, etc.

She has worked with contemporary authors; on five occasions, with Pascal Quignard, including Johannisbaum in 2011, Le chant du Marais in 2017, Les enfants du Marais in 2019; with Dominique Fernandez for the opera Caravaggio of which she has co-wrote the libretto and where Philippe Jaroussky played the title role; with Olivier Py, for the creation of the opera Le Vase de Parfums. Practicing poetry herself, she sets her own verses to music (Bleu et ombre, Liesse)

== Works ==
Influenced by classical and contemporary literature, the arts, and architecture, and trained in linguistics and diverse of musical writing techniques, from the polyphony of the Renaissance to spectral music, Suzanne Giraud's compositions have been characterized by their density and complexity.

Each composition is created ex nihilo, without any repetition of what was imagined before. Suzanne Giraud says she needs this novelty, a driving force for dynamism and an antidote to boredom. Her inspiration is mainly literary.

She is familiar with orchestral instrumentation, having taken part in various ensembles as a violist from a very early age. She learned balance with the other orchestra sections, the strings, and also winds, woodwinds, brass, percussion, as well as understanding the work of the conductor.

She also has a predilection for voice. She deciphered the piano parts at the same time as the voice parts, encouraged to sing herself by her deciphering teacher. With one of her sisters, she performed most of the Lieder of Franz Schubert, Robert Schumann, Hugo Wolf, Johannes Brahms, helped by her practice of German.

== Awards ==
Her works have received several awards: 1987, SACEM Georges Enesco Award 1988, Georges-Bizet Prize of the Academy of Fine Arts 1989, selection of the UNESCO International Forum Two selections from the International Society for Contemporary Music (SIMC) (Budapest 1986 and Manchester 1998).

== Catalogue ==
=== Solo ===
- 2011, Les Parhélies, piano, 10' - Dedicatee and Sponsor : Saint-Gobain - Creation : December 4, 2012, Paris Cité de la Musique, Hugues Leclère
- 2005, Sensations du réveil, horn, 10′
- 2002, Afin que sans cesse je songe, flute, 22′ - Creation : July 18, 2002, Festival Musicalta Pfaffenheim, Berten d’Hollander
- 1999, Éclosion, guitar, 8′ - Dedicatee : Vladimir Mikulka - Creation : April 1, 2000, Fribourg International Festival, Vladimir Mikulka
- 1999, Zéphyr, piano, 15′ - Dedicatee and Sponsor: Georges Kan - Creation : November 20, 2000, Festival Aujourd’hui Musiques de Perpignan, D. Taouss
- 1996, Envoûtements, violin, 8′30 - Dedicatee : Irvine Arditti - Creation : September 29, 1996, Strasbourg. Festival Musica, Irvine Arditti
- 1990, L’œil and le jour, percussion, 14′
- 1983, Tentative univers, percussion, 40’ - Creation : June 23, 1983, Radio France, Daniel Ciampolini

=== Duet ===
- 2020, Orée, flute & piano, 8′30 ‘’ - Dedicatee : Francesca Caccini - Sponsor : Festival Présences féminines - Creation : October 22, 2021
- 2013, Es steht das nichts in der Mandel, 2 violas, 13′ - Sponsor : Odile Auboin & Carole Dauphin - Creation : December 19, 2013, Conservatoire à Rayonnement régional de Paris, Odile Auboin, Carole Dauphin
- 2008, Cent-trois notes, violin & clarinet, 5′ - Dedicatee and Sponsor : Erik Carlson - Creation : New York, NYME New York Mandropolitan Ensemble
- 2004, D’une hélice, flute & harp, 10' - Dedicatee and Sponsor : Isabelle Giraud - Creation : July 24, 2004, Usson-en-Forez, Isabelle Giraud, Elise Estavoyer
- 2002, Duos pour Prades, Clarinet & cello, 16′ - Dedicatee and Sponsor : Pablo Casals in memoriam, Festival Pablo Casals de Prades - Creation : August 5, 2003, Prades, Festival Pablo Casals, Michel Landhiec and Arto Noras
- 2000, Élaboration, viola & piano, 10′ - Dedicatee and Sponsor : Vincent Royer and Jean-Philippe Collard - Creation : February 28, 2001, Köln Akademie der Künstler, Vincent Royer, Jean-Philippe Collard
- 1997, Envoûtements II, Flute & marimba, 10′ - Dedicatee : Jacques Ménandrey - Sponsor : Ensemble Orchestral de Paris - Creation : March 20, 1997, Paris Opéra comique, Clara Novakova, Jean Geoffroy

=== Duet with voice ===
- 2018, L’Albatros, baritone & violin, 6′30’’ - Creation : January 29, 2019, Paris, Stéphane Tran Ngoc
- 2002, Le Bel été, baritone & piano, 8' - Text : Yves Bonnefoy - Sponsor : La Péniche Opéra - Creation : May 23, 2003, La Péniche Opéra, Matthieu Lécroart, baritone and Emmanuel Olivier, piano
- 1993, Bleu and ombre, voice & double bass, 12′ - Dedicatee & Sponsor : Joëlle Léandre, French state - Creation : June 22, 1994, Berlin Akademie der Künste, Joëlle Léandre

=== Trio ===
- 2023, Caressant, piano, violin & cello, 10′ - Sponsor : Radio France - Creation : April 10/16, 2023, La Seine Musicale – Maison de la Radio et de la Musique – France Musique, Trio Sora, Fanny Fheodoroff, violin; Angèle Legasa, cello; Pauline Chenais, piano
- 2017, D’un vanneur de blé aux vents, violin, cello & clarinet, 6′ - Creation : March 9, 2017, Théâtre Rutebeuf, Clichy
- 1995, Orphée, Flute, oboe & cello, 5’ - Creation : July 12, 1995, Festival off d’Avignon, Ensemble Carpe Diem
- 1991, Trio à cordes, violin, viola & cello, 14’ - Dedicatee /Sponsor : Charles FREY, Radio France Présences - Creation : January 11, 1992, Radio France, Trio à cordes de Paris
- 1989, Épisode en forme d’oubli, clarinet B-flat, marimba & double bass 4 strings, 5’ - Sponsor : Centre Acanthes - Creation : July 24, 1989, Avignon Palais des Papes, Ensemble du CNSM

=== Trio with voice ===
- 1997, Envoûtements III, soprano, clarinet & percussion, 10’ - Libretto : Jeremy Drake - Sponsor : Dresden Festival - Creation : October 3, 1997, Dresden, Ensemble Accroche-note
- 1982/86, Voici la lune, mezzo-soprano, flute & piano, 8’ - Creation : July 28, 1986, Darmstadt, L. Jablow, Céline Nessi, T. Welbourne

=== Quartet ===
- 2020, Impulse, 2 violins, viola & cello, 23′ - Sponsor : Opéra de Limoges, festival Présences féminines & ProQuartand – Centre européen de musique de chambre - Creation : July 29, 2021, Opéra de Limoges, quatuor Tana
- 2006, Augenmusik, 2 violins, viola & cello, 6′ - Dedicatee & Sponsor : 20 ans du Quatuor Manfred - Creation : June 16, 2006, Dijon, Quatuor Manfred
- 2004, Quatuor n°3 Peter Schlemihl, 2 violins, viola & cello, 16’ - Dedicatee & Sponsor : Quatuor Manfred - Creation : June 24, 2004, Dijon, Quatuor Manfred
- 1997, Envoûtements IV, 2 violins, viola & cello, 10′ - Dedicatee : Irvine Arditti - Creation : October 4, 1997, Strasbourg Musica, Quatuor Arditti
- 1995, Comme un murmure amoureux, Flute, oboe, French horn & cello, 11’ - Creation : June 13, 1995, Cluj Roumanie, ensemble 2E2M, dir. Paul Mefano
- 1991, Le rivage des transes, 2 pianos & 2 percussions, 15’30 - Sponsor : Ville d’Orly - Creation : September 21, 1992, Orly, Pascal Devoyon, François Kerdoncuff, Vincent Bauer, Luc Canjardjis
- 1989, Fantasia, 2 oboe, bassoon & harpsichord, 5’ - Sponsor : French state
- 1983, Regards sur le jardin d’Eros, 2 violins, viola & cello, 35’ - Creation : June 20, 1984, Radio France, Ami Flammer, Béatrice Gaugué-Natorp, Marie-Christine Witterkoer, Pierre Strauch

=== Musical ensemble ===
- 2010, L’Amitié, bassoon solo, flute, clarinet, guitar & double bass, 5′ - Dedicatee : Christophe Tessier - Creation : December 15, 2010, Paris, Christophe Tessier, CMA20 musicians
- 2007, Assemblages, 2 violas, 2 violins & 1 cello, 17′ - Dedicatee & Sponsor : Art, Culture and Tradition Saint Paul de Vence - Creation : March 8, 2008, Saint-Paul de Vence, Quatuor de Cannes
- 2005, Envoûtements VIII, 8 cellos, 18′ - Sponsor : Festival de Beauvais - Creation : October 5, 2005, Beauvais Festival, Octuor de violoncelles de Beauvais
- 2005, Envoûtements VII, Soprano, oboe, bassoon, trumpet, viola, cello & double bass, 16’ - Sponsor : Ensemble orchestral Contemporain - Creation : May 21, 2005, Festival Les Musiques de Marseille, Ensemble Orchestral Contemporain, dir Fabian Panisello
- 2003, Envoûtements VI, 6 percussionists, 17’ - Sponsor : Festival Musica and les percussions de Strasbourg - Creation : October 8, 2003, Festival Musica de Strasbourg, Les Percussions de Strasbourg
- 2001, Envoûtements V, guitar, 2 violin, viola & cello, 13’30’’ - Sponsor : Proquartand, Ars Musica and GMEM Creation : March 2, 2002, Château de Fontainebleau, Caroline Delume, guitar and quatuor Diotima
- 1995, La Musique nous vient d’ailleurs, 1.1.1.1. french horn.2vl.1.1.1, 15’30’’ - Dedicatee : Huguette Giraud - Sponsor : Radio France - Creation : April 27, 1996, Radio France, Ensemble Denojours, dir. Jean-Marie Adrien
- 1990, Le Rouge des profondeurs, Clarinet, french horn, percussion, synthesizer, violin & cello, 12’ - Dedicatee : Ensemble TM+ - Creation : May 14, 1991, Radio France, Ensemble TM+, dir. Laurent Cuniot
- 1988, L’Aube sur le désir, 2 flutes, harp, violin, viola & cello, 18’ - Dedicatee & Sponsor : Charles Chaynes, Radio France - Creation : December 6, 1988, Radio France, Pierre Yves Artaud, Nicolas Brochot, trio à cordes de Paris, dir. Suzanne Giraud
- 1987, Contrées d’un rêve, 2 flutes, 2 clarinets, 2 trumpets, 1 trombonn, 2 perc, 1 piano (cel), cordes (1.1.1.1.1), 21’ - Dedicatee & Sponsor : Ensemble InterContemporain - Creation : December 14, 1987, Paris Centre Pompidou, Ensemble Intercontemporain, dir. Kent Nagano
- 1985, L’offrande à Vénus, flute (pic, flA), clarinet, percussion, harp, 2 violins, viola & cello, 6’45’’ - Creation : May 23, 1986, Paris, Centre Pompidou, Ensemble 2E2M, dir. Georges-Élie Octors
- 1984, Ergo sum, flute, english horn, french horn, 3 percussions, piano, 3 violins, 3 violas & 2 double basses, 17’ - Creation : February 1, 1985, Paris Centre Pompidou, Ensemble de l’Itinéraire, dir. Farhad Mechkat
- 1983, Homo homini lupus, 3 flutes, 3 clarinets & 2 double basses, 15’ - Creation : August 18, 1983, Sienne, Ensemble de l’Accademia Chigiana, dir. Alain Meunier

=== Musical ensemble and vocal music ===
- 2020, Le Concert, countertenor, theorbo, harpsichord, baroque violin & viola da gamba, 6′40’’ - Creation : April 5, 2022, Auditorium Landowski
- 2017, Le Chant du Marais, narrator, soprano & cello, 30′ - Libretto : Pascal Quignard - Creation : April 21, 2017, Festival Raccord(s), Pascal Quignard, Marie Vialle, Maria Villanueva, Patrick Langot
- 2011, Johannisbaum, 2 sopranos, 1 mezzo-soprano & cello, 13′ - Text : Pascal Quignard - Dedicatee & Sponsor : Les Voix du Prieuré - Creation : June 8, 2011, Le Bourgand-du-Lac, Chœur Bernard Tétu
- 2006, Rimbaud, Mezzosoprano, flute, viola & piano, 13′ - Text : Arthur Rimbaud - Creation : May 16, 2009, à Paris, La Péniche-Opéra
- 2002, Au commencement était le Verbe, 12 mixed voices & 6 percussionists, 23’ - Sponsor : Noël en Alsace - Creation : December 21, 2002, Guebwiller, Couvent de Dominicains, Chœur de chambre de Strasbourg & Percussions de Strasbourg, dir Catherine Bolzinger
- 1995, Œdipe, baritone-bass and 12 mixed voices, oboe, 2 clarinets, 2 bassoons, trumpet & 2 trombones, 32′
- 1985, La dernière lumière, soprano and ensemble, 11′ - Text : Ivan Goran Kovačić - Sponsor : Ensemble l’Itinéraire - Creation : June 15, 1985, Festival de la Villa Medicis, Evelyne Razimowski, soprano; Ensemble L’itinéraire, dir Yves PRIN

=== Vocal music ===
- 2016, Frère and sœur, mixed chorus – S1 S2 A1 A2 T1 T2 B1 B2, 5′30’’ - Text : Michel Leiris - Sponsor : ERDA accentus - Creation : : May 4, 2017, le Jeune Chœur de Paris
- 2012, Stances du revenant, chœur d’hommes, 8′ - Text : Mary Shelley - Creation : October 8, 2016 Chambéry, Espace Malraux – Chœur Britten, dir. Nicole Corti
- 2009, Psaume CXXXVII, mixed chorus (12 minimum), 17′ - Creation : July 20, 2010, Bourges, Sequenza 9.3, dir Catherine Simonpiandri

=== Concerto ===
- 2016, La Rivière, bassoon solo & ensemble : flute, clarinet, harp, piano, violin, viola & cello, 18′30’’ - Sponsor : the Danish Chamber Players - Creation : May 31, 2017, Kumus, Danemark
- 2014, Le Dauphin, violin, flute, clarinet, bassoon, harp, piano, viola & cello, 22′ - Dedicatee : Stéphane Tran Ngoc - Sponsor : The Danish Chamber Players - Creation : August 2, 2014, Nancyphonies
- 2007, Quatre Fluides, clarinet and string orchestra, 16′ - Sponsor : Orchestre d’Auvergne - Creation : December 18, 2007, Clermont-Ferrand, Michel Landhiec, clarinet; Orchestre d’Auvergne dir. Arie Van Beek
- 2006, Stereo space concerto, piano, 2 flutes, clarinet, 2 french horns, 2 percussions, 2 viola, 2 cellos & double bass, 21′ - Dedicatee : Dimitris Saroglou - Sponsor : TM+ Creation : May 18/19, 2008, Nanterre and Saint-Denis-le-Ferment, TM+, Dimitris Saroglou, dir. Laurent Cuniot
- 2004, Concerto for cello, cello and orchestra, 21′ - Dedicatee : Anne Gastinel - Sponsor : M.N.L - Creation : February 1, 2005, Annemasse, Anne Gastinel, Orchestre Pays de Savoie, dir. Graziella Contratto
- 2002, Qu’as-tu vu dans le vaste monde ?, 2 piccolo trumpets, baritone, 2 oboes, 2 bassoons, percussion, clavier, 2 violins, viola, cello & double bass, 11′ - Sponsor : Radio France - Creation : November 2002, France Musique & France Culture, Vincent Le Texier, Pierre Gilland, Ensemble Ars Nova, dir. Philippe Nahon
- 1991, Crier vers l’horizon, bassoon and ensemble, 10′ - Sponsor : Ensemble Intercontemporain - Creation : February 25, 1993, Paris IRCAM, Paul Riveaux, bassoon; EIC, dir David Robertson

=== Orchestra ===
- 2008, Écho réplique, little orchestra, 15′ - Sponsor : Orchestre d’Auvergne - Creation : March 18th 2008, Clermont-Ferrand, Orchestre d’Auvergne, dir. Jurjen HEMPEL
- 1999, To one in paradise, mezzosoprano and orchestra, 18’ - Dedicatee : in memory of Gérard Rippe - Sponsor : Radio France - Creation : September 24, 1999, Orchestre Philharmonique de Radio France, dir. Laurent Cuniot
- 1999, Décision/Indécision, wind orchestra, 4 timbales, 7’ - Dedicatee : Nestor Draculescu - Sponsor : Orchestre de Picardie - Creation : February 1, 2000, Amiens, Orchestre de Picardie dir. Edmon Colomer
- 1998, Ton cœur sur la porte du ciel, orchestra, 17′ - Sponsor : Musique Nouvelle en Liberté - Creation : May 12, 1998, Poitiers, Orchestre de Poitou-Charentes, dir. Louis Langrée
- 1984, Terre Essor, orchestra, 20’ - Sponsor : Unesco - Enregistrement : May 12, 1987, Radio France, Orchestre Philharmonique de Radio France, dir Michel Tabachnik - Creation : December 1989 à La Haye, Residentie Orkest, dir Jean-Paul Penin

=== Orchestra & choir ===
- 2001, Jaffa, Mezzo-soprano, chœur and orchestra, 21’ - Dedicatee : according to Bonaparte visitant les Pestiférés de Jaffa d’A.J. Gros - Sponsor : Association des anciens internes des hôpitaux de Paris

=== Pedagogical works ===
- 2022, Liesse, 3 quintets and orchestra, 8′ - Sponsor : Orchestre Français des Jeunes - Creation : December 11, 2022, La Philharmonie de Paris, Orchestre Français des Jeunes, Dir Michael Schønwandt
- 2019, Les Enfants du Marais, narrator, 2 soprani, viola, maîtrise d’enfants, orchestra (2 2 2 2 – 2 2 1 – 2 perc – 6 5 4 3 2), 50′ - Libretto : Pascal Quignard - Sponsor : Radio France - Creation : October 19, 2019, Maison de la Radio et de la Musique, Pascal Quignard, Maya Villanueva, Elodie Fonnard, Pauline Sikirdji, Maîtrise de Radio France, dir Morgan Jourdain; Orchestre Philharmonique de Radio France, dir Kornilios Michailidis
- 2018, Perpanduum Mobile, orchestra, 8′40 - Sponsor : Philharmonie de Paris – Démos - Creation : June 22, 2019, Cité de la musique, Philharmonie de Paris – Démos Paris
- 2005, Le singe, la banquise and le téléphone portable, children, 4 cellos, 30′ - Sponsor : Rencontres de Beauvais - Creation : May 10, 2005, Théâtre de Beauvais, École Claude Debussy and Violoncelles de l’Octuor de Beauvais
- 2005, Fables, narrator, chœur d’enfants and orchestra, 11′ - Text : Jean de La Fontaine - Sponsor : Orchestre National d’Ile-de-France - Creation : January 14/17, 2006, François Castang, narrator, Orchestre Nationale d’Ile-de-France, dir. Philippe Cambreling
- 1994, Non, peut-être, orchestra à cordes, 6.6.4.4.2, 12’ - Dedicatee : Adalbert-Gautier Hamman - Sponsor : Ville d’Achères - Creation : October 30, 1997, Toulouse Capitole, Orchestre de Chambre National de Toulouse, dir. Alain Moglia
- 1992, L’âge de colère, 3 flutes, 3’30 - Creation : January 12, 1993, Orléans, Trio d’Argent
- 1987, Promenade du soir, viola and piano, 3’ - Sponsor : Editions Billaudot - Creation : June 1988, Paris, Pierre Henri Xuereb, B. Vaud

=== Opera ===
- 2008/2012, Caravaggio, mezzo-soprano, countertenor, tenor, baritone, bass, chamber chor, baroque/modern orchestra, 2h15′ - Libretto : Dominique Fernandez & Suzanne Giraud - Dedicatee /Sponsor : Opera-théâtre de Metz-Métropole - Creation : April 6, 2012, Metz, Maria Riccarda Wesseling, Philippe Jaroussky, Anders J.Dahlin, Alain Buand, Luc Bertin-Hugault, Les Siècles, François-Xavier Roth, Chœurs de l’Opéra de Metz
- 2009, Neuf-cent-vingt-six and demi, opéra "de poche", 4 singers & piano, 24′ - Libretto : Jean-Nestor Debazille - Dedicatee & Sponsor : MNL and La Péniche Opéra - Creation : February 1, 2010, La Péniche Opéra, Paul-Alexandre Dubois, Christophe Crapez, Johann Le Roux, Amira Selim, Caroline Dubost
- 2004, Le Vase de parfums, 5 singers, 20 instruments, 1h30' - Libretto : Olivier Py - Dedicatee /Sponsor : French state - Creation : October 6, 2004, Nantes, Sandrine Sutter, Jean-Paul Bonnevalle, Mary Saint-Palais, EOC, A Sei Voci, dir Daniel Kawka, staging and lights Olivier PY
