= Ensems =

Ensems (Valencian pronunciation: [enˈsems], meaning "jointly, at the same time") is an annual contemporary classical music festival that takes place every spring in Valencia. Founded in 1978, it is the oldest contemporary music festival in Spain. It centers mostly in chamber music due to budget restrictions.

Works by composers such as John Cage, Elliott Carter, Brian Ferneyhough, Hans Werner Henze, Helmut Lachenmann, Krzysztof Penderecki, Salvatore Sciarrino or Iannis Xenakis have been given their Spanish premiere throughout the festival's history.

== Editions ==
=== 2009 ===
- Subject: Me falta una oreja (I lack an ear)

Composer	World premieres	National premieres
(Spain) Manuel Añón (Spain) María José Belenguer (Spain) Adrià Borredà (Brazil) Aurélio Edler (Spain) Matías Far (Spain) Carlos Fontcuberta (Spain) Hermes Luaces (Spain) Juan María Martínez Cue (Puerto Rico) José Javier Peña Aguayo (Spain) Josep Planells (Spain) David del Puerto (Mexico) Marcela Rodríguez (Poland) Jagoda Szmytka	El sueño de Tántalo; Tres miradas de un instante Sierpes salvajes Punto rosso sull'oceano Concetto su tre (...a la luna de Valencia); Sobre un instante presagiado El rumor de las sombras Somos mar Cemítrico; Stramps; Céfiro; Trio verb(a)renne life!	
(France) Hugues Dufourt (France) Philippe Hurel (Mexico) Gabriela Ortiz		Saxophone Quartet; Six miniatures en trompe-l'oeil Trifolium

Other performed composers
(Spain) Xavier Benguerel
(Spain) Salvador Brotons
(Cuba) Leo Brouwer
(Spain) Emilio Calandín
(Spain) César Cano
(United States) Elliott Carter
(France) Geoffroy Drouin
(Spain) Gabriel Erkoreka
(United Kingdom) Brian Ferneyhough
(Spain) Ángel Lluís Ferrando
(United States) Joshua Fineberg
(Spain) Francisco Guerrero
(Spain) Cristóbal Halffter
(Germany) Hans Werner Henze
(Spain) Ramón Humet
(Austria) Thomas Larcher
(Hungary) György Ligeti
(Spain) Tomás Marco
(Spain) José Antonio Orts
(Spain) Alberto Posadas
(Spain) Claudio Prieto
(Spain) Ramón Ramos
(Spain) Vicente Roncero
(Spain) Carles Santos
(Spain) Mauricio Sotelo
(Germany) Karlheinz Stockhausen
(Japan) Toru Takemitsu
(Spain) Andrés Valero
(Spain) José Zárate

=== 2010 ===
- Subject: Pop
  - Composers
- (Spain) Germán Alonso
- (Mexico) Javier Álvarez
- (Spain) Manuel Añón
- (Italy) Luciano Berio
- (Spain) Enrique Busto
- (Spain) Fran Cabeza de Vaca
- (Portugal) Carlos Caires
- (Spain) Emilio Calandín
- (Spain) Alberto Carretero
- (Italy) Aureliano Cattaneo
- (United States) Michael Daugherty
- (United Kingdom) Tansy Davies
- (Spain) José Miguel Fayos
- (Spain) Carlos Fontcuberta
- (Spain) Josep Lluís Galiana
- (Argentina) Osvaldo Golijov
- (Spain) Vicent Gómez
- (Spain) Gregorio Jiménez
- (France) Pierre Jodlowski
- (Greece) Panayiotis Kokoras
- (Mexico) Mario Lavista
- (Brazil) Rodrigo Lima
- (Portugal) José Júlio Lopes
- (Greece) Theodore Lotis
- (Spain) Roberto López Corrales
- (Spain) José Manrique
- (France) Antony Maubert
- (Spain) José López Montes
- (Greece) Manolis Manousakis
- (Spain) Juan María Martínez Cué
- (Argentina) Martín Matalón
- (Spain) Elena Mendoza
- (Greece) Andreas Mniestris
- (Spain) Josué Moreno
- (Germany) Alva Noto
- (Portugal) João Pedro Oliveira
- (Spain) Josep Planells
- (France) Jean-Claude Risset
- (Spain) Manuel Rodríguez Valenzuela
- (Italy) Fausto Romitelli
- (Argentina) Gabriel Santander
- (Sweden) Albert Schnelzer
- (Spain) Jesús Torres
- (Serbia) Isidora Žebeljan

=== 2011 ===
- Subject: Love Songs
  - Composers
- (Spain) Germán Alonso
- (Greece) Georges Aperghis
- (Spain) Alfredo Aracil
- (United Kingdom) Natasha Barrett
- (Italy) Pierluigi Billone
- (Spain) Fran Cabeza de Vaca
- (Spain) César Camarero
- (Italy) Aureliano Cattaneo
- (Spain) Jordi Cervelló
- (Spain) Dominique Clément
- (Spain) José Miguel Fayos
- (Spain) Carmen Fernández Vidal
- (France) Jean-Charles François
- (Spain) Cristóbal Halffter
- (Spain) Gregorio Jiménez
- (Spain) Miguel Gálvez-Taroncher
- (Spain) Voro García
- (Finland) Magnus Lindberg
- (Argentina) Demián Luna
- (Spain) Enrique Macías
- (Hungary) Miklós Maros
- (United Kingdom) Peter Maxwell Davies
- (Spain) Rafael Murillo
- (Sweden) Kent Olofsson
- (Mexico) Hilda Paredes
- (Spain) Eduardo Pérez Maseda
- (Spain) Alberto Posadas
- (United States) Roger Reynolds
- (Germany) Wolfgang Rihm
- (Spain) Miquel Roger
- (Spain) Jesús Rueda
- (Spain) Albert Sanz
- (Spain) Enrique Sanz-Burguete
- (Spain) Josep Soler
- (Spain) Mauricio Sotelo
- (Spain) Jesús Torres
- (Spain) Andrés Valero
- (Spain) Luis Yuste
