= Spectral music =

Musical composition practice

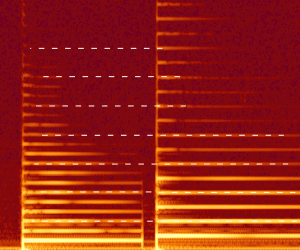
A spectrogram of a violin playing a note and then a perfect fifth above it with the shared partials highlighted by the white dashes (harmonic spectra)

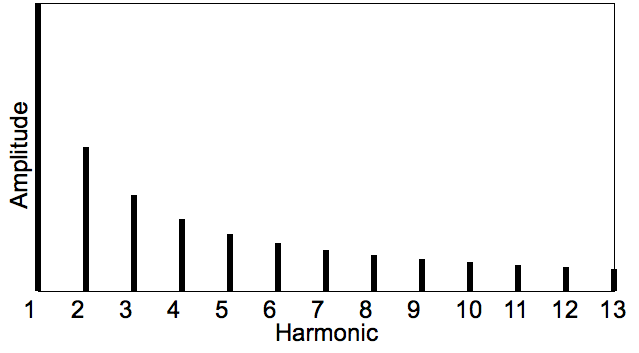
Harmonic spectrum (containing only harmonic overtones)

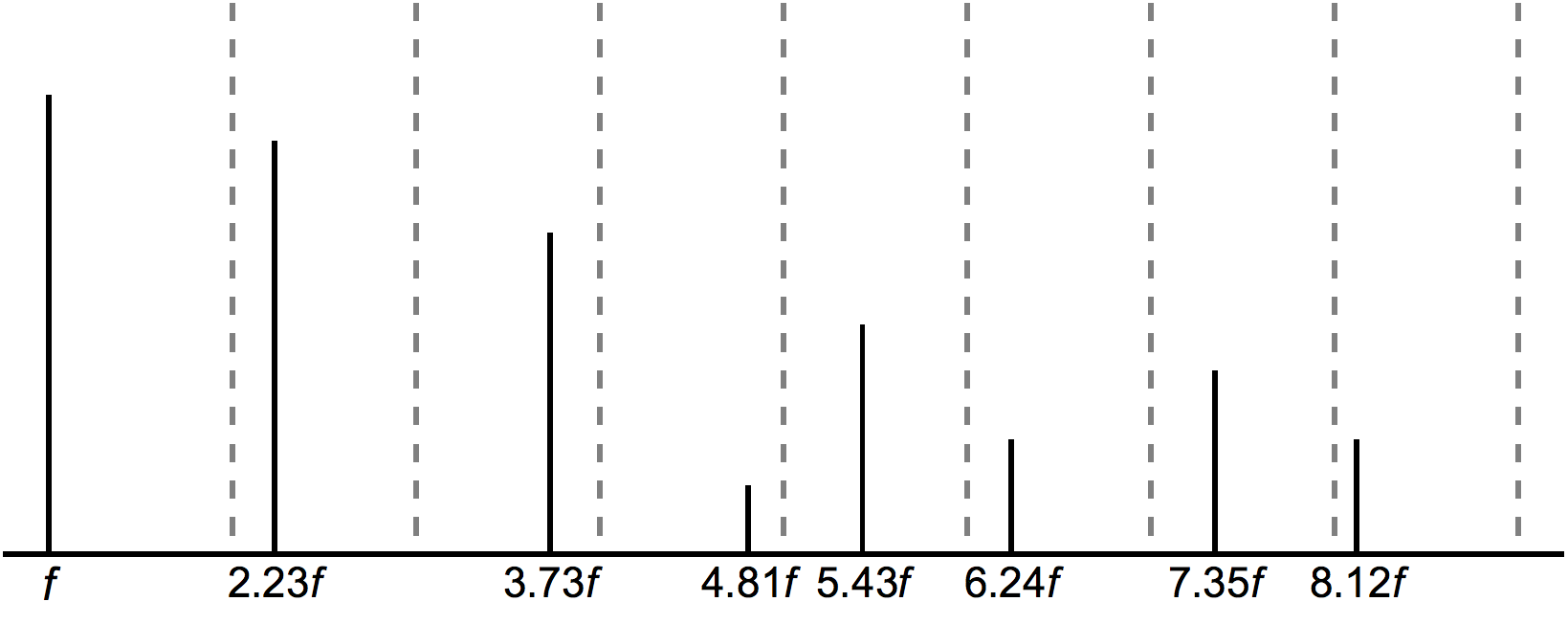
Inharmonic spectrum of a bell (dashed gray lines indicate harmonic overtones)

Spectral music uses the acoustic properties of sound—or sound spectra—as a basis for composition.

== Definition ==
Defined in technical language, spectral music is an acoustic musical practice where compositional decisions are often informed by sonographic representations and mathematical analysis of sound spectra, or by mathematically generated spectra. The spectral approach focuses on manipulating the spectral features, interconnecting them, and transforming them. In this formulation, computer-based sound analysis and representations of audio signals are treated as being analogous to a timbral representation of sound.

The (acoustic-composition) spectral approach originated in France in the early 1970s, and techniques were developed, and later refined, primarily at IRCAM, Paris, with the Ensemble l'Itinéraire, by composers such as Gérard Grisey and Tristan Murail. Hugues Dufourt is commonly credited for introducing the term musique spectrale (spectral music) in an article published in 1979. Murail has described spectral music as an aesthetic rather than a style, not so much a set of techniques as an attitude; as Joshua Fineberg puts it, a recognition that "music is ultimately sound evolving in time". Julian Anderson indicates that a number of major composers associated with spectralism consider the term inappropriate, misleading, and reductive. The Istanbul Spectral Music Conference of 2003 suggested a redefinition of the term "spectral music" to encompass any music that foregrounds timbre as an important element of structure or language.

== Origins and history ==
While spectralism as a historical movement is generally considered to have begun in France and Germany in the 1970s, precursors to the philosophy and techniques of spectralism, as prizing the nature and properties of sound above all else as an organizing principle for music, go back at least to the early twentieth century. Proto-spectral composers include Claude Debussy, Edgard Varèse, Giacinto Scelsi, Olivier Messiaen, György Ligeti, Iannis Xenakis, La Monte Young, and Karlheinz Stockhausen. Other composers who anticipated spectralist ideas in their theoretical writings include Harry Partch, Henry Cowell, and Paul Hindemith. Also crucial to the origins of spectralism was the development of techniques of sound analysis and synthesis in computer music and acoustics during this period, especially focused around IRCAM in France and Darmstadt in Germany.

Julian Anderson considers Danish composer Per Nørgård's Voyage into the Golden Screen for chamber orchestra (1968) to be the first "properly instrumental piece of spectral composition". Spectralism as a recognizable and unified movement, however, arose during the early 1970s, in part as a reaction against and alternative to the primarily pitch focused aesthetics of the serialism and post-serialism which was ascendant at the time. (Note: "... the question of timbre, though it is rigorously tackled by Schönberg (in his theory of the "melody of timbres") and above all by Webern, nevertheless has pre-serial origins, especially in Debussy—in this regard a "founding father" of the same rank as Schönberg. ... Later, it also provided the grounds for the break with Boulez's "structural" orientations and the contestation of the legacy of serialism which was carried out by the French group L'Itinéraire (Gérard Grisey, Michaël Lévinas, Tristan Murail ...)" (Badiou 2009, 82).) Early spectral composers were centered in the cities of Paris and Cologne and associated with the composers of the Ensemble l'Itinéraire and the Feedback group, respectively. In Paris, Gérard Grisey and Tristan Murail were the most prominent pioneers of spectral techniques; Grisey's Espaces Acoustiques and Murail's Gondwana were two influential works of this period. Their early work emphasized the use of the overtone series, techniques of spectral analysis and ring and frequency modulation, and slowly unfolding processes to create music which gave a new attention to timbre and texture.

The German Feedback group, including Johannes Fritsch, Mesías Maiguashca, Péter Eötvös, Claude Vivier, and Clarence Barlow, was primarily associated with students and disciples of Karlheinz Stockhausen, and began to pioneer spectral techniques around the same time. Their work generally placed more emphasis on linear and melodic writing within a spectral context as compared to that of their French contemporaries, though with significant variations. Another important group of early spectral composers was centered in Romania, where a unique form of spectralism arose, in part inspired by Romanian folk music. This folk tradition, as collected by Béla Bartók (1904–1918), with its acoustic scales derived directly from resonance and natural wind instruments of the alphorn family, such as the buciume and tulnice, as well as the cimpoi bagpipe, inspired several spectral composers, including Anatol Vieru, Aurel Stroe, Ștefan Niculescu, Horațiu Rădulescu, Iancu Dumitrescu, Costin Miereanu, and Octavian Nemescu. Cezar|Corneliu Cezar is considered the initiator of Romanian spectralism.

Towards the end of the twentieth century, techniques associated with spectralist composers began to be adopted more widely and the original pioneers of spectralism began to integrate their techniques more fully with those of other traditions. For example, in their works from the later 1980s and into the 1990s, both Grisey and Murail began to shift their emphasis away from the more gradual and regular process which characterized their early work to include more sudden dramatic contrasts as more well linear and contrapuntal writing. Likewise, spectral techniques were adopted by composers from a wider variety of traditions and countries, including the UK (with composers like Julian Anderson and Jonathan Harvey), Finland (composers like Magnus Lindberg and Kaija Saariaho), and the United States. A further development is the emergence of "hyper-spectralism" in the works of Iancu Dumitrescu and Ana-Maria Avram.

== Compositional technique ==
The spectral adventure has allowed the renovation, without imitation of the foundations of occidental music, because it is not a closed technique but an attitude.
—Gérard Grisey

The "panoply of methods and techniques" used are secondary, being only "the means of achieving a sonic end".

Spectral music focuses on the phenomenon and acoustics of sound as well as its potential semantic qualities. Pitch material and intervallic content are often derived from the harmonic series, including the use of microtones. Spectrographic analysis of acoustic sources is used as inspiration for orchestration. The reconstruction of electroacoustic source materials by using acoustic instruments is another common approach to spectral orchestration. In "additive instrumental synthesis", instruments are assigned to play discrete components of a sound, such as an individual partial. Amplitude modulation, frequency modulation, difference tones, harmonic fusion, residue pitch, Shepard-tone phenomena, and other psychoacoustic concepts are applied to music materials.

Formal concepts important in spectral music include process and the stretching of time. Though development is "significantly different from those of minimalist music" in that all musical parameters may be affected, it similarly draws attention to very subtle aspects of the music. These processes most often achieve a smooth transition through interpolation. Any or all of these techniques may be operating in a particular work, though this list is not exhaustive.

The Romanian spectral tradition focuses more on the study of how sound itself behaves in a "live" environment. Sound work is not restricted to harmonic spectra but includes transitory aspects of timbre and non-harmonic musical components (e.g., rhythm, tempo, dynamics). Furthermore, sound is treated phenomenologically as a dynamic presence to be encountered in listening (rather than as an object of scientific study). This approach results in a transformational musical language in which continuous change of the material displaces the central role accorded to structure in spectralism of the "French school".

== Composers ==
=== France ===
Spectral music was initially associated with composers of the French Ensemble l'Itinéraire, including Hugues Dufourt, Gérard Grisey, Tristan Murail, and Michaël Lévinas. For these composers, musical sound (or natural sound) is taken as a model for composition, leading to an interest in the exploration of the interior of sounds. Giacinto Scelsi was an important influence on Grisey, Murail, and Lévinas; his approach with exploring a single sound in his works and a "smooth" conception of time (such as in his Quattro pezzi su una nota sola) greatly influenced these composers to include new instrumental techniques and variations of timbre in their works.

=== Germany and Romania ===
Other spectral music composers include those from the German Feedback group, principally Johannes Fritsch, Mesías Maiguashca, Péter Eötvös, Claude Vivier, and Clarence Barlow. Features of spectralism are also seen independently in the contemporary work of Romanian composers Ștefan Niculescu, Horațiu Rădulescu, and Iancu Dumitrescu. Corneliu Cezar is considered the initiator of Romanian spectralism.

=== United States ===
Independent of spectral music developments in Europe, American composer James Tenney's output included more than fifty significant works that feature spectralist traits. His influences came from encounters with a scientific culture which pervaded during the postwar era, and a "quasi-empiricist musical aesthetic" from John Cage. His works, although having similarities with European spectral music, are distinctive in some ways, for example in his interest in "post-Cageian indeterminacy".

=== Post-spectralism ===
The spectralist movement inspired more recent composers such as Julian Anderson, Ana-Maria Avram, Joshua Fineberg, Georg Friedrich Haas, Jonathan Harvey, Fabien Lévy, Magnus Lindberg, and Kaija Saariaho.

Some of the "post-spectralist" French composers include Éric Tanguy, Philippe Hurel, François Paris, Philippe Leroux, and Thierry Blondeau.

In the United States, composers such as Alvin Lucier, La Monte Young, Terry Riley, Maryanne Amacher, Phill Niblock, and Glenn Branca relate some of the influences of spectral music into their own work. Tenney's work has also influenced a number of composers such as Larry Polansky and John Luther Adams.

In the US, jazz saxophonist and composer Steve Lehman, and in Europe, French composer Frédéric Maurin, have both introduced spectral techniques into the domain of jazz.

== Notable works ==
Characteristic spectral pieces include:

- Gérard Grisey: Les espaces acoustiques (Périodes and Partiels) (1975)
- Hugues Dufourt: Saturne (1978–79)
- Tristan Murail: Gondwana (1980)
- Claude Vivier: Lonely Child (1980)

Other pieces that utilise spectral ideas or techniques include:

- Per Nørgård: Voyage into the Golden Screen (1968)
- Karlheinz Stockhausen: Stimmung (1968)
- James Tenney: Clang and Quintext (1972)
- Michaël Lévinas: Appels (1974)
- Tristan Murail: Mémoire/Erosion (1976)
- Gérard Grisey: Vortex Temporum (1994–1996)

Post-spectral pieces include:

- John Chowning: Stria (1977)
- Jonathan Harvey: Mortuos Plango, Vivos Voco (1980)
- Georg Friedrich Haas: in vain (2000)

Stria and Mortuos Plango, Vivos Voco are examples of electronic music that embrace spectral techniques.

== See also ==
- IRCAM (Institute for Research and Coordination in Acoustics/Music, Paris)

== Notes and references ==
=== Sources ===
- Anderson, Julian. 2000. "A Provisional History of Spectral Music". Contemporary Music Review 19, no. 2 ("Spectral Music: History and Techniques"): 7–22.
- Anderson, Julian. 2001. "Spectral Music". The New Grove Dictionary of Music and Musicians, second edition, edited by Stanley Sadie and John Tyrrell. London: Macmillan.
- Anon. 2009. "Doctoral Student Continues Legacy of Professor's Spectral Music". Research: Breakthroughs in Knowledge and Ideas at Columbia website (Accessed 7 May 2012).
- Badiou, Alain. 2009. Logics of Worlds: The Sequel to Being and Event, translated by Alberto Toscano. London, New York: Continuum. ISBN 978-0-8264-9470-2.
- Court, Jean-Michel, and Ludovic Florin (eds.). 2015. Rencontres du jazz et de la musique contemporaine. Toulouse: Presses Universitaires du Midi. ISBN 978-2-8107-0374-6.
- Fineberg, Joshua (ed.). 2000a. Spectral Music: History and Techniques. Amsterdam: Overseas Publishers Association, published by license under the Harwood Academic Publishers imprint, ©2000. ISBN 90-5755-131-4. Constituting Contemporary Music Review 19, no. 2.
- Grisey, Gérard and Fineberg, Joshua. 2000. "Did you say Spectral?". Contemporary Music Review 19, no. 3:1–3. doi:10.1080/07494460000640311
- Halbreich, Harry. 1992. Roumanie, terre du neuvième ciel. Bucharest: Axis Mundi.
- Joos, Maxime. 2002. "'La cloche et la vague': Introduction à la musique spectrale—Tristan Murail et Jonathan Harvey". Musica falsa: Musique, art, philosophie, no. 16 (Fall): 30–31.
- McClellan, James. n.d. "James McClellan – Professor".
- Moscovich, Viviana. 1997. "French Spectral Music: An Introduction". Tempo new series, no. 200 (April): 21–27.
- Murail, Tristan (2005-04-01). "Scelsi and L'Itinéraire: The Exploration of Sound". Contemporary Music Review 24, nos. 2–3: 181–185. doi:10.1080/07494460500154830 ISSN 0749-4467
- O'Callaghan, James. 2018. "Spectral Music and the Appeal to Nature". Twentieth-Century Music 15, no. 1: 57–73. doi:10.1017/S1478572218000063
- Pugin, Tristan. 2001. "Through the Spectrum: The New Intimacy in French Music (II)". Tempo (217): 38–47.
- Reigle, Robert. 2008. "Spectral Musics Old and New". In Spectral World Musics: Proceedings of the Istanbul Spectral Music Conference, edited by Robert Reigle and Paul Whitehead. Istanbul: Pan Yayincilik. ISBN 9944-396-27-3.
- Rose, François. 1996. "Introduction to the Pitch Organization of French Spectral Music". Perspectives of New Music 34, no. 2 (Summer): 6–39.
- Sykes, Claire. 2003. "Spiritual Spectralism: The Music of Jonathan Harvey". Musicworks: Explorations in Sound, no. 87 (Fall): 30–37.
- Teodorescu-Ciocanea, Livia. 2004. Timbrul Muzical, Strategii de compoziţie. Bucharest: Editura Muzicală. ISBN 973-42-0344-4.
- Wannamaker, Robert A. 2008. "The Spectral Music of James Tenney". Contemporary Music Review 27, no. 1:91–130. doi:10.1080/07494460701671558
