= Grup Instrumental de València =

- Orchestra
- official logo
- Founded: 1991
- Location: Valencia, Spain
- Principal conductor: Joan Cerveró
- Website: www.grupinstrumental.com

The Grup Instrumental de València (unofficial English title: Valencia Instrumental Group) is a Spanish contemporary music ensemble created in 1991. Subsidized by the Ministry of Culture and sponsored by the Generalitat Valenciana through the Valencian Music Institute (IVM), it is the permanent resident ensemble of the Ensems Festival and a regular in the Alicante Festival.

In 2005 it was awarded the Music National Prize for its work in investigating and recovering the 20th century's musical repertory, through its participation in the concerts offered in the Cervantes Institutes' cycle "The exile of the Spanish culture″.

== Players ==
Conductor: Joan Cerveró

Violin: Mª Carmen Antequera, Vicente Taroncher
Viola: Miguel Ángel Balaguer, Paco Llopis
Cello: David Apellániz, Mayte García
Double Bass: Javier Sapiña

Flute: José Mª Sáez Ferriz
Clarinet: Pepe Cerveró
Oboe: Vicent Llimerà
Bassoon: Juan Sapiña

Horn: Juan José Llimerà
Trumpet: Vicent Campos
Trombone: Salvador Tarrasó
Tuba: Eduardo Nogueroles

Percussion: Manuel Gasent, Lluís Marzal
Harp: Luisa Domingo

Piano: Carlos Apellániz
