= Vannina Santoni =

French operatic soprano (born 1987)

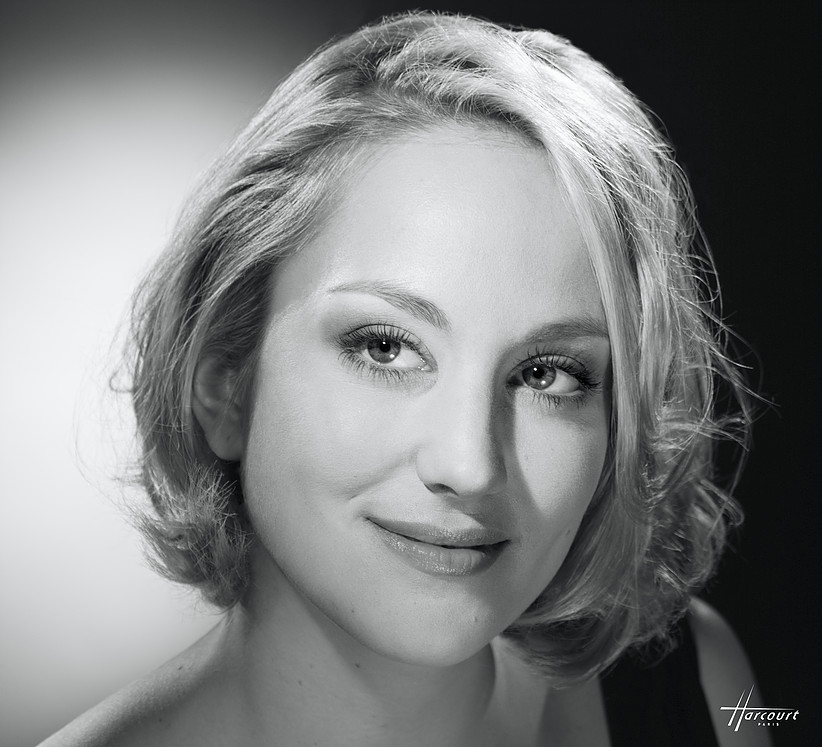
- Santoni in 2014
- Born: 1987 (age 38–39)
- Education: Conservatoire de Paris
- Occupation: Operatic soprano
- Website: vanninasantoni.com

Vannina Santoni (born 1987) is a French lyric soprano, who has appeared in France and abroad.

== Life and career ==
Santoni was born in Volpajola, Corsica, in 1987. Her first singing experience was in the children's choir of the Maîtrise de Radio France where she sang with conductors such as James Levine and Georges Prêtre. She studied violin and piano at the Conservatoire Georges Bizet in Paris and took dancing lessons. She studied voice at the Conservatoire de Paris, in classes of Jean-Paul Fouchécourt and Ruggero Raimondi, graduating in 2010.

Santoni began her career performing as Donna Anna in Mozart's Don Giovanni in Italy and at the Royal Opera of Versailles. Santoni performed in the world premiere of Philippe Hurel's Pigeons d'argile in 2014, as Patricia Baer at the Capitole de Toulouse. She performed as the Countess in Mozart's Le nozze di Figaro at the Festival Musiques au cœur d'Antibes d'Ève Ruggieri. In 2017 she appeared as Micaëla in Bizet's Carmen at the Théâtre des Champs-Élysées and as Frasquita in the same opera at the Opéra Bastille. In 2017 she first appeared in the title role of Massenet's Manon at the Opéra de Monte-Carlo She performed as Juliette at the Opéra de Nice and as la Princesse Saamcheddine in Henri Rabaud's Mârouf, savetier du Caire at both the Opéra de Bordeaux and the Opéra-Comique where she also appeared as Agnès in Gounod's La nonne sanglante. At the Paris Opera, she performed as Pamina in Mozart's Die Zauberflöte in 2019, as Dona Musique/La Bouchère in the world premiere of Marc-André Dalbavie's The Satin Slipper in 2021; and as Fiordiligi in Mozart's Così fan tutte in 2024. In 2024 she performed as Blanche in Poulenc's Dialogues des Carmélites at the Théâtre des Champs-Élysées. In 2025 she was cast as Marguerite in the Opéra de Lille production of Gounod's Faust.

Santoni has appeared in France also at the Cité de la Musique, Capitole de Toulouse, Tours Opera, Opéra de Nancy, and in Europe at the Konzerthaus in Vienna, Manoel Theatre of Malta, the Cologne Opera and Hong Kong Cultural Centre.

Her roles also include especially Gretel in Humperdinck's Hänsel und Gretel, Leïla in Bizet's Les pêcheurs de perles, Juliette in Gounod's Roméo et Juliette, Adina in Donizetti's L'elisir d'amore, Adele in Die Fledermaus by Johann Strauss, and Suor Angelica and Lauretta in Puccini's Il trittico.

In concert, Santoni has performed Ein deutsches Requiem by Brahms, Verdi's Requiem, Mozart's Vesperae solennes de confessore and the Great Mass in C minor, Schubert's Mass in G major and Émile Paladilhe's oratorio Les Saintes Maries de la Mer.

=== Personal life ===
Santoni has a Corsican father and a Russian mother. She is married to a conductor; and they have two children.

== Discography ==
- Johann Christian Bach: Zanaïda. CD from the Théâtre de Saint Quentin-en-Yvelines (2014).
- Philippe Hurel: Les Pigeons d'argile, DVD of the 2014 world premiere at the Théâtre du Capitole de Toulouse (2014). conducted by Tito Ceccherini, directed by Mariame Clément.
- Debussy: Pelléas et Mélisande (2021), with Chorus of Opéra de Lille, Les Siècles, cond. François-Xavier Roth.
- Par Amour, music from operas, with Orchestre national de Lille, cond.: Jean-Marie Zeitouni (2025).
