= Roger Tessier =

French composer (born 1939)

Roger Tessier (born 14 January 1939 in Nantes) is a French composer. With Gérard Grisey, Tristan Murail and Michaël Lévinas, he is one of the founding members of the Parisian Ensemble l'Itinéraire. From 1962 to 1965, Tessier studied musical composition at the Conservatoire de Paris.

== Selected works ==
- 1962: Automne, choir for 4 mixed voices
- 1971: Mouvements II, for piano
- 1975: Danses pour Annaig, for oboe, harp and string orchestra
- 1976: Ojma, for string trio, commissioned by Radio France
- 1979: Clair-Obscur, for soprano, flute, horn, cello and electroacoustics
- 1987: Coalescene, for clarinet and 2 orchestras
- 1988: Scène III, for cello and tape
- 1992: Scène IV, for 2 horns after texts by Emil Cioran
- 1992: L'ombre de Narcisse, for 11 instruments
- 1994: Electric Dream Fantasy for trio Ondes Martenot
- 1998: Envol. A la mémoire de Nicolas de Stael, for Octet

== Bibliography ==
- Jean-Noel von der Weid: Die Musik des 20. Jahrhunderts. Frankfurt am Main & Leipzig 2001, p. 541. ISBN 345817068-5
