= Gérard Grisey =

French composer (1946–1998)

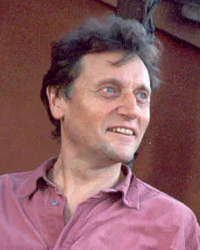
Gérard Grisey

Gérard Henri Grisey (/ˈɡrɪzi/; French: [ɡʁizɛ]; 17 June 1946 – 11 November 1998) was a twentieth-century French composer of contemporary classical music. His work is often associated with spectral music, of which he was a major pioneer.

== Biography ==
Grisey was born in Belfort, France, on 17 June 1946. From a very young age, Grisey demonstrated enormous interest and talent in music composition and study, writing his first essay on music when he was 9 years old. His first instrument was the accordion, which he received as a Christmas present aged 5. He was very proficient on the instrument, twice winning first prize at the French national championship and competing in the accordion World Cup. He studied at the conservatory in Trossingen, West Germany, from 1963 to 1965. There he took classes in accordion, as well as harmony, fugue, and counterpoint, before going on to the Conservatoire de Paris, where he studied with Olivier Messiaen from 1965 to 1967 and again from 1968 to 1972, while also working with Henri Dutilleux at the École normale de musique in 1968. He won prizes for piano accompaniment, harmony, counterpoint, fugue, and composition at the Conservatoire under Messiaen's guidance. He also studied electroacoustics with Jean-Étienne Marie in 1969, composition with Karlheinz Stockhausen, Iannis Xenakis and György Ligeti at the Darmstädter Ferienkurse in 1972, and acoustics with Émile Leipp at the Faculté des Sciences in 1974. Other studies were undertaken in the summer of 1969 at the Accademia Chigiana in Siena, Italy.

Grisey won the Prix de Rome, enabling him to stay at the Villa Medici in Rome from 1972 to 1974. While there he became friends with Tristan Murail, with whom he founded the group L'Itinéraire in 1973 along with Roger Tessier and Michaël Lévinas, later to be joined by Hugues Dufourt. In 1974–75, he studied acoustics with Émile Leipp at the Paris VI University, and in 1980 became a trainee at IRCAM in the computer music course organized by David Wessel and Marc Battier. During the same year, Grisey went to Berlin as a guest of the D.A.A.D. (Berliner Künstlerprogramm des DAAD) program. He subsequently left for the University of California, Berkeley, where he was appointed professor of theory and composition for the years 1982 to 1985 or until 1986. After returning to Europe, he took up the role of professor of orchestration and composition at the Conservatoire de Paris from 1987 until his death, while also holding numerous composition seminars in France (Centre Acanthes, Lyon, Paris) and abroad (Darmstadt, Freiburg, Milan, Reggio Emilia, Oslo, Helsinki, Malmö, Göteborg, Los Angeles, Stanford, London, Moscow, Madrid, etc.) For notable pupils See: List of music students by teacher: G to J#Gérard Grisey.

Grisey died at the age of 52 in Paris on 11 November 1998 due to a ruptured aneurysm.

== Musical style ==
Grisey's music is often considered to belong to the genre of spectral music, which he is credited with founding along with fellow composer Tristan Murail, although he later disowned the label in interviews and writings. According to British journalist Tom Service, "His achievement has often been reduced to yet another of new music's fetishistic labels, 'spectralism' – a category that Grisey had rejected by the end of his life."

Nonetheless, he spent much of his career exploring the spectrum of tone colour between harmonic overtones and noise. In addition, he was fascinated by musical processes which unfold slowly, and he made musical time a major element of many of his pieces. He expressed the opinion that: "We are musicians and our model is sound not literature, sound not mathematics, sound not theatre, visual arts, quantum physics, geology, astrology or acupuncture."

== Works (chronological) ==
- Passacaglia Pour Madame Darrow, for accordion (1966)
- Échanges, for prepared piano and double bass (1968)
- Mégalithes, for 15 brass players (1969)
- Charme, for clarinet solo (1969)
- Perichoresis, for 3 instrumental groups (1969–1970)
- Initiation, for baritone, trombone, and double bass (1970)
- Vagues, chemins, le souffle, for clarinet and orchestra (1970–72)
- D'eau et de pierre, for 2 instrumental groups (1972)
- Dérives, for 2 orchestral groups (1973–74)
- Les espaces acoustiques – II – Périodes, for flute, clarinet, trombone, violin, viola, cello, and double bass (1974)
- Les espaces acoustiques – III – Partiels, for 18 musicians (1975)
- Manifestations, for youth orchestra (1976)
- Les espaces acoustiques – I – Prologue, for viola and optional live electronics (1976)
- Les espaces acoustiques – IV – Modulations, for orchestra (1976–77)
- Sortie vers la lumière du jour, for electric organ and 14 musicians (1978)
- Jour, contre-jour, for electric organ, 14 musicians, and tape (1978–79)
- Tempus ex machina, for 6 percussionists (1979)
- Les espaces acoustiques – V – Transitoires, for large orchestra (1980)
- Solo pour deux, for clarinet and trombone (1981)
- Anubis-Nout, for B♭ contrabass clarinet (1983) recorded by Ernesto Molinari, Fie Schouten, Carl Rosman
- Les chants de l'amour, for 12 voices and tape (1982–1984)
- Les espaces acoustiques – VI – Epilogue, for 4 solo horns and large orchestra (1985)
- Talea, for violin, cello, flute, clarinet, and piano (1986)
- Le temps et l'écume, for 4 percussionists, 2 synthesizers, and chamber orchestra (1988–89)
- Accords perdus: Cinq miniatures, for 2 horns (1989)
- Le noir de l'étoile, for 6 percussionists, tape, and live electronics (1989–90)
- Anubis et Nout, for bass saxophone or baritone saxophone (1990)
- L'icône paradoxale (Hommage à Piero della Francesca), for 2 female voices and 2 orchestral groups (1992–94)
- Stèle, for 2 percussionists (1995)
- Vortex temporum, for piano, clarinet (bass, Bb and A), flute (bass, C and picc.), violin, viola and cello (1994–96)
- Quatre chants pour franchir le seuil, for soprano and fifteen instruments (1997–98)
