= In vain (Haas) =

Composition by Georg Friedrich Haas

in vain
- by Georg Friedrich Haas
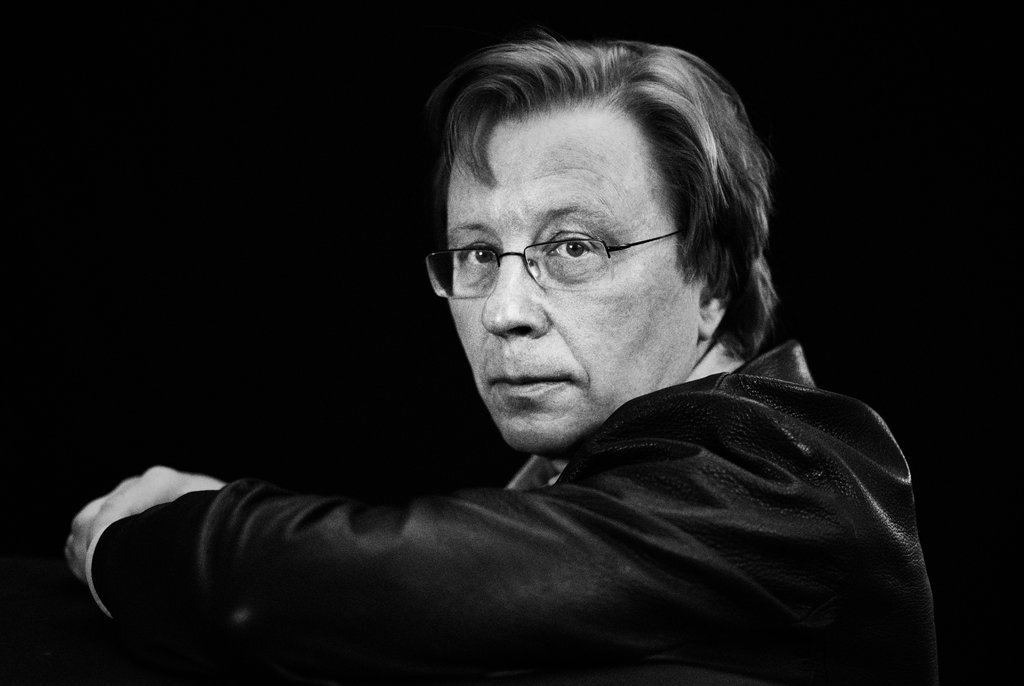
- Georg Friedrich Haas in 2014
- Period: Contemporary
- Composed: 2000
- Duration: c. 70 minutes
- Scoring: Orchestra

Premiere
- Date: October 29, 2000
- Location: Funkhaus Wallrafplatz, Cologne
- Conductor: Sylvain Cambreling
- Performers: Klangforum Wien

in vain is a 2000 composition for 24 instruments by Austrian composer Georg Friedrich Haas. It was premiered on October 29, 2000, by Sylvain Cambreling and the Klangforum Wien and lasts approximately 70 minutes. The piece is one of Haas' best-known works.

== Background and composition ==
in vain was commissioned by the Westdeutscher Rundfunk for Sylvain Cambreling (to whom the work is dedicated) and Klangforum Wien. Haas wrote the piece in response to the rise of the far-right in Austria.

The piece deals extensively with microtonality. The light levels in the hall are specified in the score; some sections of the piece are played in very bright light, and about twenty minutes are played in complete darkness.

=== Instrumentation ===
The piece is scored for the following ensemble:

Woodwinds

2 Flutes (1st doubling piccolo, 2nd doubling piccolo and bass flute)
Oboe
2 Clarinets in B♭ (2nd doubling bass clarinet)
Soprano saxophone (doubling tenor saxophone)
Bassoon

Brass

2 Horns in F
2 Trombones

Keyboards

Accordion
Piano

Percussion

Percussion 1:

Marimba
Crotales
Glockenspiel
Plate bell (E)
Cymbal
Tam-tam

Percussion 2:

Crotales
Glockenspiel
Vibraphone
Plate bell (B♭)
Chinese cymbal
Tam-tam

Strings

Harp

3 Violins
2 Violas
2 Cellos
Double bass (five string)

== Reception ==
Simon Rattle has hailed in vain as "one of the first masterpieces of the 21st century", and the Austrian newspaper Die Presse has called it a "classic". The piece was named the greatest work of art music since 2000 in a Classic Voice poll.

In his 2007 book The Rest Is Noise, Alex Ross wrote that the piece "may mark a new departure in Austro-German music, joining spectral harmony to a vast Brucknerian structure".
