= La nonne sanglante =

Opera by Charles Gounod

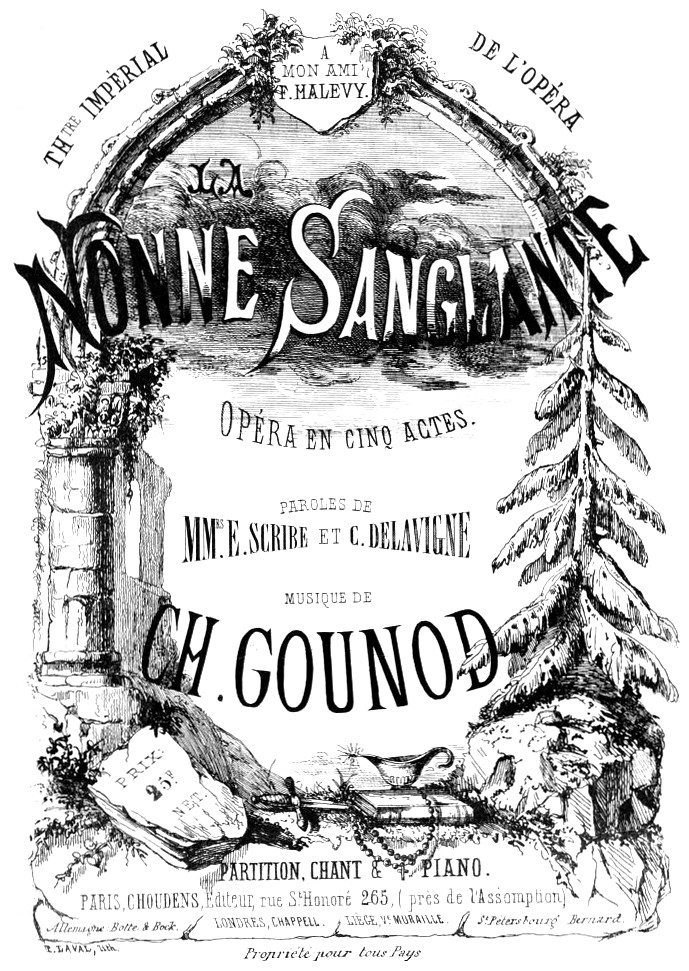
La nonne sanglante - title page of the piano score - Paris 1855

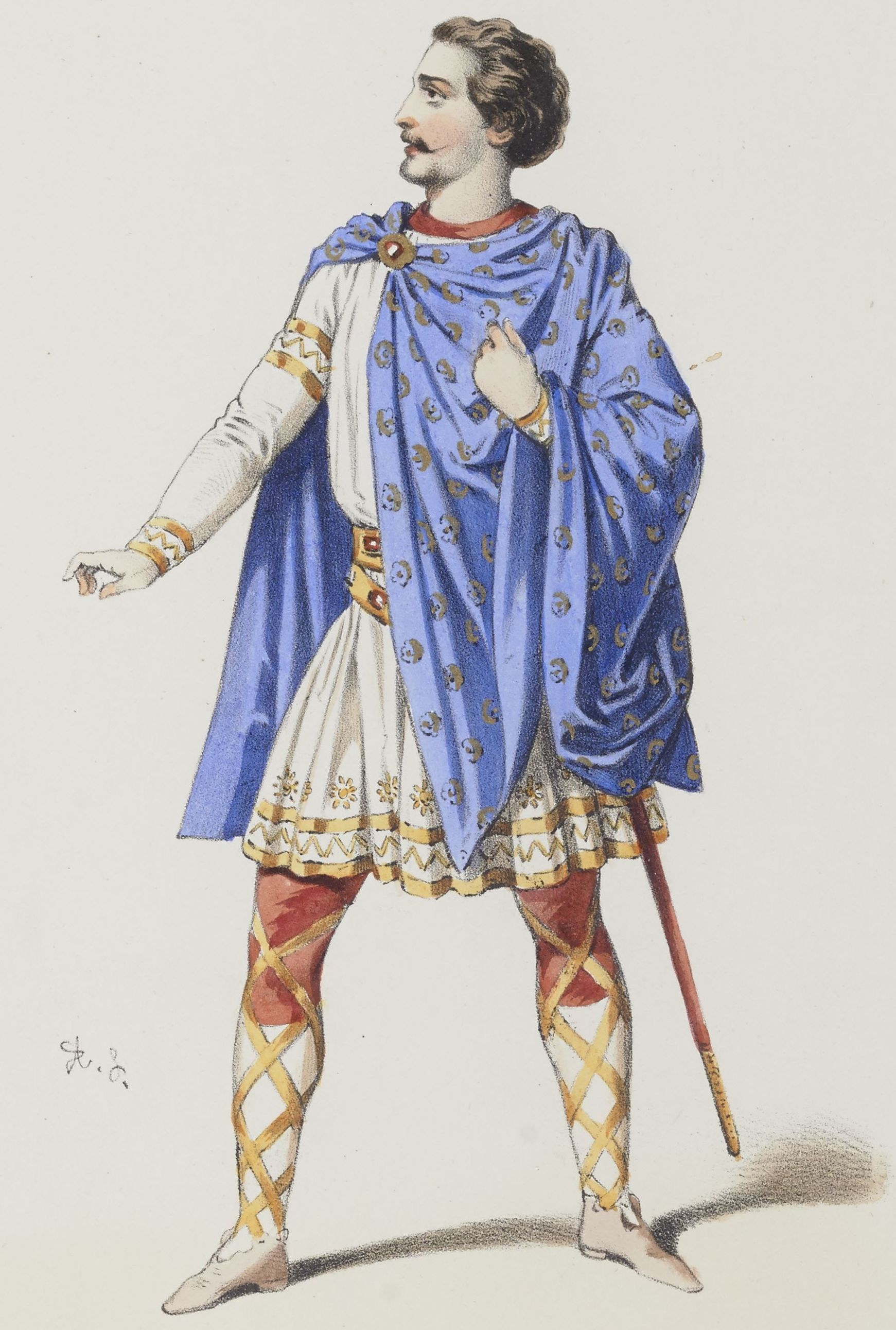
Louis Gueymard as Rodolphe, La nonne sanglante. Sketch (1854) by Alexandre Lacauchie

La nonne sanglante (The Bloody Nun) is a five-act opera by Charles Gounod to a libretto by Eugène Scribe and Germain Delavigne, after an episode in The Monk, a 1796 gothic novel by Matthew Gregory Lewis. (Note: The libretto was originally considered by "eight other composers, including Giuseppe Verdi and Hector Berlioz", who wrote a few fragments before abandoning it.) The opera was written between 1852 and 1854 and was first produced on 18 October 1854 at the Salle Le Peletier by the Paris Opera.

It received 11 performances between October and November 1854. Its poor reception, in the midst of various crises, contributed to the overthrow of the Opéra director Nestor Roqueplan, who was replaced by his adversary François-Louis Crosnier. Crosnier immediately cancelled the run, saying that 'such filth' (pareilles ordures) would no longer be tolerated.

== Performance history ==
Although the first run sold well, Gounod's opera disappeared completely for a very long time. After the unfortunate beginning, no other opera manager took the risk. (Note: One year later, British composer Edward Loder presented his version of the same subject, Raymond and Agnes. This opera was first shown in Manchester and was brought to London in 1859. Loder's version was not very successful either. It was revived only once, 1966 in Cambridge.)

On 18-20 March 2008, Theater Osnabrück presented La nonne sanglante for the first time on a German stage, with Yoonki Baek (Rodolphe), Eva Schneidereit (La nonne sanglante), Natalia Atmanchuk (Agnes). The conductor was Hermann Bäumer

On 2 June 2018 the opera had a rare Paris revival at the Opéra-Comique with Michael Spyres as Rodolphe, Jodie Devos as Arthur, Jean Teitgen as Pierre and Marion Lebègue as the nun, conducted by Laurence Equilbey, and directed by David Bobée.

La nonne sanglante received its UK premiere in 2021 by Gothic Opera, with performances at Hoxton Hall, London.

== Roles ==
Role	Voice type	Premiere Cast, October 18, 1854 (Conductor: Narcisse Girard)
Le comte Ludorf	bass	Jean-Baptiste Merly
Le baron Moldaw	bass	Jacques-Alfred Guignot
Pierre l'hermite	bass	Jean Depassio
Rodolphe, son of Ludorf	tenor	Louis Guéymard
Agnès, daughter of Moldaw	soprano	Anne Poinsot
La nonne sanglante	mezzo-soprano	Palmyre Wertheimber
Arthur, Rodolphe's servant	soprano	Marie-Dussy
Vassals, soldiers, wedding-guests, peasants, knights, ghosts

== Synopsis ==
Place: Bohemia
Time: 11th century

=== Prologue ===
Agnès is in love with Rodolphe, although the two families are perpetually at war with each other. Moldaw's castle is said to be haunted by the bloody figure of a nun.

=== Act 1 ===
Pierre, the hermit, breaks up a row between the family vassals and adjures them to join his crusade. He proposes that Agnès should marry Rodoplhe's brother Théobald to cement relations between the families. The lovers agree that to escape, Agnès should disguise herself as the ghost of the nonne sanglante and elope with him at midnight.

=== Act 2 ===
Arthur sings of the legend of la nonne sanglante. At Rodolphe's rendez-vous, he walks off with the ghost of the nun, believing it to be Agnès. The ghosts of Rodolphe's ancestors materialise in the magically-restored family castle to witness the marriage of Rodolphe and the nun.

=== Act 3 ===
Théobald has been killed in battle, so Rodolphe is in theory free to marry Agnès. However, Rodolphe reveals to Arthur that he is nightly haunted by the nun who reminds him of his vows. She eventually reveals that Rodolphe can only be released by killing the (unidentified) man who murdered her.

=== Act 4 ===
At the marriage feast of Rodophe and Agnès, the nun's ghost appears at midnight and indicates to Rodolphe that his father, Ludorf, was her murderer. Rodolphe abandons the ceremonies in horror, reigniting the ancient mutual hatred of the families.

=== Act 5 ===
Ludorf is consumed by guilt for his crime and will accept punishment if he can meet with Rodolphe for one last time. He overhears Moldaw's retainers planning to kidnap Rodolphe. Rodolphe then appears with Agnès and confesses to her the story of the ghost. To save his son, Ludorf presents himself to Moldaw's men as his son, and is murdered by them, dying in his son's arms at the tomb of the murdered nun. This act of expiation is clearly acceptable to the ghost who ascends to heaven praying for Ludorf.

== Recording ==
- Hermann Bäumer, Conductor, Osnabruck Symphony Orchestra, Chorus of Theater Osnabrück; Yoonki Baek (Rodolphe), Eva Schneidereit (La nonne sanglante), Natalia Atmanchuk (Agnes). CPO777 388-2
- Laurence Equilbey, Conductor, Insula Orchestra, Choeur Accentus, Michael Spyres (Rodolphe), Marion Lebègue (La nonne sanglante), Vannina Santoni (Agnès), Jérôme Boutillier (Le Comte), Jodie Devos (Arthur), Jean Teitgen (Pierre L'Ermite), Luc Bertin-Hugault (Le baron), Enquerrand De Hys (Fritz), stage Director David Bobée. DVD or Blu-ray Naxos 2019.

Cammarano's libretto for Donizetti's opera "Maria de Rudenz" (1838) is based on "La nonne sanglante" and "The Monk" (Ashbrook p.566)
