= Partiels =

1975 spectral music composition

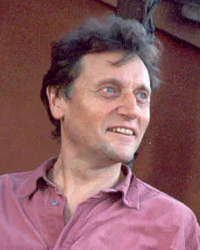
Gérard Grisey

Partiels is a 1975 music composition by French composer Gérard Grisey. Written for 18 instruments, the piece is considered a defining work of spectral music. Many second- and third-generation spectral composers cite Partiels as causing their initial interest in the spectral outlook. It is the third piece in Grisey's cycle, Les Espaces Acoustiques.

The opening of Partiels is derived from an electronic sonogram analysis of the attack of a low E2 on a trombone. This spectrum is orchestrally synthesized through the assignment of different instruments to each harmonic partial in such a way as to harmonically and gesturally model the dynamic temporal evolution of the attack. Thus the opening features the successive entrance of lower partials with the fifth and ninth partials being louder than lower ones, including the fundamental, and all higher partials gradually trailing off in amplitude. Each partial is approximated to the nearest quarter tone. A low bass reinforces the fundamental an octave lower on the open E1 string.

Partiels also makes use of sum and difference tones to create harmonies.

== Instrumentation ==
Partiels is written for the following 18 instruments:

2 flutes (1st doubling piccolo and alto flute; 2nd doubling piccolo)
1 oboe (doubling English horn)
2 clarinets in B♭ (1st doubling clarinet in E♭; 2nd doubling clarinet in A)
1 bass clarinet (doubling contrabass clarinet)

2 horns
1 trombone

1 accordion (or electric organ)

2 percussionists

2 violins
2 violas
1 cello
1 contrabass

In the "Nomenclature" section of the score, Grisey indicates the possibility of performing the piece with only one horn player and one percussionist.
