= Yves Balmer =

French-Swiss composer

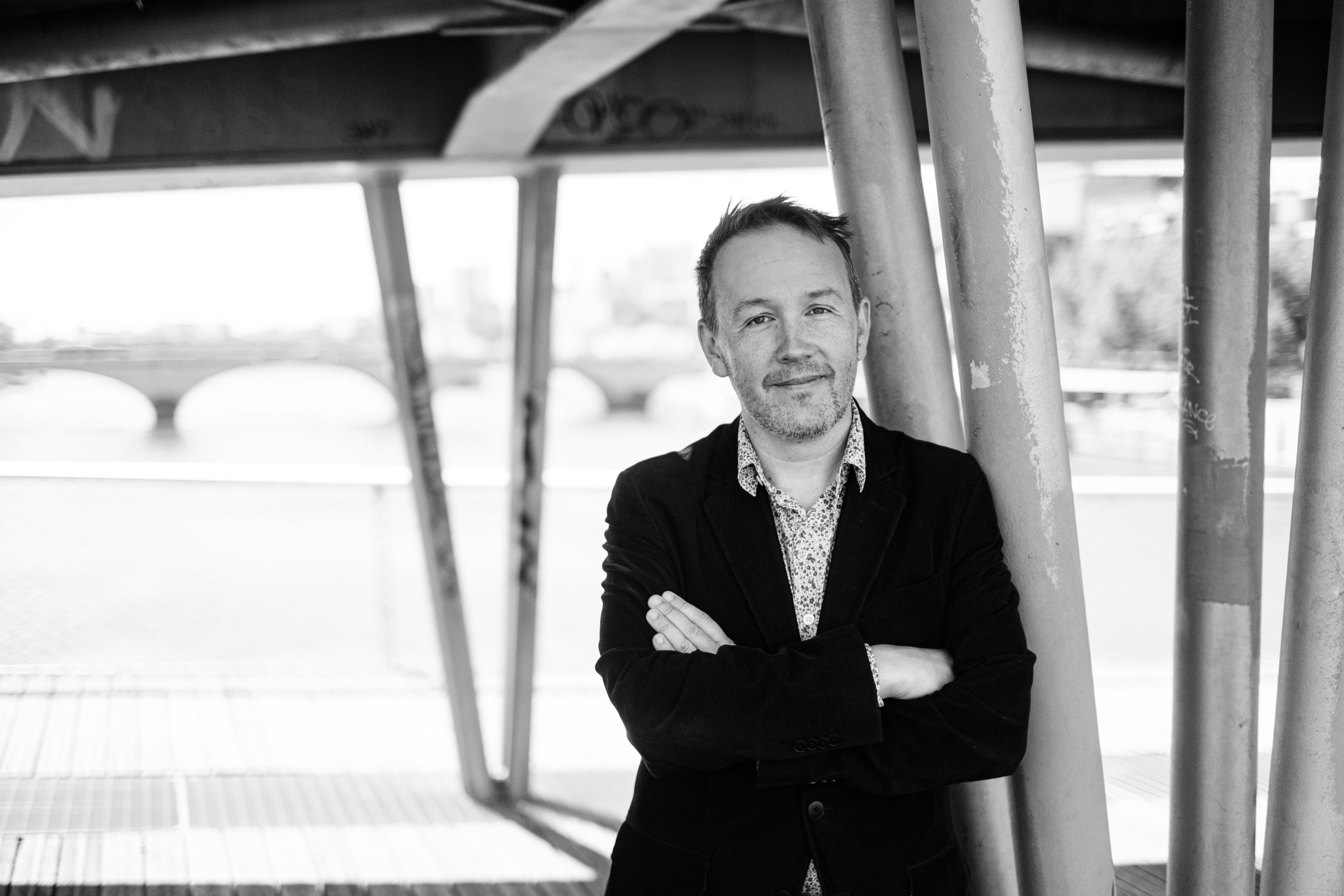
- Born: 6 June 1978 (age 47); Valenciennes, France
- Era: Contemporary

Yves Balmer (born 6 June 1978) is a French and Swiss composer. He is also a professor, musicologist, and specialist in French music of the 20th and 21st centuries. He is a professor of musical analysis at the Conservatoire national supérieur de musique et de danse de Paris.

== Life and work ==
Balmer has a dual background in music and academia. He studied piano from 1996 to 2000 at the Conservatoire de Lille, where he obtained four gold medals in piano, chamber music, musical writing, and music history. From 2000 to 2005, he studied at the Conservatoire national supérieur de musique et de danse de Paris, where he obtained six first prizes and two Diplômes de Formation Supérieure.

Balmer also earned a doctoral degree in musicology in 2008 from the university Charles de Gaulle University – Lille III, under the supervision of Joëlle Caullier. His thesis focused on the music of Olivier Messiaen.

Balmer was admitted to Agrégation in 2003 and was also a researcher at the Bibliothèque nationale de France (Department of Music) from 2004 to 2006.

From 2006 to 2018, he was a lecturer, then reader at the École normale supérieure de Lyon, where he was also the Deputy Director (2010-12) and Director (2012-13) of the Department of Arts. He was a member of the jury of the Agrégation de musique and a member of the Conseil national des universités. Since 2008, he has been a professor of musical analysis at the Conservatoire de Paris, where he was previously an assistant in the class of musical analysis of Michaël Lévinas.

Balmer's research focuses on French music of the 20th century, particularly the genetic processes and diffusion of the work of Olivier Messiaen. In 2017, he published Le modèle et l'invention, Olivier Messiaen et la technique de l'emprunt, which was considered a turning point in research on this composer. The study of links between Claude Debussy's musical language and Messiaen was further developed in the Journal of the American Musicological Society.

Since 2017, Yves Balmer also developed a career as a composer, with his works being published by Gérard Billaudot Éditeur. The Quatuor Voce commissioned a new piece for quatuor and a transcription from Debussy. Both were recorded on the CD Poétiques de l'instant : Debussy, Balmer. (Quatuor Voce, Jodie Devos, Juliette Hurel, Emmanuel Ceysson) at Alpha (label). It received the prestigious Diapason d'Or, and was reviewed in The Guardian, Le Monde, Le Soir, De Standaard. It is broadcast on several public and private radios, such as BBC Radio 3, France Musique, Radio Classique, and Catalunya Ràdio.

In 2023, Yves Balmer was awarded a prize in the Kaija Saariaho Organ Composition Competition in the solo organ works category
