= François Paris =

French composer and professor (born 1961)

François Paris (born 28 October 1961 in Valenciennes) is a French composer and professor.

He is known for his inclusion of microtonal elements in his music.

== Life ==
He studied in the conservatoire of Versailles then in the Conservatoire de Paris with Ivo Malec, Betsy Jolas (analysis) and Gérard Grisey(composition and orchestration). Meanwhile, he studied orchestral direction. François Paris has received the award of the Concours International de Composition de Besançon. In 1993 he was selected and commissioned a work by Ircam. and studied at the French Academy in Rome (1993 to 1995). His music is frequently broadcast in France and internationally. He received many commands from diverse institutions ( Ircam, Itinéraire, Radio-France, Nuova Arca, «La filature» de Mulhouse, State commands, etc.).

== Compositional Techniques ==
François uses different forms of equal temperament in his music. Where 12 tone equal temperament is based on semitones ascending by root 2, Paris uses other root values, such as 1.2, 1.6 and 2.4, in order to stretch and shrink the temperament of the composition.

== Selected works ==
=== Vocal music ===
- Les Champs de l'ombre blanche, 1991
- Les Confessions silencieuses, 1995–1996
- Murs, pour quatre voix et orchestre de chambre

=== Concerto music ===
- L'Empreinte du cygne, double concerto pour violoncelle, piano et orchestre 1997-1998

=== Orchestral music ===
- La Chair de l'aube, pour orchestre 1992

=== Ensemble music ===
- Sur la Nuque de la mer étoilée, pour sept instrumentistes 1993-1994

=== Chamber music ===
- Douze préludes pour quatre pianos imaginaires 1995
- L'octobre seul, pour quintette 1991
- La vague en son écrin, trio de flûtes à bec 1994
- Oxymore, solo pour deux percussionnistes 1994
- Tic-tac parc, musica per il parco Val Grande 1997

=== Soloist music ===
- Lecture d'une vague, «Prélude des Champs de l'ombre blanche», 1992
- Roque, pour violoncelle 1990
- Sombra, pour violon 1999
