= Georg Friedrich Haas =

Austrian composer (born 1953)

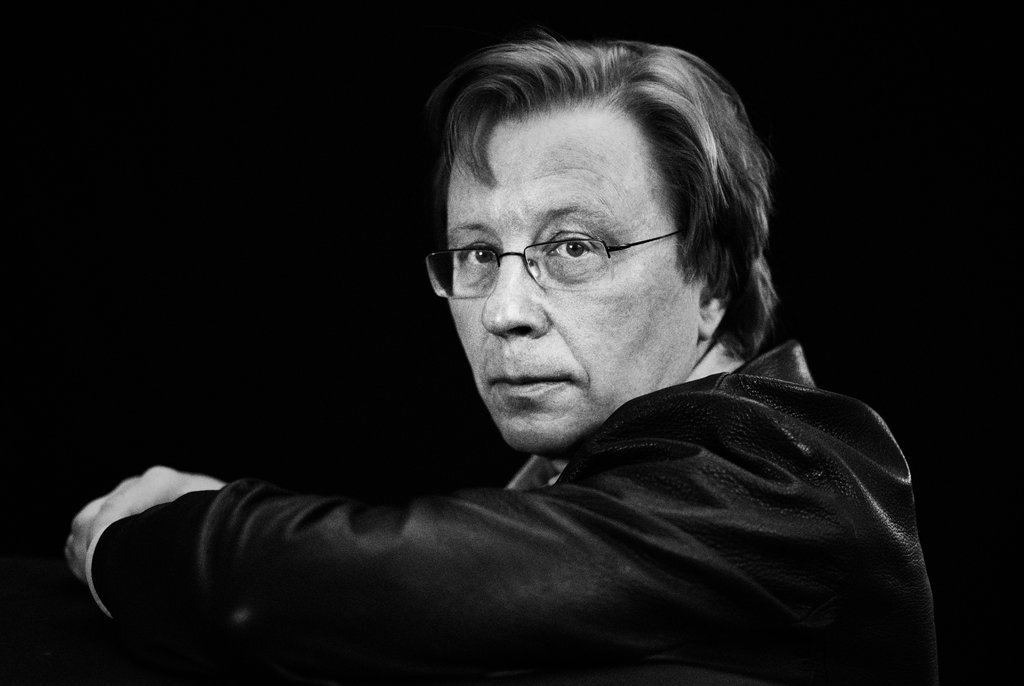
Haas in 2014

Georg Friedrich Haas (born 16 August 1953) is an Austrian composer. In a 2017 Classic Voice poll of the greatest works of art music since 2000, pieces by Haas received the most votes (49), and his composition in vain (2000) topped the list.

== Education and career ==
Georg Friedrich Haas was born in Graz. He grew up in Tschagguns, Vorarlberg, and studied composition with Gösta Neuwirth and Iván Erőd and piano with Doris Wolf at the University of Music and Performing Arts Graz, Austria. Since 1978, he has been teaching at the Hochschule as an instructor, and since 1989 as an associate professor in counterpoint, contemporary composition techniques, analysis, and introduction to microtonal music. Haas is a founding member of the Graz composers' collective Die andere Seite.

Haas completed two years of postgraduate studies at the University of Music and Performing Arts Vienna with Friedrich Cerha, participated in the Darmstädter Ferienkurse (1980, 1988 and 1990), and the computer music course at IRCAM (1991). He received a fellowship from the Salzburg Festival (1992–93), was awarded the Sandoz Prize (1992) and a music grant from the National Ministry of Science, Research, and Culture (1995). His works have been on the programs of the following festivals: Wien Modern (Vienna), Musikprotokoll (Graz), Witten, Huddersfield, Royaumont, Venice Biennale, Festival d'Automne (Paris), as well as at the Darmstädter Ferienkurse and the Salzburg Festival 2011. Since 2005, he has lectured at the Hochschule in Basel, Switzerland; since 2013, he has been a professor of composition at Columbia University, New York.

== Career ==
Haas's style recalls that of György Ligeti in its use of micropolyphony, microintervals and the exploitation of the overtone series; he is often characterized as a leading exponent of spectral music. His aesthetics is guided by the idea that music is able "to articulate a human being's emotions and states of the soul in such a way that other human beings can embrace these emotions and states of the soul as their own" ("Emotionen und seelische Zustände von Menschen so zu formulieren, daß sie auch von anderen Menschen als die ihren angenommen werden können"). Thus Haas has disavowed the intellectualism of some strands of the modernist musical avant-garde (such as serialism and deconstructivism). The emotional atmosphere of many of his works is sombre. Haas's operas have been criticized for evoking themes like suffering, illness and death to aesthetic voyeurism: "the piece [Haas's opera Thomas (2013)] comes dangerously close to a kind of palliative care ward tourism."

In a similar vein, his orchestral works have been compared to film music: "[Dark dreams for symphony orchestra] lets us think of a soundtrack ready-made for a suspense movie" ("lässt aber auch an einen probaten Soundtrack zum Suspense-Streifen denken").

Haas's opera Morgen und Abend, to a libretto by the Norwegian writer Jon Fosse, was jointly commissioned by the Royal Opera House, London, and the Deutsche Oper Berlin. It was premiered on the main stage of the Royal Opera House on 13 November 2015.

== Personal life ==
Haas is the dominant partner in a BDSM kink relationship with his wife, the American writer, BDSM educator, and actor Mollena Williams-Haas. In 2016, The New York Times published an article about his BDSM relationship with his wife. The couple live in Harlem.

== Writings and compositions ==
Haas has published musicological articles on the works of Luigi Nono, Ivan Wyschnegradsky, Alois Hába, Pierre Boulez, and Franz Schubert, among which:

- 'Arc-en-ciel" op.37: Ivan Wyschnegradskys behutsame Annäherung an das Zwölftonintervall', in Horst-Peter Hesse (ed.), Mikrotöne IV. Kongressbericht über das 4. internationale Symposium "Mikrotonforschung, Musik mit Mikrotönen, ekmelische Musik", Salzburg, 2.–5. Mai 1991 (Munich: Nymphenburg, 1993) (Grundfragen der mikrotonalen Musik 2), pp. 79–82
- 'Die Verwirklichung einer Utopie: Ultrachromatik und nicht-oktavierende Tonräume in Ivan Wyschnegradskys mikrotonalen Kompositionen', in Claus Ganter (ed.), Harmonik im 20. Jahrhundert (Vienna: WUV, 1993), pp. 87–100

=== Operas ===
- Adolf Wölfli, chamber opera (Graz 1981)
- Nacht, chamber opera in 24 scenes; libretto by the composer after texts by Friedrich Hölderlin (concert performance in Bregenz 1996, staged in Bregenz 1998)
- Die schöne Wunde, opera after Franz Kafka, Edgar Allan Poe and others (Bregenz 2003)
- Melancholia, opera in 3 parts; libretto by Jon Fosse after his own novel (Palais Garnier, Paris, 2008)
- Bluthaus, opera in 10 scenes (composed 2010/11); libretto by Klaus Händl; world premiere: April 2011, Schwetzingen Festival; premiere of revised version (45 minutes new music): Kampnagel, Hamburg, June 2014.
- Thomas, opera. Libretto by Klaus Händl; world premiere: May 2013, Schwetzingen Festival
- Morgen und Abend. Libretto by Jon Fosse; world premiere: Royal Opera House, 13 November 2015
- Koma. Libretto by Klaus Händl; world premiere: Schwetzingen Festival, 27 May 2016
  - KOMA, definitive version. Libretto by Klaus Händl; world premiere: Stadttheater Klagenfurt, 28 March 2019
- "Liebesgesang" chamber opera for two voices, 1 h 30 mn, Ricordi Berlin (2021)
- "Sycorax opera" for voices, actor, choir and ensemble, 1 h 20 mn, Ricordi Berlin (2021)

=== Other works ===
- Sextet for 3 violas and 3 cellos (1982)
- Drei Hommages für einen Pianisten und zwei im Abstand eines Vierteltons gestimmte Klaviere (1985)
- ...Schatten...durch unausdenkliche Wälder for 2 pianos and 2 percussionists (1992)
- Descendiendo for orchestra (1993)
- ...., double concerto for accordion, viola and chamber ensemble (1994)
- ...Einklang freier Wesen... for various instrumentations, each titled ...aus freier Lust...verbunden... (1994)
- Nacht-Schatten (1994 Bregenz)
- Fremde Welten, concerto for piano and 20 stringed instruments (1997)
- Concerto for violin and orchestra (1998)
- String Quartet No.2 (1998)
- Nach-ruf...ent-gleitend... for ensemble (1999)
- Torso for large orchestra after the unfinished Piano Sonata in C major, D.840 by Franz Schubert (1999–2000)
- in vain for 24 instruments (2000/02)
- ...sodass ich's hernach mit einem Blick gleichsam wie ein schönes Bild... im Geist übersehe (2001)
- tria ex uno for ensemble (2001–2002)
- de terrae fine for violin solo (2001)
- Blumenstück (2001)
- flow and friction for sixteenth-tone piano 4-hands (2001)
- String Quartet No.3 "In iij. Noct" (2003)
- Natures mortes for orchestra and accordion (UA Donaueschingen Festival 2003)
- String Quartet No.4 (2003)
- Opus 68 for large orchestra after Piano Sonata No.9 by Alexander Scriabin (2004)
- Concerto for cello and large orchestra (2004)
- Haiku for baritone and 10 instruments (2005)
- Ritual for 12 bass drums and 3 wind ensembles (2005)
- Sieben Klangräume, responses to the unfinished fragments of the Requiem mass by Mozart (UA Salzburg 2005)
- ....... for viola and 6 voices (2006)
- Hyperion, Konzert für Lichtstimme und Orchester (UA Donaueschingen Festival 2006)
- Bruchstück for large orchestra (2007)
- Concerto for piano and orchestra (2007)
- Les temps tiraillés for 2 violas, bassoon and electronics (2008)
- Concerto for baritone saxophone and orchestra (2008)
- antiphon for 2 contrabass clarinets (2008)
- ... und ... for chamber ensemble and electronics (2008–09)
- ... wie stille brannte das Licht for soprano and chamber ensemble (or piano) (2009)
- Unheimat for 19 string instruments (2009)
- Traum in des Sommers Nacht for orchestra (2009)
- Arthur F. Becker (od. Buhr?) for 2 vocal quartets, bass solo, clarinet, percussion and cello (2009)
- La profondeur for 13 players (2009)
- ATTHIS for soprano and 8 instruments (or for 8 instruments) (2009)
- fuga for 2 violins (2009)
- limited approximations for 6 micro-tonally tuned pianos and orchestra (2010)
- "... damit ... die Geister der Menschen erhellt und ihr Verstand erleuchtet werden ..." for ensemble (2010)
- AUS.WEG for 8 instruments (2010)
- String Quartet No.6 (2010)
- String Quartet No.7 (2011)
- "Ich suchte, aber ich fand ihn nicht." for ensemble (2011)
- Duchcov for choir of 44 voices (2011)
- chants oubliés for chamber orchestra (2011)
- SCHWEIGEN: Fukushima for soprano and lyric soprano, Lampedusa for soprano and mezzo-soprano, Mlake / Laaken for lyric soprano and countertenor (2011)
- Tetraedrite for orchestra (2011–12)
- "... e finisci già?" for orchestra (2011–12)
- Introduktion und Transsonation for 17 instruments and tape (2012)
- Dido for soprano and string quartet (2012)
- Wohin bist du gegangen? for choir and 17 instruments (2012)
- Anachronism for ensemble (2013)
- dark dreams for orchestra (2013)
- nocturno for female choir and accordion (or piano) (2013)
- Tombeau [Fragmente aus dem Fragment KV 616a] for violin, cello and piano (2013)
- petit hommage à un grand maître for piano (2013)
- Concerto grosso no. 1 (2013)
- Concerto grosso no. 2 (2014)
- LAIR for string quartet (2014)
- String Quartet No.8 (2014)
- Saxophone Quartet (2014)
- 13 Bilder aus der Oper "Die schöne Wunde" for 6 voices and chamber orchestra (2014)
- I can't breathe for trumpet (2015)
- Octet for 8 trombones (2015)
- Zugabe for orchestra (2015)
- 3 Stücke für Mollena for choir and chamber orchestra (2015–16)
- Trombone Concerto (2016)
- HYENA for narrator and chamber orchestra (2016)
- Release for strings, harp and piano (2016)
- String Quartet No.9 (2016)
- String Quartet No.10 (2016)
- das kleine ICH BIN ICH for speaker and ensemble or chamber orchestra (2016)
- Violin concerto no. 2 (2017)
- ein kleines symphonisches Gedicht für Wolfgang for orchestra (2017)
- Blumenwiese: 1 for saxophone, 2 for percussion, 3 for piano, 4 for trumpet, 5 for violin, 6 for cello and 7 for double bass, also played simultaneously (2017–20)
- framing... for clarinet, bassoon, percussion, piano, violin, viola and cello (2018)
- BTZM for string quartet (2018)
- catch as catch can for clarinet, cello and piano (2018)
- 2 Pieces: lunar eclipse and equinox for clarinet, cello and piano (2018)
- im Schatten der Harfen for ensemble (2018)
- Monolog für Graz for speaker and ensemble (2018)
- the last minutes of inhumanity, an utopic Charon-cantata for mezzo-soprano and orchestra (2018), for orchestra (2019)
- solstices for 10 instruments to be performed in complete darkness (2018)
- Iguazú superior, antes de descender por la Garganta del Diablo for percussion quartet (2018), for 1–10 percussion (2020)
- String Quartet No.11 (2019)
- Musiche per Matera for ensemble (2019)
- Sym-phonie MMXX, ballet for orchestra (2019)
- Hommage à Bridget Riley for ensemble (2019)
- Konzert für Klangwerk und Orchester for solo percussion and orchestra (2019)
- was mir Beethoven erzählt for violin, contraforte and orchestra (2020)
- hope. for brass ensemble and timpani (2020)
- 11,000 Saiten, for 50 pianos and chamber orchestra, 66 mn (2020)
- Joshua Tree for orchestra (2020)
- ...fließend... for ensemble (2020)
- Parkmusik für Grafenegg for wind band, 1 h 8 mn, Ricordi Berlin (2022)
- ungefähr ganz genau for orchestra and recording, 25 mn, Ricordi Berlin (2022)
- weiter und weiter und weiter ... for ensemble, 40 mn, Ricordi Berlin (2022)
- I don't know how to cry for orchestra, 26 mn (2023)
- die schwache Kraft for ensemble, 23 mn (2024)
- 11,000 Strings for 50 pianos, 66 mn (2025)
- Saxophone Quartet No. 2 for saxophone quartet, 38 mn (2025), dedicated to Kebyart, premiered in Madrid (Spain) on the 23rd March 2026

== See also ==
- List of Austrians in music
