= Alicante Music Festival =

The Festival de Música de Alicante (Alicante Music Festival), formerly known as Festival Internacional de Música Contemporánea de Alicante, is a Spanish annual contemporary classical music festival taking place every autumn, usually in September, in Alicante. First held in 1985, it is currently organized by the Centro Nacional de Difusión Musical (National Center for Music's Diffusion), a branch of the Spanish Ministry of Culture's Instituto Nacional de las Artes Escénicas y de la Música (National Institute of Scenic Arts and Music). It currently has a budget of €485,000, following a 17% budget cut in 2012 due to the ongoing Spanish financial crisis.

== Premieres ==
=== 2012 ===
Composer	World premieres	National premieres
(Albania) César Aliaj	...ce silence est dense	
(Spain) Benet Casablancas	Pastoral	
(Spain) Irma Catalina Álvarez	Anagnórisis II: Aurora expropiada	
(Spain) Francisco Coll	Tapias	
(Spain) Jorge Fernández Guerra	Memorias	
(Spain) Rosa Ferrer	Espígol d'estiu	
(Spain) José Luis Greco	Forbidden Tonic	
(Spain) Carles Guinovart	Septimino	
(Spain) José Iges	Poison	
(Spain) Javier Martínez Campos	Am Ufer des Rheins	
(Spain) Adolfo Núñez	Emak-Bakia	
(Spain) Medín Peirón	L'etoile de mer, Objeto para ser destruido	
(Spain) Jorge Sancho	Impromptu	
(Spain) Joseba Torre	Elegía concertante	
(Spain) Jesús Villa Rojo	Sinfonía de cámara	
(Spain) Mercedes Zavala	Cançons de l'aire	
(United Kingdom) Thomas Adès		Sonata da caccia
(Venezuela) Diana Arismendi		Las aguas australes
(Spain) Anna Bofill		Autoportrait, Le retour de la raison
(United Kingdom) Philip Cashian		Caprichos
(United Kingdom) Tansy Davies		Nature
(Switzerland) Beat Furrer		Ferner Gesang
(Spain) Oriol Graus		Corrida. Idílico
(Switzerland) Heinz Holliger		Cynddaredd-Brenddwyd
(United Kingdom) Oliver Knussen		Autumnal, Ophelia Dances, Ophelia's Last Dance
(Spain) Ramón Lazkano		Lurralde
(Spain) Eduardo Polonio		L'etoile de mer
(Finland) Kaija Saariaho		Terra memoria
(Albania) Thomas Simaku		String Quartet No. 4

Other performed composers
(United States) Leonard Bernstein
(Italy) Luciano Berio
(United Kingdom) Benjamin Britten
(Spain) Sergio Blardony
(Spain) Cristóbal Halffter
(Japan) Toshio Hosokawa
(United Kingdom) Jonathan Harvey
(Hungary) György Ligeti
(France) Olivier Messiaen
(Spain) Tomás Marco
(Spain) Xavier Montsalvatge
(Spain) Luis de Pablo
(Spain) José María Sánchez-Verdú
(Spain) Carles Santos
(Austria) Arnold Schoenberg
(United Kingdom) Humphrey Searle
(Japan) Toru Takemitsu
(Spain) Isabel Urrutia
(South Korea) Isang Yun
