= Ensemble l'Itinéraire =

The Ensemble l’Itinéraire is one of the main European ensembles dedicated to the performance of contemporary music, known in particular for its performances of spectral music works. Spectral music alters “timbres by assembling orchestral masses.” Based in Paris, the ensemble was founded in January 1973 by Michaël Lévinas, Tristan Murail, Hugues Dufourt, Gérard Grisey and Roger Tessier. Michael Levinas is the son of the philosopher Emmanuel Levinas. Many of the composers studied at IRCAM. Since its creation, it has collaborated with many composers and created hundreds of art pieces.
