= Alberto Posadas =

Spanish composer

Alberto Posadas (born 1967 in Valladolid), is a Spanish composer.

== Biography ==
Alberto Posadas was born in 1967 in Valladolid where he underwent his first musical education which he then continued in Madrid at the Madrid Royal Conservatory.

In 1988 he met Francisco Guerrero Marín with whom he studied composition and whom he considered his real master. This meeting represented an important turning point in his career. Together with Guerrero he discovered new techniques for musical form creation such as mathematical combinatorics and the fractals. Nonetheless, his determination and constant search for the integration of aesthetics in these procedures led him to employ another “model” of composing such as the translation of architectural spaces into music, the application of topology and painting techniques related to perspective or the exploration of the acoustic features of instruments at a micro level.

He explored the possibilities of electro-acoustic music developing, in a self-taught way, through various projects starting with Liturgia de silencio (1995) and continuing with more recent pieces like Snefru or Versa est in luctum (2002). His interest in investigating the application of movement to the electronic transformation of sound determined him in 2006 to become involved in a multi-disciplinary project promoted by IRCAM Paris whose premiere is scheduled for 2009.

In 2006 Alberto Posadas received a grant from the Casa Velázquez, Madrid, to develop, together with Andrés Gomis, a research project about the new interpretation techniques for bass saxophone and their application to composition.

Posadas’ compositional work is almost entirely dedicated to the instrumental genre in all its varieties: solo, duo, quartet, ensemble, orchestra, etc. 1993 represented the beginning of his career as a composer abroad. Since then, his works have been played in Austria, Germany, the US, Switzerland, Portugal, France, Canada, Belgium, etc. It was actually abroad, in Belgium, that he received his first award – the Audience Prize for his string quartet A silentii sonitu in the Ars Musica Festival, Brussels, 2002.

Part of his work has been commissioned by festivals such as Agora (Paris), Donaueschinger Musiktage (Donaueschingen), Musica Festival (Strasbourg) or Ars Musica (Brussels) as well as for Ensemble Intercontemporain, having been selected for the “Reading panel 2003/2004”. Alternatively, he received personal commissions directly from musicians, these pieces amounting to a substantial part of his solo and small ensemble work. Works for Esteban Algora, Andrés Gomis, Alexis Descharmes or Oiasso Novis among others, confirm this joint work between composer and musician.

Posadas’ music has been featured at the Wiener Musikverein of Vienna, the Encontros Gulbenkian of Lisbon as well as at the aforementioned festivals. His works have been performed by internationally acclaimed ensembles and orchestras such as Ensemble Intercontemporain, Ensembe L’itineraire, Ensemble Court-Circui't, Nouvel Ensemble Moderne, Arditti String Quartet, Orchestre National de France, Orchestre Philharmonique du Luxembourg, etc. and conducted by the prestigious conductors Arturo Tamayo, Pascal Rophé, Beat Furrer, to name but a few.

He is currently working on various parallel commissions: a work for ensemble with live electronics, dance and video for IRCAM Paris (world première in AGORA 2009); a cycle of string quartets for MUSICA Festival Strasbourg in co-production with Casa da Musica of Porto and CDMC Spain (world première in 2008) and a concerto for saxophone and orchestra for the Orquesta de la Comunidad de Madrid, commissioned by Fundación Autor Spain (world première 2008/2009).

Since 1999 his works have been published by the French publishing house Editions musicales européenes, on whose web site (www.emepublish.com ) his works catalogue and discography are on display.

Since 1991 he has worked as a teacher of analysis, harmony and composition and is often invited as a guest lecturer to courses on contemporary music in Montreal University, Aula de Música of Alcalá University (Madrid), Fundación Universidad de verano de Castilla y León, E. T. S. de Ingenieros of Autónoma University, Madrid, International Contemporary Music Festival of Alicante, Quincena Musical of San Sebastián, “Encontres” International Festival of Balearic Islands, etc. He currently works as a professor in the Music Conservatory of Majadahonda, Madrid.

In October 2011, he received the composition award in the Spain's annual Premio Nacional de Música.

== Aesthetics ==
Three compositional ideas, initially independent but often intertwined, are developed throughout Alberto Posadas’ work.

The first one is based on the use of mathematical and physical procedures, starting with systems of combinatorial mathematics and evolving towards the application of ”fractal theory”. This fusion between mathematics and music comes from a desire to put into music the systems that regulate nature. This approach has been applied to works like Apeiron for orchestra, A silentii sonitu for string quartet and Invarianza for ensemble.

A second idea delves into the acoustic possibilities of each instrument at a microscopic level, in order to produce both the musical material of a piece and its regulation. Pieces like Eridsein for flute, Sínolon for clarinet and Anábasis for tenor saxophone have been composed from this standpoint.

Finally, a third idea tries to establish a relationship between music and other arts such as architecture. The space–time association is intended while applying the inherent dimensions and proportions of an architectural piece to the different parameters of music. The Egyptian pyramids have been the models used so far for this purpose and this is reflected in pieces like Snefru for accordion and electronics or Nebmaat for saxophone, clarinet and string trio. With regard to painting, its relationship with music is examined in one of its perspective techniques – the anamorphosis – as a procedure to topologically transform music. This is the approach used in the eponymous ensemble piece Anamorfosis.

== Catalogue ==
- Apeiron (1993) for Orchestra
- Eridsein (1995) for Flute
- Pri em hru (1994) for Ensemble
- Sínolon (2000) for B-flat Soprano Clarinet
- Anábasis (2001) for Tenor Saxophone
- Snefru (2002) for accordion & electronics
- Liturgia Fractal (2003–2007) for String Quartet
- Nebmaat (2004) for Ensemble
- Anamorfosis (2006) for Ensemble
- Fulgida niebla de sol blanquecino (2010) for Bass Saxophone and Electronics
- Tradato de lo inasible (2013) for 5 instruments
