= Joshua Fineberg =

American composer

Joshua Fineberg (born July 26, 1969) is an American composer of contemporary classical music.

== Biography ==
Joshua Fineberg was born in Boston, Massachusetts. He began his musical studies at the age of five. He completed his undergraduate studies at the Peabody Conservatory with Morris Cotel where he won first prize in the bi-annual Virginia Carty de Lillo Composition Competition.

== Music career ==
He has worked with many leading composers in the United States and France, including: George Crumb, Jacob Druckman, Robert Hall Lewis, Philippe Manoury, and André Boucourechliev. In 1991, he moved to Paris and studied with Tristan Murail. The following year he was selected by the Ensemble InterContemporain reading panel for the course in composition and musical technologies. In the fall of 1997, he returned to the US to pursue a doctorate in musical composition at Columbia University, which he completed in May 1999. After teaching at Columbia for a year, he went to Harvard University where he served as the John L. Loeb Associate Professor of the Humanities until 2007. In 2007 he joined the faculty of the Boston University School of Music and became the director of their electronic music studio. In 2012, he became the founding director of the Boston University Center for New Music.

He has collaborated with IRCAM as a lecturer for seminars and as compositional coordinator for their 1996 four week summer course. Besides his compositional and pedagogical activities, he has collaborated with computer scientists and music psychologists to develop tools for computer assisted composition and in music perception research. He has worked with performing ensembles as artistic director for recordings of many European ensembles and soloists, and during the 1999–2000 season directed both Speculum Musicae (New York City) and the Columbia Sinfonietta (Boston). Fineberg edited two issues of the Contemporary Music Review on spectral music" (vol. 19, pt. 2 & 3). From 2003 to 2009 he served as the US editor of the Contemporary Music Review.

Fineberg's works include Recueil de Pierre et de sable for two harps and ensemble (commissioned by Radio France and premiered by Continuum), Veils (commissioned by Thomas Forrest Kelly and premiered by Robert Levin), and Shards (commissioned by the Fromm Music Foundation and premiered by the New Millennium Ensemble). He worked on an evening-length modern dance/theater piece with the Belgian choreographer Johanne Saunier and founding member of the Wooster Group Jim Clayburgh based on Nabokov's Lolita.

A monographic CD of his music recorded by the Ensemble Court-Circuit was released in 2002 as a part of Universal France's Accord/Una Corda collection, another CD recorded by the Ensemble FA was released by Mode Records in June 2009, and in 2012 a CD with his complete works for piano, performed by Marilyn Nonken, was released by Divine Art/Métier. Sonic Fictions, a new CD of his works was released in 2018, also by Divine Art/Métier. Major projects include an "imaginary opera" based on Vladimir Nabokov's Lolita for actor, dancers, video, ensemble and electronics realized in collaboration with JOJI; Speaking in Tongues, a concerto written for Les Percussions de Strasbourg's 50th anniversary tour, Objets trouvé written for the ensemble Court-circuit and La Quintina for string quartet and electronics written for the Arditti Quartet and premiered at the Ultraschall festival in Berlin that marked the first co-realization between the ExperimentalStudio in Freiburg and IRCAM in Paris. In June 2017, Chicago's Dal Niente Ensemble and Mocrep premiered his take my hand..., an evening-length immersive musical theater that explores ecstatic states.

== Awards and critical acclaim ==
He has won various prizes, fellowships and scholarships including: ASCAP Foundation Grants to Young Composers Competition; Ars Electronica special jury mention; Rapoport Prize in Composition from University; Arnold Salop Composition Competition; the Palache Scholarship, a scholarship to study at the American Conservatory in Fontainebleau; yearly ASCAP Awards from 1991 until he left ASCAP to join the French society SACEM in 1994; and the Randolph S. Rothschild Award in Composition. In 2011, he was named an artist fellow by the Massachusetts cultural council and in 2016 France named him a Chevalier in arts and letters.

In 1992, his work for large orchestra ORIGINS was selected by the international jury of the Gaudeamus Foundation as a finalist for the Gaudeamus International Composers Award and was premiered by the Radio Symfonie Orkest of the N.O.S. during the 1992 Gaudeamus Music Week.
