= Diana Arismendi =

Venezuelan composer (born 1962)

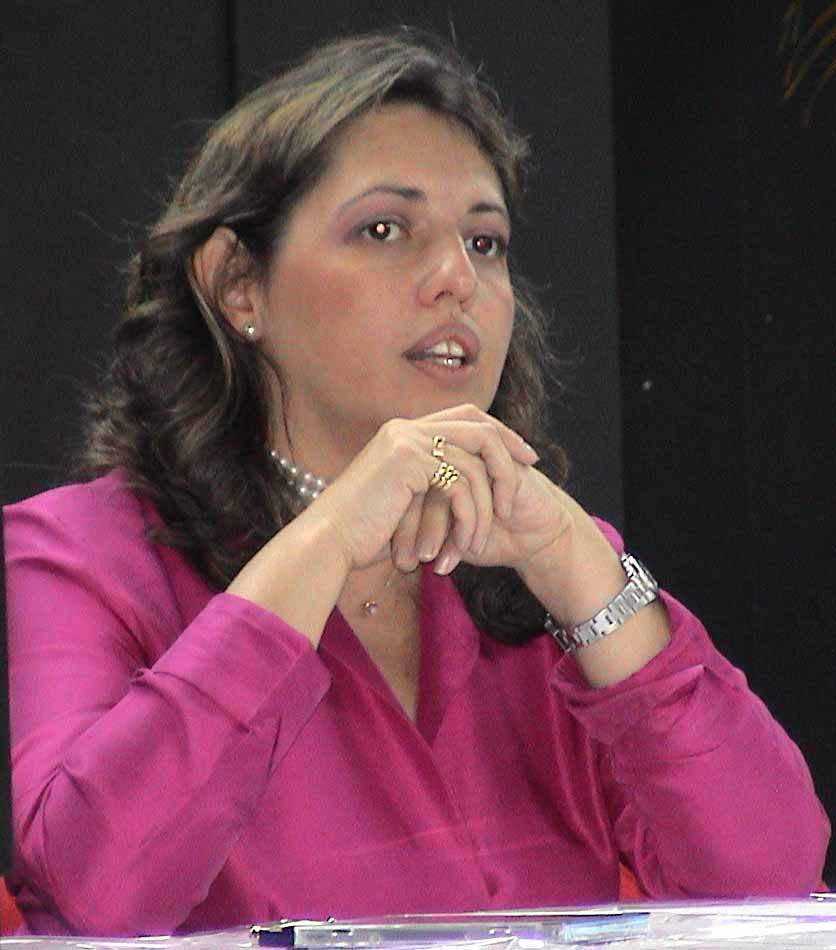
- Born: November 8, 1962 (age 63); Caracas, Venezuela
- Education: École Normale de Musique de Paris
- Occupation: Composer

Diana Arismendi (born November 8, 1962) is a Venezuelan composer.

== Life ==
Born in Caracas, Arismendi studied at the Escuela de Música "Prudencio Esáa" and at the Conservatorio Nacional de Música Juan José Landaeta, both in the city of her birth. A government scholarship afforded her the opportunity to travel to Paris for further study, and in 1982 she began lessons under Jacques Castérède and Yoshisha Taira at the École Normale de Musique de Paris; she graduated from the institution in 1986. That same year she became a professor at the Conservatorio de Música Simón Bolívar, where she remained until 1990. Another scholarship, this one from OEA, allowed her to attend the Catholic University of America, from which she received a master's degree in music in 1992 and a doctor of musical arts two years later. Arismendi has worked in various forms, including opera, and has composed a number of works for orchestra as well as chamber pieces, piano works, and choral music. She has also worked with electroacoustic media.
