= Philippe Hurel =

French composer

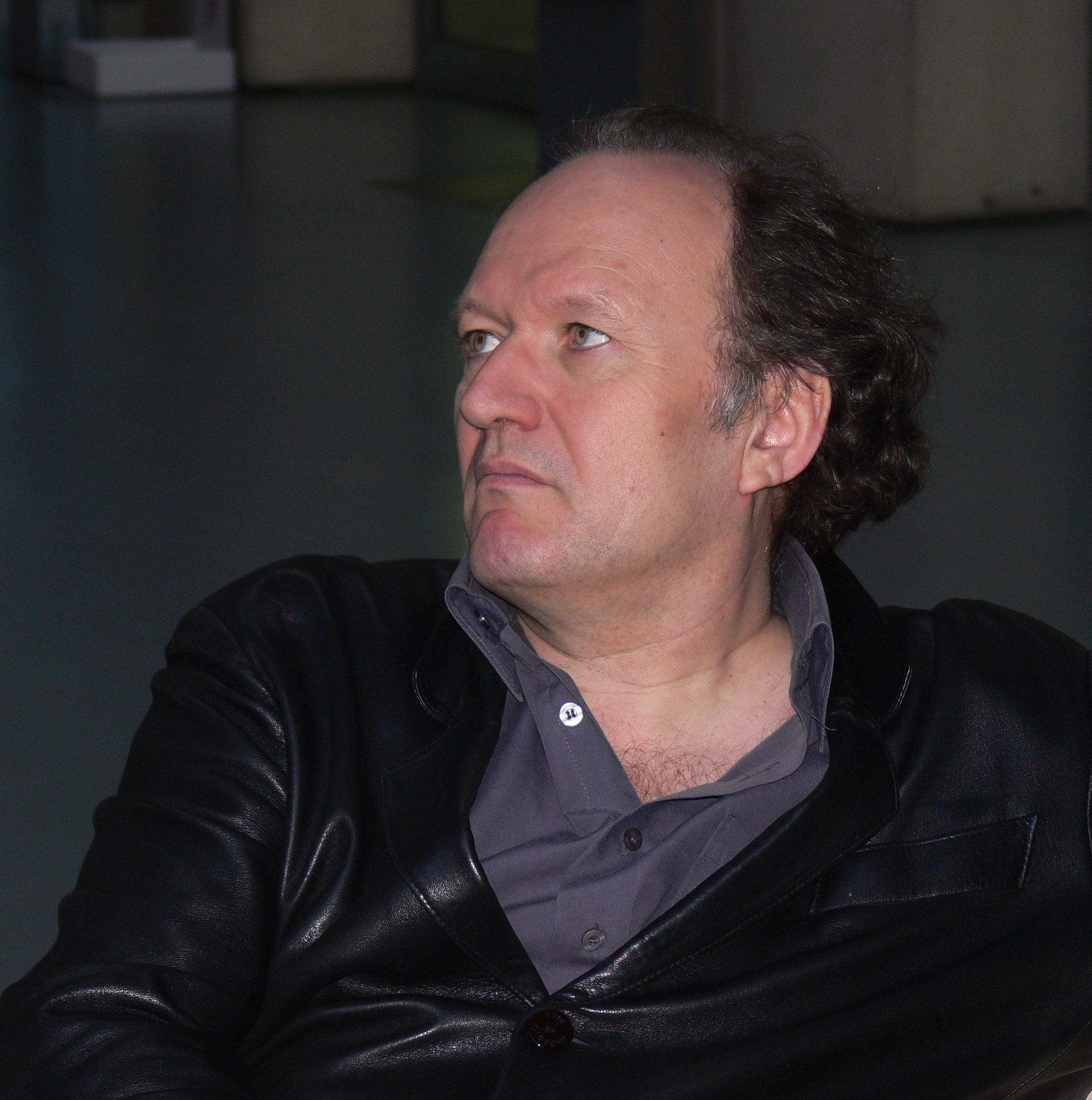
- Philippe Hurel in 2007
- Born: 24 July 1955; Domfront, Orne, France
- Occupation: Composer
- Awards: Ernst von Siemens Music Prize (1995)
- Website: www.philippe-hurel.fr

Philippe Hurel (born 24 July 1955) is a French composer of contemporary music and the artistic director of the Ensemble Court-Circuit.

== Early life and education ==
Hurel studied violin, analysis, composition and musicology at the Regional Conservatory of Toulouse. From 1981, he studied at the Paris Conservatoire, where he was a student in the classes of Ivo Malec and Betsy Jolas. In 1985-1986 and again in 1988-1989 he took part in musical research at the IRCAM.

== Personal life ==
Philippe Hurel was a resident of the Villa Medici in Rome from 1986 to 1988.
