= Hugues Dufourt =

French composer and philosopher

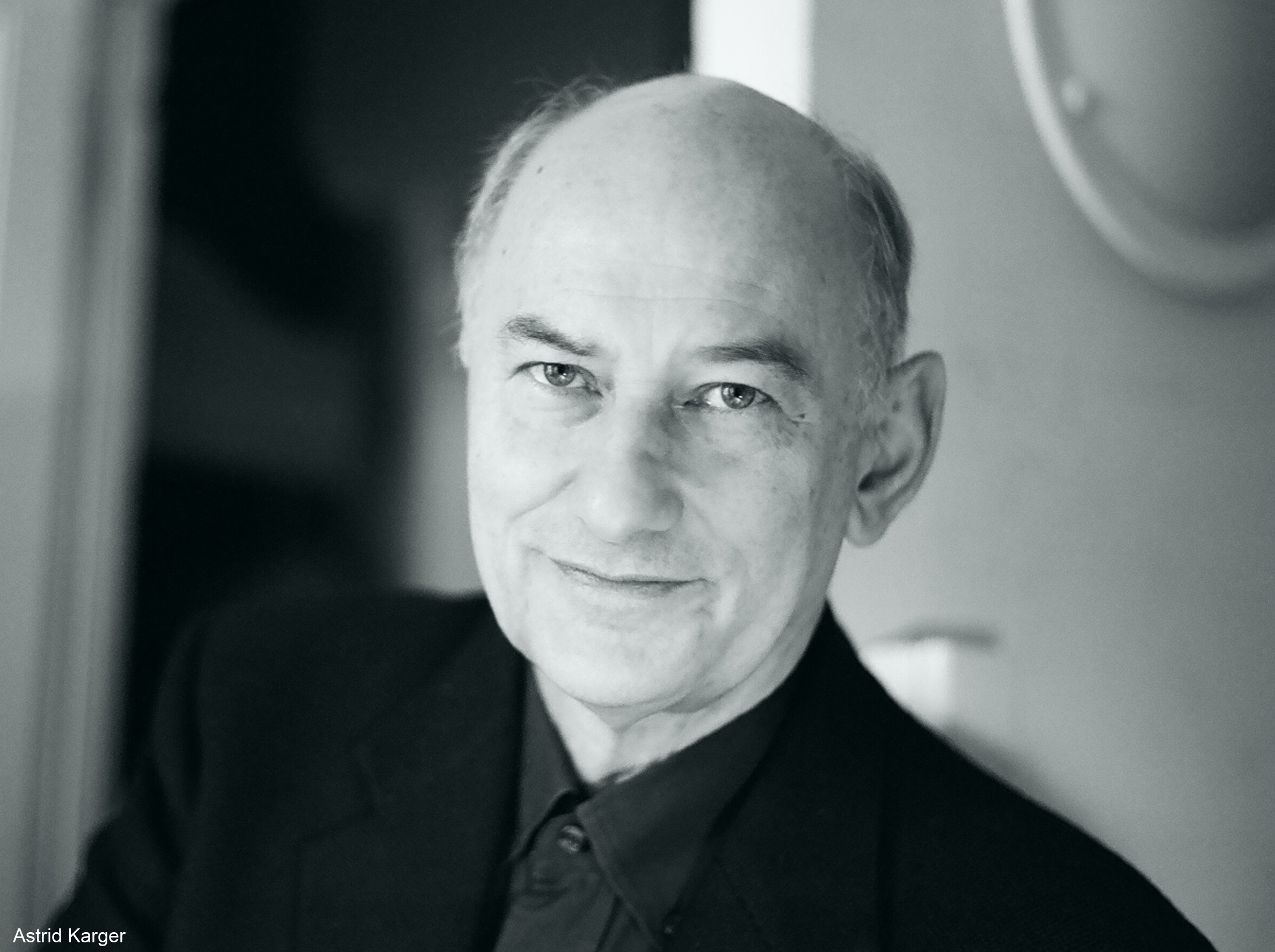
Hugues Dufourt

Hugues Dufourt (French: [dyfuʁ]) is a French composer and philosopher associated with the spectral school of composition. Born in Lyon on 28 September 1943, Dufourt studied piano and composition at the Geneva Conservatory. He studied philosophy with François Dagognet and was trained in the French epistemological tradition of Gaston Bachelard and Georges Canguilhem.

Dufourt became co-director of the Ensemble l'Itinéraire in 1973 and founded CRISS (Collectif de Recherche Instrumentale et de Synthèse Sonore—Instrumental and Sound Synthesis Research Collective) in 1977. It was for CRISS that he composed in 1978–79 his best-known work, Saturne, for percussion, wind ensemble, and electronics—a work inspired by Erwin Panofsky's analysis of etchings by Albrecht Dürer. His work Burning Bright (2014) also received five votes in a 2017 Classic Voice poll of the greatest works of art music by living composers since 2000.

Many of Dufourt's larger works have been inspired by the paintings of artists as various as Brueghel, Giorgione, Rembrandt, Poussin, Guardi, Goya, and Pollock.
