= Michaël Lévinas =

French composer and pianist

Michaël Lévinas (born 18 April 1949) is a French composer and pianist.

== Biography ==
Born in Paris, Levinas was a student of Olivier Messiaen at the Conservatoire de Paris.

As an interpreter he made several recordings, mostly for Adès. Amongst these are works by Beethoven, Fauré, Scriabin, Schubert, and the complete Well-Tempered Clavier by J.S. Bach.

His father was the philosopher Emmanuel Levinas and he is married to philosopher and musicologist Danielle Cohen-Levinas.

== Selected works ==
Lévinas' scores are largely published by Éditions Salabert, Éditions Henry Lemoine, Éditions Musicales Transatlantiques.

- Arsis et Thésis for flute (1971)
- Clov et Hamm for trombone, tuba, percussion and magnetic tape (1973)
- Appels for 11 instruments (1974)
- Froissements d'ailes for flute (1975)
- Ouverture pour une fête étrange for 2 orchestras and electroacoustic device (1979)
- Concerto pour piano espace #2 (1980)
- Les rires de Gilles for 5 instrumentalists and tape (1981)
- Arcades for viola and piano (1982)
- Arcades II for viola and 12 instruments (1982)
- La conférence des oiseaux, after a Persian tale of Attar (1985)
- La cloche fêlée for orchestra and electroacoustic device (1988)
- Voûtes for 6 percussionists (1988)
- Préfixes for 17 instrumentalists and electroacoustic device (1991)
- Rebonds for sextet and electroacoustic device (1993)
- Go-gol, Opera in 2 acts to a libretto by Frédéric Tristan after the stories of Gogol (1996)
- Les Lettres enlacées II: Fragments d'une lettre for viola solo (2000)
- Les nègres, Opera in 3 acts on Les Nègres of Jean Genet (2003)
- Les Lettres enlacées V for 2 violas (2006)
- La Métamorphose, after Metamorphosis of Kafka (2011)

== Selected bibliography ==
- Yves Balmer, Thomas Lacôte, Jean-Claire Vançon (eds.): Résonances polyphoniques. Hommage à Michaël Levinas (Paris: Centre d'édition et de recherche du Conservatoire, 2015), ISBN 2-912541-22-0.
- Pierre Albert Castanet, Muriel Joubert (eds.): La Musique de Michaël Lévinas. Vers de contrepoints irréels (Château-Gontier: Éditions Aedam musicae, 2020), ISBN 978-2-919046-65-2.
