= Murail =

Surname list

Murail is a surname. Notable people with the surname include:

- Elvire Murail (born 1958), French author and screenwriter
- Marie-Aude Murail (born 1954), French children's author
- Tristan Murail (born 1947), French composer
