= Lorris Murail =

French author (1951–2021)

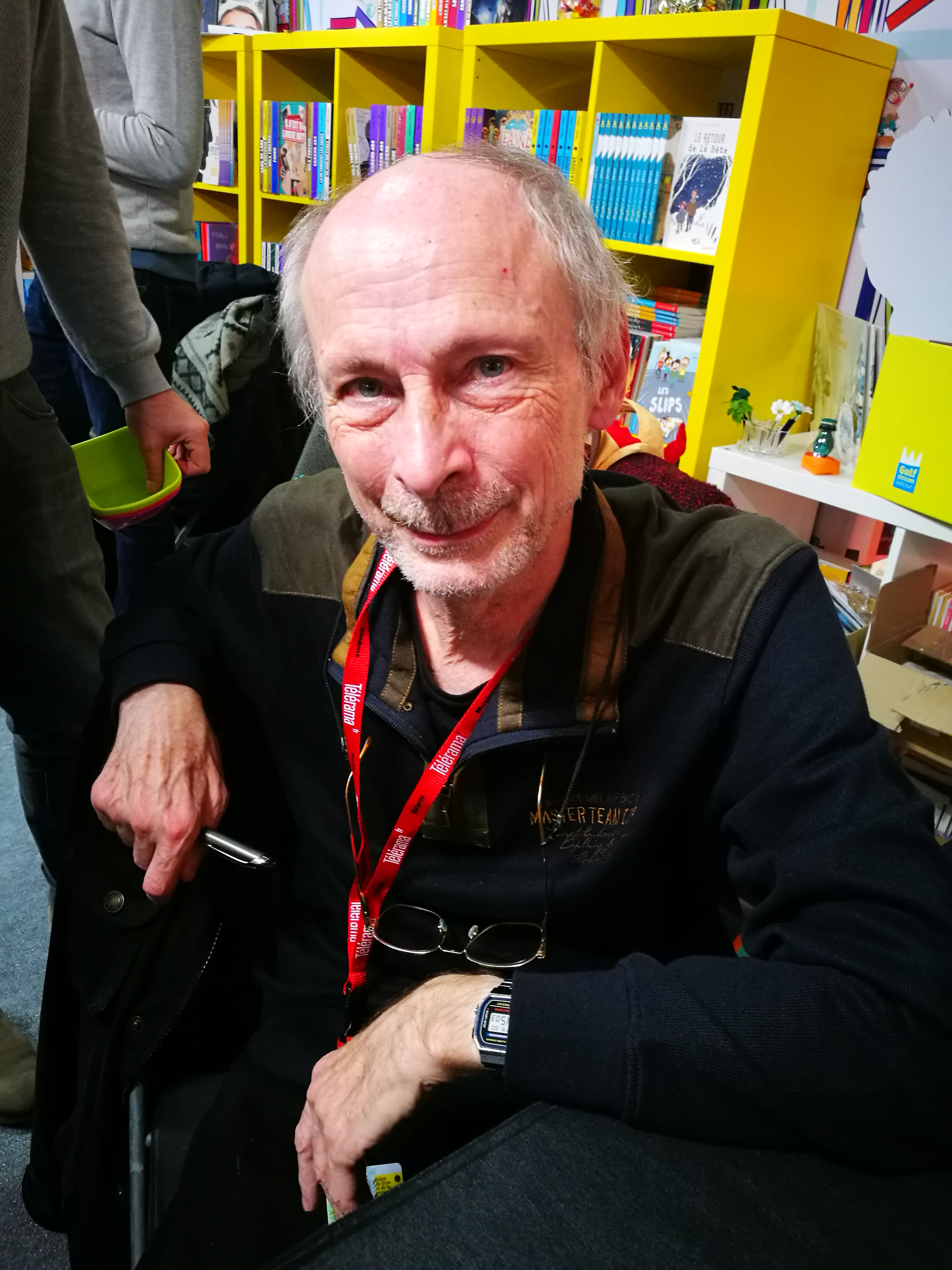
- Murail in 2018
- Born: 9 June 1951; Le Havre, France
- Died: 3 August 2021 (aged 70); Chamadelle, France
- Occupation: Author

Lorris Murail (9 June 1951 – 3 August 2021) was a French children's author. He specialized in the science fiction genre and was also a literary critic, translator and journalist.

== Biography ==
Murail studied at Sciences Po and had been writing since the age of 16. He was the son of poet Gérard Murail and journalist Marie-Thérèse Barrois, and the brother of composer Tristan Murail, writer Marie-Aude Murail, and writer Elvire Murail. In 2021, he wrote two detective novels: Angie ! and Souviens-toi de septembre !

Murail died on Chamadelle on 3 August 2021 at the age of 70.

== Works ==
=== Youth novels ===
- Le Cirque Manzano (1991)
- Le Professeur de distractions (1993)
- L'Ancêtre disparue (1994)
- La Dernière Valse (1995)
- La Course aux records (1996)
- Qui c'est celui-là ? (1998)
- Le Petit Cirque des horreurs (1999)
- Les Pommes Chatouillard du chef (2000)
- Ma Chambre, mon lit, ma mère et moi (2003)
- Le Voyage d'Ulysse (2005)
- Même pas en rêve (2005)
- Flash mob (2005)
- Foule sentimentale (20006)
- Panique en cuisine (2006)
- La Guerre de Troie (2007)
- Les Semelles de bois (2007)
- Un méchant petit diable (2007)
- Le Maléfice égyptien (2007)
- Ce que disent les nuages : roman (2009)
- Ne répète jamais ça ! (2009)
- Reality girl : roman (2010)
- L'inconnu de l'île Mathis (2011)
- Shanoé (2014)
- Lundi, couscous (2014)
- Douze ans, sept mois et onze jours (2015)
- Rien ni personne (2017)
- Chaque chose en son temps (2018)
- L'horloge de l'Apocalypse (2018)
- Vampyre (2019)
- Soleil trouble (2020)

=== Youth series ===
- Dan Martin enquête
  - Dan Martin, détective (1994)
  - Coup de blues pour Dan Martin (1996)
  - Dan Martin fait son cinéma (1998)
  - Dan Martin file à l'anglaise (1999)
  - Le Chartreux de Pam (1999)
- Les Cornes d'ivoire
  - Afirik - Petite sœur blanche (2011)
  - Septentrion - La ballade du continent perdu (2012)
  - Celle qui lève le vent (2014)

=== Comics ===
- Le Journal de Carmilla
  - Reproduction interdite (2006)
  - Une espèce en voie de disparition (2007)
  - Compensé carbone (2008)
  - Delphinothérapie (2009)
- Les enquêtes surnaturelles de Mina
  - Descente aux Enfers ! (2011)

=== Adult novels ===
- Omnyle (1975)
- L'Hippocampe (1981)
- La Grande Roue (1982)
- Blanche-Ébène (1985)
- Le Tombeau de Ridge (1990)
- La Méthode albanaise (1996)
- Guide Totem de la science-fiction (1999)
- Nuigrave (2009)
- Urbik, Orbik (2011)
