= Mortuos Plango, Vivos Voco =

Musical composition created by Jonathan Harvey

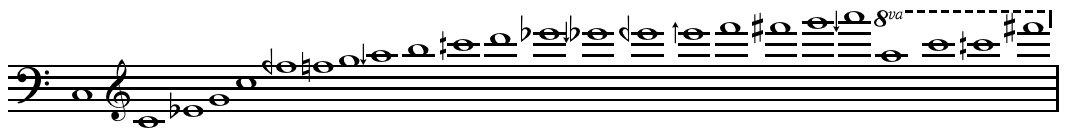
Spectrum of the tenor bell at Winchester Cathedral as analyzed by Jonathan Harvey using FFT.

Mortuos Plango, Vivos Voco ("I Mourn the Dead, I Call the Living") for eight-track tape is a musical composition created in 1980 by Jonathan Harvey, with the assistance of Stanley Haynes and Xavier Rodet, commissioned by the Centre Georges Pompidou in Paris. The two sounds contrasted are the tenor bell at Winchester Cathedral, England and the voice of the composer's son Dominic, at the time a chorister there, both recorded by John Whiting. The text is taken from that written on the bell: Horas Avolantes Numero, Mortuos Plango: Vivos ad Preces Voco ("I count the fleeing hours, I lament the dead: the living I call to prayer"). Music V was used to analyze and transform the sounds.

The music is 'octophonic', being projected into the auditorium through a cube of eight channels: "the ideal listener is 'inside' the bell, its partials distributed in space; the boy's voice flies around, derived from, yet becoming the bell sound." "The eight sections are based on one of the principal eight lowest partials. Chords are constructed from the repertoire of thirty-three partials [of the bell], and modulations from one area of the spectrum to another are achieved by means of glissandi."

The bell's spectrum, though on C, contains F harmonic series partials, "'to curiously thrilling and disturbing effect.'" "Such 'unanalyzable' secondary strike notes are quite common in bells."

The organization of the piece, "modulating 'from a bigger bell to a smaller bell,'" may, "be interpreted in a number of ways:"

1. "as a quasi-tonal procedure" ["hierarchies analogous to (but distinct from) the traditional western tonal system."]
2. "as an attempt to transfer serial processes to electronic music"
3. "as a 'prolongation' of the initial inharmonic series"
4. "'as different perspectives on an object that is always present'" per Michael Clarke

According to Curtis Roads, "Three compositions produced in the 1980s stand as good examples of compositional manipulation of analysis data: Mortuos Plango, Vivos Voco (1981) [sic] by Jonathan Harvey, Désintegrations (1983, Salabert Trajectoires) by Tristan Murail, and Digital Moonscapes (1985, CBS/Sony) by Wendy Carlos." Mortuos Plango, Vivos Voco is notable both within and without Harvey's career: "it showed the [IRCAM] institute's apparently esoteric research programme could yield music capable of appealing to a wider audience," and it "continues the process, established in the String Quartet, of initiating a work with the detailed investigation of a single sound—in this case the Winchester bell. The crucial difference is that whereas the open D string used as the basis of the earlier work may be heard as a harmonic series, the bell produces a spectrum of partials not harmonically related to one another or to the fundamental c."

== See also ==
- Song of the Bell
