= MIDI tuning standard =

Specification of precise musical pitch

MIDI Tuning Standard (MTS) is a specification of precise musical pitch agreed to by the MIDI Manufacturers Association in the MIDI protocol. MTS allows for both a bulk tuning dump message, giving a tuning for each of 128 notes, and a tuning message for individual notes as they are played.

== Frequency values ==
If f is a frequency in hertz, then the corresponding MIDI note number N_{MIDI} is given by the formula

$$N_\mathsf{MIDI} = 69 + 12 \cdot \log_2 \left(\frac{ f }{\ 440\ \mathrm{Hz}\ }\right) = 69 + \frac{ 12 }{\ \log 2\ } \log \left(\frac{ f }{\ 440\ \mathrm{Hz}\ }\right)\ ,$$

where "log" in the second expression is any logarithm (e.g. either the common logarithm log_{10} , the natural logarithm ln ≡ log_{e} , or any other).

The quantity log_{2}( f /( 440 Hz ) ) is the number of octaves above the 440 Hz concert A, or A_{4}, or a′ . Multiplying it by 12 gives the number of semitones above 440 Hz (the value is negative if the frequency f is lower in pitch than 440 Hz). Adding 69 (decimal, or 0x45 hexadecimal) gives the number of semitones above the C five octaves below middle C.

Not only is 440 Hz the standard central pitch for MIDI, it is also widely used as the concert A standard pitch (A_{4} e.g. USA, UK), and since that is represented in MIDI signals by the integer 69 (nine semitones above middle C (C_{4}, c′), which is 60 decimal or 0x3C hexadecimal), this gives a real number which expresses pitch in a manner consistent with midi and integer notation, known as the MIDI note number, N_{MIDI} .

Converting from MIDI note number (N_{MIDI}) to frequency (f) is given by the following formula:

$$\ f = 440\ \mathsf{Hz} \cdot 2^{\left[\ \left(\ N_\mathsf{MIDI}\ -\ 69\ \right)/12\ \right]}\ =  440\ \mathsf{Hz} \cdot \exp\left[\ \frac{\ \ln 2\ }{ 12 } \left(\ N_\mathsf{MIDI}\ -\ 69\ \right)\ \right] ~.$$

== Frequency Data Format ==
The frequency data format allows for the precise notation of frequencies that differ from equal temperament.

"Frequency data shall be defined in [units] which are fractions of a semitone. The frequency range starts at MIDI note 0, C = 8.1758 Hz, and extends above MIDI note 127, G = 12543.854 Hz. The first byte of the frequency data word specifies the highest equal-tempered semitone not exceeding the frequency. The next two bytes (14 bits) specify the fraction of 100 cents above the semitone at which the frequency lies. Effective resolution = 100 cents / 2^{14} = .0061 cents."

This higher resolution allows a logarithmic representation of pitch in which the semitone is divided into 128^{2} = 2^{14} = 16384 parts, which means the octave is divided into 196608 (logarithmically) equal parts. These parts are exactly 100/16384 cents (approximately 0.0061 cents) in size, which is far below the threshold of human pitch perception and which therefore allows a very accurate representation of pitch.

== Applications ==
The precision pitch values may be used in microtonal music, just intonation, meantone temperament, or other alternative tunings.

Software which supports MTS includes Scala, TiMidity++, ZynAddSubFX and FluidSynth.

Software plugin instruments which support MTS include Native Instruments FM8, Synthogy Ivory, and Xen-Arts' various xenharmonic VSTi plugins, including the FMTS FM synthesizer, Ivor virtual analog synthesizer, and XenFont SoundFont sample player.

Hardware instruments in current production which support MTS include: Dave Smith Instruments (DSI) Rev-2, Prophet-12, Prophet-6, Oberheim OB-6, Moog Sub37, Minitaur, Novation Bass Station II, Peak, Sonoclast Plastic Pitch MIDI Microtuner, and the Waldorf Kyra.

== See also ==
- Microtonal music
- Microtuner
- Musical tuning
