= IRCAM =

French research institute

Coordinates: 48°51′35″N 2°21′05″E

Western façade of the IRCAM building

IRCAM (French: Institut de recherche et coordination acoustique/musique; English: "Institute for Research and Coordination in Acoustics/Music") is a French institute dedicated to the research of music and sound, especially in the fields of avant garde and electro-acoustical art music. It is situated next to, and is organisationally linked with, the Centre Pompidou in Paris. The original building, designed by Renzo Piano and Richard Rogers, lay almost entirely underground beneath the square and fountain of Place Igor-Stravinsky. The above-ground "Piano tower" was added in 1990 by Renzo Piano alone, and two adjacent buildings, the former Jules Ferry school and the Bains-Douches baths, were converted in 1996.

== A centre for musical research ==
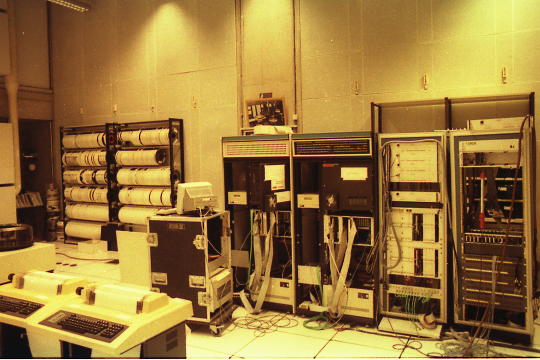
IRCAM's machine room in 1989

Several concepts for electronic music and audio processing have emerged at IRCAM. John Chowning pioneered work on FM synthesis at IRCAM, and Miller Puckette originally wrote Max at IRCAM in the mid-1980s, which would become the real-time audio processing graphical programming environment Max/MSP. Max/MSP has subsequently become a widely used tool in electroacoustic music. Many of the techniques associated with spectralism, such as analyses based on fast Fourier transforms, were made practical by technological contributions at IRCAM. For instance, researchers at IRCAM have developed a special microphone capable of isolating each of the cello's four strings for separate amplification or electronic treatment. Along with tools for sound synthesis and analysis, IRCAM has played an instrumental role in developing programs for visualization of musical form with the creation of OpenMusic, a Lisp-based visual programming language.

IRCAM provides classes to train composers in music technology. Composers who do not have programming experience to create the technology end of a piece for ensemble and electronics are provided with an assistant who helps them to realise technically intensive parts of the piece. The assistant will follow the conceptual advice of a composer with no technology experience to realize a computer part, or will help a composer who can program in Max/MSP to make their "patch" more efficient and elegant. Tristan Murail's Désintégrations is an example of a piece realized in this program by a composer with significant technological skill, whereas Harrison Birtwistle's The Mask of Orpheus required an active and creative role for the technology assistants, such as Barry Anderson and Ian Dearden.

== A cultural centre for musical modernism ==
Apart from electroacoustic programmes, IRCAM has programmes in contemporary classical music. It has disseminated music of post World War II modernist musicians such as that of Luciano Berio or Pierre Boulez, as well as younger performers and composers. Musical spectralism such as that of Tristan Murail, has also received support from IRCAM. Murail taught at IRCAM for a time. Kaija Saariaho, whose work has been influenced by spectralism, has also been supported by IRCAM.

IRCAM has also helped to develop various performance models. A resident ensemble of IRCAM, Ensemble InterContemporain, specialised in contemporary classical music, where each performer could be called upon to perform solo literature or ensemble literature. The Ensemble InterContemporain has been a model for many large ensembles in Europe, for example the Ensemble Modern and Klangforum Wien. Many classical contemporary pieces have been written for the chamber orchestra section of Ensemble InterContemporain.

There are regular concerts at IRCAM.

== History ==
In 1970 President Georges Pompidou asked Pierre Boulez to found an institution for research in music. In 1973 the section of the building underneath Place Igor-Stravinsky was finished, and IRCAM opened in 1977. From the outset, Boulez was in charge of the institute. The initial administrators included Luciano Berio, Vinko Globokar, Jean-Claude Risset, and Max Mathews. 1990 Ircam established the Cursus Program for young Composers, a training in Computer Music and Composition. In 1992 Boulez, who then became honorary director, was succeeded by Laurent Bayle. In 2002 the philosopher Bernard Stiegler became the new head of the institute. On 1 January 2006, Stiegler became Director of Cultural Development at the Centre Pompidou and was replaced by Frank Madlener.

The creation of IRCAM coincided with the rise of the debates about modernism and postmodernism in culture and the arts.

Its multimedia library was established in 1996. It is one of the first music hybrid libraries to have been created with close to 1000 hours of recorded music and over 2,000 scientific articles available online, in addition to its physical collections of sheet music and books on music and related domains.

Several international conferences have been held at IRCAM:

- ICMC, the yearly International Computer Music Conference, in 1984
- ISMIR 2002, the 3rd international conference on music information retrieval, in October 2002
- NIME-06, the 6th International Conference on New Interfaces for Musical Expression, in June 2006
- Acanthes, a yearly summer festival and series of composition workshops started in 2012

== Research and development teams ==
- Instrumental acoustics
- Room acoustics
- Music therapy
- Musical perception and cognition
- Analysis/synthesis
- Music representations
- Free software and software engineering
- Sound design
- Online services

=== Software developed at IRCAM ===
Some software is being developed at IRCAM, such as OpenMusic, AudioSculpt, OMax, Spat, Modalys, Antescofo and Orchidée.

Orchidée is developed as a tool to aid in orchestral composition in which musical scores using traditional instruments are generated by imitating a target input sound. It is used in Jonathan Harvey's 2008 piece, "Speakings", a composition based on emulating speech patterns and inflections. Orchidée is capable of computing the complex combinatorial possibilities of an orchestra based on musical attributes such as dynamics and instruments, perceptual attributes such as brightness, and timbre models.

IRCAM software is distributed via a subscription-based Forum. As of 2011, IRCAM Forum has 534 members including individual artists and art institutions around the world. IRCAM Forum members gather yearly at IRCAM for workshops regarding new technologies developed at IRCAM and elsewhere. IRCAM has also created a music file format, .sf.

In the domain of music and generative artificial intelligence IRCAM has developed a learning framework for generating a neural network model from audio data named RAVE (Realtime Audio Variational autoEncoder) and that allows both fast and high-quality audio waveform synthesis (20x real-time at 48 kHz sampling rate on standard CPU). Models can be used in real time for various applications, audio generativity/timbre transformation/transfer either as a VST plugin or using Max/MSP.

There are also partnerships with companies such as Cycling 74 (Max/MSP) and Flux:: (IRCAM Tools) for the development of proprietary software.

== Notable works composed at IRCAM ==
- Hanspeter Kyburz: ΟΥΤΙΣ, music theatre for ensemble and electronics (2000–2012)
- Georges Aperghis: Machinations, musical spectacle for four women and computer (2000)
- Clarence Barlow: Çogluotobüsisletmesi, versions for piano (1978), magnetic tape (1980), and piano with tape (1980)
- George Benjamin: Antara for ensemble and electronics (1986–87)
- Luciano Berio: Chemins ex V, for clarinet and 4C computer (1980)
- Luciano Berio: Orfeo II, opera for voice, orchestras, and tapes (1984)
- Luciano Berio: La Voix des voies, spectacle-exposition for tape and diaporama (1977)
- Harrison Birtwistle: The Mask of Orpheus (1986)
- Pierre Boulez: Anthèmes II, for violin and electronics (1997)
- Pierre Boulez: Dialogue de l'ombre double, for clarinet and tape (1985); version for bassoon and electronics (1995)
- Pierre Boulez: ...explosante-fixe..., version for two flutes, MIDI-flute, electronics, and orchestra (1993)
- Pierre Boulez: Répons, for six soloists, chamber ensemble, electronic sounds, and live electronics (1981–1984)
- John Cage: Roaratorio, an Irish Circus on Finnegans Wake (1980)
- Unsuk Chin: Double Bind? for violin and electronics (2006)
- John Chowning: Stria, for magnetic tape (1977)
- Chaya Czernowin: "Hidden", for string quartet and electronics (2014)
- Edison Denisov: Sur la Nappe d'un étang glacé, for nine instruments and tape (1991)
- Luis de Pablo: Tornasol (1980–81)
- Michel Decoust: Interphone, for soprano and tape (1977)
- Jacob Druckman: Animus IV (1977)
- Pascal Dusapin: To Be Sung, chamber opera in 43 numbers (1992–93)
- Karlheinz Essl: Entsagung (1993) for ensemble and electronics
- Lorenzo Ferrero: Ombres (1984) for ensemble and live electronics
- Luca Francesconi: Etymo (1994)
- Rolf Gehlhaar: Pas à pas, for tape and spatialization equipment (1981)
- Gérard Grisey: Les Chants de l'Amour, for twelve mixed voices and magnétic tape (1982–1984)
- Georg Friedrich Haas: Les temps tiraillés, for 2 violins, bassoon, and electronics (2008)
- Jonathan Harvey: Advaya, for cello and electronics (1994)
- Jonathan Harvey: Bhakti (1982)
- Jonathan Harvey: Mortuos Plango, Vivos Voco, for concrete sounds treated by computer (1980)
- Jonathan Harvey: Ritual Melodies, for magnetic tape (1990)
- Jonathan Harvey: String Quartet No. 4 with live electronics (2003)
- Jonathan Harvey: Speakings, for orchestra and live electronics (2008)
- York Höller: Antiphon, for string quartet and tape (1977)
- York Höller: Arcus (1978)
- York Höller: The Master and Margarita, opera in two acts after the novel by Mikhail Bulgakov (1989)
- York Höller: Résonance (1982)
- Panayiotis Kokoras: Morphallaxis (2008) for ensemble and electronics
- Barbara Kolb: Millefoglie (1985)
- Philippe Leroux: M for ensemble and electronics
- Michaël Lévinas: Rebonds (1993)
- Magnus Lindberg: Joy for orchestra and electronics
- Magnus Lindberg: Related Rocks for two pianos, two percussionists, and electronics (1997)
- Magnus Lindberg: Ur (1986)
- Luca Lombardi: Hasta que caigan las puertas del odio, for choir (1977)
- Tod Machover: Soft Morning, City!, for soprano, contrabass and tape (1980)
- Tod Machover: VALIS, opera for six voices, 4X computer, and images (1986–87/1988)
- Mesías Maiguashca: Fmélodies, for ensemble and tape (1982)
- Philippe Manoury: Jupiter for flute and live electronics
- Philippe Manoury: Pluton for piano and live electronics
- Philippe Manoury: En Echo for soprano voice and live electronics
- Yan Maresz: Sul Segno, for harp, guitar, cymbalon, contrabass and electronic equipment (2004)
- Tristan Murail: L'Esprit des dunes, for chamber ensemble (1993–1994)
- Emmanuel Nunes: Lichtung I (1988/1991)
- Emmanuel Nunes: Lichtung II, for chamber ensemble and electronics (1996)
- Michael Obst: Kristallwelt, for Ensemble and Electronics (1983)
- Robert H.P. Platz: Pièce noire, for thirteen musicians and tape (1990)
- Henri Pousseur: Liège à Paris (1977)
- Horațiu Rădulescu: Incandescent Serene, for contrabass and tape (1982)
- Roger Reynolds: The Angel of Death, for solo piano, chamber orchestra, and six-channel computer-processed sound (2001)
- Roger Reynolds: Archipelago, for orchestra and magnetic tape (1983)
- Terry Riley: Salome Dances for Peace, for string quartet (1986)
- Jean-Claude Risset: Inharmonique, for soprano and tape (1977)
- Jean-Claude Risset: Mirages, for six musicians and tape (1978)
- Jean-Claude Risset: Songes (1979)
- Manuel Rocha Iturbide: Transiciones de Fase, for brass quartet and electronics (1994)
- Frederic Rzewski: Instrumental Studies (1977)
- Kaija Saariaho: Lonh, for soprano and electronics (1995–96)
- Kaija Saariaho: NoaNoa, for flute and electronics (1992)
- Karlheinz Stockhausen: Kathinkas Gesang als Luzifers Requiem, version for flute and 6-channel tape (1985)
- Marco Stroppa: In cielo, in terra, in mare, radiophonic opera on texts by Adolfo Moriconi (1992)
- Jukka Tiensuu: Nemo for ensemble (1992)
- Alejandro Viñao: Epitafios, for mixed choir and electronics (1999)
- David Wessel: Antony (1977)
- David Wessel: Contacts Turbulents, for saxophone and electronics (1986)
- Trevor Wishart: VOX-5, an electroacoustic piece based around extended vocal techniques (1986)
- James Wood: Mountain Language, for alphorn, cow bells, MIDI keyboard and electronics (1998)
- Iannis Xenakis: Psappha, electronic version (1976/1996)
- Frank Zappa: Perfect Stranger (1984)
- Hans Zender: Lo Shu III, for flute and twenty-four instrumentalists (1979)

== Affiliations ==
IRCAM is part of a consortium with Stanford's Center for Computer Research and Acoustics (CCRMA) and the Center for New Music and Audio Technologies (CNMAT) in Berkeley, California.

== See also ==
- Elektronmusikstudion, Stockholm
- GRIM (Groupe de recherche et d'improvisation musicales), Marseille
- SDIF (Sound Description Interchange Format), developed at IRCAM and CNMAT
- STEIM (Studio for Electro Instrumental Music), Amsterdam
- WORM, Rotterdam studio and venue
- List of music software
