= SDIF (disambiguation) =

SDIF is the Sound Description Interchange Format.

SDIF or S.D.I.F. may also refer to:

- Six Days in Fallujah, a video game by Highwire Games
- Standard Generalized Markup Language, SGML Document Interchange Format (SDIF), ISO 9069:1988
