= Éric Humbertclaude =

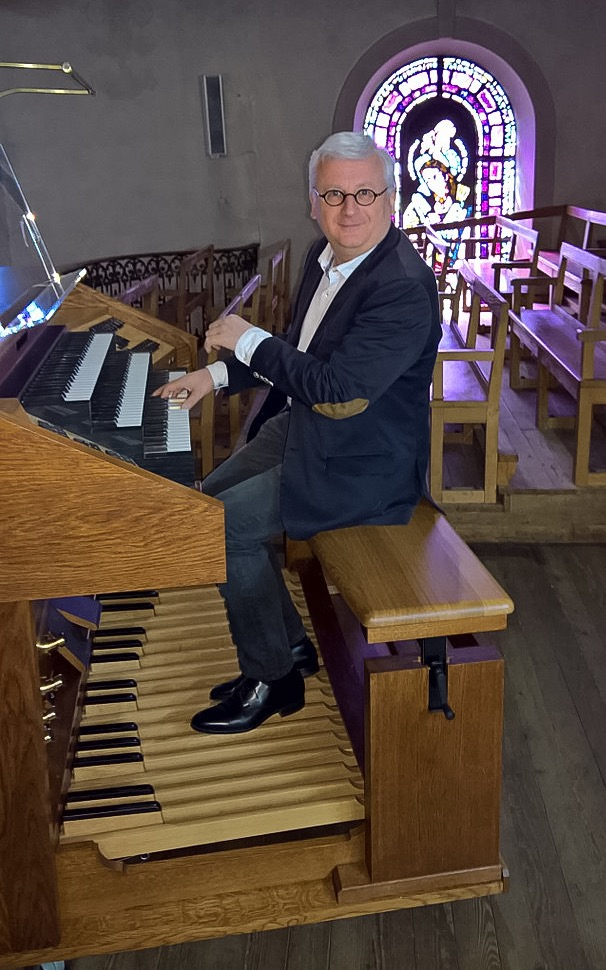
- Eric Humbertclaude at the organ of the church of Saint Laurent de La Bresse in 2017
- Born: 5 May 1961 (age 65); Saint-Dié-des-Vosges, France
- Occupations: Classical organist; Musicologist; Writer

Éric Humbertclaude (born 5 May 1961) is a French musician, organist, contemporary composer, writer and essayist, musicologist, researcher specializing in contemporary music and pipe organ music.

== Biography ==
Born in the Vosges département, Éric Humbertclaude spent his child youth in La Bresse in the same département. He made contact with music as an instrumentalist of the municipal harmony of the commune then was introduced to the pipe organ of the Saint Laurent church.

As an adult, he left his native region for Paris. At 21, he became an organist as occasional replacement of Léon Souberbielle at the organ of the choir of the Église de la Trinité, while attending the organ class of André Fleury at the Schola Cantorum de Paris. At the same time, he turned to contemporary music and, since the 1980s, frequented spectral composers such as Tristan Murail, Gérard Grisey and Hugues Dufourt.

Interested in contemporary composition, he developed a computer platform to help with composition and wrote several books on musical creation. He wrote the first synthesis on the thought of Pierre Boulez and rediscovered the life and work of the musicographer Pyotr Suvchinsky, 5 October 1892 in St-Petersburg – 24 January 1985 in Paris.

Humbertclaude is the author of a work of microhistory about Federico Gualdi, alchemist and resident engineer of Venice around 1660.

In 2013, he returned to his favorite instrument, the organ, for which he was preparing a project to create a new instrument, the 2020 organ, "adapted to modern times".

As of 2017, he prepares the edition of the complete works, which he found, of the organist and composer Jean-Claude Touche (1926–1944), killed at a very young age by a German bullet at the end of the Second World War.

== Literary style ==
Christine Labroche describes Éric Humberclaude's style as "sometimes complex or poetically elliptical and of dense prose complicated by the very dense notes provided at the foot of the page, almost a work in itself", and specifies that "it is clearly aimed at a cultured public who holds certain keys in advance and who takes an intellectual pleasure in the relative esotericism but sought out purpose." She notes that "one nevertheless feels in filigree a permanent conviction, a sincerity without fault and a completely refreshing commitment ".

== Publications ==
Essays on music and creation

- Le reflet d'une oreille, in 20eme siècle : images de la musique française : textes et entretiens, Sacem/Papiers, 1986 (réimpression anastatique dans Hugues Dufourt : un univers bruissant, cf. infra);
- Les modèles perceptuels par simulation instrumentale dans les œuvres de Tristan Murail, Dissonance, No 13, Lausanne, 1987 (reissue: La Revue musicale, No. 421-424, Paris, 1991);
- (Re)lire Souvtchinski, texts chosen by Eric Humbertclaude, La Bresse : E. Humbertclaude, 1990, 301 p. ISBN 2-9504826-0-0;
- The Challenge of Tristan Murail's Work, Homestudio, revue Audiolab, Free, 1999 read online;
- La transcription dans Boulez et Murail : de l’oreille à l’éveil, L’Harmattan, Univers musical, 1999, 98 p. ISBN 2-7384-8042-X;
- Empreintes : regards sur la création musicale contemporaine, L’Harmattan, Univers musical, 2009, 82 p. ISBN 978-2-296-06979-4;
- La liberté dans la musique (Beethoven, Souvtchinski, Boulez), Aedam Musicae, 2012, ISBN 978-2-919046-05-8;
- La musique, les pieds sur terre, Aedam Musicae, 2012 (text appeared in "La liberté dans la musique");
- Hugues Dufourt : un univers bruissant, L’Harmattan, Univers musical, 2012, 74 p. ISBN 978-2-336-00448-8;
- La création à vif : musique & corps en éveil, coauthor: Fabienne Gotusso, L'Harmattan, Univers musical, 2013, 102 p. ISBN 978-2-343-01954-3;

Collective Essay

- Pierre Souvtchinski, cahiers d’étude, under the direction of Éric Humbertclaude. [Authors:] Konrad Walterskirchen (Austria), Elena Poldiaeva (Russia) and Sergei Glebov (USA), L’Harmattan, Univers musical, 2006, 238 p. ISBN 2-296-01208-6

Tales

- Federico Gualdi à Venise : Fragments retrouvés (1660-1678) : recherches sur un exploitant minier alchimiste, L’Harmattan, 2010, 368 p. ISBN 978-2-296-13092-0 read online;
- Récréations de Hultazob, L’Harmattan, Écritures, 2010, 96 p. ISBN 978-2-296-12546-9;

Poetry

- Joue, je pense à toi, L’Harmattan, Accent tonique, Poésie, 2011, 60 p. ISBN 978-2-296-55242-5;
- Bascule followed by Vulnus, L’Harmattan, Écritures, 2012, 90 p. ISBN 978-2-336-00443-3;

Éditions L'Harmattan

- Écrit la nuit. Rencontre avec les créateurs;
- Échos en jachère;

Musical transcriptions (sheet music)

- Johannes Brahms, Trois Préludes posthumous opus 122 for Sextet (vents et cordes), transcription de chorals pour orgue, Aedam Musicae, 2010;
- Jean-François Tapray, Cinq pièces inédites pour orgue, Delatour, 2015;
- Jean-Claude Touche, Œuvres complètes

Produit multimédia sur l'orgue

- Le Grand-Orgue de la Basilique St-Pierre et St-Paul de Luxeuil-les-Bains, cointerpreter: Pierre Doillon

== Bibliography ==
- Federico Barbierato (2012). The Inquisitor in the Hat Shop : Inquisition, Forbidden Books and Unbelief in Early Modern Venice. London [etc.]: Routledge, Taylor & Francis group. p. 46. ISBN 978-1-4094-3547-1.;
- Joshua Fineberg (2000). Spectral music : aesthetics and music. Amsterdam: Harwood Academic. p. 113.;
- Martin Grabow (2016). Erfindung Recycling Neukomposition : Untersuchungen zur inneren Verflochtenheit des Lebenswerks von Pierre Boulez am Beispiel des Notations (in German). Hildesheim [etc.]: Olms. p. 232. ISBN 978-3-487-15366-7.;
- Tamara Levitz (2012). Modernist Mysteries : Perséphone. Oxford: Oxford University Press. p. 301. ISBN 9780199730162.;
- Tamara Levitz (2013). Stravinsky and his World. Princeton: Princeton University Press. p. 227. ISBN 9780691159881.;
- Jim Samson (2013). Music in the Balkans. Leiden: Brill. p. 227. ISBN 978-90-04-25037-6.;
- Catherine Steinegger (2012). Pierre Boulez et le théâtre : de la Compagnie Renaud-Barrault à Patrice Chéreau (in French). Wavre: Mardaga. p. 362. ISBN 978-2-8047-0090-4.;
- Richard Taruskin (2016). Russian Music at Home and Abroad : New Essays. Oakland: University of California Press. p. 438. ISBN 9780520288089.;
- Joachim Telle (2013). Alchemie und Poesie. Deutsche Alchemikerdichtungen des 15. bis 17. Jahrhunderts (in German). Berlin: De Gruyter. p. 1014. ISBN 978-3-11-029038-7.;
- Simon Trezise (publisher) (2015). The Cambridge companion to French music. Cambridge: Cambridge University Press. p. 197. ISBN 978-0-521-87794-7.;
