= Désintégrations =

Désintégrations, for 17 musical instruments and computer generated tape (1982–83) is a musical composition of spectral music by Tristan Murail, commissioned for IRCAM, Paris. The piece is more discontinuous than Murail's earlier composition Gondwana, owing in part to the use of dramatic silences throughout and particularly in the 6th section. According to Julian Anderson,

"although the tape does not attempt to 'simulate' any particular instrument, an organic unity between it and the orchestra is established such that the two blend perfectly. The title refers to this process of voyaging inside sounds and exploring their inner life; sounds melt before us, allowing us to discover their interior."

Curtis Roads has said that "three compositions produced in the 1980s stand as good examples of compositional manipulation of analysis data: Mortuos Plango, Vivos Voco (1981) by Jonathan Harvey, Désintegrations (1983, Salabert Trajectoires) by Tristan Murail, and Digital Moonscapes (1985, CBS/Sony) by Wendy Carlos."

The piece has been recorded by the Ensemble l'Itinéraire.

== See also ==
- Synchronisms
