= Wendy Carlos scales =

Musical scale invented by Wendy Carlos

Wendy Carlos devised several musical scales. Several are non-octave repeating scales, which Carlos named alpha, beta, and gamma. Each approximates just intervals using multiples of a single interval. She also used the upper partials of the harmonic series to tune a chromatic scale. Carlos showcased these scales on her 1986 album Beauty in the Beast.

== Background ==
As a teenager, Wendy Carlos was fascinated by alternate tunings and experimented on her parents' piano. She admired Harry Partch's microtonal music but felt he made a mistake by designing instruments that had rapid decay and weak overtones.

A 1980 study devised a method of comparing alternate tunings to consonant intervals. Carlos plugged asymmetric ratios into the model and noticed several distinct peaks of consonance. When each of the three peaks was doubled, Carlos found similar consonance. Carlos recalled, "since this is virgin territory, like Christopher Columbus I hereby christen these three peaks in the plot Carlos Alpha, Beta, and Gamma."

The practical breakthrough came when Stoney Stockwell explained to Carlos how to access a synthesizer's tuning table, where pitch frequencies are stored. She was able to reverse engineer the equally tempered table into a new software with a 1.5 cent resolution, which enabled her to implement the microtunings.

Carlos' 1984 album, Digital Moonscapes, showcased the virtual orchestra she dubbed the "LSI Philharmonic" in reference to large-scale integration computer chips. It represented a peak of what she felt she could do with standard synthesizer timbres. For her next album, Carlos developed alternate tunings in order to generate new timbres. Beauty in the Beast features music written in these tuning systems.

In 1987, Carlos wrote about her tuning experiments in Computer Music Journal (CMJ). The issue included a vinyl flexi disc with several recordings that demonstrated the unique timbres she created. The soundsheet also included excerpts from Beauty in the Beast and her 1987 album Secrets of Synthesis. In 2006, CMJ reissued the contents of its vinyl inserts on DVD.

== Alpha scale ==
The steps of the alpha scale are 78 cents. In a traditional octave with a 2:1 tuning ratio, the alpha scale yields 15.385 steps. There are four steps to the minor third, five to the major third, and nine to the perfect fifth.

The alpha scale produces "wonderful triads". Initially, Carlos overlooked inversions of the alpha scale. She discovered that they yield "excellent harmonic seventh chords", which is part of why the alpha scale was one of Carlos' favorite tunings.

== Beta scale ==
The steps of the beta scale are 63.8 cents. That yields 18.809 steps per traditional octave. The beta scale has five steps to the minor third, six to the major third, and eleven to the perfect fifth. Carlos developed the beta scale by splitting a perfect fourth evenly in half. The scale is very similar to alpha, but its sevenths are more in tune.

== Gamma scale ==
The steps of the gamma scale are 35.1 cents. That yields 34.188 steps per traditional octave. The gamma scale divides the minor third into 9 steps, the major third into 11, and the perfect fifth into 20 steps. Carlos joked that gamma has "too many notes".

Carlos felt the gamma scale produced "nearly perfect triads", but it was too unwieldy to use on Beauty in the Beast. She described it as a "third flavor" that fell between alpha and beta.

== Harmonic scale ==
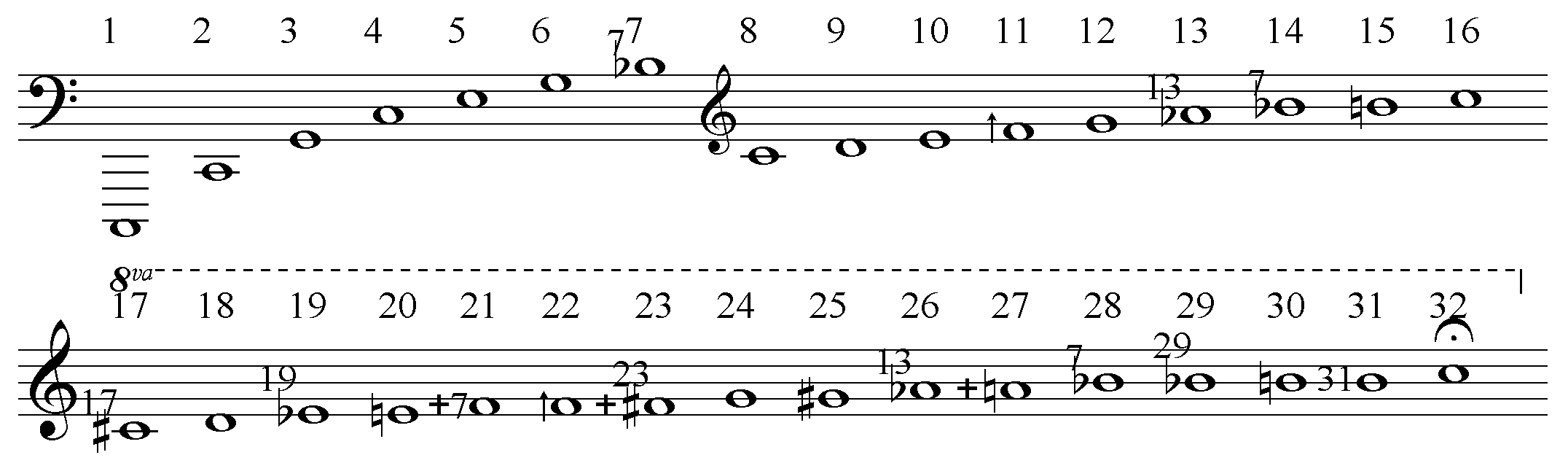
Harmonic series above C.

Harmonic scale
Note	Ratio	Cents
C	1:1	0.000
D♭	17/16	104.955
D	9/8	203.910
E♭	19/16	297.513
E	5/4	386.314
F	21/16	470.781
F♯	11/8	551.318
G	3/2	701.955
A♭	13/8	840.528
A	27/16	905.865
B♭	7/4	968.826
B	15/8	1088.269

Carlos derived a chromatic scale from the fifth octave of the harmonic series. The scale begins on the 16th partial and runs to the 32nd, omitting numbers 23, 25, 29, and 31. Carlos called this a harmonic scale.

To enable modulation, Carlos transposed the harmonic scale on all 12 chromatic pitches to generate a theoretical division of the octave into 144 steps.

In practice, she would retune the scale by triggering different fundamentals on a keyboard controller. The harmonic scale is employed in "That's Just It" and "Just Imaginings" on Beauty in the Beast. The track ends with a cycle of fifths in perfect tuning.

Versions of Carlos' harmonic scale have also been used by Ezra Sims and Franz Richter Herf.

== Approximations ==
Carlos derived the alpha, beta, and gamma scales by dividing the octave asymmetrically. She found the results to be a pleasing iteration of just intonation and decided to create artificial octaves with various hardware. Ignoring the octave's natural ratio allowed her to focus on generating justly tuned triads.

Mathematicians have approximated Carlos' scales by different means. Minimizing the mean square deviation makes the approximation more accurate. The beta scale's first five steps approximate a minor third in its traditional 6:5 ratio, six steps yield the 5:4 major third, and the 3:2 perfect fifth has eleven steps. The proportion of each scale degree can be expressed mathematically:

$\frac{11\log_2{(3/2)}+6\log_2{(5/4)}+5\log_2{(6/5)}}{11^2+6^2+5^2}\approx0.05319411048$ and $0.05319411048\times1200=63.832932576$

== Audio examples ==
Alpha scale

- Alpha scale minor third on C.mid
- Alpha scale step on C.mid
- Alpha scale major triad on C.mid
- Alpha scale minor triad on C.mid
- Alpha scale harmonic seventh chord on C.mid

Beta scale

- Beta scale step on C.mid
- Beta scale perfect fourth on C.mid
- Beta scale 15 steps on C.mid
- Beta scale major triad on C.mid
- Beta scale minor triad on C.mid
- Beta scale dominant seventh on C.mid

Gamma scale

- Gamma scale step on C.mid
- Gamma scale neutral third on C.mid

== See also ==
- 19 equal temperament
- Bohlen–Pierce scale
