= Carl Eitz =

German acoustician and music educator

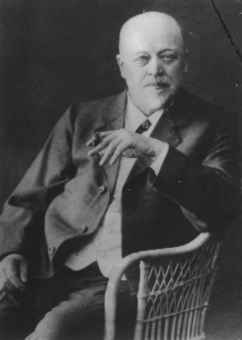
Carl Eitz.

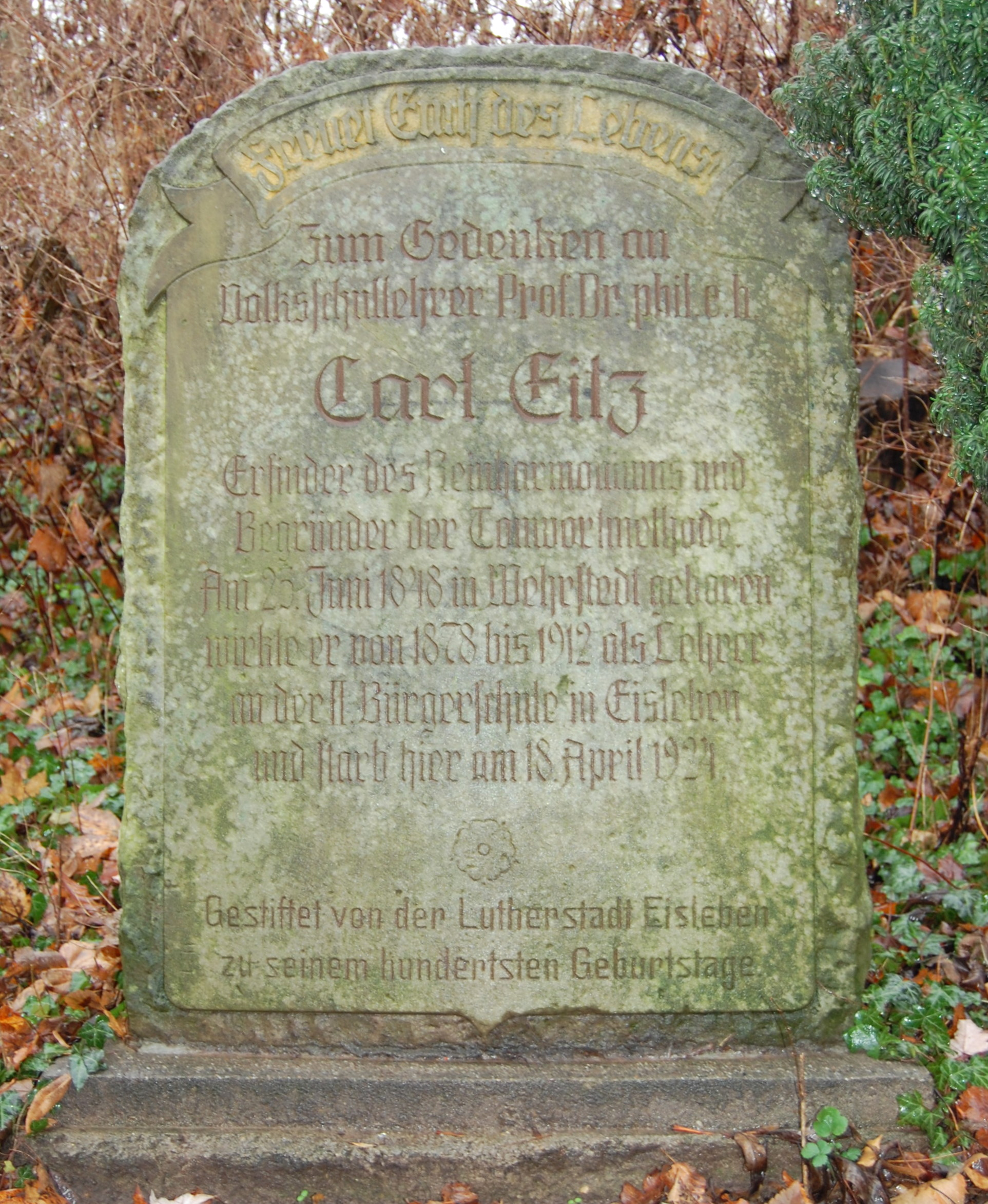
Memorial in Eisleben.

Carl Eitz (25 June 1848, Wehrstedt, Halberstadt – 18 April 1924, Eisleben) was a German acoustician and music educator.

== Life ==
Carl Eitz was the son of a gardener, and showed, in particular areas of math and physics whiz. Under difficult conditions, he became a teacher. From 1870 to 1872 he was organist and teacher in Dalldorf, and then work over many years as a teacher at the Second Eisleber public school, where he also worked as a scientist. So he invented the Tonwortsystem [ton: sound, wort: word] (Latonisation), which found application in all schools in Germany, and the pure harmonium, a reed organ with a mathematically pure sentiment. As acoustician and music educator, he his influence was recognized among scientific figures of his time such as Max Planck and Hermann von Helmholtz. Since 1918, full professor, his achievements in musical acoustics were honored in 1922 by the award of Honorary Doctor of the University of Kiel. The Prussian Ministry of Culture awarded him an honorary doctorate.

== Honors ==
In 1948 the town of Eisleben created a memorial stone to commemorate the 100th Birthday of the educators. The Carl Eitz-stone was erected at the foot of Scherbelberges. Also in Eisleben at the Carl Eitz-way at the New Cemetery, on the upper west wall, a bust was placed as a tomb. On the accompanying relief singing children are presented. Above that is the saying, "Rejoice OF LIFE."

The Carl Eitz-School in Pinner is named after the inventor of Tonwortsystem.

== Works ==
- Das mathematisch-reine Tonsystem [The mathematically pure-tone system], 1891.
- Das Tonwort, Leipzig 1928.
