= Elvire Murail =

French writer

Elvire Murail (born 7 June 1958, in Le Havre) is a French writer, mainly of books for the youth, under the pen name Moka. The daughter of poet Gérard Murail, she is the younger sister of writers Marie-Aude and Lorris Murail, and composer Tristan Murail.

== Biography ==
A graduate of University of Cambridge, she began her literary career with adult novels. She enjoyed success with her first book, Escalier C, which was brought to the cinema by Jean-Charles Tacchella in 1984.

After signing four novels for adults, she entered youth literature in 1989 under the pseudonym Moka. She signed with this pseudonym more than seventy novels for the youth, published mainly at École des Loisirs in the "Mouche", "Nine" and "Medium" series. These novels were for the most part books of mysteries between police and fantasy for adolescents from 10 to 15 years old.

Since 1996, she has been committed to defending a quality youth literature within the "Charte des Auteurs et Illustrateurs pour la Jeunesse" of which she was treasurer from 1999 to 2007. She was also the Permanent Commissioner for General Affairs of Sofia (Société française des intérêts des auteurs de l'écrit) until 2007. She is a member of the Société des gens de lettres and the société des auteurs et compositeurs dramatiques.

She also works as a screenwriter and dialogue writer for film and television.

== Literary works ==
=== Under her name ===
- 1983: Escalier C
- 1984: La Plume de perroquet
- 1987: Les Mannequins d'osier
- 1990: Bingo !

=== Under the pseudonym Moka ===
- La Lanterne bleue, 1991, illustrations by Yvan Pommaux
- Ailleurs (trilogy)
  1. Ailleurs, rien n'est tout blanc ou tout noir, 1991
  2. Le puits d'amour, 1992
  3. A nous la belle vie, 1994
- Je m'excuse, 1992, illustrations by Serge Bloch
- Ma vie de star, 1992, illustrations by Olivier Matouk
- Chipies et les Inventeurs, 1992, illustrations by Fabienne Teyssèdre
- Un phare dans le ciel, 1993
- Thomas Face-de-Rat et Amélie Mélasse, 1993, illustrations by Mette Ivers
- Souï-Manga, 1993, illustrations by Joëlle Jolivet
- L'enfant des ombres, 1994
- Trois-Pommes, 1994, illustrations by Catherine Rebeyrol Nous, les filles, 1995, illustrations by Éric Heliot
- Ma vengeance sera terrible, 1995, illustrations by Anaïs Vaugelade
- La marque du diable, 1996
- Mon loup, 1996, illustrations by Mette Ivers
- Derrière la porte, 1997
- La chose qui ne pouvait pas exister, 1997
- Ah, la famille !, 1997, illustrations Mette Ivers
- Un ange avec des baskets , 1998
- Williams et nous, 1998
- Vilaine fille, 1999
- Bon à rien, 1999, illustrations Catherine Rebeyrol
- Cela, 2000
- L'écolier assassin, 2000
- Joséphine a disparu, 2000, illustrations Edith
- Le Plus grand détective du monde, 2000, illustrations Jean-François Martin
- Le Dernier cadeau du Père Noël, 2000, with Marie-Aude Murail, illustrations Stéphane Jorisch
- La chambre du pendu, 2001
- Le Poisson dans le bocal, 2001, illustrations Isabelle Bonameau
- Au pied de l'Arc-en-ciel, 2001, illustrations Catharina Valckx
- Le petit cœur brisé, 2002
- Un sale moment à passer, 2002
- Drôle de voleur !, 2002, illustrations Isabelle Bonameau
- Golem, serial cowritten with Marie-Aude Murail and Lorris Murail.
  1. Magic Berber
  2. Joke
  3. Natacha
  4. Monsieur William
  5. Alias
- L'Esprit de la fôret, 2003
- Arthus et Pénélope
  1. Le mystère de la Ferté-des-Eaux, 2002
  2. Amour et trahison, 2003
  3. Bonne année ?, 2003
  4. Do you speak français ?, 2004
- Vive la révolution !, 2003, illustrations Frédéric Rébéna
- Jeu mortel, 2003
- Les Malheurs d'Hortense, 2003, illustrations Magali Bonniol
- Il était trois fois, 2003, illustrations by Denise and Claude Millet
- Jusqu'au bout de la peur, 2004
- Tango, 2004
- Pourquoi ?, 2005
- Histoires de fées, 2006, illustrations Alice Charbin
- Sorcier !
  1. Menteurs, charlatans et soudards, 2006
  2. Le Frélampier, 2006
  3. Le Premier Temps du Chaos, 2007
  4. L'Honorable et le Monarque, 2007
  5. L'Étoile, 2008
  6. Les Quatre Dragons, 2008
  7. Secrets et confiture, 2008
  8. La fin du Monde, 2009
- C'est l'aventure, collective, 2010
- Frissons
  1. La Prophétie de Venise, 2012
  2. L'Immortel, 2013
- Kinra girls (12 volumes), illustrations Anne Cresci

== Filmography ==
=== Cinema ===
- 1985: Escalier C directed by Jean-Charles Tacchella, (co-screenwriter and dialogue writer)
- 1988: La Maison de Jeanne directed by Magali Clément, (assistant screenwriter)
- 1988: La Septième dimension, directed by six co-directors, (co-screenwriter and assistant screenwriter)
- 1989: Les Mannequins d'osier directed by Francis de Gueltzl, (screenwriter and dialogue writer)
- 1993: Une journée pour rien by Serge Halsdorf, (screenwriter and dialogue writer)

=== Television ===
- 1993: Chambre froide, directed by Sylvain Madigan, (adaptation and dialogues)
- 1996: Un monde meilleur, directed by Laurent Dussaux, (screenwriter-assistant dialogue writer)
- 1997: La Vie en face, directed by Lisa del Bo, (screenwriter-dialogue writer)
- 1997: Un étrange héritage, directed by Laurent Dussaux, (screenwriter-assistant dialogue writer)

== Prizes and awards ==
- Prix du premier roman for Escalier C, 1983
- Prix George Sand for Escalier C, 1984
- Prix des Incorruptibles
- Tam-tam Je bouquine
- Prix du Polar
- Grand prix de l'Imaginaire
- Prix des Embouquineurs
- Prix de la SNCF for Pourquoi ?

She received twice a scholarship from the National Center for Letters for Un phare dans le ciel and for the whole of her work for youth.
