= Microtuner =

Device to test musical instrument tuning

A microtuner or microtonal tuner is an electronic device or software program designed to modify and test the tuning of musical instruments (in particular synthesizers) with microtonal precision, allowing for the design and construction of microtonal scales and just intonation scales, and for tuning intervals that may differ from those of common Western equal temperament. The term also indicates a high-precision mechanical tuning device found on some vintage Conn brand brass and reed instruments (mostly cornets and alto saxophones). These were first introduced with their 1918 catalog and manufactured until about 1954. Such devices were also offered with some vintage saxophones manufactured in Europe by Beaugnier, Dolnet, Hüller, Keilwerth and other famous makers in the same period.

== See also ==
- Electronic tuner – Device used to tune musical instruments
- Sonoclast Plastic Pitch MIDI Microtuner - Real-time interface for tuning multiple MIDI synths simultaneously.
- MIDI Tuning Standard – Specification of precise musical pitch
- Scala (program)
