= Beauty in the Beast =

1986 studio album by Wendy Carlos

Studio album by Wendy Carlos
- Released: 1986
- Genre: Classical; electronic; experimental
- Length: 57:41
- Label: Audion Records
- Producer: Wendy Carlos

Wendy Carlos chronology
Digital Moonscapes (1984)	Beauty in the Beast (1986)	Wendy Carlos: Secrets of Synthesis (1990)

Beauty in the Beast is a studio album from the American keyboardist and composer Wendy Carlos, released in 1986, on Audion Records, her first for a label other than Columbia Records since 1968. The album uses alternate musical tunings and scales, influenced by jazz and world music. On the back she includes a quote by Van Gogh: "I am always doing what I cannot do yet, in order to learn how to do it."

As the liner notes state, the entire album is synthesized, meaning that "All the music and sounds heard on this recording were directly digitally generated. This eliminates all the limitations of microphones, the weak link necessary in nearly all other digital recordings, including those that use 'sampling' technologies."

== Track listing ==
No.	Title	Musical content	Length
1.	"Incantation"	"tritone rich"	6:45
2.	"Beauty in the Beast"	Beta and Alpha scales	3:57
3.	"Poem for Bali"	Pelog and Slendro tunings	17:39
4.	"Just Imaginings"	Harmonic Scale with modulation	12:06
5.	"That's Just It"	Harmonic Scale, jazz	3:36
6.	"Yusae-Aisae" (pronounced "You say I say")	Harmonic Scale, "Hollywoodesque Mid-Eastern marketplace"	3:12
7.	"C'est Afrique"	Rhythm in Sub-Saharan Africa	6:13
8.	"A Woman's Song"	Bulgarian Sheperdess's "Izlel ye Delyo Haydutin" with tambura and dilruba, instead of Bulgarian bagpipes, appropriate raga tuning, western horns, crotales, and several hybrid timbres	4:10
Total length:			57:41

== Reviews ==
Dave Benson wrote:

It seems that for most users of synthesizers the extra freedom has not had much effect, in the sense that most music involving synthesizers is written using the equal tempered twelve tone scale. A notable exception is Wendy Carlos, who has composed a great deal of music for synthesizers using many different scales. [Benson] particularly recommend[s] Beauty in the Beast.

AllMusic noted that "The music on this album cuts through a lot of the conventions and restraints that were used as frameworks for previous releases: instrumentation, tonality, and scaling, to name just a few."
