= Digital Moonscapes =

Studio album by Wendy Carlos
- Released: 1984
- Genre: Classical
- Length: 55:38
- Label: East Side Digital
- Producer: Wendy Carlos

Wendy Carlos chronology
Tron (soundtrack) (1982)	Digital Moonscapes (1984)	Beauty in the Beast (1986)

Professional ratings
Review scores
Source	Rating
AllMusic	2.5/5 stars
The Encyclopedia of Popular Music	2/5 stars
The Rolling Stone Album Guide	3/5 stars

Digital Moonscapes (1984) is an album by Wendy Carlos. "Written for orchestra (or orchestra replica), it is inspired by several astronomical subjects." A symphony orchestra is simulated using Digital Synth's GDS (General Development System) and Synergy Digital Synthesizers (see: Crumar). These used additive and complex FM/PM modulation. She named her ensemble the LSI Philharmonic: "('Large Scale Integration' circuits, i.e., computer chips)". "This was the first digitally synthesized orchestra of any significance that a single composer could command."

But why do all this?...The goal ought to be providing the base on which to build new sounds with orchestral qualities that have not been heard before but are equally satisfying to the ear...look for the next steps using the experimental hybrid and imaginary sounds which have grown out of this work.

— Wendy Carlos

These efforts bear fruit in her later work Beauty in the Beast (1986) and Tales of Heaven and Hell (1998).

According to Curtis Roads, "Three compositions produced in the 1980s stand as good examples of compositional manipulation of analysis data: Mortuos Plango, Vivos Voco (1981) by Jonathan Harvey, Désintegrations (1983, Salabert Trajectoires) by Tristan Murail, and Digital Moonscapes (1985, CBS/Sony) by Wendy Carlos."

The album was Carlos' first album since completing the score for Tron, and it would be her penultimate solo release for CBS. It was re-released in 2000 on the now-defunct East Side Digital label with new cover art that Carlos said was rejected by CBS. She further stated that the artwork for the original CBS release was not available to them due to CBS owning the copyright on it. The title is now out of print, as is the majority of her catalog following the collapse of ESD.

== Critical reception ==
The music on the album is described as: "veer[ing] uncomfortably between murky electronic experimentalism and weedy pseudo-baroque," and as, "thoroughly tonal, Romantic-orchestra-inspired, electronic tone poems."

The New York Times praised the "inventively colorful, atmospheric suites," writing that Carlos shows, "fairly convincingly, that digital synthesizers can mimic orchestral timbres far more successfully than the old analogue machines could." The Rolling Stone Album Guide called the album "pleasant," but wrote that it "might now be filed under 'New Age'."

== Track listing ==
No.	Title	Length
1.	"Genesis"	7:10
2.	"Genesis"	4:31
3.	"I.C. (Intergalactic Communications)"	3:41
4.	"Luna"	8:20
5.	"Phobos And Deimos"	3:27
6.	"Ganymede"	4:24
7.	"Europa"	4:20
8.	"Io"	4:26
9.	"Callisto"	4:29
10.	"Rhea"	1:52
11.	"Titan"	3:45
12.	"Iapetus"	5:51
