= SDIF =

SDIF, "Sound Description Interchange Format" is a standard for the well-defined and extensible interchange of a variety of sound descriptions. SDIF consists of a fixed framework plus a large and extensible collection of spectral description types, including time-domain (analogous to regular audio file formats), Sinusoidal Models, other spectral models, and higher-level models. SDIF was jointly developed by IRCAM and CNMAT.
