= Chamadelle =

- Commune
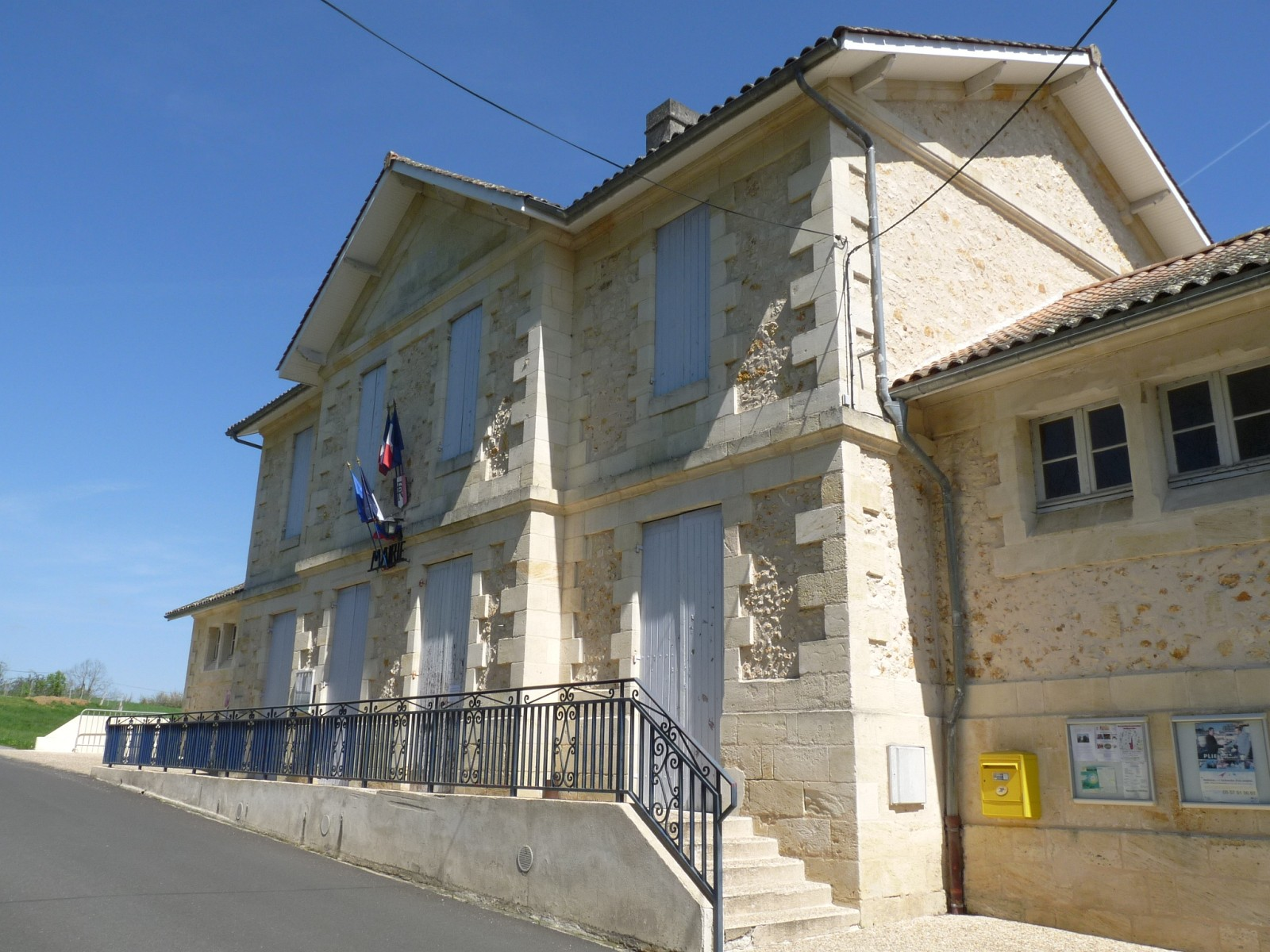
- The town hall in Chamadelle
- Location of Chamadelle
- Location within France Location within Nouvelle-Aquitaine
- Coordinates: 45°06′17″N 0°04′32″W
- Country: France
- Region: Nouvelle-Aquitaine
- Department: Gironde
- Arrondissement: Libourne
- Canton: Le Nord-Libournais
- Intercommunality: CA Libournais

Government
  - Mayor (2020–2026): Sophie Blancheton
- Area^{1}: 15.35 km^{2} (5.93 sq mi)
- Elevation: 70 m (230 ft)
- Highest elevation: 87 m (285 ft)
- Lowest elevation: 7 m (23 ft)
- Population (2023): 725
  - Density: 47.2/km^{2} (122/sq mi)
- Time zone: UTC+01:00 (CET)
  - Summer (DST): UTC+02:00 (CEST)
- INSEE/Postal code: 33124 /33230
- ^{1} French Land Register data, which excludes lakes, ponds, glaciers > 1 km^{2} (0.386 sq mi or 247 acres) and river estuaries.

Chamadelle (French pronunciation: [ʃamadɛl]) is a commune in the Gironde department in Nouvelle-Aquitaine in southwestern France.

== Population ==
Historical population
Year	Pop.	±% p.a.
1968	527	—
1975	513	−0.38%
1982	565	+1.39%
1990	562	−0.07%
1999	560	−0.04%
2007	644	+1.76%
2012	681	+1.12%
2017	733	+1.48%
2023	725	−0.18%
Source: INSEE

== See also ==
- Communes of the Gironde department
