= Marie-Aude Murail =

French children's writer (born 1954)

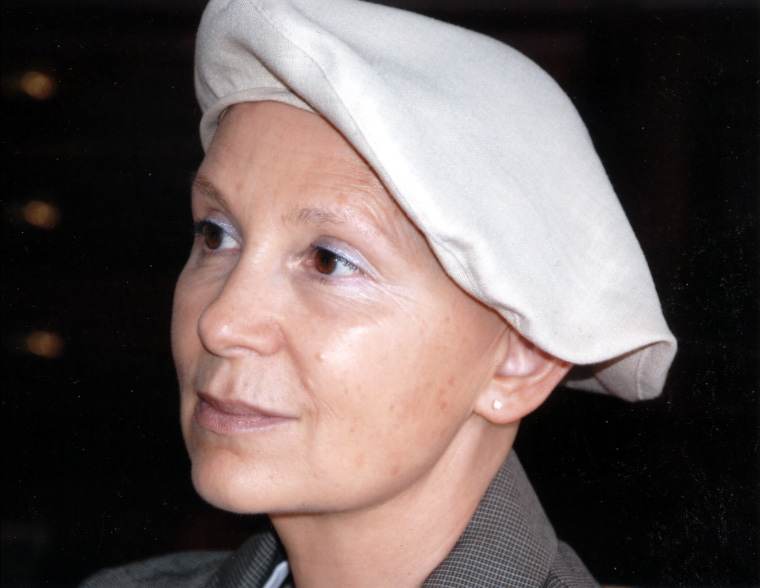
- Murail photographed at home by Claudie Rocard-Laperrousaz in June 2007
- Born: 6 May 1954 (age 72); Le Havre, France
- Education: Sorbonne University
- Occupation: Writer
- Spouse: Pierre-Michel Robert (1973–present)
- Children: 3
- Relatives: Elvire Murail (sister); Lorris Murail (brother); Tristan Murail (brother)

Marie-Aude Murail (born 6 May 1954) is a French writer. She is best known for her numerous children and teen novels that go over a wide range of subjects including blended families, self-identification, mental health and serious illnesses. Her books span first-grade reading to young adult fiction, and include slice of life drama and comedy, detective novels and thrillers, fantasy and historical novels.

Her father, Gerard Murail, is a poet and her mother, Marie-Thérèse Barrois, a journalist. One of her brothers and her younger sister also write: Lorris Murail and Elvire Murail, aka Moka. Her other older brother, Tristan Murail is a music composer.

In 1973, she married Pierre Robert, an INSEE bureaucrat, with whom she has three children, Benjamin (1977), Charles (1987) and Constance (1994).

== Biography ==
Murail was born in Le Havre in 1954 and has been writing since she was twelve years old.

She studied modern literature at the Sorbonne University in Paris and concluded it by working on a thesis dealing with how to adapt classical novels to make them readable for young kids. She earned her "stripes" at the Editions mondiales, where she published a hundred short stories in women's magazines (Intimité, Nous Deux) between 1980 and 1987. In the mid 1980s, her first two novels (for adults) were published by Swiss publisher Pierre-Marcel Favre: Passage (1985) and Voici Lou (1986).

Since her first story, "C'est mieux d'être bleu," published in 1985 in the Astrapi magazine, she has written over 80 books for children, most notably three series, "Emilien," "Nils Hazard" and "L'Espionne."

Most of her books were published by L'Ecole des Loisirs, Bayard and lately by Pocket.

The "Emilien" series

Murail writes about the adventures of Emilien Pardini, a boy aged fourteen at the beginning of the series, who lives alone with his mother Sylvie. The various books follow him throughout his teen years. Murail exploits all the dramatic and comical resources of a contemporary single-parent family and well as those of a teen's puberty and daily life.

- Baby-sitter blues (1989)
- Le Trésor de mon père (1989)
- Le Clocher d'Abgall (1989)
- Au bonheur des larmes (1990)
- Un séducteur né (1991)
- Sans sucre, merci (1992)
- Nos amours ne vont pas si mal (1993)

The series was republished in the Neuf collection (2006).

The Nils Hazard series

Alongside the "Emiliens," Murail initiates an adventure series in which Nils Hazard, an eccentric etruscologist and teacher at the Sorbonne University, has to solve murders and strange investigations cases. He is assisted by an ex-student of his, Catherine Roque who becomes his secretary and girlfriend during the series of books.

- Dinky Rouge Sang (1991)
- L'assassin est au collège (1992)
- La dame qui tue (1993)
- Tête à rap (1994)
- Scénario catastrophe (1995)
- Qui veut la peau de Maori Cannell? (1997)
- Rendez-vous avec M. X (1998)

Fantasy

Murail widens the range of her production, exploring a slightly fantastic daily life first in "Ma vie a changé" (1997), where a librarian comes to struggling with a domestic elf. Her style evolves towards definitely delirious when this daily life mixes with vampires ("Amour, vampire et loup-garou," 1998) or aliens ("Tom Lorient," 1998). In 2002, teenagers craving for video games inspired "Golem," where virtual reality bursts into the real world. Golem was also a three-person writing experience which she intended with her siblings. Brother and sisters expressed, each in their own way, how they felt about it and describe it on Marie-Aude Murail's website. Marie-Aude led another writing project with her brother Lorris during the following year ("L'expérienceur," 2003).

- Ma vie a changé (1997)
- Amour, vampire et loup-garou (1998)
- Tom Lorient (1999)
- L'expérienceur (written with Lorris Murail) (2003)
- Golem (written with Elvire and Lorris Murail) (2002)

"Golem" begins when Majid Badach, a young boy who lives in Hummingbird Tower on the Moreland estate, wins a computer from Priceshrinkers, apparently a trustworthy company. One of his teachers, Hugh Mullins, helps him set it up. Only one day, while they are chatting on the Internet, a video game sets in and runs on its own: Golem. Majid's life, along with his teacher's, turn on a dime ...

History as a source of stories

After "Jésus, comme un roman ..." (1997), Murail wrote a six-episode series published by Je Bouquine during the two last months of the second millennium. Murail plunges her readers into six different periods of history ("D'amour et de sang," 1999). She then pays tribute to her favorite novelist and « heavenly father » ("Charles Dickens," 2005), and takes her readers back to 19th-century England with the autobiography of a Victorian illustrator, inspired by the life of Beatrix Potter ("Miss Charity," 2008).

- Jésus, comme un roman ...(1997)
- D'amour et de sang (1999)
- Charles Dickens (2006)
- Miss Charity (2008)

A work that keeps diversifying

Even though her readers, who have grown up in twenty years, often ask her about Emilien, Martine-Marie or Nils, Murail now changes time and space with each novel. Although the teen age and its tricks are still at the heart of her books, family, social and political considerations now find their way into her work. She now uses the strength of experience and current events, whether the topic is undocumented children and the necessarily enshrined school system ("Vive la République!," 2005), or a company and a kindergarten being submitted to the same imperatives of « globalisation » and « working more » ("Papa et maman sont dans un bateau," spring 2009), yet never being short of humor. Despite the seriousness of the issues in question, her « dramatic pedagogy of life » is neither bleak nor heavy : Murail thinks a fictional work intended for children has no need of sad endings. She sincerely thinks that it would be malpractice. This might be the writer's only ethical principle, driven by her characters' lives and the dynamics they imprint on her writing. Thus « life, Life » are Miss Charity's very last words.

- Oh Boy! (2000)
- Simple (2004)
- Maïté Coiffure (2004)
- La fille du docteur Baudoin (2006)
- Vive la République ! (2006)
- Papa et maman sont dans un bateau (spring 2009)

For her first readers

Her first novel for young readers is a tale parody, published by Gallimard :

- Mystère (1987)

Afterwards, she wrote eleven « Mouche » and two « Neuf », published by L'Ecole des Loisirs :

- Le Chien des Mers (1988)
- Le hollandais sans peine (1989)
- Les secrets véritables (1990)
- Mon bébé à 210 francs (1990)
- Un dimanche chez les dinosaures (1991)
- Le changelin (1994)
- Qui a peur de madame Lacriz ? (1996)
- Souï Manga (written with Elvire Murail) (1999)
- Peau-de-rousse (1999)
- Patte-blanche (2005)
- 22 ! (2008)
- MythO (2001)
- Nonpareil (2007)

In addition to five short stories published by Astrapi, Murail wrote over twenty illustrated stories in monthly magazine J'aime Lire (“from 7 years-old on”), most of which were republished as books by Bayard.

- Graine de monstre (1991)
- L'oncle Giorgio (1990)
- Le visiteur de minuit (1993)
- Les secrets du docteur Magicus (1993)
- L'or des mages (1996)
- Noël à tous les étages (2001)
- Il était trois fois (written with Elvire Murail) (2008)

The L'espionne series, illustrated by Frédéric Joos, published by Bayard.

- L'espionne fonde son club (2001)
- L'espionne (2001)
- L'espionne joue à l'espion (2001)
- L'espionne sauve la planète (2003)
- L'espionne arrête d'espionner (2003)
- L'espionne allume son robot (2003
- L'espionne s'énerve (2003)
- L'espionne se méfie (2004)
- L'espionne veut la vérité (2004)
- L'espionne cartonne (2005)
- L'espionne déclone (2006)
- L'espionne est occupée (2007)

Je Bouquine, a magazine edited by the same publisher, often publishes her stories, longer and intended for older readers (10–15 years old).

- Le défi de Serge T. (1993)
- Moi, le zoulou (1994)
- Devenez populaire en cinq leçons (1995)
- La peur de ma vie (2000)
- Le gène zinzin (2002)
- Jeu dangereux (2003)
- Maïté Coiffure (2004) (also published as a book by L'école des loisirs)
- Le baron de Nonpareil (2006)

For those learning to read

Murail also takes an interest in teaching how to read. Teamed up during five years with primary teacher Christine Thiéblemont from Orléans, then joined by educational counselor Patricia Bucheton, she wrote a reading course book for first graders, the "Bulle" textbook, published by Bordas. Murail revealed her motives and her contribution to this common experience as a children's writer in an interview that can be found on the website of La Charte des auteurs et illustrateurs jeunesse, an association she is involved in. The Bulle course book is characterized by the role given to children's literature and reading aloud in the development of infantile imagination. Murail discusses this in a video.

- Bulle méthode de lecture pour le CP - cycle 2 (2008).

Being a children's writer

Murail has not stopped thinking, since she wrote her literature thesis, about the purpose of her work. Thereupon she wrote articles, conferences and even books. She wrote a first one in 1993, in which she drew the results of her encounters with her readership, and another one ten years later, rather dedicated to the convictions that made her, as she had already written in the conclusion of her thesis, “remain in childhood”. From the viewpoint that has been hers since she was 25, she has nonetheless kept her readership growing, her readers staying faithful as they grow up.

- Continue la lecture, on n'aime pas la récré.. (1993)
- Auteur jeunesse - Comment le suis-je devenue, pourquoi le suis-je restée (2003)

== A recognized work ==
Oh, Boy! is her most sold and translated book. It was adapted for television by director Thierry Binisti, produced by K'ien Productions. Most of her books received various prizes, in France and abroad, since they were exported, in Europe and beyond, and translated to about fifteen languages. Simple, Tobias Scheffel's German translation of Simple, received the Deutscher Jugendliteraturpreis, bestowed by a jury of German teenagers during the Frankfurt Book Fair. The French version had already received the Prix des lycéens allemands during the Leipzig book fair in 2006.

Nowadays, Murail sells about 200,000 books each year in France.

In 2004, Murail was granted the distinction of Chevalier de la Légion d'honneur, in recognition of her whole career.

In 2022, Murail won the Hans Christian Andersen Award.

== Scenarios ==
- Screen writer for Baby-sitter Blues, a television film directed by par Williams Crépin and broadcast on 27 December 1997 on France 3.
- Co-screen writer for Malabar Princess, directed by Gilles Legrand (2004).
