= Gondwana (Murail) =

Musical composition by Tristan Murail

Gondwana (1980) is a defining musical composition of spectral music for large orchestra composed by Tristan Murail using simulated synthesis to create a harmonic interpolation between an orchestrally synthesized chord derived from a simulated bell sound (inharmonic) and a chord derived from a trombone sound (harmonic). This process is meant to evoke the shifting of continents and thus the piece is named after the former supercontinent Gondwana.

The piece uses interpolation to make a smooth transformation on all musical parameters including spectral profile, envelope, and instrumental attacks. The bell sounds were created through a Frequency Modulation (FM) synthesis with a single modulator affecting five carriers to create five different harmonies, these being connected by interpolated chords. The components of the trombone's frequency spectrum was derived through a Fourier transform.

The piece's long quiet or silent moments are shaped in "long, seamlessly evolving paragraphs" evoking the geological processes which created the continent. The first opening slowly transforms a chord before turning to trills. The opening chord has been compared to the work of Messiaen. The piece, "incorporates a substantial passage directly modelled upon," Sibelius's Lemminkäinen in Tuonela from the Four Lemminkäinen Legends op.22 (1896).
