= Jean-Claude Touche =

French musician, organist and composer

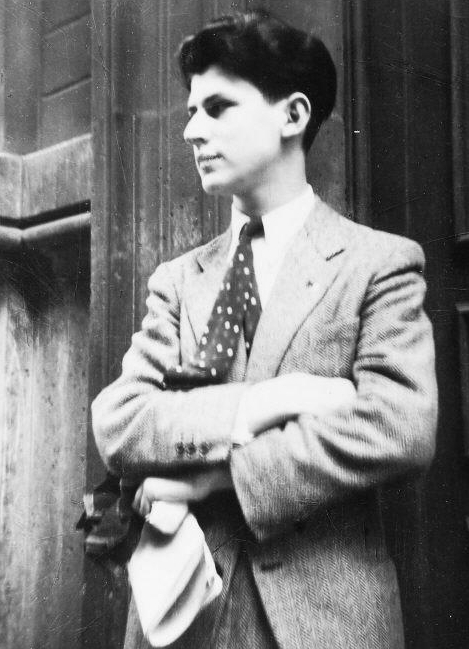
- Jean-Claude Touche
- Born: 7 August 1926; Paris, France
- Died: 29 August 1944 (aged 18); Paris, France
- Education: Conservatoire de Paris
- Occupations: Classical organist; Composer

Jean-Claude Touche (7 August 1926 – 29 August 1944) was a French musician, organist and composer.

== Biography ==
Jean-Claude Touche was born in Paris. His father, Firmin Touche (Avignon, 25 juillet 1875-1957), was concertmaster of the Concerts Colonne and academic at the Conservatoire de Paris.

In 1941, Jean-Claude entered the Conservatoire de Paris where Henri Rabaud had just given way to Claude Delvincourt. He attended the classes of Maurice Duruflé and Marcel Dupré. He won a first prize in organ in 1944, three months before his death.

During his very short existence, he composed some quality works: Thème et variations sur Veni creator and a Pastorale pour orgue.

"He had the virtuoso's gifts, clarity, flames. His executions were at the same time thoughtful and alive. He loved improvisation and shared with his listeners his aspirations and religious ecstasy." Thus spoke Marcel Dupré about his student.

In Le Figaro dated 12 August 1999, Hélène de Felice wrote: "All those who knew Jean-Claude Touche have an extraordinary memory of him. He possessed the charisma that beauty brings to the intelligence, the beauty of the mind and the beauty of the heart. He radiated a real faith, that which leads to total devotion..."

Jean-Claude Touche was a promising French musician and conductor whose career was cut short: while trying to pick up a wounded person lying on a stretcher in the rue de Rivoli, at the corner of the place de la Concorde, a German bullet fatally struck this eighteen-year-old on August 25, 1944, during the battles for the Liberation of Paris. He died on August 29, 1944, after a desperate operation. Touche is buried in the Père-Lachaise Cemetery (44th division).
