= Tristan Murail =

French composer (born 1947)

Tristan Murail (born 11 March 1947) is a French composer associated with the "spectral" technique of composition. Among his compositions is the large orchestral work Gondwana.

== Early life and studies ==
Murail was born in Le Havre, France. His father, Gérard Murail, is a poet and his mother, Marie-Thérèse Barrois, a journalist. One of his brothers, Lorris Murail, and his younger sister Elvire Murail, a.k.a. Moka, are also writers, and his younger sister Marie-Aude Murail is a French children's writer.

First studying political science and economics, he also began playing the Ondes Martenot. This led to contact with Jeanne Loriod and thence to her brother-in-law Olivier Messiaen, with whom he subsequently studied composition at the Paris Conservatory from 1967 to 1972. He taught computer music and composition at IRCAM in Paris from 1991 to 1997. While there, he assisted in the development of Patchwork composition software. In 1973 he was a founding member of the Ensemble l'Itinéraire. From 1997 until 2010, he was a professor of composition at Columbia University in New York City.

== Music ==
Murail is associated with the "spectral" technique of composition, which involves the use of the fundamental properties of sound as a basis for harmony, as well as the use of spectral analysis, FM, RM, and AM synthesis as a method of deriving polyphony.

Major pieces by Murail include large orchestral pieces such as Gondwana, Time and Again and, more recently, Serendib and L'Esprit des dunes. Other pieces include his Désintégrations for 17 instruments and tape, Mémoire/Erosion for French horn and nine instruments Ethers for flute and ensemble, Winter Fragments for flute, clarinet, piano, violin, cello and electronics as well as Vampyr! for electric guitar.

Murail also composed a set of solo pieces for various instruments in his cycle Random Access Memory, of which the sixth, Vampyr!, is a rare classical piece for electric guitar. In addition to deriving much of the musical material from the harmonic series over a low E—typically the lowest note on the instrument— the composer also references the timbre and performance style of guitarists in the rock tradition, citing Carlos Santana and Eric Clapton as examples in the instructions to the score.

Among Murail's awards are the Prix de Rome (presented by the French Académie des beaux-arts in 1971), the Grand Prix du Disque (1990), the Grand Prix du Président de la République, Académie Charles Cros (1992) and the Wihuri Sibelius Prize (2023).

Murail's works are published by Éditions Transatlantiques and Éditions Henry Lemoine. His music has been recorded on the Una Corda, Metier, Adés, and MFA-Radio France labels.

== Works ==
=== Orchestral ===
- 1970, Altitude 8000, for orchestra
- 1972, Au-delà du mur du son, for large orchestra
- 1973, La dérive des continents, for viola and string orchestra
- 1973, Cosmos privé, for orchestra
- 1975, Sables, for orchestra
- 1979, Les courants de l'espace, for ondes Martenot and small orchestra
- 1980, Gondwana, for orchestra
- 1985, Sillages, for orchestra
- 1985, Time and again, for orchestra
- 1991, La dynamique des fluides, for orchestra
- 1996, Le partage des eaux, for large orchestra
- 2004, Terre d'ombre, for large orchestra and electronic sounds
- 2007, Contes cruels, for 2 electric guitars and orchestra
- 2013, Reflections / Reflets I - Spleen
- 2013, Reflections / Reflets II - High Voltage / Haute tension
- 2017, Reflections / Reflets III - Vents et marées / Tidal winds

=== Concertante ===
- 2012, Le Désenchantement du monde, piano concerto
- 2019, De Pays et d'Hommes Étranges, cello concerto
- 2021, L'Oeil du cyclone, piano concerto

=== Ensemble ===
- 1969, Couleur de mer, for 15 instruments
- 1972, L'Attente, for 7 instruments
- 1976, Mémoire/Erosion, for horn and ensemble
- 1978, Ethers, for 6 instruments
- 1978, Treize couleurs du soleil couchant, for ensemble
- 1982, Désintégrations, for 17 instruments and electronic sounds
- 1990, Allégories, for 6 instruments and electronic sounds
- 1992, Serendib, for 22 musicians
- 1993, La Barque mystique for ensemble
- 1994, L'Esprit des dunes, for ensemble
- 1996, Bois flotté, for piano, trombone, string trio, synthetic sounds and synthesized sounds
- 2000, Winter Fragments, for flute, clarinet, piano, violin, cello, MIDI keyboard and computer
- 2001, Le Lac, for ensemble
- 2006, Légendes urbaines for 22 instruments
- 2006, Seven Lakes Drive, from «Portulan», for flute, clarinet, horn, piano, violin and cello
- 2008, Liber fulguralis, for ensemble, electronics and video
- 2011, La Chambre des cartes, from «Portulan», for flute, clarinet, horn, piano, percussions, violin, viola and cello
- 2011, Lachrymae, for alto flute and string quintet
- 2011, Dernières nouvelles du vent d'ouest, from «Portulan», for viola, horn, piano and percussion
- 2012, The Bronze Age, for flute, clarinet, trombone, violin, cello and piano
- 2014, Un Sogno, for ensemble and electronics
- 2017, Near Death Experience d'après L'Ile des morts d'Arnold Böcklin, for ensemble and video

=== Chamber ===
- 1970, Où tremblent les contours, for 2 violas
- 1973, Les Nuages de Magellan, for 2 ondes Martenot, electric guitar and percussions
- 1974, Transsahara express, for bassoon and piano
- 1986, Atlantys, for 2 DX7 Yamaha synthesizers, from Random Access Memory
- 1988, Vues aériennes, for horn, violin, cello and piano
- 1990, Le fou à pattes bleues, for flute and piano
- 1993, La barque mystique, for five instruments
- 1998, Feuilles à travers les cloches, from «Portulan», for flute, violin, cello and piano
- 2006, Les Ruines circulaires, from «Portulan», for clarinet and violin
- 2008, Garrigue, from «Portulan», for bass flute, viola, cello and percussions
- 2015, Travel Notes, for 2 pianos and 2 percussions
- 2016, Sogni, ombre et fumi, for string quartet
- 2018, Stalag VIIIA, for violin, clarinet, cello and piano
- 2018, Une lettre de Vincent, for flute and cello
- 2019, Kinderszenen by Robert Schumann, rereading for flute, cello and piano

=== Solo instrument ===
- 1967, Comme un Oeil Suspendu et Poli par le Songe…, for piano
- 1972, Estuaire, 2 pieces for piano
- 1976, C'est un jardin secret, ma sœur, ma fiancée, une fontaine close, une source scellée for viola solo
- 1977, Tellur, for guitar
- 1977, Territoires de l'oubli, for piano
- 1984, Vampyr!, for electric guitar, from Random Access Memory
- 1992, Attracteurs étranges, for cello
- 1992, Cloches d’adieu, et un sourire... in memoriam Olivier Messiaen, for piano
- 1993, La Mandragore, for piano
- 1995, Unanswered questions, for flute
- 2002, Les travaux et les jours, for piano
- 2018, Cailloux dans l'eau, for piano
- 2019, Le Rossignol en amour, for piano

=== Vocal ===
- 1995, ...amaris et dulcibus aquis..., for chorus and electronic sounds
- 2010, Les sept Paroles, for orchestra, chorus and electronics
- 2016, La Vallée close, sur des sonnets de Pétrarque

== Specialty studies ==
- Humbertclaude Éric (1999), La Transcription dans Boulez et Murail: de l’oreille à l’éveil, Harmattan, ISBN 2-7384-8042-X
