= Ernst von Siemens Music Prize =

German music award

- Awarded for: "personalities whose compositions, interpretations, writings, or teaching served music and promoted the love of music"
- Sponsored by: Ernst von Siemens Music Foundation, Zug, Switzerland
- Location: Munich
- Country: Germany
- Presented by: Bayerische Akademie der Schönen Künste and Ernst von Siemens Music Foundation
- Reward: €250,000 (main prize)
- Established: 1972
- First award: 1974
- Website: www.evs-musikstiftung.ch/en

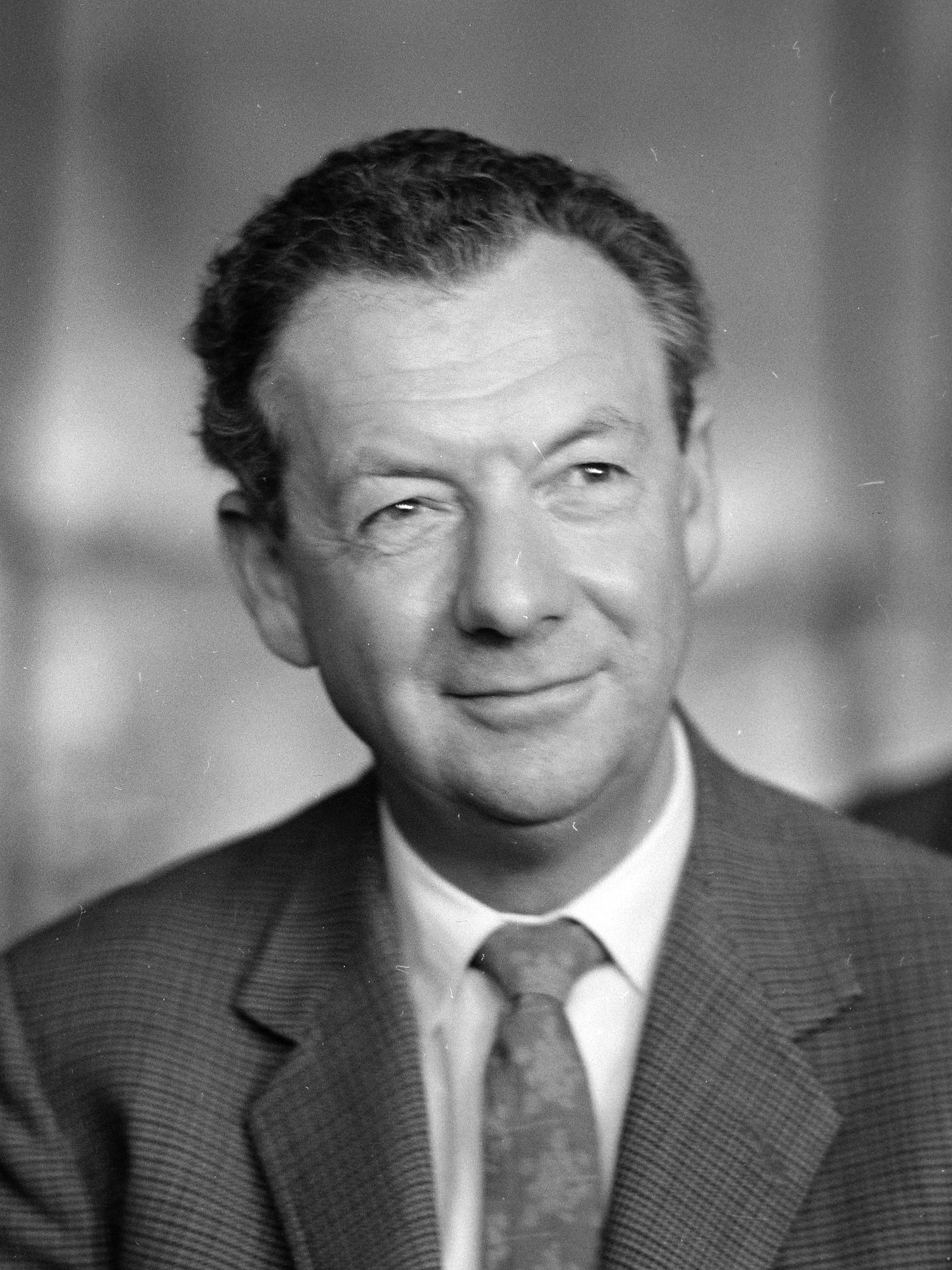
English composer Benjamin Britten was the first winner of the Ernst von Siemens Music Prize in 1974.

The Ernst von Siemens Music Prize (short: Siemens Music Prize, German: Ernst von Siemens Musikpreis) is an annual music prize given by the Bayerische Akademie der Schönen Künste (Bavarian Academy of Fine Arts) on behalf of the Ernst von Siemens Musikstiftung (Ernst von Siemens Music Foundation), established in 1972. The foundation was established by Ernst von Siemens (1903–1990) and promotes contemporary music. The prize honors a composer, performer, or musicologist who has made a distinguished contribution to the world of music. In addition to the main prize, other prizes are also given. The total prize money given is currently €3.5 million, with the winner of the main prize receiving €250,000. The prize is sometimes known as "the Nobel Prize of music".

Smaller awards are called "Förderpreis" (encouragement award). "Komponisten-Förderpreise" ("Composer Prizes") are given to young composers for one of their works. "Förderprojekte" ("Grant-in-Aid Projects") support music festivals, concerts, musical institutions, and young musicians.

== Main prize winners ==
Winners of the main prize were:

- 1974 – Benjamin Britten
- 1975 – Olivier Messiaen
- 1976 – Mstislav Rostropovich
- 1977 – Herbert von Karajan
- 1978 – Rudolf Serkin
- 1979 – Pierre Boulez
- 1980 – Dietrich Fischer-Dieskau
- 1981 – Elliott Carter
- 1982 – Gidon Kremer
- 1983 – Witold Lutosławski
- 1984 – Yehudi Menuhin
- 1985 – Andrés Segovia
- 1986 – Karlheinz Stockhausen
- 1987 – Leonard Bernstein
- 1988 – Peter Schreier
- 1989 – Luciano Berio
- 1990 – Hans Werner Henze
- 1991 – Heinz Holliger
- 1992 – H. C. Robbins Landon
- 1993 – György Ligeti
- 1994 – Claudio Abbado
- 1995 – Sir Harrison Birtwistle
- 1996 – Maurizio Pollini
- 1997 – Helmut Lachenmann
- 1998 – György Kurtág
- 1999 – Arditti Quartet
- 2000 – Mauricio Kagel
- 2001 – Reinhold Brinkmann
- 2002 – Nikolaus Harnoncourt
- 2003 – Wolfgang Rihm
- 2004 – Alfred Brendel
- 2005 – Henri Dutilleux
- 2006 – Daniel Barenboim
- 2007 – Brian Ferneyhough
- 2008 – Anne-Sophie Mutter
- 2009 – Klaus Huber
- 2010 – Michael Gielen
- 2011 – Aribert Reimann
- 2012 – Friedrich Cerha
- 2013 – Mariss Jansons
- 2014 – Peter Gülke
- 2015 – Christoph Eschenbach
- 2016 – Per Nørgård
- 2017 – Pierre-Laurent Aimard
- 2018 – Beat Furrer
- 2019 – Rebecca Saunders
- 2020 – Tabea Zimmermann
- 2021 – Georges Aperghis
- 2022 – Olga Neuwirth
- 2023 – Sir George Benjamin
- 2024 – Unsuk Chin
- 2025 – Sir Simon Rattle
- 2026 – Jordi Savall

== Composer Prize winners ==
Förderpreis winners were:

- 1990 – Michael Jarrell and George Lopez
- 1991 – Herbert Willi
- 1992 – Beat Furrer and Benedict Mason
- 1993 – Sylvia Fomina and Param Vir
- 1994 – Hans-Jürgen von Bose, Marc-André Dalbavie and Luca Francesconi
- 1995 – Gerd Kühr and Philippe Hurel
- 1996 – Volker Nickel and Rebecca Saunders
- 1997 – Moritz Eggert and Mauricio Sotelo
- 1998 – Antoine Bonnet and Claus-Steffen Mahnkopf
- 1999 – Thomas Adès and Olga Neuwirth
- 2000 – Hanspeter Kyburz, Augusta Read Thomas and Andrea Lorenzo Scartazzini
- 2001 – Isabel Mundry, André Werner and José María Sánchez-Verdú
- 2002 – Mark Andre, Jan Müller-Wieland and Charlotte Seither
- 2003 – Chaya Czernowin, Christian Jost and Jörg Widmann
- 2004 – Fabien Lévy, Johannes Maria Staud and Enno Poppe
- 2005 – Sebastian Claren, Philipp Maintz and Michel van der Aa
- 2006 – Jens Joneleit, Alexander Muno and Athanasia Tzanou
- 2007 – Vykintas Baltakas and Markus Hechtle
- 2008 – Dieter Ammann, Márton Illés and Wolfram Schurig
- 2009 – Francesco Filidei, Miroslav Srnka and Lin Yang
- 2010 – Pierluigi Billone, Arnulf Herrmann, Oliver Schneller
- 2011 – Steven Daverson, Hèctor Parra, Hans Thomalla
- 2012 – Luke Bedford, Zeynep Gedizlioğlu, Ulrich Alexander Kreppein
- 2013 – David Philip Hefti, Samy Moussa, Marko Nikodijevic
- 2014 – Simone Movio, Brigitta Muntendorf, Luis Codera Puzo
- 2015 – Birke J. Bertelsmeier, Mark Barden, Christian Mason
- 2016 – Milica Djordjevic, David Hudry, Gordon Kampe
- 2017 – Michael Pelzel, Simon Steen-Andersen, Lisa Streich
- 2018 – Clara Iannotta, Timothy McCormack, Oriol Saladrigues
- 2019 – Annesley Black, Ann Cleare, Mithatcan Öcal
- 2020 – Catherine Lamb, Francesca Verunelli, Samir Amarouch
- 2021 – Malte Giesen, Mirela Ivičević, Yair Klartag
- 2022 – Benjamin Attahir, Naomi Pinnock, Mikel Urquiza
- 2023 – Sara Glojnarić, Alex Paxton, Eric Wubbels
- 2024 – Yiqing Zhu, Daniele Ghisi, Bára Gísladóttir
- 2025 – Ashkan Behzadi, Bastien David, Kristine Tjøgersen
- 2026 – Bethan Morgan-Williams, Hovik Sardaryan and Kitty Xiao
