= Hindemith Prize =

Paul Hindemith Prize
- Awarded for: "outstanding contemporary composers"
- Sponsored by: Hindemith Foundation in Blonay (Switzerland), the Walter and Käthe Busche Foundation, the Rudolf and Erika Koch Foundation, the Gerhard Trede Foundation, the Franz Wirth Memorial Trust and the Cultural Office of the Free and Hanseatic City of Hamburg
- Location: Schleswig-Holstein
- Country: Germany
- Presented by: Schleswig-Holstein Music Festival
- Rewards: €20,000, Certificate, Emblem, Work release
- First award: 1990
- Website: www.hindemith.info/en/foundation

The international Paul Hindemith Prize promotes outstanding contemporary composers within the framework of the Schleswig-Holstein Music Festival (SHMF). The award commemorates the musical pedagogy of Paul Hindemith, who wrote the composition Plöner Musiktag in 1932 on behalf of the Staatliche Bildungsanstalt Plön. The music prize is endowed with €20,000 and goes together with a composition commission. The prize is presented annually by the Hindemith Foundation, the Walter and Käthe Busche Foundation, the Rudolf and Erika Koch Foundation, the Gerhard Trede Foundation, the Franz Wirth Memorial Trust and the Cultural Office of the Free and Hanseatic City of Hamburg since 1990. From 2010 to 2013, the winner was found by a composition competition. The work of the prize winner is to be premiered within the frame of the Schleswig-Holstein Music Festival.

== Prize Winners ==
- 1990 Wilhelm Killmayer
- 1991 Ensemble "Assoziation für moderne Musik"
- 1992 Wolfgang von Schweinitz
- 1993 Jan Müller-Wieland
- 1994 Babette Koblenz
- 1995 Caspar Johannes Walter
- 1996 Wolfram Schurig
- 1997 Helmut Oehring
- 1998 String Thing (string quartet)
- 1999 Olga Neuwirth
- 2000 Matthias Pintscher
- 2001 Thomas Adès
- 2002 Jörg Widmann
- 2003 Rebecca Saunders
- 2004 Jörn Arnecke
- 2005 Lera Auerbach
- 2006 Michel van der Aa
- 2007 Dai Fujikura
- 2008 Márton Illés
- 2009 Johannes Maria Staud
- 2010 Sascha Lino Lemke
- 2011 Markus Lehmann-Horn
- 2012 Li Bo
- 2013 Maximilian Schnaus
- 2014 Bernd Richard Deutsch
- 2015 David Philip Hefti
- 2016 Anna Clyne
- 2017 Samy Moussa
- 2018 Clara Iannotta
- 2019 Aigerim Seilova
- 2020 Stefan Johannes Hanke
- 2021 Mithatcan Öcal
- 2022 Hannah Kendall
- 2023 Alex Paxton
- 2024 Lisa Streich
- 2025 Benjamin Scheuer
- 2026 Birke J. Bertelsmeier
