= Schneider-Schott Music Prize =

- Awarded for: "An outstanding composer, performing artist, or music ensemble in classical music — with emphasis, but not mandatory, on contemporary music"
- Sponsored by: Heinz Schneider-Schott Foundation
- Location: Mainz
- Country: Germany
- Reward: €15,000
- First award: 1986
- Website: www.mainz.de/kultur-und-wissenschaft/kulturelle-preise-stipendien/schneider-schott-musikpreis.php

The Schneider-Schott Music Prize is a cash award bestowed to an outstanding composer, performing artist, or music ensemble in classical music—with emphasis, but not mandatory, on contemporary music. From 1986 to 2006, the prize was awarded annually, and thereafter, biennially. The prize is alternately given to a composer and an interpreter. The award ceremony is traditionally associated with a concert by the award winner.

== Winners ==
- 1986: Detlev Müller-Siemens and Wolfgang von Schweinitz
- 1987: Ensemble Modern
- 1988: Hans-Jürgen von Bose
- 1989: Herbert Henck and Walter Zimmermann
- 1990: Adriana Hölszky
- 1991: Gruppe Neue Musik Hanns Eisler
- 1992: Ulrich Stranz
- 1993: Steffen Schleiermacher and Ensemble Avantgarde
- 1994: Jörg Birkenkötter and Hanspeter Kyburz
- 1995: ensemble recherche
- 1996: Isabel Mundry and Moritz Eggert
- 1997: Nomos-Quartett
- 1998: Helmut Oehring
- 1999: Ensemble 13
- 2000: Michael Riessler and Mike Svoboda
- 2001: Babette Koblenz
- 2002: Jörg Widmann
- 2003: Salome Kammer and Thomas E. Bauer
- 2004: Neue Vocalsolisten Stuttgart
- 2005: Enno Poppe
- 2006: Peter Schöne
- 2008: Márton Illés
- 2010: Anna Prohaska
- 2012: Birke J. Bertelsmeier
- 2014: Carolin Widmann
- 2016: Gordon Kampe
- 2018: Dominik Susteck
- 2020: Benjamin Scheuer
- 2024: Ensemble Resonanz

== Candidate criteria and selection ==
Candidates should meet criteria of financial need. The winner is selected by an independent five-person jury of music experts.

=== Jury 2016 and 2018 ===
- Wolfgang Rathert (Head of Jury, LMU Munich)
- Achim Heidenreich (ZKM Center for Art and Media Karlsruhe)
- Wolfgang Rihm (Composer, Karlsruhe)
- Yvonne Stern-Campo (Schott Music Mainz)
- Lars Vogt (Pianist, Berlin)

== Prize founder and benefactor ==
The €15,000 award is funded by an endowment established by Heinz Schneider-Schott (1906–1988) and his wife. In 1952, Schneider-Schott, a son-in-law of Ludwig Strecker, became a director of the London-based music publishing firm, Schott and Co., which in 1980, reunited with Schott Music GmbH & Co. KG, in Mainz, which in 2006 was renamed Schott Music Limited.
