= Salome Kammer =

German actress, singer and cellist

Salome Kammer (born 17 January 1959) is a German actress, singer and cellist.

== Professional career ==
Born in Nidda, Hesse, Kammer was the fourth of six children. Her father was a Protestant pastor. Although born in Nidda, she grew up in Ober-Mockstadt, before her family moved to Frankfurt when she was eight.

Kammer studied at the Folkwang Hochschule from 1977 to 1984, cello with Maria Kliegel and Janos Starker. She was a member of the Heidelberg theater from 1983. In 1988 she played the role of Clarissa Lichtblau in the film Die Zweite Heimat, its sequel, Heimat 3, and the complementary Fragments – The Women (Fragmente – die Frauen), by Edgar Reitz.

Married to Reitz, she lives in Munich and is a noted performer of contemporary classical music.

In 2008 she recorded as Salomix-Max as a tribute to soprano Cathy Berberian, music of Cole Porter, Luciano Berio, Wolfgang Amadeus Mozart, Johann Valentin Görner, Carola Bauckholt, Tarquinio Merula, Alban Berg, Harold Arlen, Rudi Spring, Kurt Weill, Helmut Oehring and Nikolai Rimsky-Korsakov. In 2009 she appeared in songs and Chansons of the 1920s to 1940s, accompanied by Spring, at the Rheingau Musik Festival. In 2011 she appeared at the festival in the Komponistenporträt of Hans Zender in his denn wiederkommen (Hölderlin lesen III) and Mnemosyne (Hölderlin lesen IV) with the Athena Quartet.

She is a voice teacher for contemporary classical music at the University of Music and Theatre Munich. Since 2024, Kammer has been director for the music department of the Bayerische Akademie der Schönen Künste.

== Awards ==
- 2003: Schneider-Schott Music Prize, with Thomas E. Bauer
- 2015: Schwabing Art Prize
- 2024: Musikpreis der Landeshauptstadt München

== Premieres of musical stage works ==
- William Osborne: Beeb & Bab, Munich 1995
- Helmut Oehring: Dokumentaroper, Witten 1995
- Eric Ona: Beware of the Dog, Stuttgart 1996
- Helmut Oehring: Das D'Amato-System, Munich 1996
- Carola Bauckholt: Es wird sich zeigen, Berlin 1999
- Mauricio Sotelo: De Amore, Munich 1999
- Jörg Widmann: Befreiung aus dem Paradies, Hannover 2000
- Helmut Oehring, Iris ter Schiphorst: Effi Briest, Bonn 2001
- Jörg Widmann: Das Gesicht im Spiegel (role: Patricia), Munich 2003
- Isabel Mundry: Ein Atemzug – Die Odyssee (role: Penelope), Berlin 2005
- Bernhard Lang: I Hate Mozart (role: Franziska), Vienna 2006
- Alexandra Holtsch: Barcode for 2 turntable players, baritone, soprano, and actors, Munich 2007
- Georges Aperghis: Zeugen, Witten 2007
- Peter Eötvös: Lady Sarashina (role: Mezzo), Lyon 2008
- Brice Pauset: Exercises du Silence for voice, piano and electronic. IRCAM, Paris 2008
- Richard Rijnvos: barbara baccante (role: Barbara Strozzi), Amsterdam 2014
- Hristina Šušak: Affectus III for voice and ensemble, Halle 2022
