= Jan Müller-Wieland =

German composer and conductor

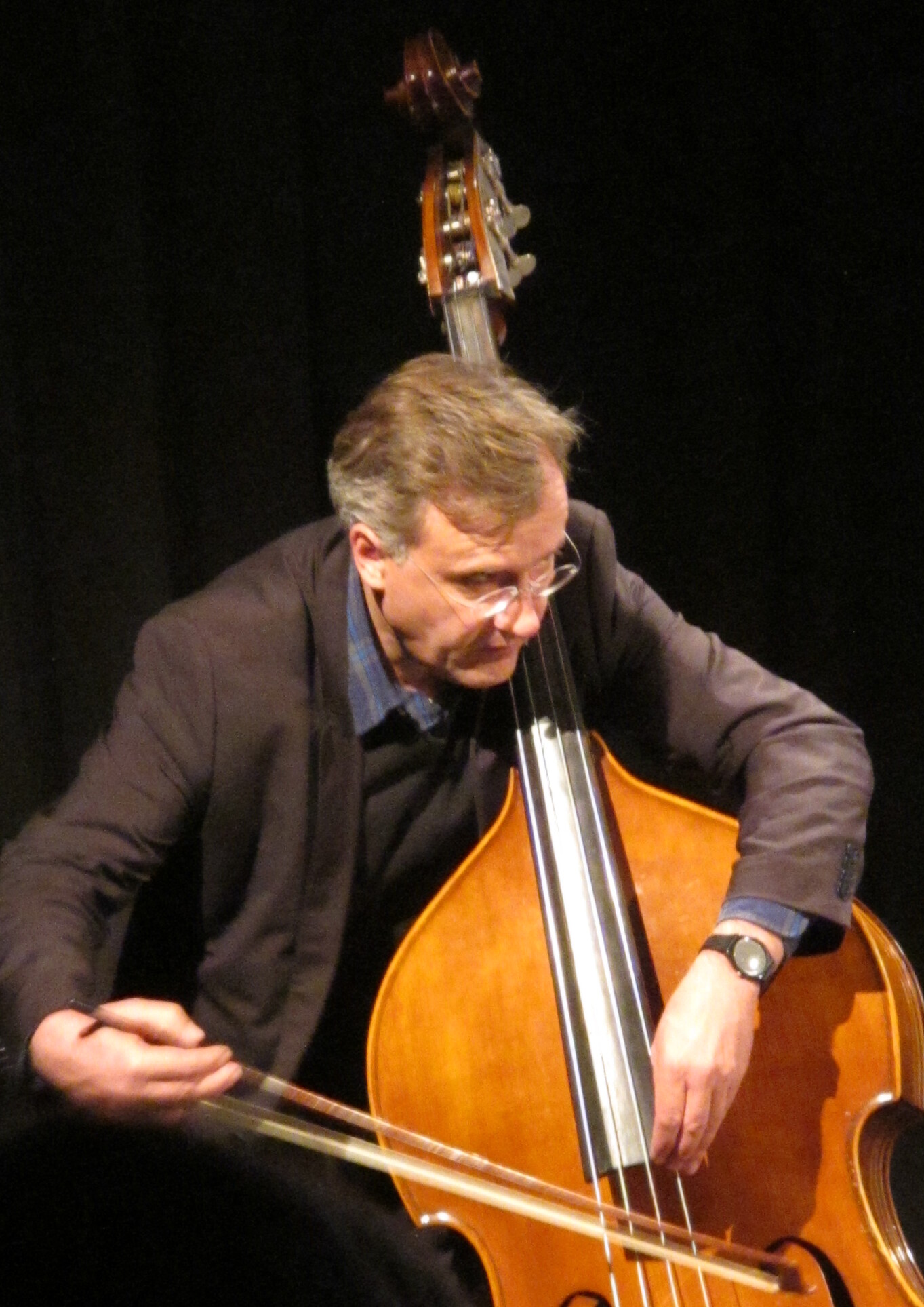
- Jan Müller-Wieland in 2014
- Born: 30 March 1966 (age 60); Hamburg, Germany
- Education: Musikhochschule Lübeck
- Occupations: Composer; Conductor; Academic teacher
- Organizations: Hochschule für Musik und Theater München; A*Devantgarde
- Awards: Villa Massimo; Hindemith Prize; Ernst von Siemens Music Prize
- Website: www.janmueller-wieland.de/s0_english.htm

Jan Müller-Wieland (born 30 March 1966 in Hamburg) is a German composer and conductor of classical music and an academic teacher. He is known for his operas.

== Career ==
Müller-Wieland studied at the Musikhochschule Lübeck, composition with Friedhelm Döhl, double bass with Willi Beyer and conducting with Günther Behrens. He studied composition with Hans Werner Henze in Cologne and Rome, and Oliver Knussen in the Tanglewood Music Center.

Müller-Wieland was a Stipendiat of the Villa Massimo in 1992/93. He was awarded the Hindemith Prize of the Schleswig-Holstein Musik Festival in 1993 and the Ernst von Siemens Composer Prize in 2002. From 2003 he has been a member of the Freie Akademie der Künste in Hamburg.

Müller-Wieland has been a Professor for composition at the Hochschule für Musik und Theater München since 2007.

Müller-Wieland is a member of the festival A*Devantgarde.

He is married to the Austrian author Birgit Müller-Wieland.

== Opera ==
As of 2011, Müller-Wieland had composed 14 operas. His first opera Das Gastspiel, subtitled "Cabaret Farce for singers, pianists and percussionists", a chamber opera after Frank Wedekind's Posse (farce) Der Kammersänger, was premiered at the Munich Biennale in 1992. The libretto of his opera Das Märchen der 672. Nacht (The Fairy tale of the 672nd Night) was written by his wife Birgit Müller-Wieland after a novella by Hugo von Hofmannsthal; the opera was first performed in 2000 at the Wiener Kammeroper conducted by Alexander Drcar. In 2008 his opera Aventure Faust, related to Goethe's Faust, was premiered in the Reaktorhalle in Munich, combined with György Ligeti's "Nouvelles Aventures" for three singers and seven instrumentalists.

== Chamber music premieres ==
Müller-Wieland's third piano trio Se solen sjunker is on a Swedish song which Schubert also used. It was premiered on 29 June 2008 as part of the Piano Festival Ruhr at the Zeche Nordstern in Gelsenkirchen, and was performed by Siegfried Mauser (piano), Gottfried Schneider (violin) and Sebastian Hess (violoncello). His composition for chamber ensemble Traumbilder was commissioned by RUHR.2010, the project of the European Culture Capital, and first performed on 19 May 2010 in the Reinoldikirche Dortmund.

== Selected works ==
=== Stage works ===
Premiere	Title	Description	Libretto and source
29 Apr 1992, Munich Biennale	Das Gastspiel	Chamber opera in one act, 55'	the composer, after the farce Der Kammersänger (1899) by Frank Wedekind
12 Sep 1992, Opera stabile, Hamburgische Staatsoper	Kain	Chamber opera in four scenes, 60'	after the Old Testament
27 Feb 1999, Staatstheater Darmstadt	Die Versicherung	Dream in two parts	the composer, after an earlier drama by Peter Weiss
20 Dec 1996, Darmstadt	Die Nachtigall und die Rose	Chamber opera in one act, 75'	Hannelore Neves, after Oscar Wilde
25 Apr 1998, Munich Biennale	Komödie ohne Titel	Opera, 90'	the composer, after the drama Comedia sin título by Federico García Lorca
29 Jan 2000, Wiener Kammeroper	Das Märchen der 672. Nacht	Opera in six pictures, 75'	Birgit Müller-Wieland, after a novella by Hugo von Hofmannsthal
6 Oct 2001, Theater Görlitz	Nathans Tod	Opera in two acts	after Gotthold Ephraim Lessing and the play by George Tabori
15 Nov 2003, Bühnen der Stadt Köln	Die chinesische Wäscherei	Kurzoper, 7'	Elke Heidenreich
30 Sep 2005, Theater Bonn	Die Irre oder Nächtlicher Fischfang	Musiktheater in one act	Micaela von Marcard
7 Apr 2006, Oper Köln	Der Held der westlichen Welt	Komische Oper, in 3 acts, 105'	the composer, after the German translation by Annemarie and Heinrich Böll of The Playboy of the Western World by John Millington Synge
21 Nov 2008, Reaktorhalle, München	Aventure Faust	Three dream sequences, 40'	Birgit Müller-Wieland, loosely after Faust by Goethe and Deutschland. Ein Wintermärchen by Heine
27 Aug 2009, Neuköllner Oper, Berlin	Fanny und Schraube	Chamber opera in 3 acts, 60'	Kai Ivo Baulitz
28 Jul 2010, Sing- und Musikschule, Regensburg	Der kleine Ring	Musikalisches Märchen for children and adults, in 2 acts	Birgit Müller-Wieland
20 Jan 2011, Neuköllner Oper, Berlin	Der Freischuss	Chamber opera in 3 acts, 60'	after the opera Der Freischütz by Carl Maria von Weber

=== Orchestra ===
- Poem des Morgens (1991) for large orchestra
- Ballad of Ariel (2002) for violin and large orchestra

=== Chamber music ===
- Ecstatic and Instinctive (1989) for two pianos and two percussionists
- Schlaflied (2004) for piano trio
- Se solen sjunker (2008) for piano trio

=== Instrumental music ===
- Himmelfahrt for viola solo (2003)
