= Iris ter Schiphorst =

German composer and musician (born 1956)

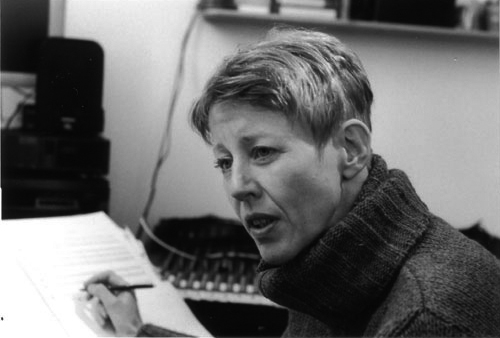
- Iris ter Schiphorst
- Born: 22 May 1956 (age 70)
- Occupation: Composer

Iris ter Schiphorst (born 22 May 1956) is a German composer and musician.

== Early life ==
Iris ter Schiphorst was born in Hamburg into a middle-class family, her father a Dutch technician and her mother a German pianist. She describes music as her "second mother tongue" ("zweite Muttersprache"). She began taking piano lessons, initially from her mother, after her early hopes of becoming a dancer were thwarted by injury.

She continued her piano studies at the Bremen Musikhochschule from 1973 to 1978, and embarked on a busy schedule of concert performances. She then spent two years (1978–1980) travelling in Europe and Africa, an experience that transformed her social and musical outlook. On returning to Germany she began playing in rock bands, including Bremen's all-female Seven Kick the Can. She remained active in rock music from 1980 to 1986, as keyboardist, bassist, drummer, and sound engineer.

ter Schiphorst moved to Berlin in 1984 and from 1986 studied humanities (theatre studies, cultural studies, and philosophy) at the Freie Universität Berlin, later transferring to Humboldt-Universität. She also attended seminars with composers Dieter Schnebel and Luigi Nono and musicologist Helga de la Motte-Haber, but is otherwise self-taught in composition.

== Composing career ==
Ter Schiphorst's experience as a practising musician has been an important influence on her approach to composition. Her music is also informed by her abiding interest in dance.

She began experimenting with classical composition in the 1980s while still playing in rock bands. Early works include Terrible (1982) and Postludium aus Vergessenem (1985).

Later in the decade she co-founded the zeit-Musik collective of composers and musicologists, and concentrated on music exploring the relationship between text and sound. Works from this period include the radio pieces Inside-outside II (1989) and Und was, wenn die Schlange ein Schwein gewesen wäre? (1989).

Her interest in electronic music and sampling techniques led her to form the electro-acoustic ensemble Intrors in 1990, with whom she won the Blaue Brücke composition competition in 1997 for Silence Moves (1997; with Helmut Oehring) and made two recordings, Liebesgeschwüre im Schneckenhaus (1992) and Silence Moves und Anna's Wake (1999). She performed with Intrors on keyboards, synthesiser, and sampler through the 1990s, as well as continuing to give piano concerts.

At the same time, ter Schiphorst was developing an interest in writing for stage and multimedia performance. 1055, die Welt ist noch in Ordnung (1984) is an early example, but it was only in the nineties that this became a large part of her output, beginning with Strings (1991), Anna's Wake, and Z.B. Herz (both 1992).

In 1996 she formed a composing partnership with her sometime companion Helmut Oehring, which lasted until 2001: "Their joint creative activities were inaugurated in 1996 when Oehring asked to use melodic material by Schiphorst in his dance-opera The D’Amato System, premiered at the Munich Biennale. They then experimented with wholesale co-composition in the highly successful Polaroids, which was given its first performance by Ensemble Modern the same year." ter Schiphorst wrote little music under her own name during this period as she focused on collaborative composition and caring for her son. If frequency of performance is any guide, Live: aus Androgyn (1997) is proving to be the most durable of the couple's collaborations.

One work ter Schiphorst did produce independently in the late 1990s, and a significant milestone, was her first composition for full orchestra, Hundert Komma Null (1999). It was commissioned by musica viva Munich and shortlisted for the 2001 Prix Italia. This was followed by Gestures (2001), and a succession of compositions that demonstrate her increasing assurance and maturity.

Recent works such as Die Gänsemagd (2009), Klangrätsel (2010), Grüffelo (2011), and S.O.S. Odysseus (2012–2013; with Uros Rojko) reflect ter Schiphorst's interest in bringing the language of contemporary music to young performers and listeners. In 2016, her orchestral piece Gravitational Waves is premiered by the National Youth Orchestra of Great Britain under the baton of Edward Gardner at Snape Maltings Concert Hall, with further performances at the Birmingham Symphony Hall and the BBC Proms at the Royal Albert Hall.

== Performances ==
ter Schiphorst's music is performed regularly in her native Germany and elsewhere. Her music has been championed by renowned artists such as Martyn Brabbins, the Arditti Quartet, Salome Kammer, Peter Rundel, Roland Kluttig and Evan Christ. Performance listings can be found at ter Schiphorst's website under News and at her Boosey & Hawkes pages under Performances.

== Awards and grants ==
ter Schiphorst has written and lectured occasionally since the mid-1990s, particularly on the relationship between music and text. In 2011 and 2013 she was visiting professor of Experimental Composition at the Berlin University of the Arts. Since 2015 she is professor for Media Composition at the University of Music and Performing Arts in Vienna. In May 2013 she was elected to the Academy of Arts, Berlin.

Her other awards and distinctions include: first prize in the Third Composition Competition for Synthesized and Computerized Music in 1992; her tenure in 2004 as artist-in-residence at Künstlerinnenhof Die Höge, a centre for female artists at Bassum near Bremen; the selection of Zerstören (2005/2006) as an official German entry for the 2007 World Music Days in Hong Kong; the special jury prize at the Internationaler Komponistinnen Wettbewerb in 2008 for Zehn Miniaturen für Cello und Akkordeon (2008); and her selection as one of four prizewinners in the 2011 ad libitum Composition Competition for Klangrätsel (2010). In the summer of 2013, ter Schiphorst was selected for the 2015 Heidelberger Künstlerinnenpreis. The prize, for female composers, is presented at a concert featuring the winner's work in January or February of the prize year; the early notice of selection gives the winner the opportunity to produce a new piece for the occasion, although this is not a requirement. She has also received many grants, scholarships, and commissions.

== Compositions ==
=== 1980s ===
- Terrible (1982; premiered Lüneburg, 1984), for voice, three trumpets, electric guitar, electric bass, and drums.
- 1055, die Welt ist noch in Ordnung (1984), for three spotlights, two female dancers, and two male dancers.
- Postludium aus Vergessenem (1985), for mixed choir and percussion.
- Geschlossene Welt (1986; premiered Oldenburg, 1986), for prepared piano.
- Inside-outside (1988; premiered Berlin, 1988), sound installation, for Walkmen and four-track tape.
- Inside-outside II (1989; first broadcast performance on Radio 100 Berlin, 1989), radio piece after a text by Gertrude Stein.
- Und was, wenn die Schlange ein Schwein gewesen wäre? (1989; first broadcast performance on Österreichischer Rundfunk as part of the Kunstradio-Radiokunst series, 1989), radio piece after a text by Karin Spielhofer.
- Minimal(e) String(en)z (1989; premiered Oldenburg, 1991), for three violins, cello, and systhesiser/keyboard.

=== 1990s ===
- Ballade für einen Bulldozer (1990; premiered Berlin, 1990), for violin and synthesiser/sampler.
- Ergo sum-pf-maschinerie (1990; premiered Berlin, 1990), for violin and synthesiser/sampler.
- In meinem Herzen wächst ein Hühnerauge (1990, premiered Berlin, 1990), sound installation, for sixteen small loudspeakers and four auto-reverse tape recorders.
- Zerstören sagt sie (1990; premiered Berlin, 1990), for violin and synthesiser/sampler.
- Drowned (1990; premiered Oldenburg, 1991), for violin and synthesiser/sampler.
- Liebesgeschwüre (1991; premiered Berlin, 1991), for voice, flute, two violins, and synthesiser/sampler.
- Strings (1991; premiered Berlin, 1991), for tape and solo dancer.
- Eis (1992; premiered Berlin, 1992), for flute and synthesiser/sampler.
- Z.B. Herz (1992; premiered Braunschweig, 1992), for dancer and synthesiser/sampler.
- Anna's Song (1992; premiered Berlin, 1993), for voice, violin, viola, cello, and synthesiser/sampler.
- Anna's Wake (1992; premiered Berlin, 1993), 3-D opera, for soprano, tape, and 16-mm film.
- Nightdances (1992; premiered Berlin, 1994), for voice, two violins, electric bass, and synthesiser/sampler.
- Engeltropfen (1993; first broadcast performance on Österreichischer Rundfunk as part of the Kunstradio-Radiokunst series, 1993), radio piece after a text by Karin Spielhofer.
- Eiszeit (1993; premiered Berlin, 1994), for two voices, two flutes, violin, viola, and synthesiser/sampler.
- Der Blick des Ohrs (1995; premiered Vienna, 1995), for five actors, bass clarinet, and eight-track tape; text after Karin Spielhofer.
- Eden Cinema (1995; premiered Berlin, 1996), for prepared piano and sampler.
- Eden Cinema II (1996/2004; premiered Berlin, 2004), for prepared piano and CD player ad libitum.
- Ballade für Orchester: Hundert Komma Null (1999; premiered Munich, 2000), for orchestra and sampler.

=== 2000s ===
- Gestures (2001; premiered Düsseldorf, 2001), for five male voices, prepared piano, sampler, and CD player.
- Broken (or Why don't you say a word?) (2001/2002; premiered Potsdam, 2002), for small orchestra and sampler.
- Euridice: Szenen aus der Unterwelt (2001/2002; premiered Bielefeld, 2002), chamber opera, for voice, chorus, dancers, seven instruments, and electronics; text by Karin Spielhofer.
- My Sweet Latin Lover (2002; premiered Munich, 2002), for amplified flute with effects, five electric guitars, two percussionists, and sampler.
- My Sweet Latin Lover (2002/2005; premiered Köln, 2005), version for amplified flute with effects and electric guitar.
- My Sweet Latin Lover II (2002; premiered Leipzig, 2002), for amplified flute with effects, electric guitar, and live electronics.
- Wie einen Wasserfisch (2002; premiered Forbach, 2003), for voice and eight instruments.
- Für Akkordeon (2003; premiered Krefeld, 2003), for accordion solo.
- Und Pommernland ist abgebrannt: deutsches Schreiben (2003; premiered Berlin, 2003), for cor anglais, bass flute, amplified bass clarinet, CD player, and effects machine ad libitum.
- Changeant (2004; premiered Stockholm, 2005), for solo voice and CD player ad libitum.
- Erlaube, Fremdling, dass ich dich berühre (2004; premiered Dresden, 2004), for one mime, two ensembles, video projections, and tapes.
- Erlaube, Fremdling, dass ich dich berühre (2004/2005; premiered Berlin, 2005), version for one mime, one female actor, two ensembles, and tapes.
- La Coquille et le Clergyman (2004; premiered Amsterdam, 2005), music for the film by Germaine Dulac (1928), for twelve instruments (two prepared pianos, sampler, harp, electric guitar, two percussionists, strings) and CD soundtrack.
- Aus Kindertagen: Verloren (2004–2005; premiered Köln, 2005), for prepared piano, violin, cello (left ensemble), string quartet, electric guitar (right ensemble), and two CD players; text by Iris ter Schiphorst and from Karin Spielhofer's novel Emilia gerät in die Kriegswirren, oder O der neue Tag (1993).
- Vielleicht Gestern (2005; premiered Dresden, 2006), for bass clarinet.
- Hi Bill (2005; premiered Berlin, 2007), for bass clarinet.
- A Little Madness in the Spring (2005–2006; premiered Porto, 2006), for eighteen instruments, electronics, and three videos; visuals by Daniel Kötter.
- Zerstören (2005/2006; premiered Witten, 2006), for seventeen instruments, sampler, and tape.
- Zerstören II (2006; premiered Siegen, 2007), for large orchestra and sampler.
- No Sir (2007; premiered Neuss, 2007), for flute and Paetzold recorder.
- Vergeben: Bruchstücke zu Edgar Varèse (2007; premiered Köln, 2007), for winds, percussion, and piano.
- Miniaturen für Klarinette und Akkordeon (2008; premiered Berlin, 2008).
- Miniaturen für Cello und Akkordeon (2008; premiered Mönchengladbach, 2009).
- Dislokationen (2008–2009; premiered Munich, 2009), for amplified piano, sampler, and large orchestra.
- Die Gänsemagd (2009; premiered Vienna, 2010), opera for children, for child soprano, two mezzo-sopranos, bass, actor/dancer, bass clarinet, accordion, cello, and sampler; libretto by Helga Utz after The Goose Girl, a fairytale collected by the Brothers Grimm (1815).
- Le Chien Andalou (2009; premiered Berlin, 2010), music for the film by Luis Buñuel and Salvador Dalí (1929), for piccolo trumpet, trombone, cello, electric guitar, piano, and two percussionists.

=== 2010s ===
- Dislokationen II (2010; premiered Munich, 2010), for violin, viola, cello, piano, and sampler.
- Passion 13: Melodram (2010; premiered Leipzig, 2010), for female singer and orchestra.
- Klangrätsel (2010; premiered Dresden, 2011), for youth string orchestra.
- Dead Wire (2010; premiered Stuttgart, 2012), for piano and electronics.
- Aung (2011; premiered Copenhagen, 2011), for singer/performer, percussion, harp, piano, live electronics, and strings; text by Helga Utz.
- Grüffelo (2011; premiered Berlin, 2011), theatre music, for clarinet, horn, piano, violin, cello, and double bass; text after Julia Donaldson's story for children The Gruffalo (1999).
- Miniaturen für Streichquartett und Klarinette (2011; premiered Chemnitz, 2011).
- Studien zu Figuren (2009–2011; premiered Donaueschingen, 2011), for seven amplified voices and sampler.
- Breaking (2011; premiered Berlin, 2012), for ensemble; after Lars van Trier's film Breaking the Waves (1996).
- Vergiss Salome (2012; premiered Hamburg, 2012), scene for coloratura soprano and tape.
- S.O.S. Odysseus (with Uros Rojko) (2012–2013; premiered Köln, 2013), for children's choir ("300 second-graders"), two actors, and orchestra; libretto by Helga Utz.
- Klang-Erzählungen (2013; premiered Braunschweig, 2013), for ensemble.
- Aus Liebe... (2013; premiered Rotterdam, 2014), for string quartet.
- ... meine-keine lieder / die aufgabe von musik (2014; premiered Stuttgart, 2015), for voice and ensemble.
- Welcome to the pleasures: TISA VISA WiTiO ZETA NAFTA TiTiAiPi (2014; premiered Berlin, 2015), for voice and ensemble.
- The Fall of the House of Usher (2014; premiered Zurich, 2014), musik for the silent film by James Sibley Watson and Melville Webber (1928), for ensemble.
- An den Stränden der Ruhe... (2015; premiered Leipzig, 2015), for voices and chamber orchestra.
- ZEICHENKASKADEN (2015), for singer (Bass) with drum and two doublebass clarinets.
- La tristesse durera... (2015; premiered Cottbus, 2015), for chamber orchestra and sampler.
- Sometimes (2015; premiered Cottbus, 2015), for orchestra, sampler and solo piano.
- Aus Liebe... II (2015; premiered Cottbus, 2015), for violin and string orchestra.
- Dr. Faustus Lights the Lights (2016; premiered Bamberg, 2016), music for the play by Gertrude Stein.
- Gravitational Waves (2016; premiered Snape, 2016), for orchestra and electronics.

=== Undated ===
- Marriage Proposal, for mixed ensemble (at least two instruments).

=== Collaborations with Helmut Oehring ===
- Polaroids: Melodram (1996; premiered Donaueschingen, 1996), for female deaf soloist, male soprano/counter-tenor, twelve instruments, and live electronics.
- Live: aus Androgyn (1997; premiered Witten, 1997), eighteen songs, for voice, violin, cello, prepared piano, sampler, and live electronics; text after Anne Sexton's poem "Live" from Live or Die (1966).
- Live: aus Androgyn (1997/2007; premiered Kaiserslautern, 2007), eighteen songs, version for counter-tenor, violin, cello, prepared piano, sampler, and live electronics.
- Silence Moves (1997; premiered Dresden, 1997), soundtrack for an imaginary film, for voice, violin, cello, electric bass, prepared piano, sampler, live electronics, prerecorded performance CD, and video installation.
- Silence Moves II (1997; premiered Rome, 1997), for voice, violin, prepared piano, sampler, electric guitar, bass guitar, percussion, live electronics, and tapes.
- Prae-Senz (Ballet Blanc II) (1997; premiered Berlin, 1997), for violin, cello and prepared piano, and sampler.
- Im Vormonat (1997/1998; premiered Saarbrücken, 1998), for oboe, bass clarinet, bassoon, percussion, piano, violin, cello, and double bass.
- A.N. (evita-che guevara-madonna) (1998; premiered Liège, 1998), for two voices, eight instruments, and live electronics.
- Requiem (1998; premiered Paris 1998), for three counter-tenors, twelve instruments, and live electronics; text after Anne Sexton's psalm sequence "O Ye Tongues" from The Death Notebooks (1974).
- Mischwesen (la tristessa durera) (1998; premiered Ghent, 1998), for female deaf soloist, three trumpets, and keyboard sampler; text after Anne Sexton's poem "The Silence" from The Book of Folly (1972), with additional words by Oehring and ter Schiphorst; visuals by Daniel Kötter.
- Mischwesen (la tristessa durera) (1998/1999, premiered Bremen, 1999), version for female deaf soloist, oboe, flute, bassoon, and keyboard.
- Mischwesen (la tristessa durera) (1998/2002, premiered Kassel, 2002), version for female deaf soloist, flute, clarinet, bassoon, and keyboard.
- Mischwesen (la tristessa durera) (1998/2002, premiered Berlin, 2002), version for female deaf soloist, trumpet, trombone, tuba, and keyboard.
- Mischwesen (la tristessa durera) (1998/2007, premiered Kaiserslautern, 2007), version for female deaf soloist, trumpet, bass clarinet, cello, and keyboard.
- Bernada Albas Haus (1999; premiered Basel 1999), dance-theatre music, for female deaf soloist, male soprano/counter-tenor, seven dancers, electric guitar, double bass, and live electronics; after Federico García Lorca's play La casa de Bernarda Alba (1936; first performed 1945).
- Der Ort ist nicht der Ort (2000; premiered Hannover, 2000), music-theatre action, for female deaf soloist, soprano, male soprano/counter-tenor, ensemble, live electronics, light, and graphics; libretto by ter Schiphorst and Oehring; graphics by Hagen Klennert.
- Als ob: Suite (2000; premiered Dresden 2000), music and dance project, for dancer, sub-bass recorder, bass clarinet, electric guitar, piano/keyboard, accordion, and two percussionists.
- Effi Briest (2000; premiered Bonn, 2001), music theatre psychogram in four acts, for female deaf soloist, voice, male soprano/counter-tenor, female speaker, ensemble, and live electronics; libretto by Oehring and ter Schiphorst after Theodor Fontane's novel Effi Briest (1894).
- Etius (2000; premiered Oldenburg, 2001), ensemble version of Als ob: Suite, for sub-bass recorder, bass clarinet, electric guitar, piano, sampler, accordion, and two percussionists.
- Rumgammeln und warten (2001; premiered Basel, 2001), for solo voice, female deaf soloist, ensemble, and prerecorded performance CD; text by Oehring and ter Schiphorst.
- Berlin: Sinfonie einer Großstadt (2001; premiered Berlin, 2002), music for the film by Thomas Schadt (2002), for large orchestra.

== Discography ==
ter Schiphorst's independent compositions are poorly documented on record. Her collaborations with Helmut Oehring are slightly better served. Many of these recordings are out of print.

=== Works by ter Schiphorst ===
- Ballade für einen Bulldozer (1990), Ergo sum-pf-maschinerie (1990), Drowned (1990), and Liebesgeschwüre (1991) appear on Liebesgeschwüre im Schneckenhaus: Electroacoustic Compositions, performed by Ensemble Intrors (Susanne Schulz, Gisburg Smialek, Iris ter Schiphorst) (ITS, 1992).
- Anna's Wake (1992) appears on Silence Moves und Anna's Wake, performed by Ensemble Intrors (ITS, 1999).
- La Coquille et le Clergyman (2004) appears on Germaine Dulac: Drei Filme der französischen Stummfilm-Pionierin 1922-1928 (DVD), performed by the Asko Ensemble and Peter Rundel (Absolut Medien, 2007).
- Hi Bill (2005) appears on Bass Clarinet, performed by Volker Hemken (Profil – Edition Günter Hänssler, 2006).
- Zerstören (2005/2006) appears on Wittener Tage für neue Kammermusik 2006, performed by the Asko Ensemble and Hans Leenders (Kulturforum Witten, 2006).
- No Sir (2007) appears on Neue Flötentöne Live, performed by Dörte Nienstedt and Anne Horstmann (AO / NRW Vertrieb, 2008).
- Studien zu Figuren (2011) appears on Donaueschinger Musiktage 2011, performed by Neue Vocalsolisten Stuttgart (NEOS, 2011).

=== Works by ter Schiphorst and Oehring ===
- Polaroids: Melodram (1996) appears on Donaueschinger Musiktage 1996, performed by Christina Schönfeld, Arno Raunig, Ensemble Modern, and Jürg Wyttenbach (Col Legno, 1996); an excerpt from the same performance appears on Musik in Deutschland 1950-2000: Musiktheater > Experimentelles Musiktheater > Visible Music (Sony / Deutscher Musikrat, 2004).
- Silence Moves (1997) appears on Silence Moves und Anna's Wake, performed by Ensemble Intrors (ITS, 1999).
- Prae-Senz (Ballet Blanc II) (1997) appears on Chamber Music, performed by Ensemble Ictus (Cyprès, 2000).
- Live: aus Androgyn (1997) appears on Wittener Tage für neue Kammermusik 1997, performed by Salome Kammer, Kammerensemble Neue Musik Berlin, and Roland Kluttig (Kulturforum Witten, 1997).
- Live: aus Androgyn (1997) and Im Vormonat (1997/1998) appear on Kammermusik, performed by Salome Kammer and Ensemble Aventure (Ars Musici / Freiburger Musik Forum, 2000).
- Requiem (1998) appears on Donaueschinger Musiktage 1998, performed by Arno Raunig, David Newman, Jean Nirouët, Helmut Oehring, Ensemble Ictus, and Georges Octors (Col Legno, 1998).
- Bernada Albas Haus (1999) (excerpt) appears on Musik in Deutschland 1950–2000: Musiktheater > Tanztheater > Motive der Weltliteratur, performed by Arno Raunig, Christina Schönfeld, Jörg Wilkendorf, Peter Kowald, Markus Reschtnewki, and Torsten Ottersberg (RCA / Deutscher Musikrat, 2005).
- Berlin: Sinfonie einer Großstadt (2001) appears on Berlin: Sinfonie einer Großstadt (DVD), performed by the Staatsoper Unter den Linden, Sinfonieorchester des Südwestrundfunks, and Roland Kluttig (Arthaus Musik / Monarda, 2009).

== Texts ==
=== Essays ===
- "Texte ohne Spuren? Vom Verhältnis von Stimme und Frau", Frauen Musik Büro Rundbrief (Frankfurt am Main), No. 26, October–December 1994 (Part 1), and No. 27, January–March 1995 (Part 2).
- "Helmut Oehring: Dokumentaroper (aus: Irrenoffensive) (1994-1995)", text for the CD booklet (Mainz: Wergo, 1997).
- "Ohrsinn / Unsinn / Eigensinn: eine kurze Abhandlung über Schrift", Ästhetik & Kommunikation (Berlin), No. 101, June 1998.
- "Berühren", Positionen: Texte zur aktuellen Musik (Mühlenbeck), No. 44, August 2000.
- "Mutterpartituren", Positionen: Texte zur aktuellen Musik (Mühlenbeck), No. 58, February 2004.
- "Komponieren heute? Einige Anmerkungen zum Verhältnis von Schrift und Musik, Moderne/Postmoderne, Neue (Massen-) Medien", Parergon: Tidsskrift for Samtidsmusikk (Oslo), No. 25/26, 2004 (Old Series).
- "Schönheit? Antworten von jungen Komponistinnen und Komponisten", Positionen: Texte zur aktuellen Musik (Mühlenbeck), No. 64, August 2005.

=== Lectures ===
- "Vom Ohrsinn und Unsinn / Der Blick in der Musik", West-Berliner Akademie der Künste, Berlin, 1994.
- "Musikwissenschaft als Geisterwissenschaft, oder: Das Ver-Sprechen von Sound", Female Music Rush-Hour: Ninth International Congress on Women in Music, Vienna, 1995.
- "Einige Anmerkungen zum Verhältnis von Stimme und Schrift", Humboldt-Universität, Berlin, 1997.
- "Die stillschweigende Verschaltung von Stimme und Schrift", Galerie Waszkowiak, Berlin, 2000.
- "Warum ein Stipendium für Künstlerinnen?" Künstlerinnenhof Die Höge, Bassum, 2004.

=== Program notes ===
- "Expert in the In-between – Ballade für Orchester: Hundert Komma Null", Musica Viva, February 2000.
- "Zerstören", Wittener Tage für neue Kammermusik, May 2006.
- "Vergeben: Bruchstücke zu Edgar Varèse", Festivals Musik der Zeit, November 2007.

=== Interviews ===
- "Gespräch mit Iris ter Schiphorst", in Karl-Heinz Blomann and Frank Sielecki (eds), Hören: eine vernachlässigte Kunst (Hofheim am Taunus: Wolke Verlag, 1997).
- "Gesamtkunstwerk aus Musik und Bildern: Iris ter Schiphorst und Helmut Oehring feilen an einer Filmmusik, Gespräch mit dem Musikwissenschaftler Lasse Ole Hempel", Neue Musikzeitung (Regensburg), No. 10, 2001.
- "Dimensionen des Handwerks heute: ein Gespräch", Positionen: Texte zur aktuellen Musik (Mühlenbeck), No. 53, November 2002.
- "Interview mit Iris ter Schiphorst (2002)", in Susanne Binas, Erfolgreiche Künstlerinnen: Arbeiten zwischen Eigensinn und Kulturbetrieb (Essen: Klartext Verlag, 2003); in association with the Kulturforum der Sozialdemokratie.
- "Eurydike, oder der Topos des Verschwindens, die Komponistin Iris ter Schiphorst im Gespräch mit Frank Kämpfer", Neue Zeitschrift für Musik (Mainz), No. 5, 2003.
