= New Simplicity =

Music genre and movement

New Simplicity (in German, Neue Einfachheit) was a stylistic tendency amongst some of the younger generation of German composers in the late 1970s and early 1980s, reacting against not only the European avant garde of the 1950s and 1960s, but also against the broader tendency toward objectivity found from the beginning of the twentieth century. Alternative terms sometimes used for this movement are "Inclusive Composition", "New Subjectivity" (Neue Subjektivität), "New Inwardness" (Neue Innigkeit), "New Romanticism", "New Sensuality", "New Expressivity", "New Classicism", and "New Tonality" (neotonality).

== Goals ==
At the end of the 1970s, the German movement was first recognized by Aribert Reimann, who named seven composers, not previously associated as a group, who had each come to similar positions "in an entirely personal fashion". These seven composers were: Hans-Jürgen von Bose, Hans-Christian von Dadelsen, Detlev Müller-Siemens, Wolfgang Rihm, Wolfgang von Schweinitz, Ulrich Stranz, and Manfred Trojahn. In general, these composers strove for an immediacy between the creative impulse and the musical result (in contrast to the elaborate precompositional planning characteristic of the avant garde), with the intention also of communicating more readily with audiences. In some cases this meant a return to the tonal language of the 19th century as well as to the traditional forms (symphony, sonata) and instrumental combinations (string quartet, piano trio) which had been avoided for the most part by the avant garde. For others it meant working with simpler textures or the employment of triadic harmonies in non-tonal contexts. Of the composers most closely identified with this movement, only Wolfgang Rihm has established a significant reputation outside of Germany. At least three writers have gone so far as to argue that one of the Darmstadt avant-garde composers against whom the New Simplicity was ostensibly rebelling, Karlheinz Stockhausen, had anticipated their position through a radical simplification of his style accomplished between 1966 and 1975, which culminated in his Tierkreis melodies. Another writer finds Rihm's inclusive aesthetic better viewed as "an expansion of constructivist concerns . . . than as a negation of them".

== Other groups ==
There is a quite distinct group of composers also active in Germany and elsewhere, to whom the term 'New Simplicity' is occasionally applied. These are particularly associated with the Cologne School and include such figures as Walter Zimmermann, Johannes Fritsch, Ladislav Kupkovič, Péter Eötvös, Bojidar Dino, Daniel Chorzempa, John McGuire, Mesías Maiguashca, and Clarence Barlow, as well as others from different countries such as Christopher Fox, Gerald Barry, Gavin Bryars, and Kevin Volans. Most of these composers tend to use quite sparse, pared-down musical material (sometimes showing the influence of the early 'naive' period of work from John Cage, and that of Morton Feldman, especially in the case of Zimmermann) to which are applied more intricate musical processes; in the latter respect, the influence of Stockhausen and Mauricio Kagel is clear, though some of the figures concerned believed their aesthetic to constitute a break with the avant-garde as represented in particular at Darmstadt. In the United States and the Americas composers like Samuel Barber, Miguel del Aguila and Astor Piazzolla challenged the concept of music as an experiment with works that became instantly popular and remained in the classical music repertoire to this day.

In Denmark some fifteen years earlier than the German movement, a less widely known group also called "The New Simplicity" (Den Ny Enkelhed) arose, including composers Hans Abrahamsen, Henning Christiansen, and Pelle Gudmundsen-Holmgreen. This was seen as a specifically Danish response to the complexity of music of the Darmstadt School, but differed from the later German group in that these composers sought to increase rather than decrease objectivity by using the simplest, impersonal musical material in order to liberate it from the composer’s attitudes and feelings.

This term has also been used essentially synonymously with the related but distinct group of composers such as Henryk Górecki, Arvo Pärt, and John Tavener, whose music is often described as Holy minimalism.

== Reception ==
By the 1990s a new radical approach to composition began to emerge in Germany, reacting against the New Simplicity's pluralism, which tended to acquire arbitrary features in composers lacking solid technical ability. Reference to earlier styles provoked unfavourable comparisons: the aim of comprehensibility and accessibility was seen to have been better achieved by music of the past and in more authentic forms.

== Other New Simplicity composers ==
- Peter Michael Hamel
- Peter Ruzicka
- Manfred Stahnke
