= David Philip Hefti =

Swiss composer and conductor (born 1975)

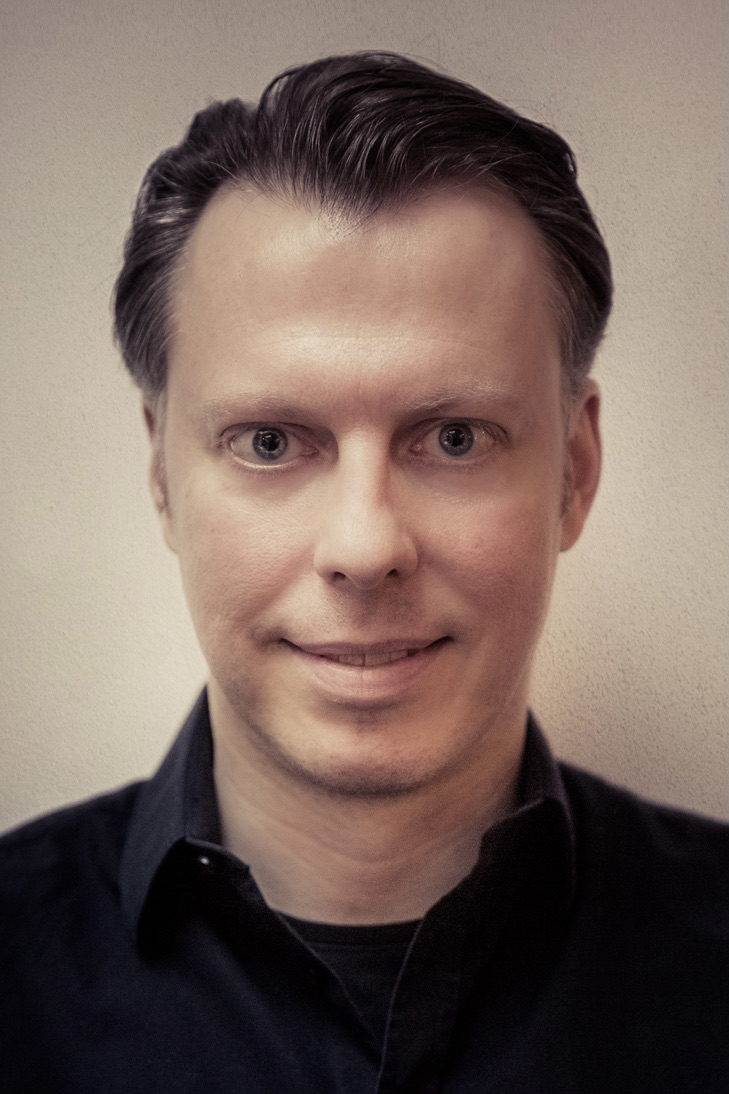
David Philip Hefti, 2017 © Tabea Hüberli

David Philip Hefti (born 1975) is a Swiss composer and conductor.

== Education ==
Born in St. Gallen, Hefti studied composition, conducting, clarinet and chamber music with Wolfgang Rihm, Cristóbal Halffter, Wolfgang Meyer, Rudolf Kelterborn and Elmar Schmid in Zürich and Karlsruhe.

== Career ==
Hefti has appeared on five continents at festivals such as Ultraschall in Berlin, Schleswig-Holstein Musik Festival, Heidelberger Frühling, Musica de Hoy in Madrid, Wien Modern, Steirischer Herbst in Graz, Menuhin in Gstaad, Dvorak-Festival in Prague, Beijing Modern, Suntory in Tokyo and as the composer-in-residence at the Moritzburg Festival, at the Schlossmediale Werdenberg, with the Heidelberg Philharmonic and with the Zermatt Music Festival. He has worked with soloists such as Benjamin Appl, Juliane Banse, Fabio Di Càsola, Mojca Erdmann, Thomas Grossenbacher, Viviane Hagner, Thomas Indermühle, Cornelia Kallisch, Patricia Kopatchinskaja, Wolfgang Meyer, Sylvia Nopper, Christian Poltéra, Lawrence Power, Hartmut Rohde, Baiba Skride, Jan Vogler, Antje Weithaas and with conductors such as Douglas Boyd, Péter Eötvös, Roberto González-Monjas, Howard Griffiths, Giancarlo Guerrero, Cornelius Meister, Kent Nagano, Jonathan Nott, Andris Poga, Michael Sanderling, Jac van Steen, Mario Venzago, Ralf Weikert, Kazuki Yamada and David Zinman. Hefti's work has brought him together with the Bavarian Radio Symphony Orchestra, the Bavarian State Orchestra, the Deutsches Symphonie-Orchester Berlin, the Berlin Baroque Soloists, the Bamberg Symphony, the German Radio Philharmonic Orchestra, the Tonhalle Orchester Zürich, the Vienna Radio Symphony Orchestra, the Montréal Symphony Orchestra, the Tokyo Sinfonietta, the Scharoun Ensemble Berlin, the Leipzig String Quartet, the Neue Vocalsolisten Stuttgart, the Ensemble Modern and the Collegium Novum Zürich.

== Awards ==
Hefti is the winner of the prestigious composition competitions Gustav Mahler in Vienna, Pablo Casals in Prades, George Enescu in Bucharest and was awarded the Hindemith Prize, the Ernst von Siemens Composer Prize and the Composer Award of the International Classical Music Awards (ICMA).

== Sources ==
- Hefti, David Philip, Edition Kunzelmann
