= Johannes Maria Staud =

Austrian composer (born 1974)

- Born: 17 August 1974 (age 51); Innsbruck, Austria
- Education: University of Music and Performing Arts Vienna; Hochschule für Musik Hanns Eisler Berlin
- Occupation: Composer
- Awards: Ernst von Siemens Music Prize; Hindemith Prize

Johannes Maria Staud (born 17 August 1974) is an Austrian composer. His works have been performed internationally by major orchestras, ensembles, and soloists, and he has received several composition prizes.

== Biography ==
Staud was born on 17 August 1974 in Innsbruck. He studied musicology and philosophy in Vienna before continuing his composition studies with Brian Ferneyhough and Michael Jarrell at the University of Music and Performing Arts Vienna, and later with Hanspeter Kyburz at the Hochschule für Musik Hanns Eisler Berlin. From 1999 to 2000 he was a fellow of the Alban Berg Foundation, and in 2000 he signed a publishing contract with Universal Edition. He is also a co-founder of the Vienna-based composers' group Gegenklang.

== Career ==
=== Early major works ===
Staud achieved early international recognition with Apeiron (2005), commissioned by the Berlin Philharmonic and premiered under Sir Simon Rattle and Segue (2006), for violoncello and orchestra, written for Heinrich Schiff and the Vienna Philharmonic under Daniel Barenboim at the Salzburg Festival.

=== Later career ===
In 2010–2011, Staud served as Capell-Compositeur of the Staatskapelle Dresden. His orchestral work Maniai was premiered in 2012 by the Bavarian Radio Symphony Orchestra under Mariss Jansons. Other significant works of the 2010s include Auf die Stimme der weißen Kreide (Specter I–III) (2015), premiered at Festival Musica in Strasbourg, and the diptych Par ici ! – Par là ! (2015), performed in full by Ensemble Intercontemporain at the Acht Brücken festival in Cologne.

Staud has also composed extensively for opera. Die Antilope (2014), on a libretto by Durs Grünbein, was premiered at the Lucerne Festival. His opera Die Weiden (2018), also with a text by Grünbein, was staged at the Vienna State Opera under conductor Ingo Metzmacher. Other collaborations with Grünbein include the monodrama Der Riss durch den Tag (2011), written for Bruno Ganz.

His orchestral work Stromab (2017) was premiered by the Royal Danish Orchestra under Alexander Vedernikov, followed by performances in Vienna, Cleveland, and New York. In 2018, the Vienna Philharmonic premiered his work Scattered Light. Later works include Terra pinguis (2019) for the Munich Chamber Orchestra, Terra fluida (2019) for the Boulanger Trio, and Epicentre. Seismic construction in 3 parts (2020) for three percussionists.

Recent vocal and ensemble works include Listen, Revolution (we’re buddies, see –) (2021), premiered by ensemble xx. jahrhundert at Wien Modern, and two settings of William Carlos Williams: Jittering Directions (2022) for soprano and orchestra, premiered by Yeree Suh and the Vienna Symphony under Andrés Orozco-Estrada, and Once Anything Might Have Happened (2022) for soprano, horn, ensemble, and live electronics, commissioned by Ensemble Intercontemporain and IRCAM. In 2023 his music theatre work Missing in Cantu, with a libretto by Thomas Köck, premiered at the Kunstfest Weimar.

=== Current projects ===
In 2023 the percussion concerto Whereas the Reality Trembles was premiered by Christoph Sietzen and the Cleveland Orchestra under Franz Welser-Möst. The work, co-commissioned by Wiener Konzerthaus, BR, WDR, and SWR, has been performed during the 2024–25 season in Vienna, Munich, Essen, Stuttgart, and Hamburg. Other projects include Die schöne Müllerin / These Fevered Days, an instrumental version of Schubert's cycle interwoven with settings of Emily Dickinson texts.

Since 2018 he has been Professor of Composition at the Mozarteum University Salzburg. He is also co-initiator of the annual summer academy of composition Arco, alternating between Marseille and Salzburg.

== Awards ==
- 2001 – Special music prize of the Austrian Republic
- 2002 – Composition award of the Salzburg Easter Festival
- 2002 – Erste Bank Composition Prize
- 2003 – International Rostrum of Composers Prize
- 2004 – Ernst von Siemens Composer Prize
- 2009 – Hindemith Prize
- 2012 – Preis der Stadt Wien für Musik

== Works ==
=== Piano ===
- Hommage à Bartók I (1994)
- Hommage à Bartók II (1994)
- Bewegungen (1996)
- Go Ahead (2004)
- Peras (2005)

=== Solos ===
- Black Moon for bass clarinet (1998)
- Towards a Brighter Hue for violin (2004)
- Portugal for percussions (2006)
- Celluloid for solo bassoon ( 2011)

=== Chamber music ===
- Dichotomie for string quartet (1997/98)
- Esquisse retouchée (Incipit 2) for trombone (with bass drum) (2002)
- Configurations / Reflet for 8 players (2002)
- Sydenham Music for flute, viola, and harp (2007)
- Für Bálint András Varga, 10 miniatures for violin, cello, and piano (2007)
- Lagrein for violin, clarinet, cello, and piano (2008)

=== Orchestra ===
- ...gleichsam als ob... for orchestra (1999/2000)
- A map is not the territory for large ensemble (2001)
- Berenice. Suite 1 for ensemble and tape (2004)
- Berenice. Suite 2 for ensemble (2004)
- Apeiron for large orchestra (2005)
- On Comparative Meteorology for orchestra (new version) (2010)
- Contrebande (On Comparative Meteorology II) (2010)
- Tondo Preludio for orchestra (2010)
- Chant d'amour variation on miniature No 9 from Für Bálint András Varga. 10 Miniaturen für Klaviertrio (2007–2009) for ensemble (2010)

=== Concertos ===
- Incipit for alto trombone and 5 instruments (2000)
- Polygon for piano and orchestra (2002)
- Incipit III (Esquisse retouchée II) for trombone, string orchestra, 2 horns and percussion (2005)
- Violent Incidents (Hommage à Bruce Nauman) for saxophone, wind ensemble and percussion (2005/2006)
- One Movement and Five Miniatures for harpsichord, live-electronics and ensemble (2006/2007, new version 2009)
- Im Lichte for 2 pianos and orchestra (2007)
- Segue for cello and orchestra (new version) (2008)
- Über trügerische Stadtpläne und die Versuchungen der Winternächte (Dichotomie II) for string quartet and orchestra (2008/2009)

=== Vocal works ===
- Die Ebene (after texts by Hans Arp) for speaker, horn, 2 trombones, 2 percussionists, piano, 2 cellos and double bass (1997)
- Vielleicht zunächst wirklich nur, 6 miniatures for soprano and 6 instruments (1999)
- der kleinste abstand zwischen zwei gegenständen (after visual texts by Heinz Gappmayr) for 16 voices a cappella (1999)
- Berenice. Lied vom Verschwinden (text by Durs Grünbein after Edgar Allan Poe) for soprano, small ensemble and tape (2003)
- Arie am Rand alter Bücher for baritone, piano, bamboo chimes and tape (2005)

=== Operas ===
- Berenice, text by Durs Grünbein, after Edgar Allan Poe; world premiere at the Munich Biennale 2004; Heidelberg 2005
- Die Antilope, 2014, Lucerne
- Die Weiden, libretto by Durs Grünbein, 2018, Vienna State Opera Conductor: Ingo Metzmacher, Director: Andrea Moses

== Discography ==
- Johannes Maria STAUD, including A map is not the territory; Bewegungen; Polygon. Musik für Klavier und Orchester; Black Moon; Berenice. Lied vom Verschwinden, Marino Formenti (piano), Petra Hoffmann (soprano), Ernesto Molinari (bass clarinet), Thomas Larcher (piano), Klangforum Wien (Sylvain Cambreling), Vienna Radio Symphony Orchestra (Bertrand de Billy), CD KAIROS, 2003, n° 0012392KAI.
- Johannes Maria STAUD, Apeiron, including Apeiron; Incipit III; Towards a Brighter Hue; Violent Incidents; Peras. Berlin Philharmonic Orchestra (Sir Simon Rattle), WDR Symphony Orchestra (Lothar Zagrosek), Windkraft Tirol (Kasper de Roo), Marcus Weiss (saxophon), Uwe Dierksen (trombone), Marino Formenti (piano), Ernst Kovacic (violin), CD KAIROS, 2007, n° 0012672KAI.
