= Klaus Schedl =

German composer (born 1966)

- Born: 4 January 1966 (age 60); Stuttgart, West Germany
- Education: Mozarteum; Hochschule für Musik und Theater München
- Occupation: Composer
- Organizations: A•DEvantgarde
- Website: www.klausschedl.de

Klaus Schedl (born 4 January 1966, in Stuttgart) is a German composer.

Klaus Schedl studied from 1991 to 1996 composition with Hans-Jürgen von Bose at the Salzburg Mozarteum and the Hochschule für Musik und Theater München. In 1993 he founded the piano possibile ensemble for contemporary music. From 1998 he taught at the conservatory of Coimbra. In 2001 he studied on a scholarship of Bavaria at the IRCAM.

In 2005 he received a project scholarship from the city of Munich for City Scan München, which was premiered in 2006 as part of the Munich Biennale. In 2010 his opera Tilt, on a libretto by Roland Quitt after the diary of Sir Walter Raleigh, was performed as part of the triple bill entitled Amazonas (with Der Einsturz des Himmels and In Erwartung) at the Munich Biennale, also in São Paulo and Rotterdam. In 2011 his song cycle Les Fleurs du Mal after Charles Baudelaire was premiered.

Klaus Schedl is a member of the festival A•DEvantgarde.
