= André Werner =

German composer of classical music (born 1960)

- Born: 4 June 1960 (age 66); Bremerhaven, West Germany
- Education: Hochschule der Künste Berlin
- Occupation: Composer
- Awards: Villa Massimo; Ernst von Siemens Composers' Prize
- Website: www.andrewerner.eu

André Werner (born 4 June 1960 in Bremerhaven) is a German composer of classical music.

Werner studied classical guitar and oboe at the Musikhochschule Bremen from 1980 to 1986, composition from 1986 to 1992 at the Hochschule der Künste Berlin with Frank Michael Beyer. He was a Stipendiat of the Villa Massimo in 1995/96, and won an Ernst von Siemens Composer Prize in 2001.

His opera Marlowe: Der Jude von Malta on his own libretto after the play The Jew of Malta by Christopher Marlowe was premiered at the Munich Biennale in 2002.
