= Wolfgang von Schweinitz =

German composer

- Born: 7 February 1953 (age 73); Hamburg, Germany
- Education: Musikhochschule Hamburg; Stanford University
- Occupations: Composer; Academic teacher
- Organizations: Hochschule für Musik "Franz Liszt", Weimar; California Institute of the Arts
- Awards: Villa Massimo; Schneider-Schott Music Prize; Hindemith Prize

Wolfgang von Schweinitz (born 7 February 1953 in Hamburg) is a German composer of classical music and an academic teacher.

== Career ==
Schweinitz studied composition at the Hochschule für Musik und Theater Hamburg, from 1971 to 1973 with Gernot Klussmann and from 1973 to 1975 with György Ligeti. He continued his studies at the Stanford University with John Chowning. He was a Stipendiat of the Villa Massimo in 1978, at the same time as Sarah Kirsch. In 1980 he taught at the Darmstädter Ferienkurse. His opera Patmos, based on the Apocalypse of St John, was premiered in 1990 at the second Munich Biennale.

From 1994 to 1996, Schweinitz was a professor of composition at the Hochschule für Musik "Franz Liszt", Weimar. In 2007 he succeeded composer James Tenney at the California Institute of the Arts. He retired in 2025.

== Music ==
Schweinitz's music is often characterized by its freely expressive counterpoint exploring the distinctive melodic and harmonic networks of just intonation within a rigorously structured formal logic.

== Awards ==
- 1986 Schneider-Schott Music Prize
- 1992 Hindemith Prize of the Schleswig-Holstein Musik Festival

== Recordings ==
- Variationen über ein Thema von Mozart, Harmonia Mundi Deutschland OCLC 1284522633
- Mass for soloists, choir and orchestra op. 21, Radio Symphonie Orchester Berlin, WERGO, 1988 OCLC 313257403
- Klang, Goeyvaerts String Trio, Louth Contemporary Music, 2019 OCLC 1143426812
