= Tato Taborda =

Tato Taborda (born Curitiba, 1960), is a Brazilian composer, pianist and teacher.

After his studies with Hans Joachim Koellreutter, Esther Scliar and R. Murray Schafer, he took classes with Helmut Lachenmann, Gordon Mumma and Dieter Schnebel at the Cursos Latinoamericanos de Música Contemporânea (Latin American Workshops for New Music) between 1978 and 1989.

From 1983, he, has intensively collaborated with the contemporary theatre and dance scene in Brazil. As composer, has works commissioned by Donaueschinger Musiktage, Berliner Festspiele, Pro-Musica Nova Bremem, Festival of Perth, International São Paulo's Bienal, and Münchenner Biennale. .

His doctoral thesis, completed in 2004 at the University of Rio de Janeiro (Unirio), compared the communication strategies of nocturnal animals with the techniques of counterpoint and polyphony.

Taborda's first opera, A Queda do Céu (German title: Der Einsturz des Himmels; English title: The Fall of the Sky) was given its world premiere as part of the Amazonas trilogy at the 2010 Munich Biennale.
