= Birke J. Bertelsmeier =

German classical composer

Birke Jasmin Bertelsmeier (born 23 April 1981) is a German composer.

== Life ==
Born on 23 April 1981 in Hilden, Bertelsmeier received piano lessons from Barbara Szczepanska and composition lessons from David Graham as a schoolgirl. After graduating from high school, she studied piano with Pavel Gililov at the Hochschule für Musik und Tanz Köln (diploma 2005) and composition with Wolfgang Rihm at the Hochschule für Musik Karlsruhe (diploma 2008, concert exam 2011). She also completed a master's degree in musicology in 2009. Her works are performed at international festivals and by various performers, such as the Arditti Quartet, Quatuor Diotima, Ensemble Modern, Ensemble ascolta, Ensemble recherche, Fukio Saxophone Quartet, LUX:NM, Marc Bouchkov, Erik Nielsen, Christoph Eschenbach, Tabea Zimmermann, Orchester Nationale de Lorraine, Bad Reichenhaller Philharmoniker, Bamberg Symphony and by members of the Berliner Philharmonic. In 2017, her orchestral work for the 80th anniversary of the Bombing of Guernica was premiered for the Bilbao Orkestra Sinfonikoa with choir and children's choir.

In 2014, two music theatre works, Querelle of Brest after Jean Genet and The Nightingale and the Rose after Oscar Wilde's short story of that name, were premiered at the Deutsche Oper Berlin, and at Klang 21's Taschenopernfestival [Pocket Opera Festival] in Salzburg in 2017 the piece Gib mir Dein after a story by Thomas Mann.

Bertelsmeier taught composition in youth seminars at the Beethoven House and the Landesmusikrat Nordrhein-Westfalen [State Music Council of North Rhine-Westphalia]. From 2009 to 2011, she taught improvisation and composition at the Hochschule für Musik, Theater und Medien Hannover.

== Prizes and scholarships ==
- 2006/07 Scholarship of the Hoepfner Foundation
- 2009 Scholarship of the Brahms House
- 2009 Scholarship Dorothea Erxleben Hannover
- 2010 Laureate of the Yvar Mikhashoff Competition NY
- 2011/12 Scholarship of the International Ensemble Modern Academy
- 2011/13 Scholarship of the Akademie Musiktheater heute (Deutsche Bank Foundation)
- 2012 Residency scholarship of the Künstlerhaus Edenkoben
- 2012 Schneider-Schott Music Prize
- 2013 Scholarship of the German Academy Villa Massimo
- 2014 Karlsruhe Composition Prize
- 2015 Ernst von Siemens Composer Prize
- 2016/17 IRCAM Paris (Institut de Recherche et Coordination Acoustique/Musique).
- 2018/19 International House of Artists Villa Concordia Bamberg
- 2026 Hindemith Prize
