= Babette Koblenz =

German composer

Babette Koblenz (born 22 August 1956 in Hamburg) is a German composer associated with Neue Einfachheit.

== Life and work ==
From the age of twelve, Koblenz studied at the music theory at the Hochschule für Musik und Theater Hamburg. Her compositions have been performed at the Munich Biennale, the Donaueschinger Musiktage, and the Darmstädter Ferienkurse. She is married to the composer Hans-Christian von Dadelsen, with whom she runs the publishing house Kodasi.

== Memberships ==
- 1999 Freie Akademie der Künste Hamburg

== Compositions (selection) ==
Includes material from the German-language Wikipedia version of this article

=== Orchestral works ===
- Radar (1987/88) for piano and orchestra
- Verhör (1989), on a text by Thomas Höft, for soprano, baritone, and orchestra
- Messe Française „La Partisane“ (1991) for alto, tenor, mixed chorus, and orchestra
- Al Fondo Negro (1993) for large orchestra
- You (1995/96) for string orchestra
- Inlines or Outlaws (2000) for guitar orchestra
- Blau (2002) for guitar orchestra
