= Lisa Streich =

Swedish composer (born 1985)

Lisa Streich (born 19 April 1985) is a Swedish composer of contemporary classical music. Motorised instruments and spectral chords characterize her works.

== Biography ==
Lisa Streich was born on 19 April 1985 in Norra Råda, Sweden. She grew up in Germany and studied composition and organ at the Berlin University of the Arts (2005–07), Royal College of Music, Stockholm (2007–10), Mozarteum in Salzburg (2008–09), Hochschule für Musik und Tanz Köln (2010–13) and IRCAM in Paris (2011–12). Teachers had been Johannes Schöllhorn and Adriana Hölszky.

Streich composed FALTER for violin for the 2021 ARD International Music Competition. Until 2023, she was scholarship recipient at the Norwegian Academy of Music, with Helmut Lachenmann as her mentor. In 2024, Streich has been composer-in-residence at the Lucerne Festival and Royal Stockholm Philharmonic Orchestra. She received commissions by the Berlin Philharmonic (ISHJÄRTA), Lucerne Festival (REIGEN), and NDR Elbphilharmonie Orchestra (FLÜGEL). The trumpet concerto MEDUSE was premiered in 2024 by the Royal Stockholm Philharmonic Orchestra. Streich's works are published by Ricordi Berlin.

Streich lives on Gotland, Sweden.

== Style ==
Streich composes music of contrasts, cold and hot is the contrast in ISHJÄRTA (Ice Heart). Streich uses electronics and prepares instruments with small motorised machines, that create a mechanical sound. For the first time in SEGEL (2017), she has been creating imperfect floating, unclear chords through spectral transformation, called spectral tonality. Alan Gilbert said in an interview: "She integrates the performers strongly into the creative composition process."

== Awards ==
- 2016/17 Villa Massimo
- 2017 Ernst von Siemens Composer Prize
- 2022 Heidelberger Künstlerinnenpreis (Heidelberg Prize for Female Artists)
- 2024 Hindemith Prize

== Works ==
=== Stage ===
- ...MIT BRENNENDEM ÖLE Pocket opera for 12 instruments, 5 female voices and 5 children's voices (2011), 12'

=== Concertante ===
- MEDUSE Elle est belle et elle rit. for trumpet and orchestra (2024), 20'
- JUBELHEMD Concerto Grosso for Quartet and Orchestra, Viola, Harp, Percussion/Drum kit, Trumpet (2021), 18'
- NEROLI for violin and orchestra (2021–2022), 20'
- LASTER for motorised piano and orchestra (2019), 20'
- AUGENLIDER for prepared guitar and orchestra (2015), 20'

=== Orchestral ===
- REIGEN for small orchestra (2024), 4'
- ISHJÄRTA for orchestra (2022–2023), 15'
- BALLHAUS for orchestra and props (2022), 24'
- FLÜGEL for orchestra (2020), 13'
- HÄNDEKÜSSEN for chamber orchestra (2019), 12'
- MANTEL for string orchestra (2018), 18'
- SEGEL for orchestra (2017), 13'
- ARK for wind orchestra, 5 percussionists and double bass (2016), 12'
- ALV for orchestra (2013), 8'

=== Ensemble ===
- REMEMORY for ensemble (2021–2022), 15'
- PEONY’S SONG for ensemble (2020), 16'
- OFELIA for ensemble (2022), 22'
- HIMMEL for ensemble (2021), 15'
- FRANCESCA for ensemble (2019), 25'
- ZUCKER for motorised ensemble (2016), 15'
- MARIA CALLAS for ensemble (2014), 3'
- MJÖLK for ensemble and ferris wheel (2014), 20'
- PAPIROSN for ensemble (2013), 14'
- ÄLV ALV ALVA for ensemble (2012), 20'
- PIETÀ for ensemble and pictures (2012), 9'
- GRATA for cello and ensemble (2011), 15'
- LAKALLES for ensemble and electronics (2009), 9'

=== Choral ===
- PREDELLA for four choirs and ensemble (2018), 13'
- CIVIL SONG for 32 voices (2018), 13'
- STABAT for 32 voices in four choirs (2017), 27'
- AGNEL for 12-part choir, objects, choirboy and electronics (2013), 13'
- ÄNGEN DANSAR for female choir and electronics (2009), 10'

=== Vocal ===
- FIKONTRÄDET for counter tenor and baroque ensemble (2016), 15'
- HALBWERTZEITEN UND HONIG for soprano, piano and piano-loudspeakers (2010), 12'
- WALLPAPERS for baritone and electronics (2010), 5'30"
- DER ZITRONENGELBE KLANG for baritone, soprano and tuba (2008), 8'

=== Chamber ===
- STERNENSTILL for string quartet (2020), 15'
- LAUB for violin, guitar and choir (2018), 15'
- FLEISCH for solo cello for 1–3 cellists (2017), 11'
- PIETÀ for motorised violoncello and ensemble (2015), 9'
- SAI BALLARE? for piano trio (2015), 8'
- NEBENSONNEN for clarinet and string trio (2015), 11'
- VOGEL. MEHR VOGEL (ALS ENGEL), for string quartet (2015), 10'
- (ENGEL, ... ) NOCH TASTEND, for string quartet (2015), 20'
- «DER ZARTE FADEN DEN DIE SCHÖNHEIT SPINNT», performance installation for percussion quartet (2014), 14'
- RUE CUVIER ou LES YEUX AU CIEL for cello and accordion (2014), 15'
- SERAPH for cello and organ (2013), 15'
- SAI BALLARE? for violin, piano and motorised violoncello or piano trio (2013), 8'
- ASCHE for cello and clarinet (2012), 15'
- MADONNA DEL PRATO for saxophone quartet (2012), 9'
- PLAY TIME for bicycle and percussion trio (2012), 10'
- PIETÀ for cello, motors and electronics (2012), 7'20"
- ASKARGOT for string quartet (2011), 8'
- ASKAR for string quartet and electronics (2010), 9'30"

=== Instrumental ===
- PIETÀ for solo motorised violoncello and motorised installation of piano, violoncello, violin and guitar (2018), 8'
- MINERVA for baroque cello (2018), 8'
- SAFRAN for violin and motorised piano (2017), 14'
- EXISTENSER for piano and electronics (2009), 10'
- NÄCKEN for violin and electronics (2008), 10'23"

=== Electronics ===
- PLAYNG BERLIN for electronics (2007), 2'30"
- VON DEN SIEBEN PLAGEN for electronics (2008), 7'

== Recordings ==
- Streich, Lisa; Mayrhofer, Gregor A.; Seidl, Niklas; Metternich, Eberhard; Donati, Lorenzo; Vokalensemble Kölner Dom; ensemble recherche (2018), Pietà (in German), Mainz: Wergo, OCLC 1056140802
- Streich, Lisa (2019), Augenlider (in no linguistic content), [Vienna]: Kairos, OCLC 1117708972
- Janárčeková, Viera; Streich, Lisa; Asasello Quartett (2020), Insights to-morrow : works by Viera Janárčeková, Márton Illés and Lisa Streich (in no linguistic content), Genuin, OCLC 1154625942
- Ensemble Modern (2017), Luciano Berio, Lisa Streich, Karlheinz Stockhausen, Torsten Herrmann Auditorium Parco della Musica, Sala Santa Cecilia, 22 maggio 2017 (in no linguistic content), OCLC 1075210904
