= Samy Moussa =

Canadian conductor and composer

Samy Moussa (born June 1, 1984) is a Canadian conductor and composer of classical music, living in Berlin. His works have been performed internationally.

== Early life and education ==
Moussa was born and grew up in Montreal. He completed his undergraduate studies at the Université de Montréal with José Evangelista and postgraduate studies at University of Music and Performing Arts Munich with Matthias Pintscher and Pascal Dusapin, also participating in conducting master classes with Pierre Boulez, Péter Eötvös, and Royaumont Voix Nouvelles courses with Salvatore Sciarrino.

== Career ==
In 2010, Moussa became music director of the INDEX Ensemble in Munich, and since that time worked with a number of ensembles and orchestras among which were: MDR Leipzig Radio Symphony Orchestra, hr-Sinfonieorchester, CBC Radio Orchestra, Vancouver Symphony Orchestra and Hamilton Philharmonic Orchestra among others.

He conducted the premiere of his second opera, Vastation, with a libretto by Toby Litt, at the Munich Biennale in 2014.

His first symphony, titled Concordia, was premiered by Kent Nagano conducting the Montreal Symphony Orchestra in May 2017. That year the Dallas Symphony Orchestra gave the United States premiere of his work A Globe Itself Infolding for organ and orchestra, which had previously been premiered and recorded by the Montreal Symphony Orchestra.

In 2013, Moussa won the Ernst von Siemens Composer Prize. In 2017, he received the Hindemith Prize. In 2018, the German government awarded him a fellowship at Villa Massimo in Rome.

Moussa composed the music for Julian Rosefeldt's film installation Euphoria, which premiered at the Ruhrtriennale in 2022, and which received subsequent productions at the Park Avenue Armory the same year, and at the Holland Festival and RISING in Melbourne in 2023.

In 2021, the Vienna Philharmonic Orchestra, conducted by Christian Thielemann, gave the world premiere of Moussa's Elysium. In 2023, trombonist Jörgen van Rijen gave the premiere of his Trombone Concerto "Yericho" with the Orchestre national de Lyon. In 2024, the Dutch National Opera gave the premiere of his oratorio Antigone for women's chorus and orchestra, sung in Ancient Greek. He was named composer-in-residence of the Helsinki Philharmonic Orchestra for the 2024-2025 season. In 2025, flautist Emmanuel Pahud gave the premiere of his Flute Concerto with the Orchestre national de France.
