= Hans-Jürgen von Bose =

German composer

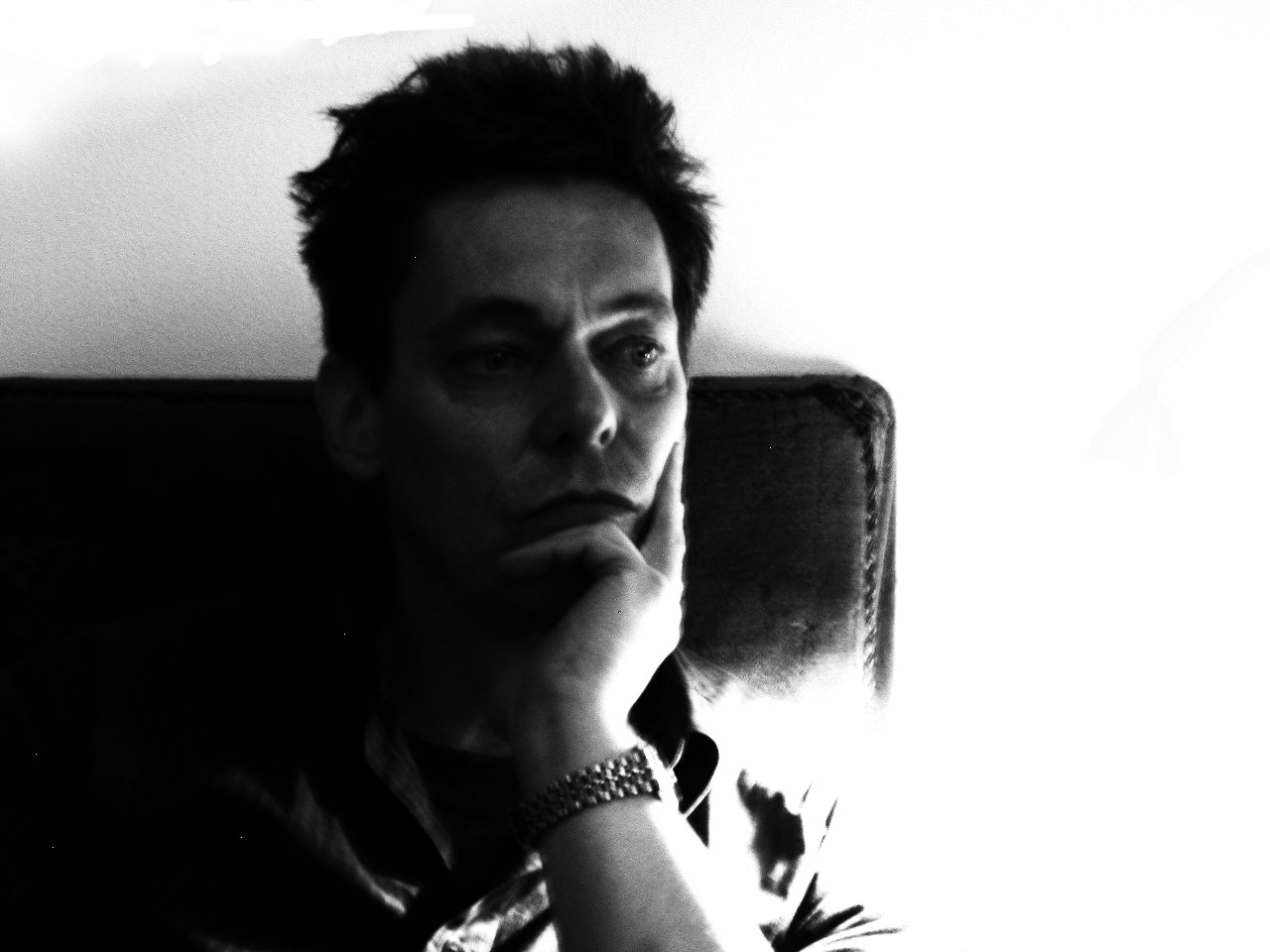
- Born: 24 December 1953 (age 72); Munich, Bavaria, Germany
- Education: Frankfurt University of Music and Performing Arts
- Occupation: Composer
- Organizations: Theater Lübeck; Radiophilharmonie Hannover; Düsseldorf Symphony Orchestra; Staatsphilharmonie Rheinland-Pfalz
- Awards: Villa Massimo; German Critics Prize; Schneider-Schott Music Prize; Ernst von Siemens Music Prize; Prize of the Christoph and Stephan Kaske Foundation

Hans-Jürgen von Bose (born 24 December 1953) is a German composer.

== Life ==
After an unsettled adolescence, Bose entered the Hoch Conservatory in Frankfurt in 1969, where he received instruction in piano and music theory. Upon graduating from the conservatory, he studied composition (under Hans Ulrich Engelmann), piano (under Klaus Billing), and conducting at the Frankfurt University of Music and Performing Arts. After attending the Darmstädter Ferienkurse in 1974 and the premiere of his First String Quartet, he was awarded several scholarships, among others from the Mozart Foundation and the German National Academic Foundation. In 1976, Bose dropped his studies in Frankfurt and settled in Munich as a freelance artist. The following works like Morphogenesis (1976), Das Diplom (1976), Die Nacht aus Blei (1981), 63: Dream Palace (1990), among others.

He received numerous grants and awards, including:

- German Academy Rome Villa Massimo (1980/1985)
- German Critics Prize (1981)
- Schneider-Schott Music Prize, Mainz (1988)
- Ernst von Siemens Music Prize (1994)
- Prize of the Christoph and Stephan Kaske Foundation for the recognition of Bose's educational merits (1998)

He received commissions from renowned orchestras and opera houses including Idyllen (1982/83) for the Berlin Philharmonic. In the 1980s, Bose became a member of the jury of the "Summer Music Festival Hitzacker" as well as a lecturer at the "Young Composers' Meeting" in Weikersheim. After a visiting professorship for composition at the Salzburg Mozarteum he succeeded Wilhelm Killmayer as professor of composition at the University of Music and Theater in Munich in 1992 (until 2007). Now he is teaching again at University of Music and Theater in Munich since 2012.

Hans-Jürgen von Bose moved in 2011 from Berlin to Zorneding near Munich.

== Work ==
Hans-Jürgen von Bose's early works are characterized by the juxtaposition and interlocking of structural and public sound elements. Surmounting serial methods of composition and advocating a subjective semantics designated as the "New Simplicity" starting with the Darmstadt Summer Courses in 1978 (this was also true for other composers such as Wolfgang Rihm and Detlev Müller-Siemens), the connotations of this term could not cover the structure and complex treatment of time of their compositions. In its consensus against serial constructive thinking, the trend known in the 1970s by the catchphrase "New Subjectivity", gave significant impulses for a new concept of material by turning away from an objective understanding of them.

The label "New Simplicity" was misapplied to Bose's works starting with the String Trio of 1978, though it does point to the presence of an important, though intimate and concealed semantic dimension in his works which can be directly experienced. Beginning in 1989 with the opera 63: Dream Palace, Bose has enriched the process of temporal layering and serial organization characteristic of his music, in a spirit of reflective postmodernism, by borrowing stylistic elements from the past and present.

He wrote the libretto for 63: Dream Palace himself after the novella by James Purdy. It was premiered at the second Munich Biennale in 1990. The heterogeneity of post-modernism is processed through the different reflected styles. A highlight of this period is the opera Slaughterhouse V (1996), whose libretto is based on the novel Slaughterhouse 5, or the children's crusade, by Kurt Vonnegut.

== Slaughterhouse V ==
=== Post-structuralism ===
The French philosophy and its theory of "Death of the Author" (Roland Barthes) make this its influence significantly, as the "personal style" of Bose as a "hopefully soon to be overcome relic of the 19th Century".

Significant for Bose's creativity in general, and Slaughterhouse 5 in particular, is the treatment of temporal complexity. The linear understanding of time is replaced by simultaneity, zeitspastischen analogous to the understanding of the protagonist Billy Pilgrim. Bose also permits the findings from the chaos theory, neurobiology and astrophysics polymorphic in his understanding of time are introduced, through the music out into the structuring of the libretto were implemented. Sergei Eisenstein established form of the film will be cut here – even composition – used so that different levels of "fast and hard against geschnitten" can be used in compositional layering and continued interweaving. The composer speaks in this context of a "time-palimpsest".

The opera was created as a work commissioned by the Bavarian State Opera and opened in 1996 the Munich Opera Festival (directed by Eike Gramss de:Eike Gramss).

== Compositions ==
=== Vocal music ===
- Three Songs for tenor and chamber orchestra (1977)
- Symphonic Fragment (Hölderlin) (1979/80)
- Guarda el canto (Miguel Ángel Bustos) – Four fragments in three movements for soprano and string quartet (1981)
- Sappho Songs for mezzo-soprano and chamber orchestra (1983)
- Sonnet XLII for baritone and string quartet (Shakespeare, 1985)
- Five nursery rhymes – from "Des Knaben Wunderhorn" for alto and five instruments (1985)
- ... Spoken in the Wind – spiritual music for solo soprano, two spokesmen (1985)
- Omega – Five Poems of Federico García Lorca for mezzo-soprano and piano (1986)
- Todesfuge – mixed choir with baritone solo and organ (1989)
- Love after Love – (D. Walcott) for soprano and orchestra (1990/91)
- The Trip to the Mountains – Franz Kafka, for counter-tenor and piano (2005)
- Kafka Cycle for countertenor and cello, dedicated to Aribert Reimann on his 70th birthday (2006)
- Lamento and Dithyrambus (I. Bachmann) for counter tenor, keyboard, piano and tubular bells, dedicated to Hans-Werner Henze on his 80th birthday (2006)
- Bernhard Cycle – three songs to poems by Thomas Bernhard, for soprano and piano (2006)
- Invocation Cycle for countertenor and organ (2008)

=== Stage works ===
- Blood (Ramon del Valle-Inclan) – opera in 1 act (1974)
- The Night of Lead – kinetic action in six pictures by Hans Henny Jahnn (1981)
- Chimera – music scene by Federico García Lorca (1986)
- The Sorrows of Young Werther – lyric scene in two parts and an interlude (1987/88)
- Werther scenes – ballet in two parts and an interlude (1988)
- 63: Dream Palace – opera based on novel by James Purdy (1989)
- Medea Fragment – music by Hans Henny Jahnn (1993)
- Slaughterhouse V – opera, libretto by the composer after Kurt Vonnegut (1995)
- K-project 12/14 – musical theater after Kafka's The Metamorphosis (2002)

=== Instrumental music ===
- Morphogenisis for large orchestra (1975)
- Travesty in a Sad Landscape – variations for chamber orchestra (1978)
- Music for a House Full Time for large chamber orchestra (1978)
- Idylls – for the centenary of the Berlin Symphony Orchestra (1982/83)
- Symbolum for organ and orchestra (1985)
- 1 Maze for large orchestra. (1987)
- Concertino per il HWH for chamber orchestra (1991)
- Maze II for piano (1992)

=== Chamber music ===
- String Quartet No. 1 (1973)
- String Quartet No. 2 (1976–1977)
- String Trio (1978)
- ... vom Wege abkommen for viola solo (1981–1982)
- String Quartet No. 3 (1986–1987)
- Three Epitaphs for brass sextet (1987)
- Music for Cello Solo– (2002)
- Music for K for violin, cello and piano (2002)
- String Trio (2006), commissioned by the Bavarian State Opera to 80. Geburtstag by Hans-Werner Henze

=== Piano music ===
- Three – small piano pieces (1982)
- Labyrinth II (1987)
- Origami, 2 episodes for piano 4-hands (1991)

== Publications ==
- Search for a new ideal of beauty. In: E. Thomas, holiday courses '78. (= Darmstadt contributions to New Music 17)
- "Mit der Zeit springt gegen die Langeweile. Schlachthaus 5: Ein Plädoyer für die moderne Oper". In "Theater ist ein Traumort": Opern des 20. Jahrhunderts von Janáček bis Widmann, edited by Hanspeter Krellmann and Jürgen Schläder, 350–54. Berlin: Henschel, 2005. ISBN 3-89487-505-4.

== References and footnotes ==
- Bose, Hans-Jürgen von. 2005. "Mit der Zeit springt gegen die Langeweile. Schlachthaus 5: Ein Plädoyer für die moderne Oper". In "Theater ist ein Traumort": Opern des 20. Jahrhunderts von Janáček bis Widmann, edited by Hanspeter Krellmann and Jürgen Schläder, 350–54. Berlin: Henschel. ISBN 3-89487-505-4.
- Mauser, Siegfried. 2001. "Bose, Hans-Jürgen von". The New Grove Dictionary of Music and Musicians, second edition, edited by Stanley Sadie and John Tyrrell. London: Macmillan Publishers.
