= Alex Paxton =

British composer and trombonist (born 1990)

- Born: 1990 (age 35–36); Manchester, England
- Origin: London, England
- Genres: Contemporary classical, jazz
- Occupations: Composer, musician
- Instrument: Trombone
- Years active: 2014-present
- Labels: NMC Recordings, Delphian Records
- Website: alexpaxtonmusic.com

Alex Paxton (born 1990) is an English composer and trombonist known for his maximalist compositions that often incorporate elements of jazz, baroque music and new complexity.

== Education and career ==
Paxton studied jazz trombone performance at the Royal Academy of Music before receiving an MMus in composition from the Royal College of Music.

As a trombone soloist he has performed with orchestras such as the London Sinfonietta, Ensemble Modern, Philharmonia Orchestra, and Royal Scottish National Orchestra.

As a composer, his music has been performed by the London Symphony Orchestra, Danish National Symphony Orchestra, London Sinfonietta, and the WDR Symphony.

In 2021, his piece Sometimes Voices won an Ivor Novello Award. He was also nominated for an Ivor in 2022 for Best Composition for Chamber Ensemble for his piece Music for Bosch People and in 2023 for Best Large Ensemble Composition for his piece ilolli-pop.

Paxton was selected as the winner of the 2023 Hindemith Prize at the Schleswig-Holstein Music Festival.

Paxton's debut record Music for Bosch People was released by NMC Recordings in 2021 and his record Happy Music for Orchestra was released by Delphian Records in 2023.

Paxton is a composition professor at Trinity Laban Conservatoire of Music and Dance.
