= Wien Modern =

Modern music festival in Vienna, Austria

Wien Modern is a modern music festival in Vienna, Austria that was founded by Claudio Abbado in 1988. It was created with the intent of revitalizing the traditional music scene of Vienna. Friedrich Cerha, Johannes Maria Staud, Mark Andre, Wolfgang Mitterer, Olga Neuwirth, Peter Eötvös, Roger Woodward and Georg Friedrich Haas have been featured at the festival since its inception.
