= Jörn Arnecke =

German composer

Jörn Arnecke (born 1973, in Hameln) is a German composer. Arnecke is the professor of music theory, aural training, and historical music theory at the Hochschule für Musik Franz Liszt, Weimar.

== Life ==
Arnecke studied composition and musical theory in Hamburg, Germany, at the Academy for Music and Theatre (Hochschule für Musik und Theater Hamburg) under Volkhardt Preuß and Peter Michael Hamel. In 1997/98, during his study, he was a student of Gérard Grisey at the Conservatoire National Superieur in Paris. Arnecke graduated in 2000 and since 2001 he has been part-time professor at the music academy in Hamburg. 2004 he was given a scholarship by the Bundeskünstlerförderung (federal artist support) for the Deutsches Studienzentrum in Venice and in 2007 one for Casa Baldi near Rome. During his studies and later on he has won many prizes, for example the Preis des Landesverbandes Sachen des Deutschen Tonträgerverbandes in 1999.

== Major works ==
=== Opera ===
- Ariadne (1999)

opera scene, recited poems: Paul Heyse, Adelbert von Chamisso & Joseph von Eichendorff, written for the Munich Biennale, dedicated to Peter Michael Hamel

- Le Nozze di Figaro (1999)

Opera by W. A. Mozart, arrangement for 12 instruments

- Das Fest im Meer (2001/02)

musical theatre in 3 sections by Francis Hüsers, from John Bergers novel "To the Wedding", written for Hamburgische Staatsoper (national opera Hamburg)

- Butterfly Blues (2004)

musical theatre in 8 scenes after the play by Henning Mankell, German lyrics: Claudia Romeder; written for Hamburgische Staatsoper

- Unter Eis (2006/07)

musical theatre in 13 scenes, libretto: Falk Richter; written for Ruhr Triennale in cooperation with Oper Frankfurt

=== Orchestra ===
- Nachtferne (1996)
- Frage (1997/98)

awarded the Förderpreis des Göttinger Symphonie Orchesters

- Folie (2000)

written for Festival junger Künstler Bayreuth, dedicated to Sissy Thammer & Professor Siegfried Palm

- Gezeiten (Tides) (2005)

fantasia for orchestra, written for Theater und Philharmonisches Orchester Heidelberg

- Auf dem Wasser zu singen (2005/06)

seven songs after Franz Schubert und Johannes Brahms for tenor & 18 strings, belongs to 9 Intermezzi "Zwischen den Wassern", lyrics: Friedrich Leopold zu Stollberg, Heinrich Heine, Wilhelm Müller, August von Platen, Robert Reinick & Johann Wolfgang von Goethe

- Zwischen den Wassern (2005/06)

9 intermezzi for 18 strings

- Kristallisationen (2007/08)

for clarinet, bassoon & orchestra, written for Philharmonisches Staatsorchester Hamburg

=== Ensemble ===
- Erstarrungen (2000)

for soprano, speaker & chamber orchestra, lyrics: Wilhelm Müller & Rainer Kunze, written for Expo 2000

- Äther (2006)

for soprano & chamber ensemble, lyrics: Hannah Dübgen, written for Ilse und Dr. Horst Rusch-Stiftung and the Scharoun Ensemble

=== Chamber music ===
- Einstimmig zweistimmig (1996)

for 2 oboes

- Kreuzspiel (1996/97)

for flute

- Strophen zum Wir (1998)

after Rainer Maria Rilke

- In Stille – string quartet Nr. 1 (2002)

written for Bayerische Staatsoper Munich

- Inschriften – string quartet Nr. 2 (2003)

written for Tonhalle Düsseldorf

- Weißer Rauch (2003)

for clarinet

- Schwerelos (2000/2005)

3 pieces for harp

- Alea/Talea – trio for piano Nr. 1 (2005/06)

written for Musikgemeinde Harburg
