= Philipp Maintz =

German composer (born 1977)

- Born: 28 February 1977 (age 48); Aachen, Germany
- Education: Maastricht Academy of Music
- Occupation: Composer
- Awards: Ernst von Siemens Composers' Prize; Villa Massimo

Philipp Maintz (born 28 February 1977, in Aachen) is a German composer.

== Career ==
Maintz studied composition with Michael Reudenbach and Robert HP Platz, and electronic music with Karlheinz Essl. He studied further at the CRFMW (Centre de Recherches et de Formations Musicales de Wallonie) of the University of Liège and the IRCAM (Institut des Recherches et Coordinations Musicales). He received the Ernst von Siemens Composer Prize in 2005. He was granted a scholarship from the Federal Government for the Cité internationale des arts in Paris. In 2010 he was a Stipendiat of the Villa Massimo.

His opera Maldoror on a libretto by Thomas Fiedler after Les Chants de Maldoror by Comte de Lautréamont was premiered at the Munich Biennale in 2010.

His works have been performed at the Wittener Tage für neue Kammermusik, the Salzburg Festival, among others. Artists have included the Arditti String Quartet, the Ensemble intercontemporain, das Kammerensemble Neue Musik Berlin, the Radio-Sinfonieorchester Stuttgart with Lothar Zagrosek, and the BBC Symphony Orchestra with Pierre-André Valade.

== Discography ==
- hängende gärten / tríptico vertical, on: Philipp Maintz – Orchestra Works Vol.1, NEOS 2018 (NEOS 11712)
- trawl / NAHT / und düsteren auges, blutbesprengt, on: Ensemble Alternance: Philipp Maintz – TRAWL, Stradivarius 2018 (STR 37080)
- fluchtlinie / NAHT / tourbillon / ferner, und immer ferner / wenn steine sich gen himmel stauen, on: Portrait Philipp Maintz, WERGO 2013 (WER 6589)
- gelände/zeichnung, on: Jan Gerdes: Gelände/Zeichnung – Piano, Edition Zeitklang 2008 (ez 26028)
