= Hanspeter Kyburz =

Swiss composer (born 1960)

Hanspeter Kyburz (born 8 July 1960) is a contemporary Swiss composer of classical music, known for applying electronic music techniques to his productions.

== Career ==
Kyburz was born in Lagos, Nigeria to Swiss parents. In 1980, he began studying music composition, first in Graz with A. Dobrowolsky and Gösta Neuwirth, then, from 1982–1990, with Gösta Neuwirth and Frank Michael Beyer at the Universität der Künste in Berlin, later with Hans Zender in Frankfurt. In 1990, he received the Boris Blacher Prize and won a Cité internationale des arts scholarship for 1990/91 in Paris.

In 1991, Kyburz began collaborating with the Insel-Musik-Konzerte group in Berlin. His study of music theory as well as the philosophy and history of art assured him acquisition of the Magistertitels title.

He was awarded the Schneider-Schott Music Prize in 1996, and the Förderpreis Prize from the Berlin Akademie der Künste in 1994.

He has held lectures on electronic music production in Germany, Austria and Switzerland, and in 1996 he participated as a guest lecturer on the subject of the Basler composer week. As a composer, he is by performances with the citizens of Berlin Biennale, Wiener Festwochen (Vienna's week-long musical festival), the Wittener Tage für neue Kammermusik and in Donaueschingen.

Kyburz has led such internationally renowned ensembles such as Klangforum in Vienna, Ensemble Contrechamps in Geneva, Ensemble Intercontemporain in Paris, musikfabrik North Rhine-Westphalia, Ensemble Modern, Ensemble für Neue Musik in Zürich, Ensemble UnitedBerlin, Camerata Quartett in Warsaw and ensemble recherche in Freiburg. CD recordings have documented his work.

Hanspeter Kyburz wrote for the Ensemble Intercontemporain in Paris. He has also performed for Südwestfunk Radio in Baden-Baden, the Konservatorium in Basel and the Steirischen Herbst, the Schleswig-Holstein Musik Festival, Sender Freies Berlin and the Süddeutscher Rundfunk. Since 1997, Kyburz has served as professor for composition at the Hochschule für Musik "Hanns Eisler" in Berlin.

Kyburz produced a piece that is a musical interpretation of the enigmatic Voynich Manuscript.

== Recent activities ==
On 1 September 2006 Simon Rattle and the Berlin Philharmonic, performed the London Premiere of Noesis as part of the Promenade Concert season at London's Royal Albert Hall.

== Works ==
(Not complete)

- Malstrom, SWR-SO Baden-Baden & Freiburg/Zender
- The Voynich Cipher Manuscript, Südfunk-Chor Stuttgart/Klangforum Wien/Huber
- Parts, Klangforum Wien/Rundel
- Cells; Danse aveugle pour six instruments (1997)
- Double Points Plus
- A travers (1999)
- Noesis (2001–2003)
- Cells for saxophone quartet and Ensemble (1993/94)
- Danse aveugle for five instruments (1996/97)
- Diptychon for two chamber ensembles (1997/98)
- Piano concerto (1999/2000, rev. 2010)
- Reseaux for Sextet (2003–2007)
- String quartet (2003/04)
- Projektion for Solo-Ensemble and Orchestra (2004/05)
- touché for Soprano, Tenor and Orchestra, Text: Sabine Marienberg (2006)
- Abendlied for tenor and piano, Text: Sabine Marienberg (2007)
- quasi a due for piano with two or four hands (2010)

== Sources ==
- Biography at hfm-berlin.de
- Hanspeter Kyburz at IMDb
- Bio at ircam.fr
- Hanspeter Kyburz Operabase
