= Munich Biennale =

Opera and music theatre festival in Germany

The Munich Biennale (German: Münchener Biennale) is a contemporary opera and music theatre festival in the city of Munich. The full German name is Internationales Festival für neues Musiktheater, literally: International Festival for New Music Theater. The biennial festival was created in 1988 by Hans Werner Henze and is held in even-numbered years over 2–3 weeks in the late spring. The festival concentrates on world premieres of theater-related contemporary music, with a particular focus on commissioning first operas from young composers.

== History ==
=== Hans Werner Henze's artistic directorship (1988–1996) ===
Henze, himself a prolific composer of operas, described the genesis of the festival like this:

The whole story started with a query from the departmental head of the (Munich) cultural office ... whether I ... would be interested in considering creating some sort of civic music festival in Munich. After a period of time I suggested organizing something that had been lacking up until that point, something that also did not exist anywhere else in the world and yet was an urgent necessity – namely, a place where the young generation of composers interested in theatre ... could realize their ideas.

Henze curated the first four festivals, from 1988 to 1994, and established the general format of most of the festivals that followed. Short runs of the premiered operas are preceded by talks and additional concerts from the featured composers, to introduce the audiences to their ideas and music. See also Klangspuren.

=== Peter Ruzicka's artistic directorship (1996–2014) ===
Peter Ruzicka took over as artistic director ("one of the most influential administrative/ artistic positions in the European music-theatre scene") in 1996, with that year's biennale being jointly curated by Henze. Ruzicka broadened the scope of the works presented, with more emphasis on works using multimedia, and moving away from the text-based sources that characterised the period curated by Henze.

=== Manos Tsangaris and Daniel Ott's artistic directorship (2016–2024) ===
The composers Manos Tsangaris and Daniel Ott took over as joint artistic directors of the Biennale, starting in 2016. Their approach to curation further expanded the festival's remit beyond opera, to reflect an 'expanded composition term' and the 'open field' of new music theatre which spans '[f]rom new opera to scenic installation, from minimalized artistic interventions in municipal spaces to composed performance'.

=== Katrin Beck and Manuela Kerer's artistic directorship (2026–) ===
Katrin Beck and Manuela Kerer took over as joint artistic directors of the Biennale, starting in 2026.

== Operas given at the Munich Biennale ==
World premieres are marked as WP

Premiere		Composer	Title	Libretto and source
29 May 1988	WP	Detlev Glanert	Leyla und Medjnun	Aras Ören and Peter Schneider, after the epic poem by Nizami
3 Jun 1988	WP	Gerd Kühr	Stallerhof	Franz Xaver Kroetz, after his own play
4 Jun 1988	WP	Adriana Hölszky	Bremer Freiheit	Thomas Körner (librettist), after the play by Rainer Werner Fassbinder
17 Jun 1988	WP	Mark-Anthony Turnage	Greek	the composer and Jonathan Moore, after the play by Steven Berkoff
26 Apr 1990	WP	András Hamary	Seid still	José Vera Morales, after the play Tóték by István Örkény
28 Apr 1990	WP	Wolfgang von Schweinitz	Patmos	D. E. Sattler, after the Apocalypse of St John in Martin Luther's translation
6 May 1990	WP	Hans-Jürgen von Bose	63: Dream Palace	the composer, after the novella by James Purdy
14 May 1990	WP	Michèle Reverdy	Le Précepteur	Hans-Ulrich Treichel, after the play Der Hofmeister by Jakob Michael Reinhold Lenz
7 May 1992		Violeta Dinescu	Eréndira	Monika Rothmaier, after the story The Incredible and Sad Tale of Innocent Eréndira and Her Heartless Grandmother by Gabriel García Márquez
29 Apr 1992	WP	Jorge Liderman	Antigona Furiosa	the composer, after the drama by Griselda Gambaro
27 May 1992		Giorgio Battistelli	Teorema	the composer, loosely after the film by Pier Paolo Pasolini
16 May 1992	WP	Gerhard Stäbler	Sünde.Fall.Beil	Andreas Lechner, after the drama Catherine Howard by Alexandre Dumas père
22 May 1992		Param Vir	Broken Strings	David Rudkin, after the Buddhist story Guttil Jatak
22 May 1992		Param Vir	Snatched by the Gods	William Radice, after the poem Debatar Gras by Rabindranath Tagore
1 May 1994	WP	Tania León	Scourge of Hyacinths	the composer, after the radio play by Wole Soyinka
19 May 1994	WP	Benedict Mason	Playing Away	Howard Brenton
4 Dec 1996	WP	Michael Obst	Solaris	the composer, after the novel by Stanislaw Lem
9 Dec 1996	WP	Hanna Kulenty	The Mother of Black-Winged Dreams	Paul Goodwin
14 Apr 1997	WP	Roderick Watkins	The Juniper Tree	Patricia Debney, after the folk tale by the Brothers Grimm
19 Apr 1998	WP	Toshio Hosokawa	Vision of Lear	Tadashi Suzuki, after his stage play The Tale of Lear
21 Apr 1998	WP	Sandeep Bhagwati	Ramanujan	the composer, after the life of Indian mathematician Srinivasa Ramanujan (1887–1920)
25 Apr 1998	WP	Jan Müller-Wieland	Komödie ohne Titel	the composer, after the drama Comedia sin título by Federico García Lorca
19 Apr 1999	WP	Mauricio Sotelo	De Amore	Peter Mussbach
10 May 2000	WP	Chaya Czernowin	Pnima ... ins Innere	
27 Apr 2002	WP	André Werner	Marlowe: Der Jude von Malta	the composer, after the play The Jew of Malta by Christopher Marlowe
3 May 2002	WP	Manfred Stahnke	Orpheus Kristall	Simone Homem de Mello
12 May 2004	WP	Johannes Maria Staud	Berenice	Durs Grünbein, after Edgar Allan Poe
25 May 2004	WP	Brian Ferneyhough	Shadowtime	Charles Bernstein
9 May 2006	WP	Aureliano Cattaneo	La Philosophie dans le labyrinthe	Edoardo Sanguineti, after the Greek myth of the Minotaur
18 May 2006	WP	José María Sánchez-Verdú	GRAMMA	the composer
17 Apr 2008	WP	Enno Poppe	Arbeit Nahrung Wohnung	Marcel Beyer, loosely after the novel Robinson Crusoe by Daniel Defoe
18 Apr 2008	WP	Klaus Lang	Die Architektur des Regens	after the Noh play Shiga by Zeami (c1363–c1443)
23 Apr 2008	WP	Carola Bauckholt	hellhörig	(none)
30 Apr 2008	WP	Jens Joneleit	Piero – Ende der Nacht	Michael Herrschel, loosely after the novel Die Rote by Alfred Andersch
27 Apr 2010	WP	Philipp Maintz	Maldoror	Thomas Fiedler, after Les Chants de Maldoror by Comte de Lautréamont
28 Apr 2010	WP	Márton Illés	Die weiße Fürstin	after the first draft of the dramatic poem by Rainer Maria Rilke
5 May 2010	WP	Klaus Schedl	Tilt	Roland Quitt, after the diary of Sir Walter Raleigh
5 May 2010	WP	Tato Taborda	Der Einsturz des Himmels	Roland Quitt, after the book La Chute du Ciel by Davi Kopenawa and Bruce Albert
5 May 2010	WP	Ludger Brummer (web)	In Erwartung	Peter Weibel
9 May 2010	WP	Lin Wang	Die Quelle	the composer and Can Xue, after a story "the Double Life" by Can Xue
3 May 2012	WP	Sarah Nemtsov	L'Absence	the composer, after Livre des Questions by Edmond Jabès
5 May 2012	WP	Eunyoung Esther Kim (web)	Mama Dolorosa	Yona Kim
16 May 2012	WP	Arnulf Herrmann	Wasser	Nico Bleutge (lyrics)
7 May 2014	WP	Marko Nikodijević	Vivier	Gunther Geltinger, after the life and death of Claude Vivier
8 May 2014	WP	Samy Moussa (web)	Vastation	Toby Litt
11 May 2014		Claude Vivier	Kopernikus	opéra-rituel de mort, libretto by the composer
17 May 2014	WP	Dieter Schnebel	Utopien	
22 May 2014	WP	Hèctor Parra	Das geopferte Leben	Marie NDiaye

== Significance ==
The Munich Biennale has provided first or early commissions for stage works from many composers now established as opera composers, such as Mark-Anthony Turnage, Detlev Glanert, Gerd Kühr, Hans-Jürgen von Bose, Param Vir, Toshio Hosokawa and Violeta Dinescu.

The strongly international scope of the festival has meant that it has been able to offer opportunities missing at a national level.
