= Ulrich Stranz =

German teacher and composer

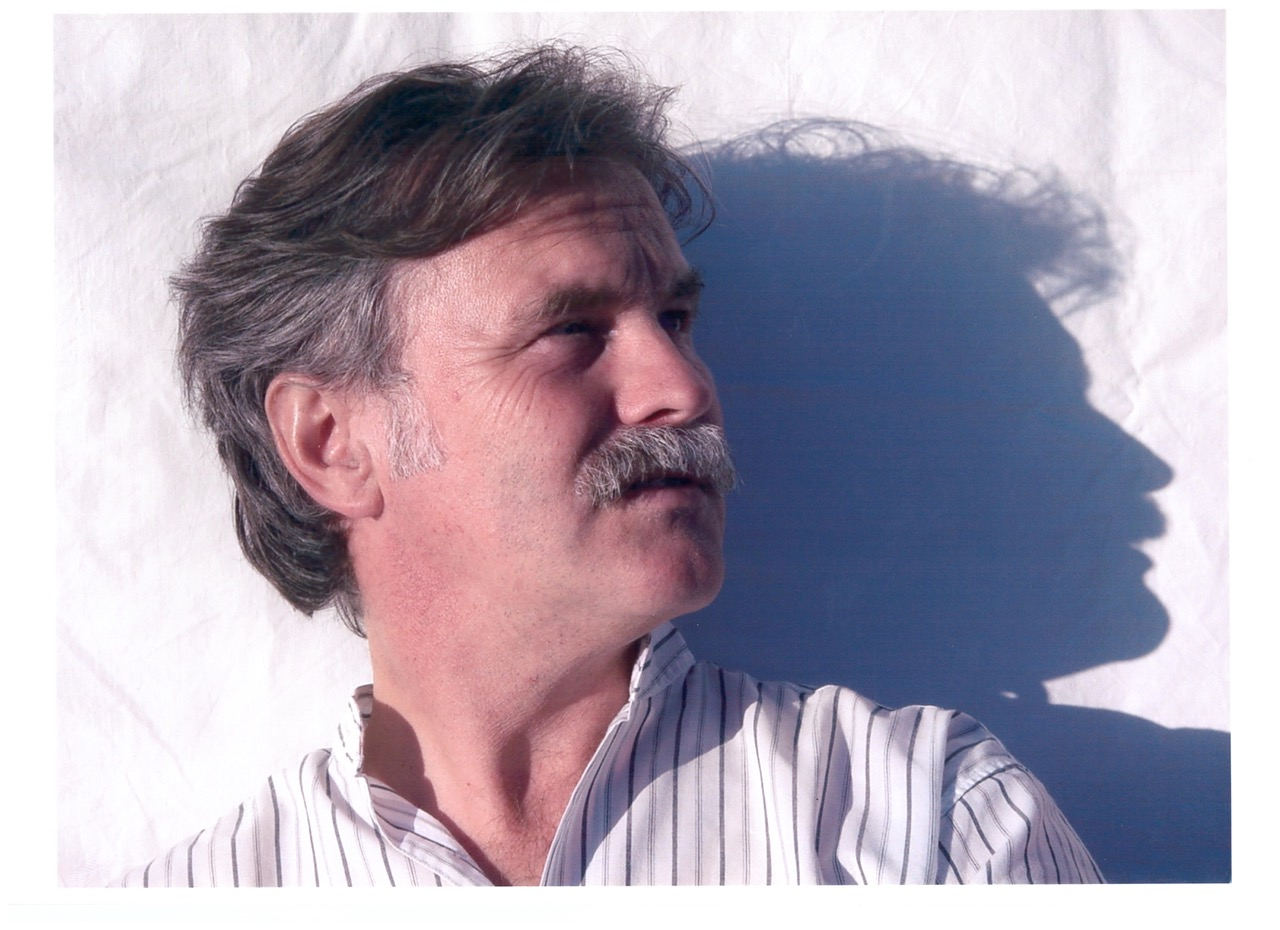
- Born: 10 May 1946 (age 79); Neumarkt-Sankt Veit
- Died: 27 April 2004 (aged 57); Munich
- Education: Musikhochschule München
- Occupations: Teacher; Composer
- Awards: Villa Massimo; Kranichsteiner Musikpreis; Schneider-Schott Music Prize

Ulrich Stranz (10 May 1946 – 27 April 2004) was a German teacher and composer.

== Life ==
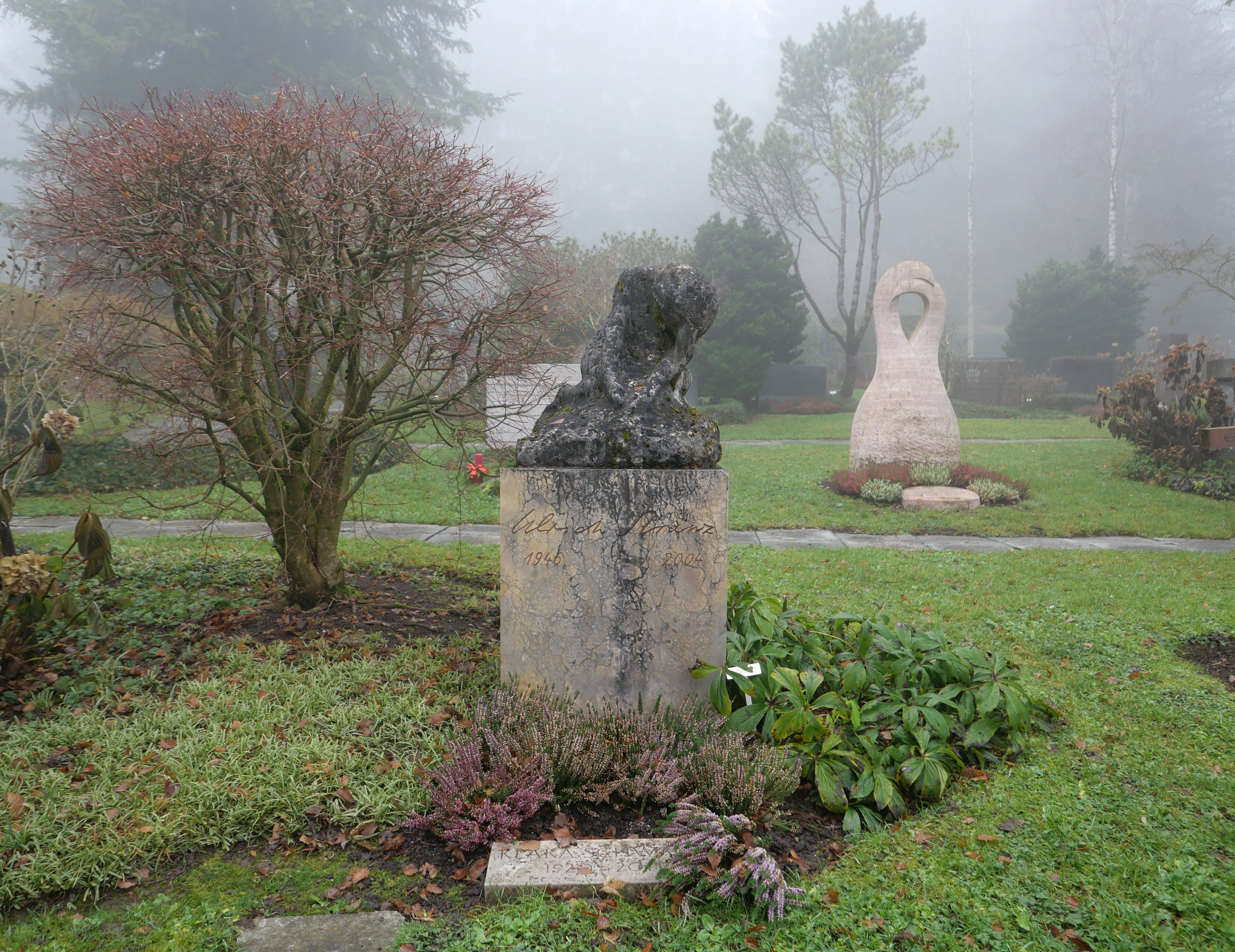
The grave of Stranz.

Born in Neumarkt-Sankt Veit, Upper Bavaria, Stranz grew up in Munich, obtaining the Abitur at the Musisches Gymnasium in 1966. He studied composition with Fritz Büchtger from 1965 to 1968, who taught him music theory, forming of melodies (Melodiebildung), counterpoint, and a twelve tone system with esoteric and anthroposophical background. He studied at the Musikhochschule München from 1968 to 1972, violin with Heinz Endres, and Günter Bialas. Bialas initiated a series Musik der Zeit (Contemporary music), which gave Stranz the opportunity of public performances.

Stranz spent two years at the electronic studio in Utrecht, by the German Academic Exchange Service. In 1974, he settled in Zürich, where he worked as a teacher and composer. In 1980/81, he spent half a year on a scholarship at the Villa Massimo in Rome. Stranz died in Zürich shortly before his 58th birthday of cancer. He was buried at the Fluntern Cemetery.

== Work ==
Compositions by Stranz include orchestral, ensemble and chamber music. His four string quartets became especially famous. His works were published by Bärenreiter Verlag, and recorded by Wergo and telos.

Stranz developed his own musical style during his studies with Bialas. His compositions focus on single tones and single phrases, aiming for a combination of inspiration and construction. He used this intimate approach (Innigkeit dieses Ansatzes) in the orchestral works Tachys (1974), Zeitbiegung (1977), Szenen Nr. 1–3 (three scenes, 1980/82), in his first symphony subtitled Grande Ballade for saxophone quartet and large orchestra, and in two works for piano and orchestra (1978/82 and 1992).

Musik für Klavier und Orchester Nr. 1 was premiered by pianist Margarita Höhenrieder, the symphony orchestra of the Bayerischer Rundfunk, conducted by Cristóbal Halffter, on 25 February 1983 in Munich in the series musica viva.

== Awards ==
- 1974 Composition Prize of the City of Stuttgart (for Tachys; Musik für zwei Violoncelli und Orchester (1999/2000) together with Horst Lohse, Wolfgang Rihm and Manfred Trojahn)
- 1976 Kranichsteiner Musikpreis in the category composition
- 1980 Villa Massimo
- 1992 Schneider-Schott Music Prize
- 2000 Gerda-und-Günter-Bialas-Preis
