= Benedict Mason =

British composer

Benedict Mason, born on 23 February 1954, is a British composer.

Mason was educated at King's College, Cambridge (1971–75) and took a degree in film-making at the Royal College of Art (1975–78). He did not turn to composition until his early 30s, but his first acknowledged work, Hinterstoisser Traverse (1986), attracted attention from the European new music scene. His early works are decidedly postmodern in inclination, with considerable use of stylistic irony (some commentators have noted in these works a similarity to the music of Mauricio Kagel). Mason then developed an interest in polyrhythmic music, and in works such as his Double Concerto one can hear a stylistic affinity to the later works of György Ligeti. More recent works have concentrated on the spatial dimension of music, such as in his Music for European Concert Halls series, and sometimes have come close to installation art.

Mason has composed in different genres, and his soccer opera Playing Away, with a libretto by Howard Brenton, was commissioned by the Munich Biennale and premièred there in 1994 by Opera North.
