= Enno Poppe =

German composer and conductor

- Born: 30 December 1969 (age 56); Hemer, Germany
- Education: Hochschule der Künste Berlin; Zentrum für Kunst und Medientechnologie
- Occupations: Composer; Conductor; Academic teacher
- Organizations: Hochschule für Musik Hanns Eisler Berlin
- Awards: Villa Massimo; Ernst von Siemens Composer Prize

Enno Poppe (born 30 December 1969 in Hemer, North Rhine-Westphalia) is a German composer and conductor of classical music, and an academic teacher.

== Career ==
Enno Poppe studied composition and conducting at the Hochschule der Künste Berlin with Friedrich Goldmann and Gösta Neuwirth, among others. He studied sound synthesis and algorithmic composition with Heinrich Taube at the Zentrum für Kunst und Medientechnologie in Karlsruhe.

Since 1998 he has conducted the ensemble mosaik for contemporary music in Berlin. He taught from 2002 to 2004 at the Hochschule für Musik "Hanns Eisler". He received commissions from Salzburg Festival, Berliner Festwochen, Ensemble InterContemporain, The Louvre, Junge Deutsche Philharmonie, Ensemble Modern, Klangforum Wien, the Westdeutscher Rundfunk, the SWR for the Donaueschinger Musiktage and the Bayerischer Rundfunk.

Poppe was a Stipendiat of the Villa Massimo in 1995/96, and won an Ernst von Siemens Composers' Prize in 2004.

His opera Arbeit Nahrung Wohnung (Work, Nourishment, Lodging) on a libretto of Marcel Beyer was premiered at the Munich Biennale in 2008.

Since 2008 Poppe has been a member of the Academy of Arts, Berlin, since 2009 of the Nordrhein-Westfälische Akademie der Wissenschaften und der Künste and, since 2010, of the Bayerische Akademie der Schönen Künste. In 2023 Poppe was awarded the Franco Abbiati Prize from Italian Music Critics Association.

== Works ==
=== Stage works ===
- IQ (2011–2012). Text: Marcel Beyer
- Arbeit Nahrung Wohnung (2006–2007). Text: Marcel Beyer
- Interzone (2003–2004) Text: Marcel Beyer

=== Works for orchestra ===
- HUNDERT. Hommage à Pierre Boulez VI (2024)
- Strom (2023–2024)
- Schnur (2019) for cello and orchestra
- Fett (2018–2019)
- Welt (2011–2012)
- Markt (2008–2009)
- Altbau (2007–2008)
- Keilschrift (2006)
- Obst (2006)

=== Works for ensemble ===
- Blumen (2022) for ensemble
- Körper (2021) for ensemble
- Hirn (2021) for ensemble
- O Du (2020) for ensemble
- Prozession (2015–2020) for large ensemble
- Rundfunk (2015–2018) for 9 synthesizers
- Fleisch (2017) for tenor saxophone, electric guitar, keyboard and percussion
- Filz (2014) for viola solo, 4 clarinets and strings
- Speicher (2008–2013)
- Wald (2010) for four string quartets
- Salz (2005)
- Öl (2001–2004)
- Holz (1999–2000) for clarinet and small ensemble
- Dem Bones (1999–2000) for ensemble

=== Chamber music ===
- Laub (2022-2024) for seven instruments
- Quintet (2016/2020) for string quintet
- Buch (2013–2016) for string quartet
- Freizeit (2016) for string quartet
- Feld (2007/2017) for two pianos and two percussionists
- Brot (2007/2013) for five instruments
- Schweiß (2010) for violoncello and keyboard or for four instruments
- Tonband (2008/2012) for two keyboards, percussion and live electronics
- Zug (2008) for seven brass players
- Trauben (2004) for violin, violoncello, and piano
- Rad (2003) for two keyboards
- Tier (2002) for string quartet
- Gelöschte Lieder (1996–1999) flute, violin, violoncello and piano

=== Vocal music ===
- Augen (2020–2022) for soprano and chamber orchestra. Text: Else Lasker-Schüler
- Der Wechsel menschlicher Sachen (2020) for mixed choir. Text: Quirinus Kuhlmann
- Ich kann mich an nichts erinnern (2005–2015) for choir, organ and orchestra. Text: Marcel Beyer
- Abend (2007) for four male voices and four trombones
- Drei Arbeiten (2007) for baritone, horn, piano and percussion
- Gold (2006) for mixed choir
- Wespe (2005) for voice solo

=== Solo music ===
- Fell (2016) for drumset solo
- Haare (2014) for violin
- Zwölf (2014) for violoncello
- 17 Etüden für die Flöte, 3. Heft (1993/2009)
- Arbeit (2006–2007) for virtual Hammond organ
- Herz (2002) for violoncello
- Holz solo (1999/2004–2015) for bassoon or bass clarinet
- Thema mit 840 Variationen (1993/1997) for piano
- 17 Etüden für die Violine, 2. Heft (1993)
