= Márton Illés =

Hungarian composer and pianist

Márton Illés (born 12 December 1975 in Budapest), is a Hungarian composer and pianist.

Illés received musical training in piano, composition and percussion in Győr from 1981 to 1994. In 1993, he spent one academic term at the conservatory of Zurich with pianist Hadassa Schwimmer. He studied the piano with László Gyimesi at the Hochschule für Musik Basel, completing his solo diploma in 1998. Later, he continued his piano studies with Karl-Heinz Kämmerling in Hannover. He studied composition with Detlev Müller-Siemens from 1997 to 2001 in Basel, with Wolfgang Rihm and music theory under Michael Reudenbach at the Hochschule für Musik Karlsruhe from 2001 to 2005.

In 2006, Illés founded the Scene Polidimensionali chamber music ensemble

He won an Ernst von Siemens Composer Prize in 2008, and a scholarship to the Villa Massimo in 2009.

His first large scale stage work, Die weiße Fürstin, was given its world premiere in April 2010 at the Munich Biennale in a co-production with Theater Kiel. Further performances then took place in Kiel in May and June of that year.

== Works ==
The works of Illés are published by Breitkopf & Härtel.

- Víz-Szín-tér, for orchestra (2019)
- Vont-tér, for violin and chamber orchestra (2019)
- Ez-tér, for large orchestra (2017)
- Re-Akvarell, for clarinet and large orchestra (2015)
- Tört-Szín-tér, for large orchestra (2014/15)
- Rajzok II, for piano and large orchestra (2011)

== Stage works ==
Premiere	Title	Description	Libretto and source
2 Feb 2007, Theaterhaus Stuttgart/ ECLAT Festival Neue Musik Stuttgart	Emily Dickinsons Uhr	Music-theatre for soprano, four clarinets and electronics, 15'	after Unabgelenkte Aufmerksamkeit by Jürgen Muck
28 Apr 2010, Munich Biennale	Die weiße Fürstin	Music-theatre, 60'	after the first draft of the dramatic poem by Rainer Maria Rilke
