= Helmut Oehring =

German composer

Helmut Oehring (born 1961) is a German composer. He was born in East-Berlin, the son of deaf parents. After training as a construction worker, Oehring worked as a cemetery gardener, forest worker, geriatric nurse and stoker. He is self-taught as guitarist and composer. From 1990 to 1992, Oehring studied with Friedrich Goldmann and Georg Katzer at the Academy of Arts, Berlin. He was a fellow of Villa Massimo in 1994/1995. Oering is honorary professor for Théatre musical at the University of the Arts Bern.

== Awards ==
- Hanns Eisler Prize (1990)
- Prize at the Young Composers Forum, WDR (1992)
- Scholarship of Lower Saxony (1993/94)
- Scholarship of the Villa Massimo (1994/95)
- Scholarship from the Cité des Arts (1994)
- Hindemith Prize of the Schleswig-Holstein Musik Festival (1997)
- Schneider-Schott Music Prize (1998)
- Arnold Schönberg Prize (2008)
- German Music Authors' Prize in the music theater category (2015)
- Brandenburg Art Prize for Music/Composition (2016)

=== Memberships ===
- 2005 Academy of Arts, Berlin
- 2013 Sächsische Akademie der Künste

== Works ==
- c. 350 musical works of all genres

=== Autobiography ===
- Oehring, Helmut (2011). Mit anderen Augen vom Kind gehörloser Eltern zum Komponisten (in German). München: btb. ISBN 978-3-442-75296-6. OCLC 756272841.
