= Isabel Mundry =

German composer

Isabel Mundry (born 20 April 1963) is a German composer.

== Life and work ==
Isabel Mundry was born in Schlüchtern, Hesse in 1963 and studied composition at the Hochschule der Künste and electronic music, musicology and history at the Berlin Technische Universität. From 1991 to 1994 she taught at the Hochschule der Künste Berlin and furthered her studies in Frankfurt with Hans Zender and later researched at the IRCAM in Paris. In addition to her teaching activities in Berlin, she held teaching appointments in Zürich and at the Frankfurt University of Music and Performing Arts.

Mundry was the first resident composer of the Staatskapelle in Dresden. She previously held a similar position at the Tong Yong Festival, the Lucerne Festival and the Mannheim National Theater.

Mundry's compositions are characterized by a highly individualized musical language, full of variants and nuances: "She hardly ever repeats herself; each time, sounds and sequences of sounds are articulated differently." Isabel Mundry's work is currently published by Breitkopf & Härtel.

She was one of the top 10 performed composers on the Internationalen Ferienkurse für Neue Musik between 1946 and 2014.

== Awards ==
- Boris Blacher Composition Award from Berlin University of the Arts and Hochschule für Musik "Hanns Eisler"
- 1994: Busoni Award of the Academy of Arts, Berlin
- 1996: Kranichstein Music Award of the Darmstädter Ferienkurse
- 1996: Schneider-Schott Music Prize with Moritz Eggert
- 2001: Ernst von Siemens Composer Prize
- 2012: Zender Award with Martin Zenck
