= Play Without a Title =

Unfinished play by Federico García Lorca

Play Without a Title, or Untitled Play (Comedia sin título), is an unfinished experimental play by the Spanish twentieth-century modernist playwright Federico García Lorca. Lorca conceived the work as a three-act drama and had referred to it by the title The Dream of Life (echoing, perhaps, Calderón's classic Golden-Age comedy Life is a Dream), but he completed only the first act. Lorca's play was probably written in 1935, but remained unpublished until 1978; it received its Spanish-language première in 1989 at the Teatro María Guerrero in Madrid, in a production directed by Lluís Pasqual.

Gwynne Edwards, the English-language translator of the play, argues that it differs in important respects from many of Lorca's other works, insofar as it attempts a series of transgressions of the traditional boundary separating stage from auditorium. The play tackles "issues of class and ideological division, of intolerance and hatred, all of them acted out in a theatre where the actors are as much the audience as the audience the actors." Lorca's experiments in this direction echo the work of Pirandello (whose Six Characters in Search of an Author (1921) attempted to stage a similar transgression), though Lorca develops the effect in a far more politically orientated, almost Brechtian direction.

In 2014 the Liberal Arts College Theatre Society (LACTS) adapted Lorca's play to Montréal's unique political setting. Five performances were given at Mainline Theatre in Montréal. Under the direction of Alex Enescu and co-direction of Ryan Tellier the production was voted as the #1 play of 2014 by the prestigious Cult(ure) Montréal magazine.

== Works cited ==
- Edwards, Gwynne. 1994. Introduction. In Plays: Three by Federico García Lorca. London: Methuen. ISBN 0-413-65240-8. p.xi-xxxv.
- García Lorca, Federico. 1994. Play Without a Title. In Plays: Three. Trans. Gwynne Edwards. London: Methuen. ISBN 0-413-65240-8. p. 105-124.
- http://mainlinetheatre.ca/en/spectacles/play-without-title
- http://cultmontreal.com/2014/05/best-of-mtl-2014-film-arts/
