= José María Sánchez-Verdú =

Spanish composer (born 1968)

- Born: 1968 (age 57–58); Algeciras, Spain
- Genres: Classical
- Occupations: Composer, conductor, musicologist
- Years active: 1997–present
- Website: www.sanchez-verdu.com

José María Sánchez-Verdú (born 1968) is a Spanish composer.

Sánchez-Verdú graduated in Orchestra Conducting, Musicology, and Composition at Madrid's Royal Conservatory and has a degree in law from Universidad Complutense. He studied composition in 1992 under Franco Donatoni in Siena. He finished his postgraduate studies under Hans Zender at the Hochschule für Musik und Darstellende Kunst in Frankfurt from 1996 to 1999.

Since October 2001, he lectured on Composition at the Robert-Schumann Musikhochschule in Düsseldorf and since 2008 also at the Conservatorio Superior de Música de Aragon (Zaragoza).
