= Detlev Müller-Siemens =

German composer and conductor (born 1957)

- Born: 30 June 1957 (age 68); Hamburg, Germany
- Education: Musikhochschule Hamburg; Conservatoire de Paris
- Occupations: Composer; Academic teacher
- Organizations: Theater Freiburg; Basel Music Academy; University of Vienna

Detlev Müller-Siemens (born 30 July 1957) is a German composer and conductor.

== Life and career ==
Born in Hamburg, Müller-Siemens began with piano lessons at age six and began composing. He was invited to a composition class at the Musikhochschule Köln at age 13. He studied piano, composition and theory at the Musikhochschule Hamburg from 1970 with Günter Friedrichs. From 1973 to 1980, he studied with György Ligeti. He studied at the Conservatoire de Paris in 1977/78 with Olivier Messiaen. Back in Hamburg, he studied piano with Volker Banfield, and conducting with Christoph von Dohnányi. In 1985, he studied conducting further with Klauspeter Seibel.

In 1981, he was an assistant at the Paris Opéra for Ligeti's Le Grand Macabre. He was Kapellmeister of the Städtische Bühnen Freiburg from 1986 to 1988.

From 1991 to 2005, he was professor of composition and music theory at the Basel Music Academy, then professor at the University of Vienna.

An engagement with the work of Samuel Beckett since 1999 has been reflected in his opera Bing, the composition the space of a step for orchestra as well as in the chamber music works Light blue, almost white and ... called dusk.

== Prizes and awards ==
- 1980/1982: Villa Massimo, Rome
- 1986: Schneider-Schott Music Prize
- 1988: Rolf-Liebermann Grant
- 1990: Rolf-Liebermann prize

== Work ==
Compositions by Müller-Siemens were published by Schott Music, including:

- Under Neonlight I for ensemble, 1980/81
- Under Neonlight II for piano, 1980–83
- Piano Concerto, 1980–1981
- Viola Concerto, 1983–1984
- Under Neonlight III for piano, 1987
- Quatre Passages for orchestra, 1988
- Horn Concerto, 1988–1989
- Die Menschen, opera, 1989–1990
- Carillon for orchestra, 1991
- Double Concerto for violin, viola and orchestra, 1992
- Phoenix 1,2,3 for ensemble, 1993–1995
- Maiastra for orchestra, 1995–1996
- Cuts for alto saxophone and ensemble, 1996/97
- Light blue, almost white for ensemble, 1998
- Bing, musical theatre, 1998–2000
- String Trio, 2002
- Die Aussicht for choir and ensemble, 2003/04
- the space of a step for orchestra, 2003/04
- distant traces (in memoriam György Ligeti) for violin, viola and piano, 2007
- lost traces for piano quartet, 2007
- ...called dusk (in memoriam György Ligeti) for violoncello and piano, 2008
- Kommos for large ensemble, 2008/09
- Privacy (in memoriam László Polgár) for clarinet, violin and piano, 2010
- ...called dusk II for string quartet, 2011
- Three piano pieces, 2012
- ... called dusk IV for orchestra, 2012/13
- ... called dusk III for ensemble, 2014
- ... called dusk V for violin solo, 2014
- Subsong 1 for ensemble, 2015
