= Schleswig-Holstein Musik Festival =

Music festival in Germany

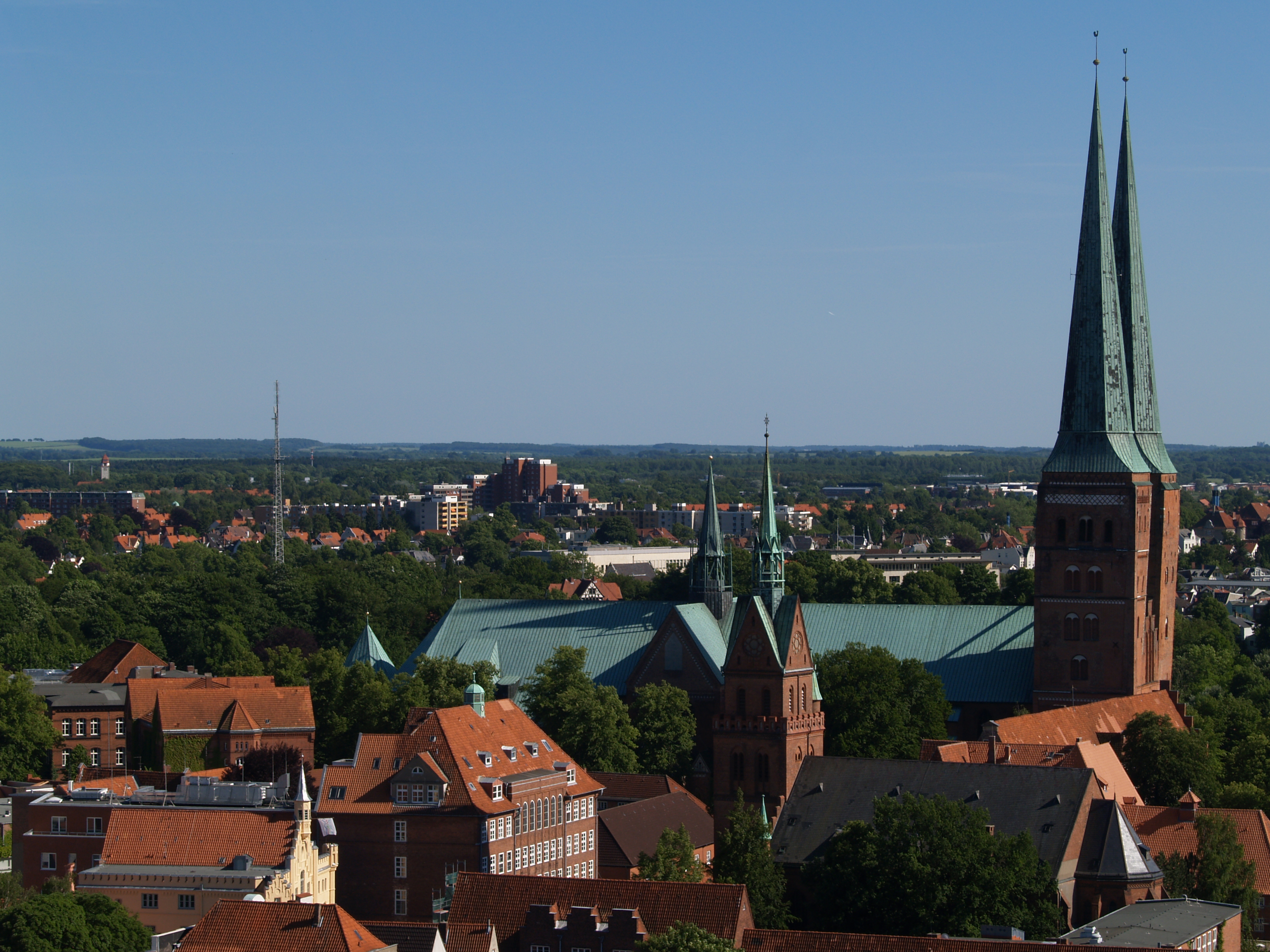
Lübeck Cathedral – site of many SHMF concerts

The Schleswig-Holstein Musik Festival (SHMF) is a classical music festival held each summer throughout the state of Schleswig-Holstein in Northern Germany.

== History ==
The festival was founded in 1986 by German concert pianist and conductor Justus Frantz. Within a short space of time, prominent supporters such as Leonard Bernstein were won over to the idea. He played a key role in ensuring that renowned musicians such as Yehudi Menuhin, Anne-Sophie Mutter, Svjatoslav Richter and Mstislav Rostropovich performed at the first edition of the festival in 1986.

In 2006, the 21st festival was from 15 July through 3 September with the Low German festival motto Dat klinkt lekker (That sounds nice). The 22nd festival in 2007 focused on Hungary, 2008 on Russia, 2009 on Germany, when the motto was Heimspiel (home game). In 2010 the motto was Poland in Pulse featuring music from Poland. The regional focus was in 2011 Turkey, in 2012 China, and in 2013 Baltic states. Beginning in 2014, the concept changed by highlighting a specific composer for each year. The composer retrospectives were devoted in 2014 to Felix Mendelssohn, in 2015 to Peter Tchaikovsky, in 2016 to Joseph Haydn, in 2017 to Maurice Ravel, in 2018 to Robert Schumann, in 2019 Johann Sebastian Bach, in 2020 Carl Nielsen, in 2021 Franz Schubert, and in 2022 Johannes Brahms.

== Concerts ==
The festival concerts and recitals are organized in collaboration with the cities of Lübeck, Kiel, Flensburg and smaller towns within the state such as Eutin or Plön, as well as in the countryside in castles, manors, old barns or little Brick Gothic village churches. Most locations are also historic sites of interest, monuments and part of the state's World Heritage Sites, including the Musikhochschule Lübeck.
