= Klaus Bernbacher =

German politician and musician (1931–2023)

- Born: 25 January 1931; Hanover, Province of Hanover, Prussia, Germany
- Died: 3 December 2023 (aged 92)
- Education: Musikhochschule Hannover
- Occupations: Conductor; Music event manager; Broadcasting manager; Academic teacher; Politician
- Organizations: Tage der Neuen Musik Hannover; Radio Bremen; Bremische Bürgerschaft; Hochschule für Künste Bremen
- Awards: Bremische Medaille für Kunst und Wissenschaft

Klaus Bernbacher (25 January 1931 – 3 December 2023) was a German conductor, music event manager, broadcasting manager and academic teacher. He co-founded the Tage der Neuen Musik Hannover, a festival for contemporary music, in 1958. He was manager for the broadcaster Radio Bremen from 1962. In Bremen, he was also a cultural politician, a member of the Bremische Bürgerschaft, and an honorary professor at the Hochschule für Künste Bremen.

== Life ==
=== Family, education and musical career ===
Born in Hanover, Bernbacher was the son of a violinist who worked as a chamber musician and in the orchestra of the Staatsoper Hannover. He came into early contact with music through piano lessons and concert visits, listening to music conducted by Wilhelm Furtwängler, Herbert von Karajan, Hans Knappertsbusch, Clemens Krauss, Hermann Scherchen, Johannes Schüler and Richard Strauss in rehearsals and performances. He studied music at the Musikhochschule Hannover to become a conductor. During his studies, he was involved in establishing the Jeunesses Musicales Internationalles festival from 1951, and the music centre at Schloss Weikersheim. In 1958, he and Klaus Hashagen founded a studio for contemporary music (Neue Musik). It was developed to the Tage der Neuen Musik Hannover, a festival held from 1958 to 1998 in collaboration with broadcasters NDR and Radio Bremen, the Musikhochschule and the Staatsoper. The festival featured music by Hans Werner Henze, Karlheinz Stockhausen, Mauricio Kagel, Hans Otte, Josef Anton Riedl, Werner Heider, Hans-Joachim Hespos, Hans Ulrich Engelmann, Helmut Lachenmann, Isang Yun, Peter Ruzicka and Detlef Heusinger, among others.

In 1962, he became conductor at Radio Bremen and department head at the broadcaster around 1969, especially promoting Neue Musik. He was responsible for around 600 radio productions and concerts over around 40 years, including with the orchestras Nordwestdeutsche Philharmonie and the Bremer Philharmoniker. Performances included Schönberg's Gurre-Lieder in the original version and Mahler's Second Symphony at the Bremen Cathedral. He has been an honorary professor at the Hochschule für Künste Bremen.

Bernbacher was married to Christa Bernbacher, who became a politician of the Green Party, from 1957 until her death in 2013. He met her in 1947 during school days. The couple had four children, two of them adopted.

Bernbacher died on 3 December 2023, at the age of 92.

=== Politics ===
Bernbacher was a member of the SPD from the 1950s until 1994, influenced by Kurt Schumacher. In 1995 he joined a Wählergruppe (voters group) Work for Bremen and Bremerhaven (AfB) as a candidate, a group of both dissatisfied SPD members and committed citizens who had not belonged to any party, led by the former savings bank director Friedrich Rebers. The AfB immediately achieved 10.7% of the votes and 12 seats in parliament for the 14th election period, including Bernbacher. He helped to ensure that culture was included in the constitution as a state objective. The AfB had no seat from 1999.

=== Other memberships ===
- Rundfunkrat Bremen
- Collaboration, together with Peter Schulze, at the citizens' initiative for the preservation of the Sendesaal Bremen famous for its acoustics.
- Landesmusikrat Bremen
- Chairman of the support association "Musicon Bremen", which supports the construction of a concert hall on the Bürgerweide according to plans by Daniel Libeskind.

== Work ==
- Klaus Bernbacher, Detlef Müller-Hennig (ed.): Dokumentation 20 Jahre Konzert des Deutschen Musikrates. Bonn 2000.

== Awards ==
In 2011, Bernbacher was awarded the Bremische Medaille für Kunst und Wissenschaft (Bremen Medal for Art and Science) for his decades of influential work for the music scene in Germany.
