= Gárdonyi =

Gárdonyi is a Hungarian surname, meaning "from (of) Gárdony". Notable people with the surname include:

- Géza Gárdonyi (1863–1922), Hungarian writer and journalist
- Zoltán Gárdonyi (1906–1986), Hungarian composer and musicologist
- Zsolt Gárdonyi (born 1946), Hungarian composer, organist and music theorist; son of Zoltán
