= Hans Ulrich Engelmann =

German composer

Hans Ulrich Engelmann (8 September 1921 in Darmstadt - 8 January 2011) was a German composer.

== Biography ==
Engelmann studied composition with Hermann Heiss and Wolfgang Fortner. He was a regular attendee of the Darmstadt International Summer Courses for New Music, and he was particularly affected by the twelve-tone classes of René Leibowitz (1948) and Ernst Krenek (1951), which helped him move from free atonality to serialism. Eventually, he would publish a history of the courses. In 1947, he began studying musicology with Gennrich Friedrich and Helmut Osthoff, earning a Ph.D in 1952. He also studied philosophy with Theodor Adorno, Max Horkheimer, Hans-Georg Gadamer.

A brief marriage took him to Iceland from 1953-4, before returning to Darmstadt to work as the music adviser and composer for the Hessisches Landestheater for the next seven years. His next post was in the same capacity at the Nationaltheater Mannheim, where his tenure lasted from 1961-9. He also held the same position one more time at the Städtische Bühnen in Bonn from 1972-3. In 1969, he began teaching at the Frankfurt Musikhochschule, and he remained on the faculty there for seventeen years.

In the early 60's, Engelmann began to incorporate techniques like electronic sound generation, graphic notation, jazz and collage into his music. By the end of the decade, he had assembled a pluralistic style which he showcased in large multimedia works such as Ophelia (1969). From 1974-9, he was largely occupied with revising his earlier work, before returning to smaller, less eclectic compositions.

A recipient of many scholarships and awards throughout his career, some of Engelmann's most notable honors include scholarships from Harvard and the Villa Massimo (1960, 1967, 1983), the Lidice Prize of Radio Prague (1960), the Stereo Prize of the German broadcasting industry (1969), the Johann Heinrich Merck Award (1971), the Goethe Medal (1986), the Order of the BRD (1991) and the Hessian Order pour le merite (1997).

== Selected works ==
Stage

- Doctor Faust's Höllenfahrt, op.4, 1949–50
- Magog, op.16, 1955–6
- Noche da luna (pantomime for dancers), 1958
- Der verlorene Schatten, op.22, 1960
- Der Fall van Damm, op.30, 1966–7
- Ophelia, op.36, 1969
- Revue, op.43, 1972–3

Orchestra

- Music for Strings, brass and percussion, 1948
- Violin Concerto, 1948
- Impromptu, 1949
- Orchestral Fantasia, 1951
- Partita, 1953
- Strukturen, 1954
- 5 Pieces, 1956;
- Polifonica, 1957;
- Ezra Pound Music, 1959
- Trias, 1962
- Shadows, scenes, 1964
- Sonata, op.32, 1967
- Capricciosi, 1968
- Sinfonies, 1968
- Modelle II, 1970
- Sinfonia da camera, 1981
- Adagio et Aria, 1996
- Concerto for percussion ensemble, 2001
- Theatre Music, im memoriam Leonard Bernstein, 2002

Vocal

- Consolationes, chorus and strings, 1952
- Elegia e canto, soprano, piano and strings, 1952
- Komposition in 4 Teilen, soprano, flute, piano, and percussion 1953
- Die Mauer, soprano, tenor, baritone, chorus and orchestra, 1954
- Atlantische Ballade, alto, baritone, percussion trio, and strings, 1955
- Nocturnos, soprano, orchestra, 1958
- Incanto, soprano, saxophone, and percussion ensemble, 1959
- Eidophonie, chorus, percussion, 1962
- Commedia humana, speaker, double chorus, cello and tape 1972
- Missa Popularis, chorus and orchestra, 1980
- Les chansons, soprano, flute, clarinet, viola, cello and piano 1982
- Stele für Büchner, alto, baritone, chorus and orchestra, 1986–7
- Omnia tempus habent, chorus, 1996

Chamber

- Jazz-Sonatine, piano, 1945
- Piano music, 1945
- Toccata, piano, 1947
- Cello Sonata, 1948
- Piano Suite no.1, 1948–50
- Olaf’s Blues, guitar and piano 1949
- 2 Piano Pieces, 1950
- Piano Suite no.2, 1952
- String Quartet, 1952
- Integrales, alto saxophone and piano, 1954
- Permutazioni, flute, oboe, clarinet and bassoon, 1959
- Variante, flute 1959
- Cadenza, piano and tape 1961
- Timbres, harp, celeste, piano, percussion quartet and tape, 1963
- Mobile I ‘Fragmente’, piano and synthesizer 1967–71
- Mobile II, clarinet and piano, 1968
- mini-music to siegfried palm, op.38, cello, 1970
- Modelle I oder ‘I love you Bäbi’, chamber ensemble, 1970
- Klangstück, violin and piano, 1974
- Divertimento, piano duo, 1980
- Assonanzen, cello duo, 1983
- Epitaph fü einen imaginären Freund, trumpet and piano, 1983
- Inter-Lineas, alto saxophone, clarinet and percussion a sax, 1985
- Dialoge, piano and percussion 1986–90
- Clarinota, clarinet, 1991
- Tastenstück, piano, 1991–3
- Essay, organ, 1992
- Ciacona, flute, bass clarinet, vibraphone, piano, violin, viola, and cello 1993
- Modus, bassoon, 1993
- Memoires à René Leibowitz, guitar, 1994–7
- Black Invocations, saxophone, trumpet, trombone, percussion, piano and double bass, 1995
- per Luigi, flute, clarinet, cello, percussion and tape, 1996
- Jazz-Capriccio, piano 2001

== Notable pupils ==
- Gerhard Müller-Hornbach (born 1951)
- Hans-Jürgen von Bose (born 1953)
- Adrian Oswalt (born 1954)
- Claus Kühnl (born 1957)
- Wolfgang Kleber (born 1958)
- Ralf Emig (born 1959)
- Rolf Rudin (born 1961)
- Karl-Wieland Short (born 1961)

== Writings ==
- Béla Bartóks ‘Mikrokosmos’: Versuch einer Typologie ‘Neuer Musik’ (diss., U. of Frankfurt, 1952; Würzburg, 1953/R)
- ‘Fragen serieller Kompositionsverfahren’, Gesellschaft für Musikforschung: Kongress-Bericht: Kassel 1962, 374–9
- ‘Rhythmus und bildnerisches Denken’, Melos, ix (1968), 261–7
- ‘Selbstgespräch über die Funkoper’, Melos, xi (1968), 418–23
- ‘Erfahrungen mit Kompositionsschülern’, Melos, xvi (1974), 347–9
- ‘Zur Genesis der Darmstädter Schule’, 50 Jahre Ferienkurse, ed. Internationales Musikinstitut Darmstadt (Darmstadt, 1996), 50–54
