= Claus Kühnl =

German composer, conductor and music teacher (born 1957)

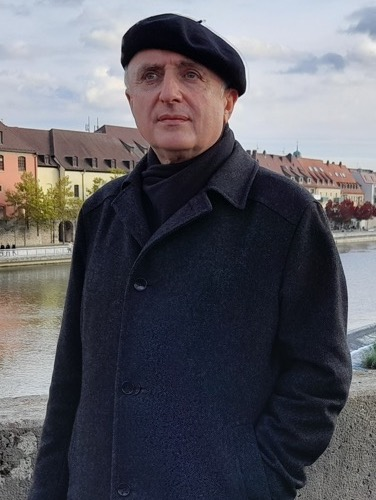
Kühnl in 2021

Claus Kühnl (born in Arnstein, Lower Franconia, 17 November 1957) is a German composer, conductor, pianist and music teacher.

== Life ==
Kühnl is the eldest child of Gudrun Kühnl (née Schmitt) from Lower Franconia and Wilhelm Kühnl who came from the Sudetenland.

His musical training began in 1973, first as an external student during his last years of high school and later, as a student at the Hochschule für Musik in Würzburg, studying with Bertold Hummel (composition), Julian von Károlyi (piano), Hanns Reinartz (conducting) and Zsolt Gárdonyi (theory). Important for him at this time were analysis courses in New Music with Klaus Hinrich Stahmer and, from 1978 to 1980, the Student Chamber Orchestra "Musici Allegri", which he himself conducted. In 1980 he successfully finished his state exam in piano and then moved to Frankfurt am Main, where he continued his studies in composition with Hans Ulrich Engelmann at the Frankfurt University of Music and Performing Arts. There he met the German composer Gerhard Müller-Hornbach, with whom he founded the Mutare Ensemble in 1981. This Frankfurt-based ensemble specialises in the performance of contemporary music and rarely performed classical music.

His first publications appeared at this time and it also marks the beginning of his teaching at the Hoch Conservatory in Frankfurt. At first he taught theory but in 1984 was able to start courses in composition and contemporary chamber music. He also taught theory in the musicology department of the Goethe University Frankfurt and at the Music Academy in Darmstadt.

In 1983, he received a grant from the Cité internationale des arts in Paris where he met Tristan Murail and Henri Dutilleux, whose works he studied intensively. As more commissions for compositions came in, he stood down as director of the Mutare Ensemble in 1986. In 1987 he met Wilhelm Killmayer at a course for young composers directed by Killmayer in Hilchenbach. His opera La petite Mort appeared in 1988 – a commission by the Frankfurt Feste (première 1991), and one year later the ensemble piece Duplum. Musik des Lichtes und der Finsternis, a commission by the Philharmonia Ensemble of the Hessischer Rundfunk.

Through a grant in 1990 from the German Academy Villa Massimo (Accademia Tedesca Roma Villa Massimo), Kühnl lived in Rome for one year. There the first thoughts germinated for a new aesthetic, which the composer described as "panharmony".

He found the first signs of globalisation positive and worked to achieve a blending of various styles and influences from which a new "alloy" could be created. A good example from this period is the piece Lausche den Winden, a commission by the Quartett avance.

After his return from Rome in 1992 he became composition teacher at the Peter Cornelius Conservatory in Mainz, a position which he gave up after one year. In the following years Kühnl, aside from his usual occupations, devoted himself to various other cultural projects, including directing Response (students compose) and for four years acting as an advisor to the Department of Culture of the city of Hanau. From 1993 until 1997 he worked, with several long pauses, on the opera Die Geschichte von der Schüssel und vom Löffel (première 1998 in Bielefeld), after a children's book by Michael Ende, who Kühnl had met three times in Munich. Since 1993 Kühnl has been an honorary member of the committee of the "Mozart-Stiftung of 1838" in Frankfurt am Main.

In the years 1999 and 2000 Kühnl held a stipendium from the "Internationales Künstlerhaus Villa Concordia" in Bamberg. There he became friends with the author Jochen Missfeldt. The works of the following period show, in contrast to those of the 90s, the use of panharmony through the economy of method and conscious use of simplicity.

The major work of this period is the Concerto for Mandolin and 13 Instruments Voller Sonnen, which had its première in 2006 at the World New Music Festival in Stuttgart. From the mid-80s he explored working with micro intervals as well as spectral music (a result of French influences) and towards the turn of the century this increasingly played an important role in his works.

Whereas at first micro intervals had played solely a melodic function in the framework of various rhetorical figures, later they played a vertical role as well, producing beat frequencies or spectral fields, which create subtle sounds of expression.

In 2016 Kühnl was appointed honorary professor at the Frankfurt University of Music and Performing Arts. Claus Kühnl ended his teaching career at the Hoch Conservatory in October 2023.

Kühnl is married to the musician Yumi Yokoyama. He has two sons from his first marriage.

== Prizes and awards (selection) ==
- 1982: Stipendium from the "Mozart-Stiftung of 1838" in Frankfurt am Main
- 1983: Stipendium from the Cité internationale des arts in Paris
- 1987: Chosen for the "Woche junger Komponisten" in Hilchenbach
- 1989: Composition Prize of the City of Stuttgart
- 1990: Stipendium from the "Deutsche Akademie Rom Villa Massimo"
- 1999: Stipendium from the "Internationales Künstlerhaus Villa Concordia" in Bamberg
- 2006: Chosen for the "World New Music Festival" in Stuttgart
- 2010: First Prize at the Concorso Internazionale di Composizione Musicale, Reggio Calabria for Sonata 1 for piano

== Compositions (selection) ==
Claus Kühnl's compositions can be found at the following publishers: Breitkopf & Härtel Hofmeister Musikverlag Edition Gravis edition 49

=== Operas ===
- La petite Mort, A Phantasmagoria (1988/89)
- Die Geschichte von der Schüssel und vom Löffel, Comic opera after the book with the same name by Michael Ende (1997)

=== Orchestra ===
- Vorspruch und Gesang des Einhorns for double bass and orchestra (1986)
- Responsorien for accordion, ensemble and orchestra (2002)
- Geheimes Wort for orchestra (2011)
- STRAHL for violin, violoncello and orchestra (2017)

=== Chamber orchestra ===
- Monodie. Musik der Stille for chamber orchestra (1981)
- Vision for 20 solo strings (1982)
- Voller Sonnen, Concerto for mandolin and 13 instruments (2004)
- Racine, Concertino for piano and 14 instruments (2006)

=== Ensembles ===
- Duplum. Musik des Lichtes und der Finsternis for 6 musicians (1989)
- Lausche den Winden for clarinet, trombone, cello, piano and other instruments (1990)
- Con Suoni e Canti Serenade for nine instrumentalists (2020), Hofmeister Musikverlag, ISMN 979-0-2034-3549-5

=== Chamber music ===
- 5 Episoden for trombone (1976)
- String Quartet (1977/1983)
- Valse miniature for double bass and piano (1978)
- un souvenir for cello and piano (1979)
- Die Klage des Hiob, 5 dramatic scenes for organ and piano (1981)
- Lichtklang for 2 pianos, four hands (1992)
- Morceau '95 for trumpet or English horn or clarinet or viola or Alto Saxophone and piano (1995)
- Offene Weite for double bass and piano (1996)
- Engel stürzen for accordion, harp, percussion and other instruments (2001)
- Nocturne en Sarabande for guitar (2004)
- Nachtschwarzes Meer, ringsum… for double bass and piano (2005)
- θriːhʌndrədændeɪtɪfaɪv (Threehundredandeightyfive) for bass flute, bass oboe und contrabass clarinet (2007)
- Korona for piano, four hands (2007)
- Tanabata, Variations on a song by K. Shimofusa for violin and piano (2008)
- Kanten for double bass and harp (2009)
- Zeitfülle Music for violin, viola, violoncello and piano (2012)
- Zeitfiguren for solo violin (2013)
- Gekippte Figur for solo violin (2015)
- Durchdunkelt String Quartet II (2015)

=== Vocal music with instruments ===
- kaze no iro for sopran, flute and piano (2001)
- Vom Grunde des Brunnens, 7 Lieder for baritone and piano (2001)
- VerStrömung for baritone, violin und piano (2002)
- Zwei Stücke for tenor (with harmonica) and amplified piano (2006)
- Cantus mysticus for tenor and piano with electric bow (2007)
- Fünf Gesänge nach lyrischen Fragmenten der Sappho nebst einem Alterslied for mezzo-soprano and piano (2010)
- Three songs based on own lyrics for soprano and organ (2022). Composed for the Paulskirchenfest 2023 in Frankfurt am Main

=== Choral music ===
- Das Verborgene Dunkel. Three sacred motets for mixed choir a cappella (2016/17), Hofmeister Musikverlag, ISMN 979-0-2034-5176-1

=== Organ ===
- Epitaph für Kaspar Hauser for organ (with mechanical action) and 3 extra players (1997)
- Sie standen mitten im verschatteten Zimmer und redeten gedämpft… (2005)
- Assisi 2006 (2007)
- Lob der Frühe (2012)
- Betrachtungen über das Sein (2020)
- Cum Novo Cantico (2022)

=== Piano ===
- im horizont hätten fahnen zu stehen…, for prepared piano, (1987)
- Anverwandlung/Doppelblick (1990)
- Wurzeln des Zufalls (1993)
- Fünf leichte Klavierstücke (2001)
- Japanische Skizzen (2003)
- Der beleidigte Papagei (2004)
- … mir in die Augen (2005)
- Sonatas 1–10 (2005–2008)
- Wie ich einst mit Killmayer die Weißwurst aß (Capriccio) (2014)
- Ein Klavier im Freien (A piano outdoors). 65 little Piano Pieces (2014–2016)
- Three piano Pieces (2019)
- Four new Piano Pieces (2019/20)
- Merci, mes chers amis for piano (2021)

== Publications (selection) ==
- Musik und Eros – Gedanken eines jungen Komponisten (Neue Zeitschrift für Musik. Mainz: Schott, July/August 1985)
- Poet der Nacht – Henri Dutilleux (Neue Zeitschrift für Musik. Mainz: Schott, January 1989)
- Verlorener Schatten oder Die Bühnenwerke Hans Ulrich Engelmanns (in: Commedia humana H.U. Engelmann und sein Werk, Wiesbaden, 1985)
- Niemals in den selben Fluss – Brief an einen jungen Komponisten zur Zeitenwende (in: Oper aktuell / Die Bayerische Staatsoper 2000/2001, Stiebner Verlag). ISBN 3-8307-1655-9, ISBN 978-3-8307-1655-6
- Klassische Ordnung erweitert: Bertold Hummel – Komponist im zwanzigsten Jahrhundert (Neue Musikzeitung, November 2002)
- Heraus aus dem toten Winkel: Claus Kühnl im Gespräch mit Julia Cloot (in: Rückspiegel Zeitgenössisches Komponieren im Dialog mit älterer Musik, ed. by Christian Thorau, Julia Cloot and Marion Saxer. Mainz: Schott Music, 2010). ISBN 978-3-7957-0118-5
- Beiträge zu einer Harmonielehre 2000. Friedrich Hofmeister Musikverlag, Leipzig 2022, ISMN 979-0-2034-3883-0.
- Die Sinfonischen Werke Bertold Hummels. In: Bertold Hummel (= Komponisten in Bayern. Band 31). Published by Alexander L. Suder. Schneider, Tutzing 1998, ISBN 3-7952-0944-7, p. 49–78.
- Beiträge zur musikalischen Zeitgestaltung. Friedrich Hofmeister Musikverlag, Leipzig 2025, ISMN 979-0-2034-3895-3.

== Students of Claus Kühnl ==
The students mentioned here began their composition studies in Kühnl's class at the Hoch Conservatory, unless otherwise noted.

- Yiğit Aydın, (künstlerisches Aufbaustudium)
- Roland Böer
- Moritz Eggert
- Frank Gerhardt
- Robin Hoffmann
- Bernhard König
- Moritz Laßmann

Other students of the last period of Kühnl's teaching activity (until 2023):

- Marisa Algari
- Marlene Jacobs
- Ágnes Peregi
- Sina Fani Sani
- Lars Schönebeck
- Robin Wächtershäuser
- Hanyu Xiao, (HfMDK Frankfurt)

== Sources ==
- M. O. C. Döpfner: Den Hörer auf geistvolle Art ergötzen. (Frankfurt Algemeine Zeitung, 3 August 1984).
- Hanno Ehrler: Surreale Gebilde unter der Oberfläche des Klanges. (Sonntags-FAZ, 16 December 1990).
- Brigitta Mazanec: Rückzug in die Stille. Komponist im Wandel. (FAZ, 18 September 1991).
- Gabriele Streit: Neue Freiheit. Über die Klavierwerke (1987–92) Claus Kühnls. Programme from the Alte Oper Frankfurt v. 11 September 1992.
- Brigitta Mazanec: La petite Mort. (CD Booklet, WERGO Mainz, 1994).
- Jochen Missfeldt: Claus Kühnls Kunst. (CD Booklet, Offene Weite, Cavalli Records, Bamberg, 2000).
- Volker Milch: Ich sehe lauter offene Horizonte. (Wiesbadener Kurier, 20 December 2000).
- Jan Kopp: Musik des Lichtes und der Finsternis. (CD Booklet, Cavalli Records. Bamberg 2003).
