= Villa Massimo =

German cultural institution in Rome, Italy

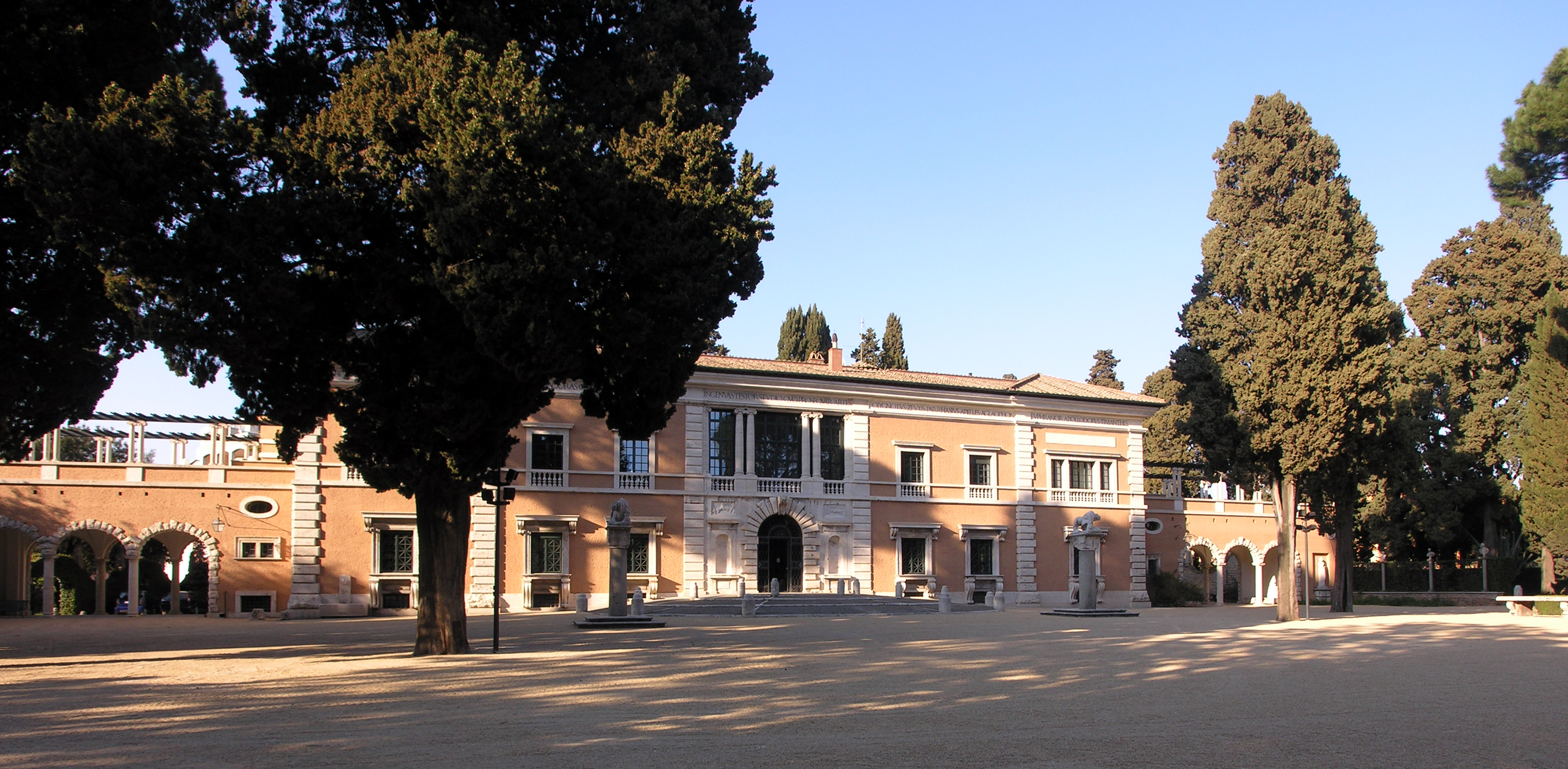
Main house of the Villa Massimo

Villa Massimo, short for Deutsche Akademie Rom Villa Massimo (Italian: Accademia Tedesca Roma Villa Massimo), is a German cultural institution in Rome, established in 1910 and located in the Villa Massimo.

The fellowship of the German Academy in Rome, often referred to as the German Rome Prize, is one of the most important awards granted to distinguished artists for study abroad. The award offers residencies of one year at Villa Massimo in Rome as well as three months at Casa Baldi in Olevano Romano to artists who have excelled in Germany and abroad, including architects, composers, writers and artists.

The institution's founder was the patron and entrepreneur Eduard Arnhold, who in 1910 acquired the property of 36,000 m^{2}, previously the suburban villa of the aristocratic Massimo family. Arnhold commissioned the main building, a large villa appropriate for official events, and ten modern studios with adjacent private residential spaces. He later donated the villa and its luxurious furnishings to the Prussian state. Today, Villa Massimo is managed by the German Federal Ministry of Cultural Affairs and Media. From 2002 to June 2019 Joachim Blüher was the director of the Academy. He was succeeded by Julia Draganović.

== Selected recipients ==
=== Artists ===
- 1931 Hermann Blumenthal
- 1932 Felix Nussbaum, Arno Breker
- 1933 Carlo Mense
- 1935 Alfred Knispel
- 1957 Fritz Koenig
- 1963 Horst Antes
- 1976 Anselm Kiefer
- 1979/1980 Rolf-Gunter Dienst
- 1980/1981 Hans Peter Reuter
- 1986/1987 Annegret Soltau, Giso Westing, Nanne Meyer, Sigrun Jakubaschke
- 1989 Manfred Stumpf, Anton Kokl
- 1991/1992 Eberhard Bosslet, Stephan Kern, Anton Kokl, Thomas Lehnerer, Michael Witlatschil
- 1997/1998 Matthias Leupold, Rolf Bier, Heike Kern
- 2003 Roland Boden, Thomas Demand, Leni Hoffmann, Matthias Hoch, Volkhard Kempter, Rainer Splitt, Silke Schatz
- 2004 Martin Schmidt, Adam Page, Frank Mädler, Markus Löffler, Andree Korpys, Eva Hertzsch, Christoph Girardet
- 2005 Gabriele Basch, Manuel Franke, Sandra Hastenteufel, Wolfgang Kaiser, Veronika Kellndorfer
- 2006 Christoph Brech, Sandra Hastenteufel, Parastou Forouhar, Astrid Nippoldt
- 2007 Aurelia Mihai, Stefan Mauck, Carsten Nicolai, Matthias Weischer
- 2008 Felix Schramm, Elke Zauner, David Zink Yi
- 2009 Fernando Bryce, Henriette Grahnert, Jochen Lempert
- 2010 Christian Jankowski, Heidi Specker, Christian Jankowski, Ulrike Kuschel
- 2011 Via Lewandowsky, Julia Schmidt, Maria Sewcz
- 2012 Jeanne Faust, Eva Leitolf, Nicole Wermers, Phillipp Lachenmann
- 2013 David Schnell, Isa Melsheimer, Clemens von Wedemeyer
- 2014 Hans-Christian Schink, Nasan Tur, Annika Larsson, Eli Cortinas
- 2015 Marieta Chirulescu, Maix Mayer, Karin Sander
- 2016/2017 Nezaket Ekici, Adnan Softic, Göran Gnaudschun
- 2017/2018 Jörg Herold, Thomas Baldischwyler, Bettina Allamoda, Christoph Keller
- 2018/2019 Sonja Alhäuser, Erik Göngrich, Wolfgang Ellenrieder, Julian Rosefeldt.
- 2019/2020 Tatjana Doll
- 2021/2022 David Czupryn
- 2025/2026 Alicja Kwade

=== Architects ===
- 1932 Carl Ludwig Franck
- 1933 Fritz Sonntag
- 1983/84 Peter Riemann
- 1986 Karl-Heinz Petzinka
- 1995 Claudia Meixner
- 2003 Imke Woelk
- 2004 Heike Schuppelius
- 2005 Heike Böttcher, Jakob Timpe
- 2006 Bernd Bess
- 2007 Antje Freiesleben, Rudolf Finsterwalder, Wieka Muthesius
- 2008 Beate Kirsch,
- 2009 Sebastian Reinhardt, Daniel Widrig
- 2010 Jan Liesegang, Norbert Sachs
- 2011 Andrea Hartmann, Matthias Graf von Ballestrem
- 2012 Antje Buchholz, Birgit Elisabeth Frank, Kai Nikolaus Grüne, Jörn Köppler
- 2013 Pia Meier Schriever, Eike Roswag, Anna Viader Soler, Verena von Beckerath
- 2014 Jan Edler, Thilo Folkerts
- 2015 Michael Hirschbichler, Jorg Sieweke
- 2016-2017 Anna Kubelik
- 2017-2018 Benedict Esche
- 2018-2019 Lars Krückeberg
- 2019-2020 Fakt
- 2020-2021 Gustav Düsing
- 2021-2022 Something Fantastic | Elena Schütz, Julian Schubert, Leonard Streich
- 2022-2023 Alfredo Thiermann
- 2023-2024 Susanne Borson
- 2024-2025
- 2025-2026 Kyung-Ae Kim | Tobias Nolte | Max Schwitalla

=== Composers ===
- 1957 and 1964 Bernd Alois Zimmermann
- 1958 Wilhelm Killmayer, Heino Schubert
- 1959 Hans Otte
- 1959 and 1962–63 Giselher Klebe
- 1960 Jürg Baur, Alfred Koerppen
- 1963/1964 Hans Zender, Aribert Reimann
- 1964/1965 Friedrich Voss
- 1965/1966 Heinz Werner Zimmermann, Wilhelm Killmayer, Heide Werner
- 1966/1967 and 1977 Erhard Grosskopf
- 1967/1968 Friedhelm Döhl
- 1968 Jürg Baur
- 1972/1973 Hans-Joachim Hespos
- 1977 Manfred Trojahn
- 1978/1979 Ulrich Leyendecker, Wolfgang von Schweinitz
- 1979/1980 Wolfgang Rihm, Peter Michael Hamel
- 1980 and 1982 Detlev Müller-Siemens
- 1981/1982 and 1983 Hans-Jürgen von Bose
- 1981/1982 and 1984 Wilfried Hiller
- 1982/1983 Renate Birnstein
- 1983 Peter Kiesewetter
- 1983/1984 Reinhard Febel, Gerhard Müller-Hornbach
- 1984/1985 Hans-Christian von Dadelsen, York Höller, Peter Kiesewetter
- 1985/1986 Harald Weiss
- 1986/1987 Michael Denhoff, Walter Zimmermann
- 1987/1988 Max Beckschäfer, Susanne Erding-Swiridoff
- 1990/1991 Wilfried Maria Danner, Claus Kühnl
- 1992/1993 Detlev Glanert, Jan Müller-Wieland
- 1993 Adriana Hölszky
- 1994 Steffen Schleiermacher
- 1995 Helmut Oehring
- 1995/1996 André Werner, Fredrik Zeller
- 1996/1997 Moritz Eggert, Detlef Heusinger
- 1997/1998 Carola Bauckholt, Markus Schmitt
- 1998/1999 Claus-Steffen Mahnkopf, Caspar Johannes Walter
- 2003 Johannes Kalitzke
- 2004 Carsten Hennig, Jamilia Jazylbekova
- 2005 Sebastian Claren, Sergej Newski, Rudi Spring
- 2006 Oliver Schneller, Maxim Seloujanov
- 2007 Dieter Dolezel, Sylke Zimpel
- 2008 Arnulf Herrmann, Stephan Winkler
- 2009 Márton Illés, Charlotte Seither
- 2010 Philipp Maintz, Anno Schreier
- 2011 Sven-Ingo Koch, Marc Sabat
- 2012 Stefan Bartling, Hauke Berheide
- 2013 Birke J. Bertelsmeier, Stefan Johannes Hanke
- 2014 Hanna Eimermacher, Vito Žuraj
- 2016/2017 Torsten Herrmann, Lisa Streich
- 2017/2018 Gordon Kampe, Jay Schwartz
- 2018/2019 Anna Korsun, Samy Moussa
- 2019/2020 Torsten Rasch, Ying Wang
- 2020/2021 Unsuk Chin
- 2021/2022 Stefan Goldmann, Hanna Hartman, Hans Lüdemann
- 2022/2023 Ondrej Adamek
- 2023/2024 Oscar Bianchi
- 2024/2025 Hans Thomaloa, Malika Kishino
- 2025/2026 Fabien Lévy, Sina Sani Fani

=== Writers ===
- 1959 Hans Magnus Enzensberger
- 1961 Joseph Reding
- 1962 Uwe Johnson
- 1972/1973 Rolf Dieter Brinkmann, Nicolas Born, Heike Doutiné, Alf Poss
- 1981/1982 Hugo Dittberner, Roland Lang
- 1993 Hanns-Josef Ortheil, Johanna Walser
- 1991/1992 Herta Müller
- 2003 Thomas Kunst
- 2004 Marion Poschmann, Dieter M. Gräf
- 2005 Julia Franck, Feridun Zaimoğlu
- 2006 Terézia Mora, Andreas Maier, Gregor Sander
- 2007 Ulf Stolterfoht, Ingo Schulze
- 2008 Navid Kermani, Thorsten Becker
- 2009 Rabea Edel, Silke Scheuermann
- 2010 Marcel Beyer, Kathrin Schmidt
- 2011 Jan Wagner, Lutz Seiler
- 2012 Katja Lange-Müller,
- 2013 María Cecilia Barbetta, Sibylle Lewitscharoff
- 2014 Oswald Egger, Martin Mosebach
- 2015 Eva Menasse
- 2016/2017 Heike Geißler, Nina Jäckle, Hartmut Lange
- 2017/2018 Iris Hanika, Uljana Wolf
- 2018/2019 Nico Bleutge, Thomas von Steinaecker
- 2019/2020 Peter Wawerzinek
- 2024/2025 Thomas Brussig, David Grossman
- 2025/2026 Barbara Yelin, Emine Sevgi Özdamar

=== Practical scholarship ===
- 2008 Christine Birkle, Friedrich Forssman, Valentina Simeonova, Till Verclas, Josef Wagner
- 2009 Martin Claßen, Armin Holz, Otto Sander, Helene Scharge, Sasha Waltz, Carolin Widmann
- 2010 Konstantin Grcic, Wolfram Gabler, Marisol Montalvo, Stephan Müller, Anna Viebrock, Tanja Wesse, Werner J. Wolff
- 2011 Peter Zizka, Soo-Jin Yim Heil, Michael Riessler, Jan Kollwitz, Lothar Baumgarten
- 2012 Till Brönner, Jacqueline Huste, Jim Rakete, Wolfgang Sattler, Markus Schroer, Phillip Stollmann
- 2013 Christian Brückner, Dieter Froelich, Barbara Klemm, Eike König, Jaroslav Poncar
- 2014 Stefan Sagmeister, Jan-Ole Gerster, Emmanuel Heringer, Paul Lovens, Saam Schlamminger
- 2015 Andreas Uebele, Manos Tsangaris, Tobias Müller, Bernd Grimm, Andreas Bode, Bettina Blümner
- 2016/2017 Anna Depenbusch, Corinna Oschmann, Iain Dilthey, Joachim Sauter, Philip Gröning, Susanne Schimk
- 2017/2018 Werner Aisslinger, Mojca Erdmann, David Schnell
- 2018/2019 Pan Daijing, Marie-Elisabeth Hecker, Martin Helmchen, Rike Schmid, Oliver Siegelin, Patrick Thomas

== See also ==
- American Academy in Rome
- British School at Rome
- Romanian Academy in Rome
- French Academy in Rome
- List of European art awards
