= Astrid Nippoldt =

German illustrator and video artist

Atrid Nippoldt
- Born: 1973 (age 52–53); Giessen, Germany
- Website: www.astridnippoldt.de

Astrid Nippoldt is a German illustrator and video artist.

== Biography ==
Astrid Nippoldt was born in 1973 in Giessen, Germany and grew up in Kleve. She has lived in Bremen and Berlin.

She has a daughter, born in 2008, and a son, born in 2014.

== Career ==
She studied visual communications at Fachhochschule Münster from 1993 until 1998. From 1997 until 2003 she studied visual arts at Hochschule für Künste Bremen at the Atelier of Time-based Media with Jean-François Guiton and Yuji Takeoka. She has been awarded fellowships, including to the Villa Massimo in 2006 and has served as artist-in-residence in the US and France. Her teaching assignments have included Hochschule für Künste Bremen and University of Bremen. She has exhibited widely in Germany and abroad.

In 2012 she co-founded Studio Nippoldt with her brother Robert Nippoldt and his wife Christine Nippoldt.

Her works are exhibited in Städische Galerie Bremen, Harvard Art Museum in Cambridge MA, Kunstmuseum Bremerhaven, FRAC Alsace in Sélestat, Collection Isabelle & Jean-Conrad Lemaître, London.

== Works ==
=== Solo exhibits ===
- 2003: 9 und Kurve, Kunsthaus Essen
- 2003: Notre Dame, Foerderverin Aktuelle Kunst Muenster
- 2004: Bloop, Staedtische Galerie Bremen
- 2005: Concorde, Paraplufabriek Nijmegen
- 2006: Grutas, Fondazione Adriano Olivettie Roma
- 2007: Kunstpreis der Boettscherstrasse, Kunsthalle Bremen
- 2007: Getaway Inn, Galerie Olaf Stuebner Berlin

=== Group exhibits (selected) ===
- 2006: Unmodern Observations, Southfirst, Brooklyn, NY

=== Publications ===
- EXPEDITION SOLAR SYSTEM – Join ETH Zurich on a journey into space. In cooperation with focusTerra/ETH Zurich, dt./en./fr./it., 2018.
- Helden: Mythische Kaempferfiguren im 20. Jahrhundert und in der Gegenwart. Hamburg: Frauen Kunst Wissenschaft, 2006.
- Stefan Berg. Astrid Nippoldt: Tryingtoland. Frankfurt a. M.: Revolver, 2006.
