= Robert Nippoldt =

German illustrator and graphic designer

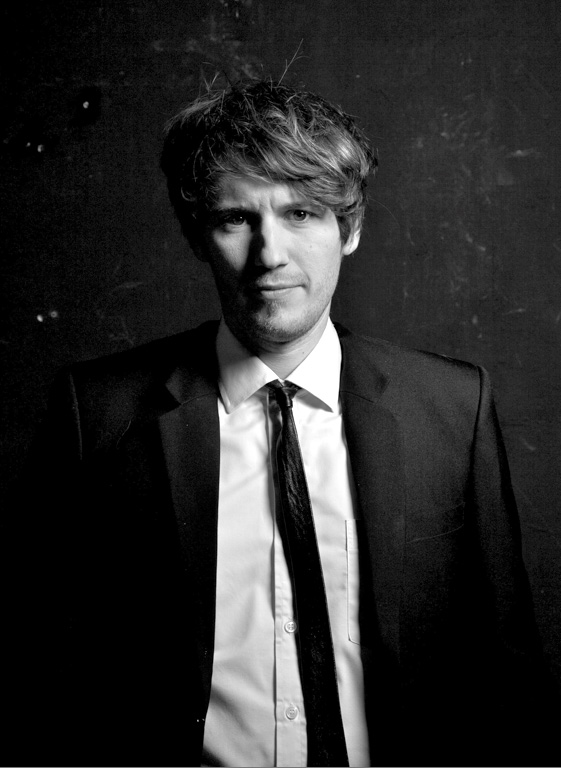
Portrait Robert Nippoldt

Robert Nippoldt (born 1977 in Kranenburg, Germany) is a German illustrator, graphic designer and book artist. He studied graphic design and illustration at the University of Applied Sciences in Münster. The book “Gangster. Die Bosse von Chicago” was his thesis project. Two years later in 2007, his second book “Jazz. New York in the Roaring Twenties” was published. It was translated into several languages and won numerous awards. In 2010 “Hollywood in the 1930s”, his third book on 1920s and 30s America, came out. In 2017 his fourth book “Night falls on the Berlin of the Roaring Twenties” was published. His books are accompanied by games and limited edition silkscreen prints. In addition to his book projects, he illustrates for international magazines and clients including The New Yorker, Le Monde, Die ZEIT, Mercedes-Benz, Reader’s Digest, Taschen and TIME Magazine. For commissions of this nature he collaborates with his sister Astrid Nippoldt and his wife, Christine Nippoldt, as part of their own label, Studio Nippoldt.

"Ein Rätselhafter Schimmer“ is the accompanying show to the Berlin book. The stage programme with live drawings and live music was developed in 2015-2018 by Robert Nippoldt and the „Trio Größenwahn“. The show has been performed more than 50 times, among others in the Pantheon-Theater in Bonn, at Berlin Heimathafen, at Schloss Elmau, at Kurhaus Göggingen and on the cruise ships of AIDA.

Robert Nippoldt’s works have been shown in exhibitions in Germany, Switzerland, Belgium and Spain. His studio is located at the old freight yard in Münster.

== Publications ==
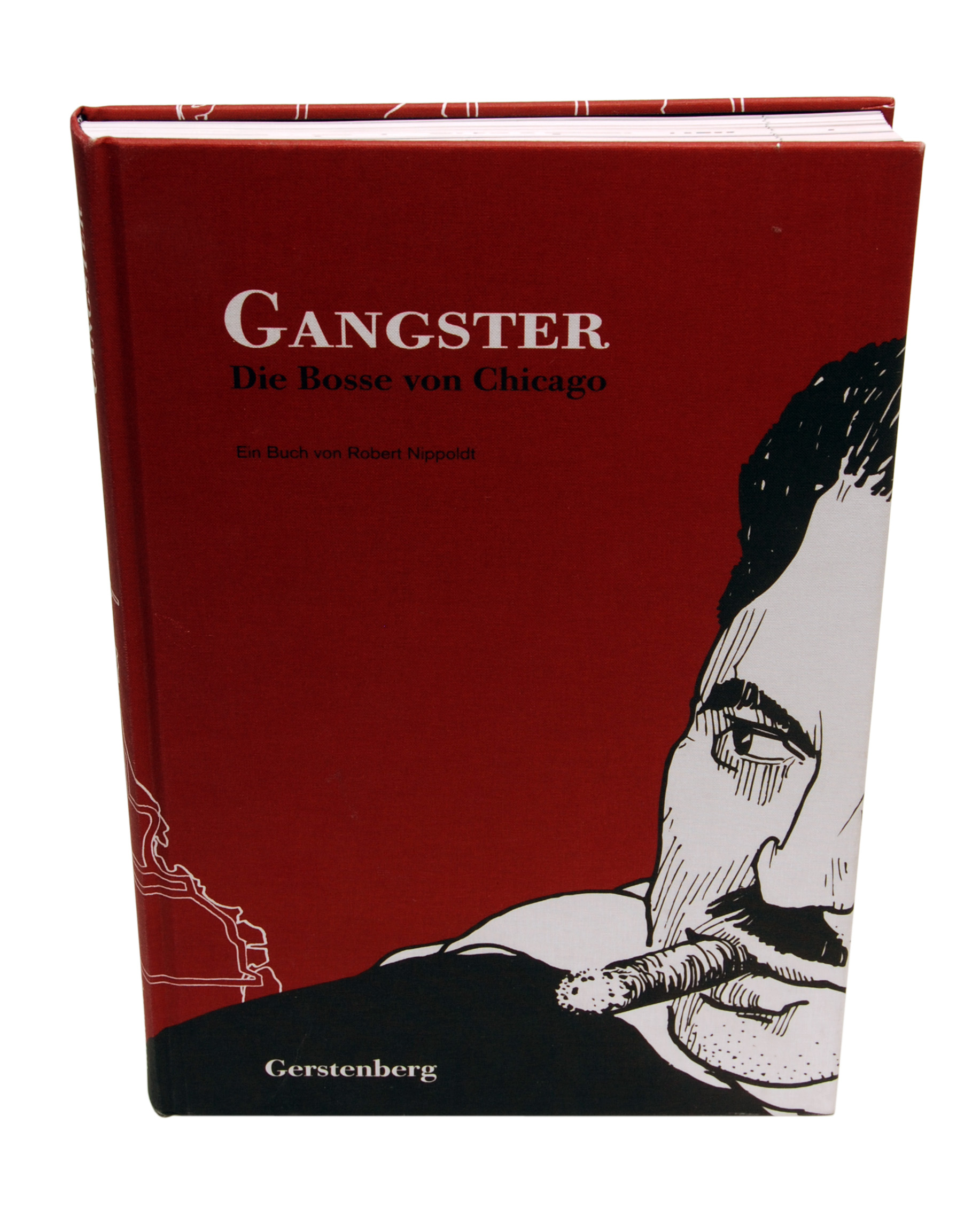
Gangster. Die Bosse von Chicago

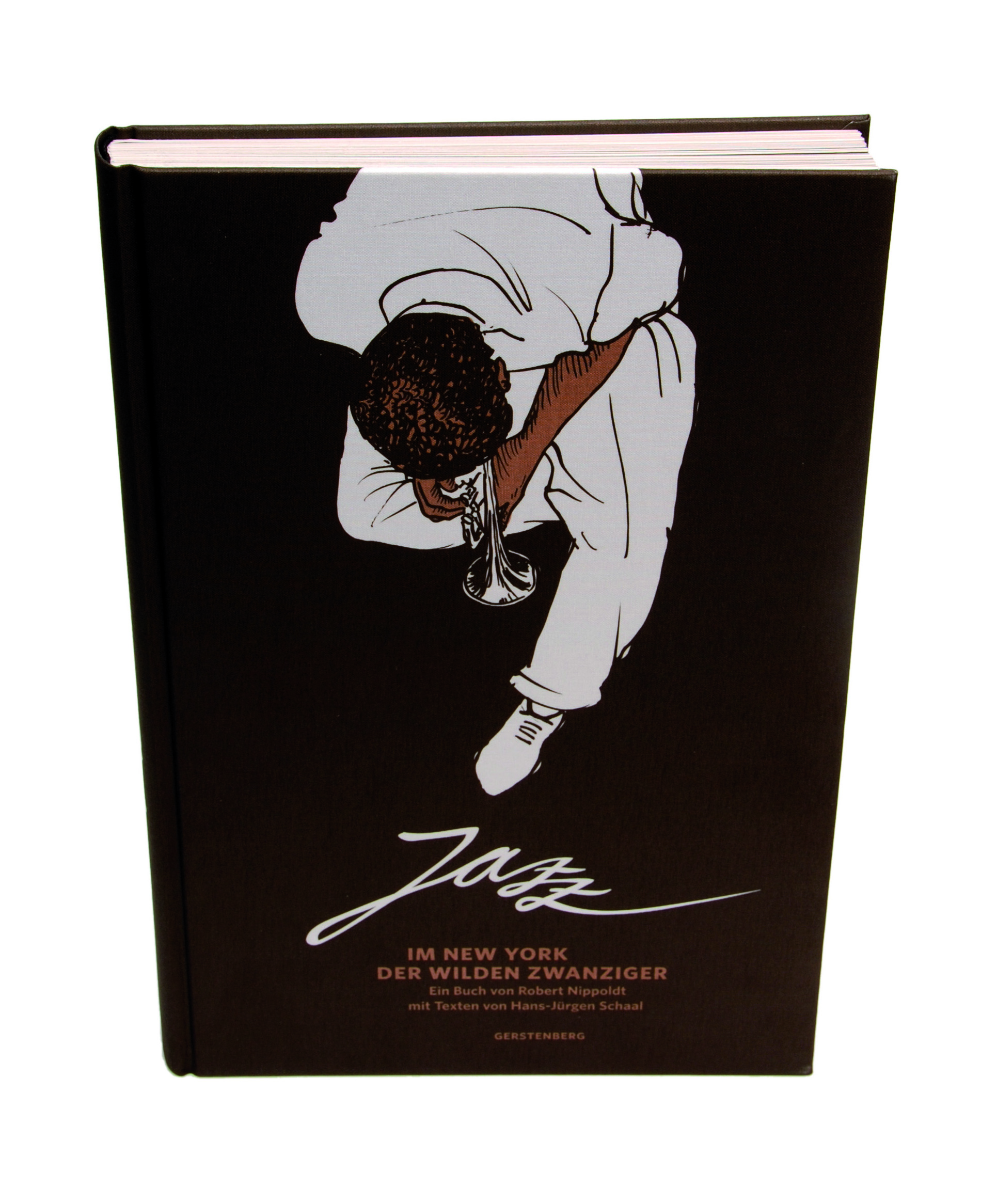
Jazz. New York in the Roaring Twenties

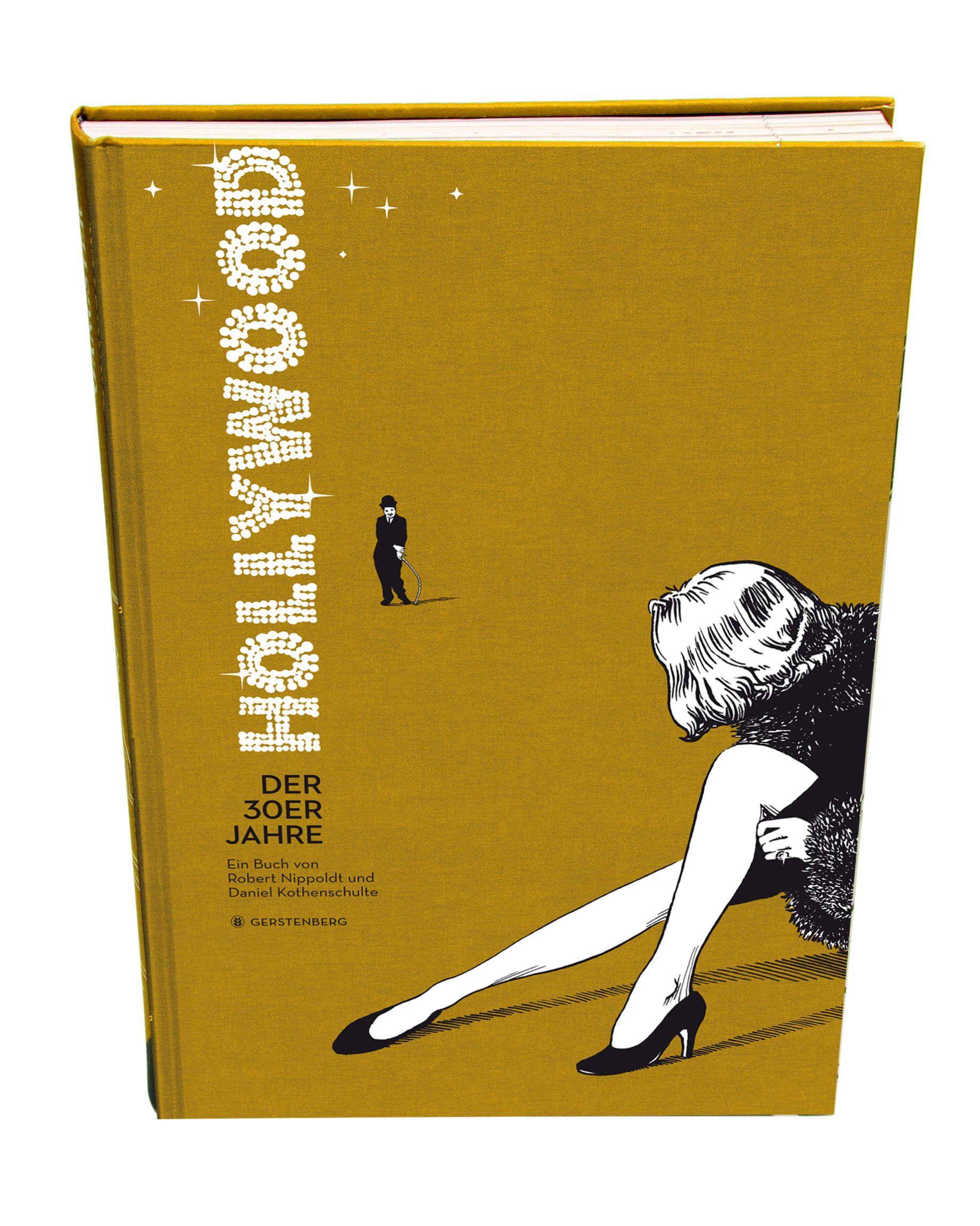
Hollywood in the Thirties

- Gangster. Die Bosse von Chicago, Gerstenberg Verlag, Hildesheim 2005. ISBN 978-3-8067-2941-2
- Jazz. New York in the Roaring Twenties with Hans-Jürgen Schaal (text), TASCHEN 2013, ISBN 978-3836545013
- Hollywood in the Thirties with Daniel Kothenschulte (concept, text) and Christine Goppel (coloration), TASCHEN, 2013, ISBN 978-3-8369-2628-7
- The Great Transformation: Climate – Can we beat the Heat with Christine Goppel, Jörg Hartmann, Jörg Hülsmann, Astrid Nippoldt and Iris Ugurel, published by A. Hamann, C. Zea-Schmidt and Reinhold Leinfelder, WBGU, Berlin 2014. ISBN 978-3936191417
- Night Falls on the Berlin of the Roaring Twenties with Boris Pofalla (text), TASCHEN 2017, ISBN 978-3-8365-6320-8

== Awards ==
- iF Design Award for “Berlin”, 2019, Hannover
- German Design Award for “Berlin”, 2019, Frankfurt
- Best Book Award for “Berlin”, 2018, Los Angeles
- Berliner Type Award for “Berlin”, 2018, Berlin
- red dot design award for “Berlin”, 2018, Essen
- ADC Award for “Berlin”, 2018, Berlin
- Joseph Binder Award for “Berlin”, 2018, Vienna
- International Creative Media Award for “Berlin”, 2018, Meerbusch
- Movie book of the month, Hans Helmut Prinzler, for “Berlin”, January 2018, Berlin
- German Design Award for “Jazz”, 2016, Frankfurt
- Best American Infographic for “Facemap” in “Hollywood”, 2015, New York
- International Book Award for “Jazz”, 2014, Los Angeles
- Good Design Award for “Jazz”, 2014, Chicago
- Joseph Binder Award for “Jazz”, 2014, Vienna
- A' Design Award for “Jazz”, 2014, Como
- D&AD, Award for “Jazz”, 2014, London
- Best American Infographic for “The Recording Sessions – Sociogram” in “Jazz”, 2014, New York
- International Design Award for “Jazz”, 2013, Los Angeles
- German Designer Club Award for “Hollywood”, 2011, Frankfurt
- red dot design award for “Hollywood”, 2011, Essen
- Movie book of the year, Hans Helmut Prinzler for “Hollywood”, 2010, Berlin
- European Design Award for layout for “Jazz”, 2008, Stockholm
- Stiftung Buchkunst “The most beautiful german book 2007” for “Jazz”, 2007, Frankfurt
- Illustrative: “One of the most wonderful books in Europe” for “Jazz”, 2007, Berlin
- red dot design award for “Gangster”, 2006, Essen
