= Hans Lüdemann =

German pianist and composer

Hans Lüdemann (born September 14, 1961, Hamburg) is a German pianist and composer known primarily for his jazz performances which blend with different kinds of ethnic musical cultures.

== Career ==
Lüdemann was trained at the Hamburger Konservatorium and the Hochschule für Musik und Tanz Köln. He also studied piano privately with Joachim Kühn. He led his own bands, Nana (1984-1985), Blaufrontal (1989-1993), and RISM (beginning 1990). In 1985-1986 he played in a band led by Eberhard Weber and Jan Garbarek, and in 1991-1992 he played in Heinz Sauer's band. With Paul Bley he recorded the album Moving Hearts (1993, West Wind Records). In 1996 he put together a solo program entitled "The Natural Piano" which he toured in Europe, and then later the United States (1998) and West Africa (1999). He recorded that program on the album The Natural Piano (1994, Jazz Haus Musik). His other recordings included the album Futurism (1997, Jazz Haus Musik

Lüdemann's music compositions were the feature of two concerts at the Musiktriennale Köln in 1997. One of his compositions is the song cycle Verloren ins weite Blau. He taught on the faculty of the Hochschule für Musik und Tanz Köln in the 1990s.

He was awarded the Villa Massimo Prize in 2022.
