= Renate Birnstein =

German composer, violinist and pianist

Renate Maria Birnstein (born 17 November 1946) is a German composer, violinist and pianist. She was born in Hamburg, and studied at the Hochschule fur Musik with Diether de la Motte and György Ligeti, receiving her diploma in composition and piano in 1973.

After completing her studies, Birnstein took a position teaching at the Hochschule fur Musik in Hamburg. Birnstein won the 1983 Prix de Rome. Her music has been performed internationally. Her work is completely committed to the ideals of the new music. She prefers small forms in which the musical material is freely processed according to a strict concept.

== Biography ==
Renate Birnstein was born in Hamburg in 1946. She received her first violin lessons at the age of seven and began composing. Later, she switched to the viola and, at thirteen, despite her family's initial incomprehension, also began piano lessons. Support was primarily provided for her through creative opportunities, such as those offered by a Waldorf school. As a violist, she was able to participate in numerous ensembles and school orchestras. After a period of writing, she devoted herself entirely to composition from the age of seventeen, becoming particularly interested in the craft of making music. She received instruction in composition and music theory, first from her music teacher, and then, after graduating from high school, as part of her studies at the Hochschule für Musik und Theater Hamburg with Diether de la Motte and György Ligeti. While de la Motte encouraged his student, Ligeti strengthened her self-criticism with rigorous assessments.

Renate Birnstein passed her music education and piano exams in 1969 and earned her diploma in composition and music theory in 1973. During her studies, she held a position as a professor of music theory at the Lübeck University of Music, a post she held for many years. Later, she also took up a professorship at the Hochschule für Musik und Theater Hamburg, where she taught composition and music theory from 1988.

From 1972 to 1976, Renate Birnstein was one of the first female composers to participate in the Darmstadt International Summer Courses for New Music, where she attended courses with Karlheinz Stockhausen, Iannis Xenakis, Mauricio Kagel, Cristóbal Halffter, and György Ligeti. In 1971, she received a prize at the Marler Composition Competition; in 1974, first prize at the composition competition of the Hamburg State Association of Musicians and Performers; and in 1978, a prize at the Hitzacker Summer Music Days International Chamber Music Composition Competition, as well as the Stuttgart Prize.

In 1977, she worked as part of a three-month fellowship at the Künstlerhaus Boswil in Switzerland; in 1979, she received the Bach Prize from the City of Hamburg; and in 1982 - 1983, a year-long fellowship at Villa Massimo in Rome.

In 1987, Renate Birnstein was one of the first female composers to be admitted to the Freie Akademie der Künste Hamburg.

== Style and Influences ==
Deeply impressed by Alban Berg and Anton Webern, Renate Birnstein sought to forge her own path from the outset. She herself does not feel rigidly bound to any particular compositional direction, but rather categorizes technique under "what the music truly needs."

The twelve-tone technique of the Second Viennese School and serial techniques, which Birnstein recognized as established compositional methods, still shaped her early works. Later, her encounter with and subsequent intensive discussion of Steve Reich's music in 1972 influenced her middle-period pieces, which represent a blend of elements of American minimal music with European formal thought. She subsequently explored the superposition of different time signatures, meters, and tempos, resulting in the dissolution of conventional orchestral sound groups and blurring the boundaries between chamber and orchestral music.

== Works ==
Birnstein composes for orchestra, theater, chamber ensemble, choral and piano performance. Selected works include:

- 'Villa Massimo
- Imaginations for orchestra, 1972
- Ich rufe an mit meiner Stimme, 1981
- Octet for flute, clarinet, trombone, viola, cello and two percussionists, 1985
- Pranto ocre for baritone and piano to the text of the Brazilian poet Paes Loureiro, 2003
- Les horloge, theater work
- Les grains de sable, theater work
