= Peter Riemann =

German architect

Peter Riemann (born 23 November 1945 ) is a German architect, professor, and author.

== Early life and education ==
Riemann was born on 23 November 1945 in Eschwege, Hesse, Germany. After graduating from high school in 1965, he served for two years in the German Air Force as an Air traffic controller at the GCA-facility in Fürstenfeldbruck.

Riemann began studying civil engineering and architecture at TU Braunschweig in 1967, where he worked as a research and teaching assistant from 1973 to 1974. He completed his studies in 1975 under Meinhard von Gerkan with a thesis on Stuttgart Airport.

In 1976, he joined the graduate class of Oswald Mathias Ungers at Cornell University in Ithaca, New York, with a scholarship from the DAAD. He participated in 1977 in the "First Cornell Summer Academy" in West-Berlin, where he developed the concept for the “City in the City: Berlin - A Green Archipelago” as a precursor to the International Building Exhibition Berlin with Rem Koolhaas and O.M. Ungers. Back in Cornell he worked as teaching assistant and instructor, travelled through Canada and the East Coast of the United States and toured the American Southwest with an Robert James Eidlitz-Travel Fellowship. After completion of his master's thesis he returned to Germany in January 1979. (Biography in: The City in the City:

== Career ==
After graduation from the Technical University of Braunschweig, Riemann was employed at the Heinz Wilke firm in Hanover. As design architect, he was part of the Munich Airport II competition team from 1975 to 1976 and developed the preliminary design for the Moscow-Sheremetyevo II Airport

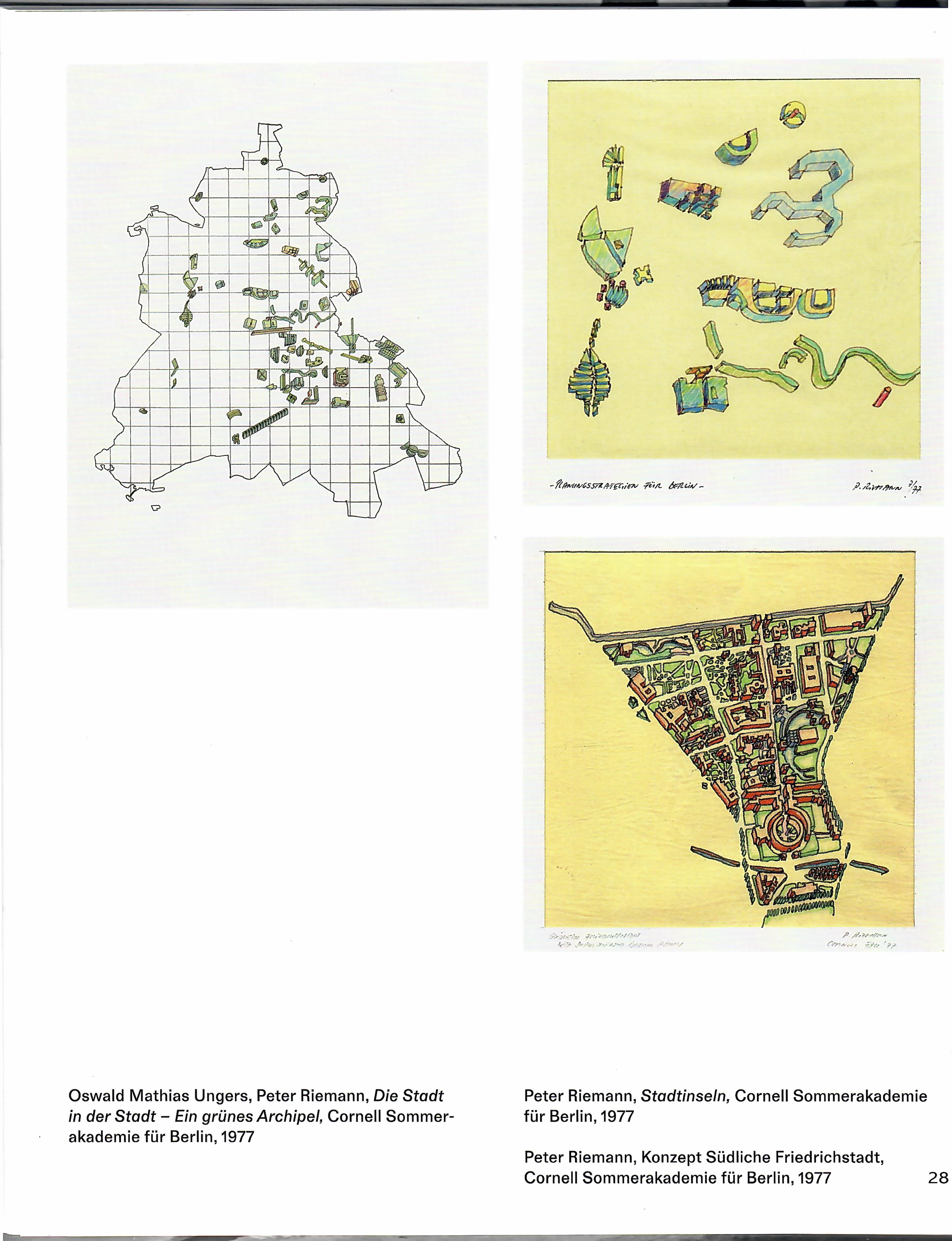
Exhibition "Anything goes? - Berlin Architectures of the 1980s", Berlinische Galerie Museum of Modern Art. Catalogue page 28 (2021)

In 1979 Riemann started his second professional practice at the WLP – Planning Group which was commissioned to build the „Central-Area” for the Federal Ministry of Defense in Bonn. He became a licensed architect in 1980, realized a few small housing and renovation projects and participated in Public art competitions. As winner of the German Rome Prize 1983/84, he lived and worked as a fellow in the Villa Massimo in Rome. In 1985 he was invited to take part in the exhibition "Bauen Heute" at the DAM and participated in the exhibition: "Berlin - Denkmal oder Denkmodell" as part of the European City of Culture 1988”, which was presented at the "Staatliche Kunsthalle Berlin" and later in Paris, Vienna and Kyiv.

The „Riemann + Roy” office partnership (1984) ended in 1993 with the death of Hans-Werner Roy. In 1994 Riemann was officially added by the Chamber of Architects to the list of urban planners and the firm turned into „Office for Architecture and Urban Planning” and later into: “RiemannArchitekten.” As a member of the Association of German Architects he served five years as a delegate to the Architectural Heritage Preservation Working Group of the International Union of Architects.

At the end of 2009 he closed his Bonn office, moved to Starnberg to work as architectural consultant, mediator and journalist. Ten years later he settled in Austria and lives close to Graz. Throughout his professional practice, Riemann published various articles in architectural and art journals.

== Teaching ==
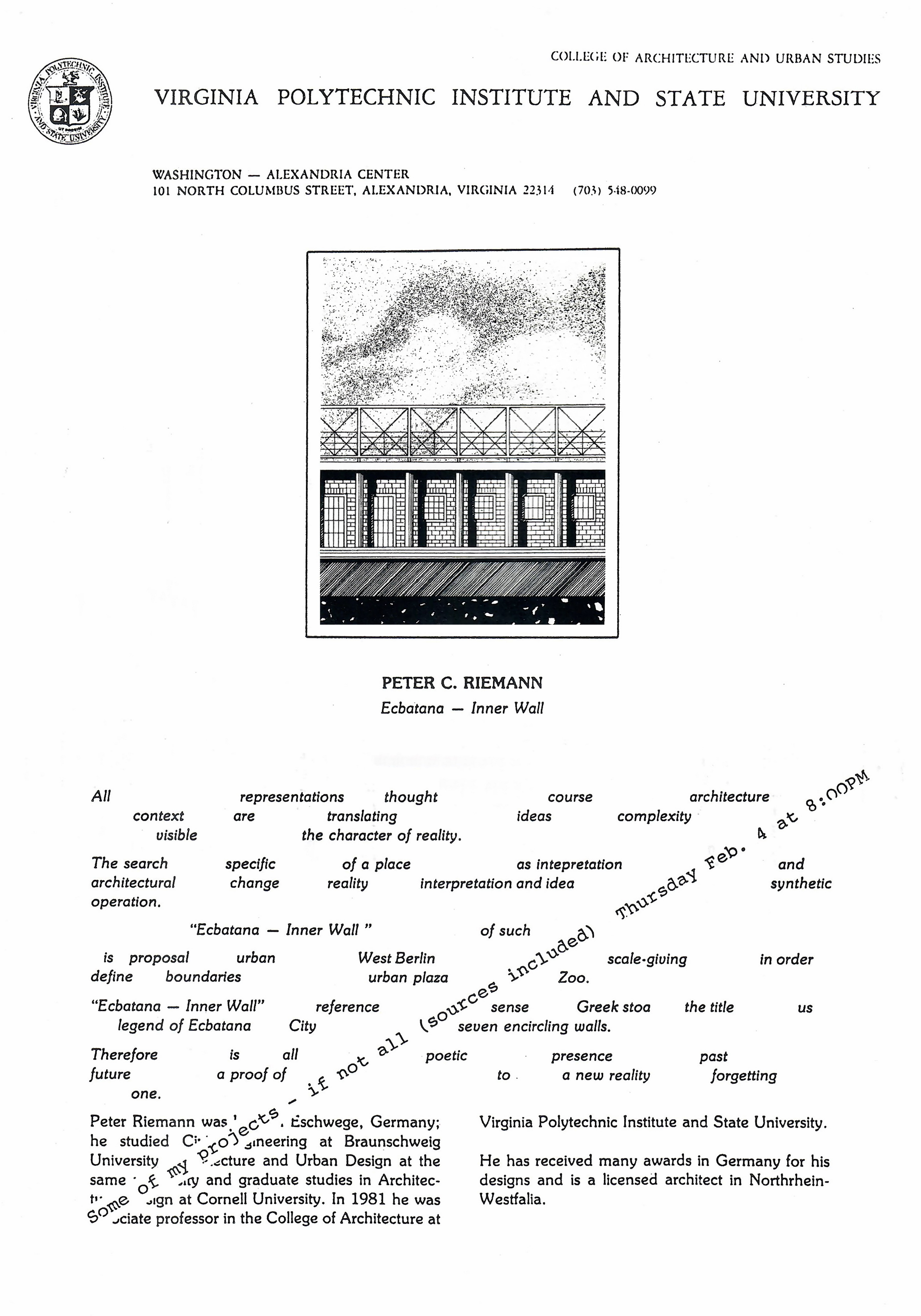
Lecture announcement VPI & SU, 1981

From 1985 to 1995 Riemann was a visiting critic and lecturer at various universities (Notre Dame University-Rome Program; Städelschule/Frankfurt; Bauhaus University, Weimar; Technical University of Dortmund; School of Architecture (HSB) in Bremen) and as adjunct professor at the Düsseldorf University of Applied Sciences (1985–1988) and the Cologne University of Applied Sciences (1988–1993).

He served four termes as associate professor at Virginia Tech and the WAAC in 1981-1982 and became an interim professor at the Department of Architecture at Cologne University of Applied Sciences from 1995 – 1999.

As co-author of „Berlin´s Green Archipelago” he was invited in 2014 to the International Master's Program of ENSAV in Paris and in 2026 to the Urban Design Program at University of Applied Sciences in Potsdam and to the Berlin University of the Arts.

== Work ==
=== Architecture ===
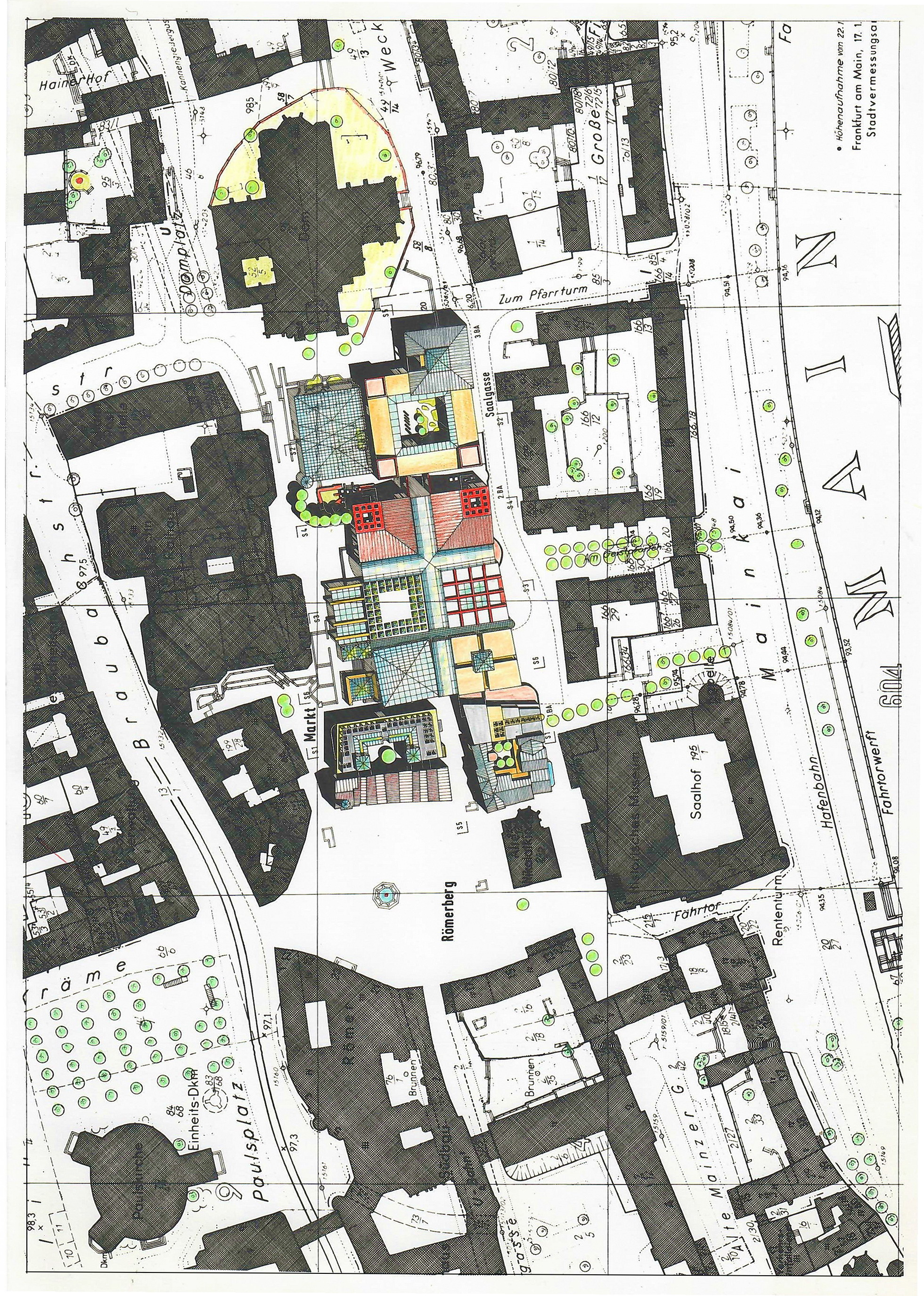
Site plan, National Dom-Römerberg Competition Frankfurt. 5th prize, Peter Riemann, "inspired by. O. M. Ungers", Falk Jaeger in: (db 9/1980)

Riemann's change as one of the last graduates from the rather function - oriented "Braunschweiger Schule", the label for architectural teaching at TU Braunschweig, is visible in his master´s thesis project, a linar passenger terminal for Stuttgart Airport, released by the chair of professor Meinhard von Gerkan. The combination of structural and functional units with thoroughfare capabilities and pedestrian treadmills resembles O.M. Ungers’ 1966 competition design for the expansion of Berlin's Tegel Airport.

Other influences at Cornell included visiting professors Aldo Rossi and Josef Kleihues, as well as his contact to Mario Campi, a bridge to the 1975 "School of Ticino". These experiences led to competition entries such as the 5th prize for the Römerberg area in Frankfurt (1980, with W. Pax), the design for the "Bonn Parliamentary Precinct", and the “minicities” for the IBA 1980 competition for Rauchstrasse and the southern edge of the Tiergarten in Berlin, as well as the competition purchase for the revitalzation of the old "Chronos Works"-site in Hennef (all during the office partnership with H.W. Roy).

Riemann's typological approach is clearly evident in the completed buildings, such as the “Basilica-type” commercial building at Bonn’s North Cemetery, the large-scale urban development project of the "Storchenpark" in Speyer, and other completed commissions by the firm of RiemannArchitekten. They were mainly residential and school buildings, the expansion and renovation of churches and community centers and the design of interior spaces, both commercial and private. The projects were realized in North Rhine-Westphalia, Rhineland-Palatinate and Bavaria.

=== Public Art ===
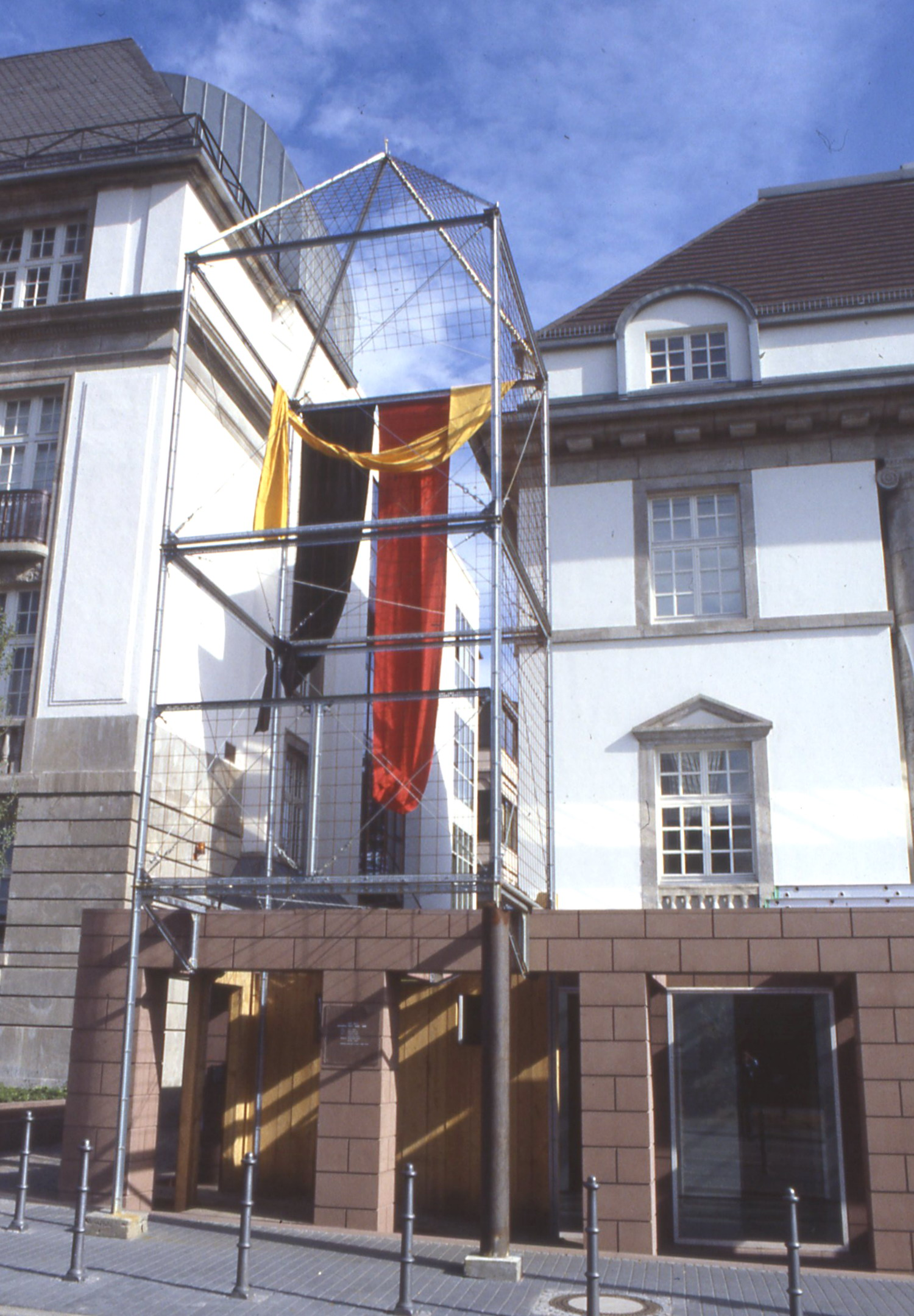
"Tower No. 3". Temporary landmark for "Building Today", exhibition at German Architecture Museum in Frankfurt (1985)

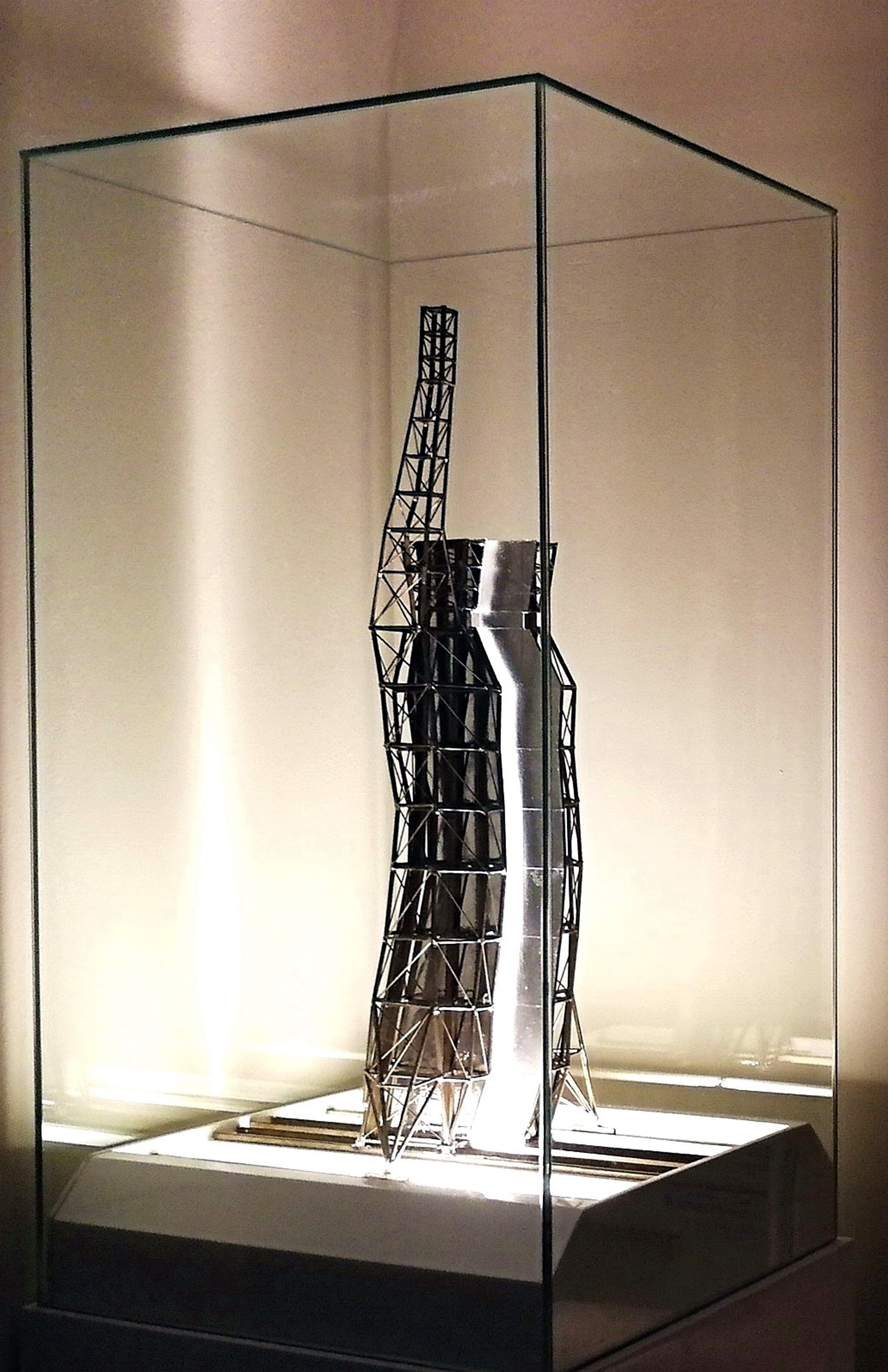
Split Statue of Liberty on rails as "East-West Monument" at Platz der Republik in Berlin, European Capital of Culture (1988)

Alongside his work, Riemann occasionally entered competitions for architecture and art in public spaces. Some of these projects are now housed in museums and collections:

- The Taubman Museum of Art in Roanoke, Virginia, houses two drawings related to “Ecbatana” (Inner and Outer Wall) in its digital central archive. These were created for the competition to “Redesign Hardenbergplatz in Berlin” (1979).

- The collection of the Deutsches Architekturmuseum in Frankfurt includes 19 items (drawings and models) from various projects by the architect.

- The Berlinische Galerie and the UAA Foundation in Cologne house collections of text, sketches and drawings related to “City Within a City” (1st Cornell Summer School, 1977) and the master's thesis “Urban Design Strategies for Berlin with a Case Study on Südliche Friedrichstadt” (Cornell, January 1979).

Some of these drawings and models have also been featured in international exhibitions, such as the Orangerie (Kassel), Triennale di Milano, Kunsthalle Wien, Pavillon de l'Arsenal in Paris and the MoMA in New York City.

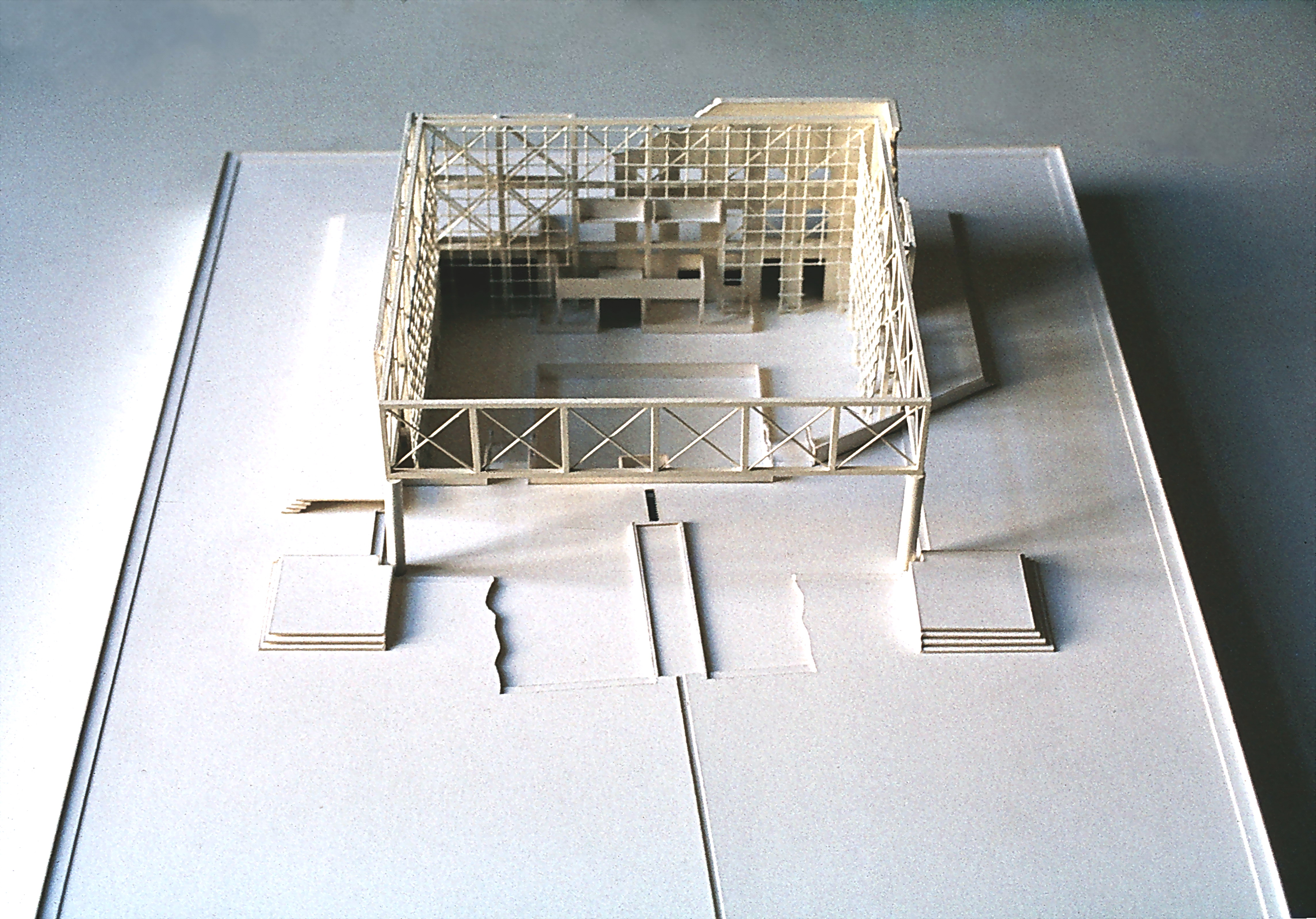
Sunken plaza with pool and ivy-covered scaffolding at Breitscheidplatz, Berlin.

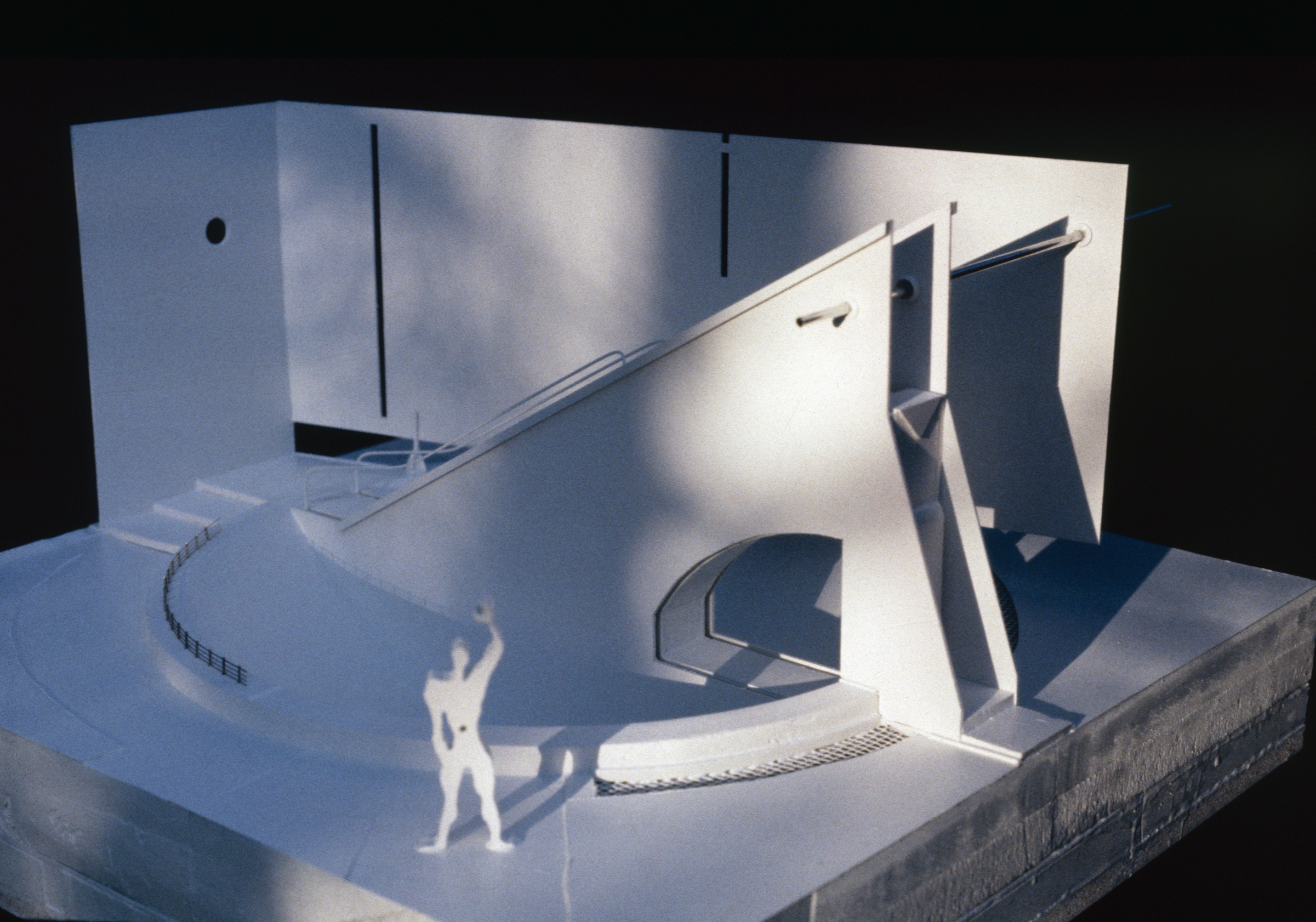
Fountain object for the Max Planck Institute for Radio Astronomy, Bonn.

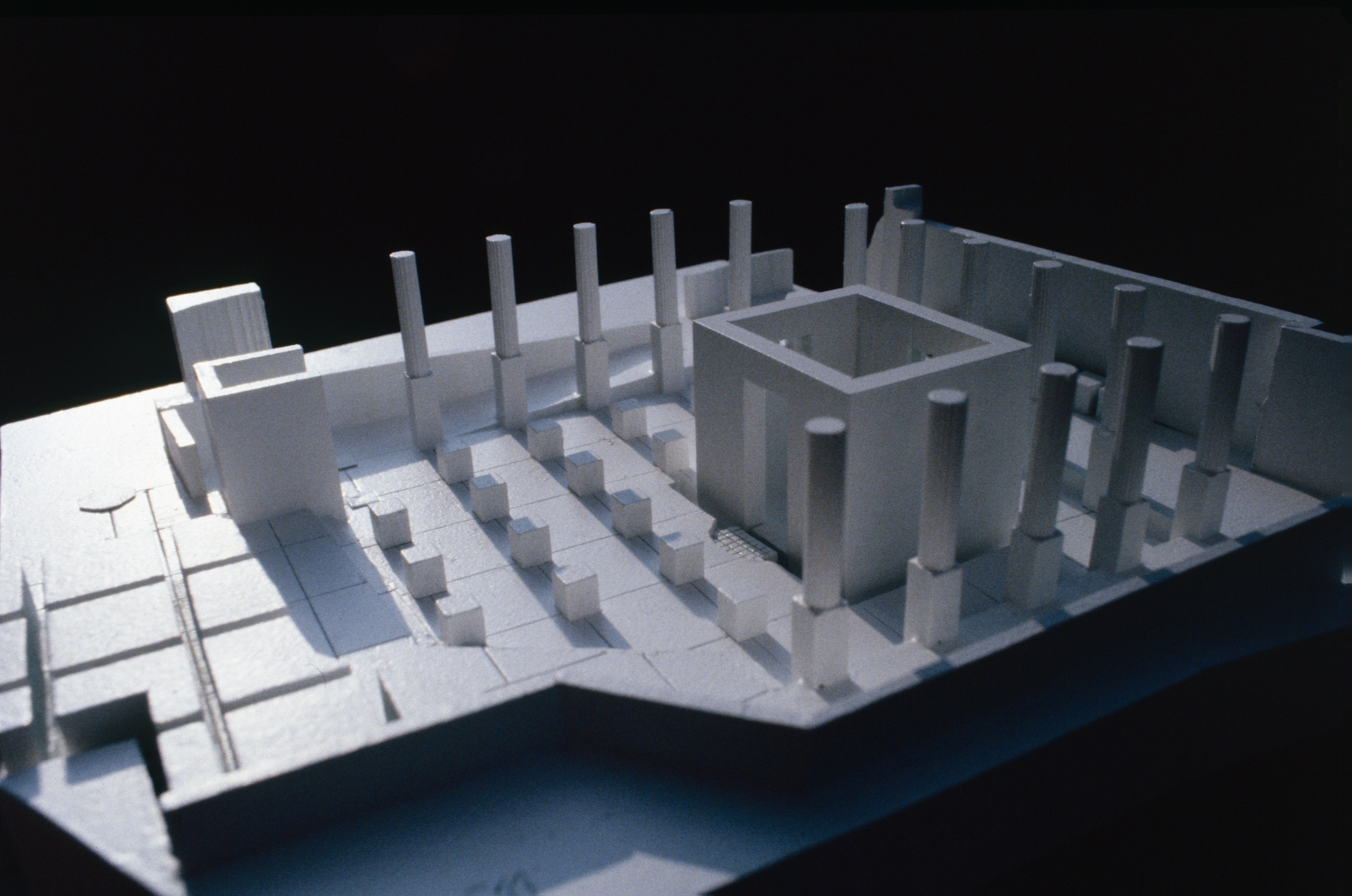
Archaic temple memorial on the site of the former synagoge in Lemgo.
