= Joachim Blüher =

German art historian and cultural manager

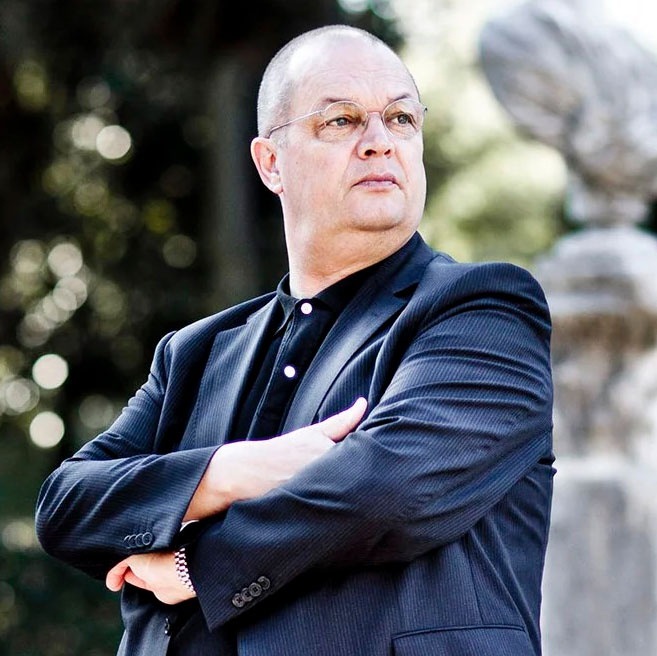
- Blüher in the garden of Villa Massimo
- Born: 1953 (age 72–73); Uelzen, Lower Saxony
- Known for: Director of Villa Massimo (2002–2019)

Joachim Blüher (born 1953) is a German art historian and cultural manager. Since 2002 he has been the director of the German Academy Villa Massimo in Rome.

== Biography ==
=== Early life ===
After completing school in 1974 Joachim Blüher did his community service in the preservation of archaeological monuments in Mainz. Subsequently, he studied art history and archaeology in Mainz, Vienna, Rome and Bonn. In 1989 he was awarded a doctorate by the Rhineland Friedrich Wilhelms University in Bonn on the topic of The Former Rotunda of St. Martin's Minster – Heavenly Jerusalem in Twelfth Century Bonn. During his studies he worked as a restorer in the archaeological sector in Germany and France. In addition he was active as a photographer and curator of exhibitions of international jewellery design at the Birgitta Knauth Gallery in Bonn.

=== Gallery-owner and the Joachim Blüher Gallery ===
Blüher worked for the Michael Werner Gallery in Cologne and New York from 1989 to 1993. From 1993 on he ran the Joachim Blüher Gallery at Gertrudenstr. 7 in Cologne. There he presented artists such as Georg Baselitz, Sigmar Polke, A.R. Penck, Jörg Immendorff and Per Kirkeby, but also represented younger artists such as Jean-Michel Alberola, Siegfried Anzinger, Saskia Niehaus, Peter Roesch, Dirk Sommer and Barbara Camilla Tucholski. In 1994 Blüher displayed a small selection of drawings by Victor Hugo in his gallery. In Intime Protokolle der Phantasie – Der Romancier Victor Hugo als Zeichner ("Intimate Records of Fantasy – The Novelist Victor Hugo as Graphic Artist"), 27 small works from the novelist's little known graphic oeuvre were exhibited which is normally kept at the Bibliothèque Nationale in Paris.

In 1994 and 1996, the photographer Benjamin Katz had exhibitions in the Blüher Gallery. In 1998 and 2001 Blüher showed photographs by Jaroslav Poncar and in 2001 by the photographic journalist, Thomas Rabsch.

=== Director of Villa Massimo ===
In 2002 Blüher was appointed by the then Cultural Secretary of State, Julian Nida-Rümelin, as Director of the Villa Massimo, the German Academy in Rome, and entrusted with implementing its new conception. Among other things, the aim was to strengthen the standing of the academy as an institution for advancing highly gifted German artists and to network the Villa closely with the Roman cultural scene.

Due to his fluent Italian, Blüher had gained the appointment over 160 other applicants. Already in the early 1980s he had lived in Rome. Now he moved there with his wife, Birgitta Knauth, a Bonn jewellery gallery-owner, and their two children to take on the directorship of the institution on 1 September 2002.

In the same year, a stray tom-cat, Rosso, came into the Blüher family at the Villa Massimo. This tom-cat appears as a literary figure in writings by Sibylle Lewitscharoff, Katja Lange-Müller, Jan Wagner and Hanns-Josef Ortheil.

When Blüher received the stipend-holders of the Villa Massimo for the first time in 2003, his motto was: The End of Sleeping Beauty's Slumber. Blüher organized many events such as summer garden parties, exhibitions, concerts and readings (including Globo d'oro events).

==== Villa Massimo Night ====
In 2007, Blüher initiated Villa Massimo Night, which takes place annually in February. The works of the stipend-holders that were made in Rome are presented in Berlin's Gropius-Bau in the form of readings, exhibitions and concerts.

==== Praxisstipendium ====
Blüher also proposed that, by means of Practical Arts Stipends, the Villa Massimo be opened up for persons who are not artists in the narrower sense but whose occupations "are aligned with the arts". These practical arts stipend-holders have included Sasha Waltz, Jim Rakete and Till Brönner, Martin Helmchen and the organ-builder Philipp Casper Andreas Klais. Further instances are stays for the typographer Friedrich Forssman, the opera director Valentina Simeonova, the art printer Till Verclas and the baker Josef Wagner made possible by awarding the stipend. Konstantin Grcic, Barbara Klemm, Stefan Sagmeister and Peter Zizka were also Practical Arts stipend-holders at the Villa Massimo.

To the present day, Blüher is the only Director of the Villa Massimo who will retire from service in the regular way after seventeen years. In 2020 he was awarded the Federal Cross of Merit on ribbon for his achievements concerning this institution.

== Publications ==
- Joachim Blüher: Egokollektiv – kollektiv ego? Geld oder Leben!, in: Egokollektiv. Peter Zizka, edited by Anna Duque y González und Matthias Wagner K, published by Buchhandlung Walther König, Cologne 2018, pp. 322–324, ISBN 978-3-96098-364-4.
- Joachim Blüher (Ed.): Villa Massimo: Deutsche Akademie Rom 1910–2010. Wienand Verlag, Köln, 2011, ISBN 978-3-86832-047-3.
- Joachim Blüher (Ed.): Villa Massimo: Deutsche Akademie Rom. Photographien von Martin Claßen, Texte von Friedrich Christian Delius, Ulla Hahn, Brigitte Kronauer, Michael Krüger, Jochen Missfeldt, Martin Mosebach, Cees Nooteboom, Arnold Stadler und Uwe Timm. Eigenverlag, 2009, ISBN 978-3-00-030017-2.
- Joachim Blüher: Mein Vater schaut aus dem Fenster, Trinker, Orangenesser. In: Georg Baselitz. Published by Hermann Schmidt, Mainz 1997, ISBN 3-87439-438-7.
- Joachim Blüher: Georg Baselitz: Malelade. Michael Werner, Köln 1990, OCLC 30308934.
- Joachim Blüher, Deutsche Akademie Rom Villa Massimo (Hrsg.): Olevano: Casa Baldi/Villa Serpentara., Published by German Academy in Rome Villa Massimo, 2017, 260 pages, order number 1568382 at the Buchhandlung Walther König
- Joachim Blüher in: Sara Moretti, (Ed): Rom auf Zeit: Villa-Massimo-Stipendiaten im Gespräch, ISBN 978-3-939431-82-4
