= Friedrich Voss (composer) =

German composer and pianist (born 1930)

Friedrich Voss (born 12 December 1930, Halberstadt) is a German composer and pianist. He was educated at the Hochschule für Musik Berlin. He won the 1955 Munich Chamber Orchestra Competition with his Concerto da camera, and subsequently won the Stuttgart Music Prize in 1960, and the Düsseldorf Schumann Prize in 1962. He was the recipient of the German Rome Prize in 1964 and again in 1977. He has composed works under commission from the Berlin Philharmonic and the Berlin Radio Symphony Orchestra. His compositional output includes the ballet Die Nachtigall und die Rose (1962); the opera Leonce und Lena (1970); many works for orchestra including five symphonies; chamber music; and choral music.
