= Jay Schwartz =

American composer (born 1965)

- Born: June 26, 1965 (age 60); San Diego, California, U.S.
- Education: Arizona State University
- Notable work: "Passacaglia - Music for Orchestra IX" • Theta - Music for Orchestra VIII • Music for Voices & Orchestra
- Awards: Bernd-Alois-Zimmermann-Preis (2000) • Rome Prize (2017, 2018)
- Website: www.jayschwartz.eu

Jay Schwartz (born June 26, 1965) is an American composer based in Germany.

== Biography ==
Schwartz was born in San Diego, California, in 1965. His father was a professional boxer who later worked in swimming pool maintenance, while his mother was a kindergarten teacher. Schwartz began playing the piano at a young age and was largely self-taught in composition. He studied music at Arizona State University, graduating in 1989 followed by graduate studies in musicology in Tübingen, Germany.

From 1992 to 1995, he worked in the archives at the Staatstheater Stuttgart, Germany. Schwartz was employed as a manual laborer, then as an archivist and later as an assistant composer for incidental music.

From 1995, Schwartz worked as a freelance composer for the Utopia orchestra, the New York Philharmonic, BBC Scottish Symphony Orchestra, the Berlin Philharmonic, Schauroun Ensemble, the Berlin Symphony Orchestra, the Helsinki Philharmonic Orchestra, the Lucerne Festival Strings, the Orchestra Sinfonica Nazionale, Tonkünstler Orchester Vienna, the Stuttgart Radio Symphony Orchestra and Choir (SWR), the West German Radio Symphony Orchestra (WDR), the Radio Symphony Orchestra Frankfurt (HR), the Mozarteum Orchestra Salzburg, the Bavarian State Opera Munich, the Salzburg Opera, the Staatskapelle Weimar, Ensemble Modern, Ensemble Intercontemporain, the Turin Philharmonic Orchestra, and the Remix Ensemble in Portugal. He was commissioned to create music to be performed by Teodor Currentzis.

His works are published and represented by Universal Edition in Vienna, London, and New York.

== Awards ==
In 2000, Schwartz received the Bernd Alois Zimmermann Prize for composition in Cologne, Germany. He is also a three-time recipient of the Strobel Fellowship for electronic music from the Südwestrundfunk.

In 2014, Schwartz was awarded a residency at the Cité internationale des arts in Paris, and he also received the Rome Prize for a residency at the Villa Massimo in Rome in both 2017 and 2018. In 2019, he was a fellow at the Civitella Ranieri Foundation in Italy. In 2020 he was awarded wit the Mario Merz Prize.

== Music ==
Jay Schwartz’s compositional approach is grounded in the physical properties of sound, incorporating elements such as the overtone series, microtonality, and glissandi. He explores tonality within the framework of what can be termed “organic harmony,” informed by acoustical physics. These sonic materials are deployed within a context that emphasizes perceptual and emotional engagement, characterized by a sustained sensuous intensity and a direct emotional expressiveness.

Schwartz organizes these acoustic phenomena into structurally coherent, deliberately extended formal frameworks that support continuous transformation and a clearly articulated dramatic trajectory. His music often evolves through unbroken developmental processes, aiming toward cathartic moments that typically crystallize into harmonically grounded thematic material. A consistent feature of his work is an emphasis on clarity, structural simplicity, and a unified timbral aesthetic.

In his sound installations, Schwartz applies similar principles. He seeks to evoke the primal or archaic qualities of sound through the use of physical and acoustical phenomena such as resonance transfer, magnetism, and infrasonic frequencies. In his piece Music for Autosonic Gongs, the instruments are not directly played but resonate autonomously via electroacoustic excitation. Despite the involvement of electronic processes in the activation, the resulting sounds are entirely acoustic in origin.

== Works ==
=== Orchestral works ===
- Three Pieces for Orchestra (2001)
- Orchestral Suite, Incidental Music to "Werther: Sprache der Liebe" (2003)
- Music for Orchestra I (2005)
- Music for Orchestra II (2007)
- Music for Voices and Orchestra (2008)
- Music for Orchestra III (2010)
- Delta – Music for Orchestra IV (2014)
- Querendo Invenietis – Music for Orchestra V (2016)
- Tonus – Music for Orchestra VI (2019)
- Credo – Music for Orchestra VII (2022)
- Theta – Music for Orchestra VIII (2023)
- Passacaglia – Music for Orchestra IX (2024)

=== Instrumental works ===
- Music for Saxophone and Piano (1992)
- Music for Vibraphone and Electronics (1993)
- Music for Piano (1994)
- Music for 3 Stringed Instruments and Piano, Incidental Music to "Die Möwe" (2001)
- Music for Five Stringed Instruments (1997)
- Music for Two Saxophones and Two Double Basses (1998)
- Music for Piano, Violin and Double Bass (2000)
- Music for Cello (2000)
- Music for 6 Stringed Instruments, Boy Soprano and Harpsichord, Incidental Music to "Triumph der Liebe" (2001)
- Music for 12 Cellos (2002)
- Music for 5 Stringed Instruments, Incidental Music to "Werther: Sprache der Liebe" (2003)
- Music for 17 Stringed Instruments (2003)
- Music for Chamber Ensemble (2006)
- Music for Eight Double Basses (2007)
- Music for Flute (2007)
- Music for Violin, Cello and Piano (2007)
- Music for 13 Cellos (2007)
- Music for Five Stringed Instruments II (2009)
- Music for Three Stringed Instruments (2011)
- M for Baritone and Ensemble (2013)
- Lament for Voice and Saxophone Quartet (2013)
- Music for String Quartet (2016)
- Music for Cello (2019)
- Lament for Voice and Saxophone Ensemble (2019)

=== Vocal works ===
- Music for Six Voices I (2006) Music for Six Voices II (2007)
- Music for Six Voices III (2008)
- Zwielicht for Mixed Choir, Three Trombones and Organ (2012)
- In Paradisum for Mixed Choir, Two Violoncellos, Two Double Basses and Organ (2018)

=== Music theater ===
- Narcissus & Echo, chamber opera (2003)

=== Sound installations ===
- Music for a Bridge (2000)
- Music for Electromagnetic Piano (2000)
- Music for Autosonic Gongs I (2001) Donaueschingen
- Music for Autosonic Gongs II (2002) International Music Conference Sweden
- Music for Autosonic Gongs III (2002) Stadthaus Ulm
- Music for Autosonic Gongs IV (2002) Akademie der Kuenste Berlin
- Music for Autosonic Gongs V (2003) City of Kaiserslautern
- Music for Autosonic Gongs VI (2003) Saint Gereon Cologne
- Music for Autosonic Gongs VII (2003) Festival Schichtwechsel Industriekultur Saar
- Music for Autosonic Gongs VIII (2005) Homunculus Tanztheater - Semper Depot Vienna
- Music for Autosonic Gongs IX (2007) Documenta Kassel XII – Music Board Saint Martin
- Music for Autosonic Gongs X (2008) Wittener Tage für Neue Kammermusik
- Music for Autosonic Gongs XI (2017) Villa Massimo Rome
- Music for Autosonic Gongs XII (2018) Villa Massimo Rome
- Music for Autosonic Gongs XIII (2019) Gropius Bau Berlin
- Music for Autosonic Gongs XIV (2021) Music Hall Cincinnati
