= Sandra Hastenteufel =

German artist

Sandra Hastenteufel (born 1966 in Stuttgart) is a German contemporary artist, who works with photography, film, sculpture and painting.

== Life ==
She studied at the State Academy of Fine Arts Stuttgart.

In 1996 she participated in a group exhibition of video art. In 2005 she was awarded the Rome Prize by the German Academy Villa Massimo, Rome. For the spring semester of 2006 she was appointed the director of the interdisciplinary Cornell in Rome Art Program.

== Work ==
Her plant portraits are original size cibachromes of sprouts in the woods. She also creates interdisciplinary projects involving ballet, classical music and opera. Her project Face to Face (Staatsoper Stuttgart /Württembergischer Kunstverein), brings together Monteverdi's opera L'incoronazione di Poppea and the work of the painter Caravaggio. She has photographed Vladimir Malakhov, Daniel Barenboim, and the King and Queen of Thailand.

Her work is held in the Daimler Collection.
