= Zsolt Gárdonyi =

German-Hungarian composer

- Born: 21 March 1946; Budapest
- Education: Franz Liszt Academy of Music Budapest and Hochschule für Musik Detmold
- Occupations: Composer; Organist; Music theorist; Academic teacher
- Organization: Hochschule für Musik Würzburg

Zsolt Gárdonyi (born 21 March 1946) is a German-Hungarian composer, organist and music theorist. He is the son of Zoltán Gárdonyi.

== Career ==
Gárdonyi was born in Budapest, Hungary. He studied composition, organ, sacred music and theory. At the age of 19 he received an award of the Budapest university competition in organ as well as composition. Aged 24 he became cantor of the Alexanderkirche in Wildeshausen, Germany. Ten years later he was appointed professor for theory of music at the Hochschule für Musik Würzburg in Würzburg. His students include Claus Kühnl, Thomas Hitzlberger, Franz J. Stoiber and Lilo Kunkel.

In international organ concerts he presents especially works of his father and his own, in addition to the standard organ repertoire. In a program at the Marktkirche he combined works of his father, the two organ preludes on "Ein feste Burg ist unser Gott" and "Ich weiß, woran ich glaube", and the Partita "Veni Creator Spiritus", with works of his own, the two organ preludes on "Erhalt uns, Herr, bei deinem Wort" and "In dir ist Freude", three compositions paying homage to composers (Hommage à J. S. Bach, Hommage à F. Liszt, Hommage à M. Dupré), his jazzy Mozart Changes and EGATOP, an homage to Erroll Garner, Art Tatum and Oscar Peterson. Several of his works were recorded. The composer comments on Grand Choeur for organ, recorded by Roland Maria Stangier in the Philharmonie Duisburg:

Organ compositions entitled Grand Choeur such as those by César Franck, Jacques-Nicolas Lemmens, Théodore Dubois, Alexandre Guilmant und Eugène Gigout are often conceived as preludes and postludes for worship services and traditionally contain registration directions at the start. In France, Grand Choeur indicates a composition whose sound is characterized by its high proportion of reed stops. My Grand Choeur is tied to this French organ tradition and was written in 1979 based on one of my worship service improvisations during 1971-75 at the organ of the Alexanderkirche Wildeshausen.

Gárdonyi's short organ piece Mozart Changes, composed for the 1995 "OK MOZART" International Festival in Bartlesville, departs from the theme of the finale of Mozart's last piano sonata in D major, K. 576, and treats it to changes using elements of jazz. Gárdonyi´s recent organ piece LIFT HIGH THE CROSS has been premiered by his son Daniel Gárdonyi on 10 February 2019 at St Albans in Hardheim.

== Awards ==
In 1979 Gárdonyi received the prize for composition of Bavaria. In June 2000 he was awarded an honorary doctorate by the Debrecen Reformed University in Hungary. In 2011 he was awarded a medal of honor by the president of Hungary.

== Publications ==
One major area of Gárdonyi's research is the harmony of the 19th and 20th century (Liszt, Debussy, Skriabin and Messiaen), resulting in a book he published together with Hubert Nordhoff, "Harmonik" (Harmony). The book was translated to Hungarian. He also researched the relation between composition, interpretation, analysis and improvisation. He published a book on counterpoint, taking Bach's fugal structures as examples. The book was translated to Italian.

- Zsolt Gárdonyi and Hubert Nordhoff: Harmonik, Wolfenbüttel 1990, ² 2002, ISBN 978-3-7877-3035-3
- Zsolt Gárdonyi: Kontrapunkt - dargestellt an Fugenstrukturen bei J. S. Bach, Wolfenbüttel 1980, ² 1991, ISBN 978-3-7877-3027-8
- Zsolt Gárdonyi: La struttura della fuga, Milano 1996, (Traduzione di A. Giacometti)
- Zsolt Gárdonyi and Siegfried Mauser: Virtuosität und Avantgarde. Untersuchungen zum Klavierwerk Franz Liszts (Virtuosity and Avantgarde. Research on the piano works of Franz Liszt), Schott Musikwissenschaft, vol. 2 of "Schriften der Hochschule für Musik Würzburg", ISBN 978-3-7957-1797-1

Music and books were published by Möseler, Walhall, Ostinato, Zimmermann, Merseburger, Bärenreiter, Heinrichshofen and Schott.

== Editions ==
Gárdonyi edited various works by César Franck and his father Zoltán Gárdonyi, such as the three motets, chamber music and compositions for organ.
