= Zoltán Gárdonyi =

Hungarian composer and musicologist

- Gárdonyi Zoltán
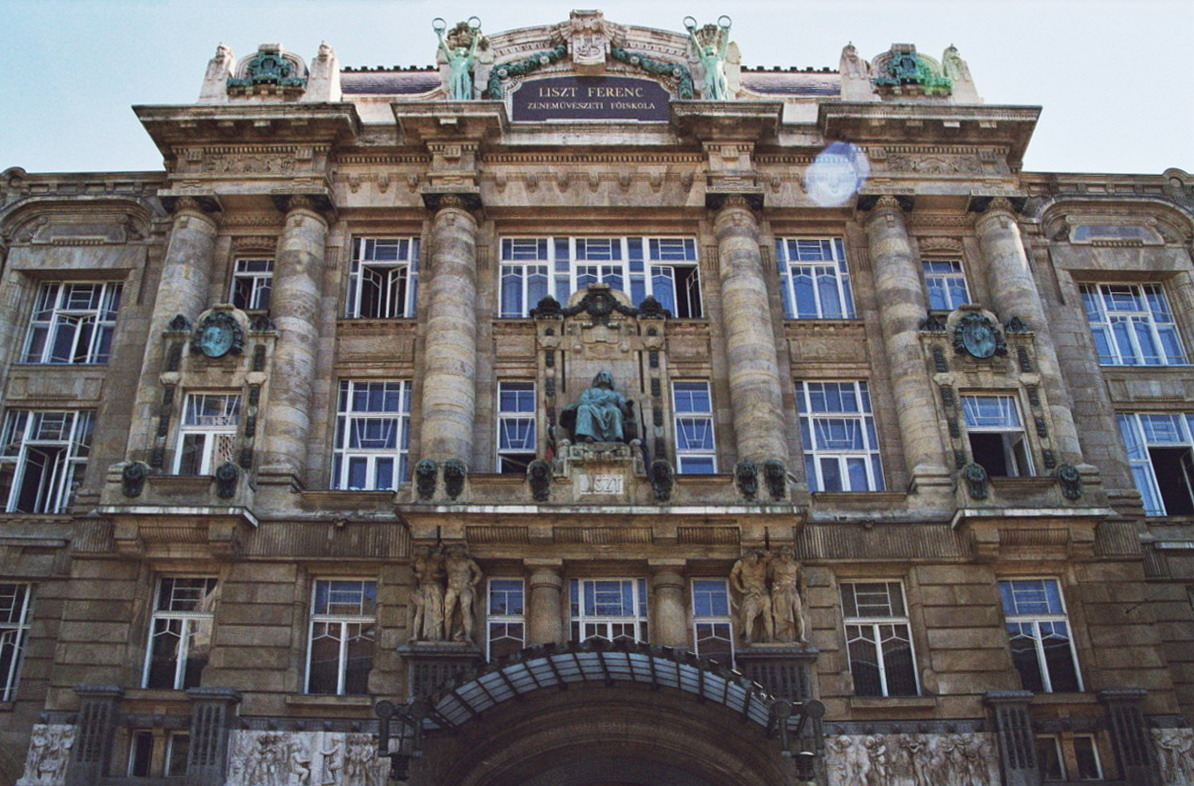
- Franz Liszt Academy of Music, where he taught for 26 years
- Born: 25 April 1906; Budapest
- Died: 27 June 1986 (aged 80); Herford
- Education: Franz Liszt Academy of Music
- Occupations: Composer; Academic teacher
- Organization: Franz Liszt Academy of Music

Zoltán Gárdonyi (Hungarian pronunciation: [ˈzoltaːn ˈɡaːrdoɲi]; 25 April 1906 – 27 June 1986) was a Hungarian composer and musicologist. He taught at the Franz Liszt Academy of Music for 26 years.

== Life and work ==
Gárdonyi was born in Budapest. His mother, the pianist Maria Weigl, studied at the Franz Liszt Academy of Music with Liszt's pupil, István Thomán, at the same time and in the same class as Béla Bartók. At the age of 17, Gárdonyi began his studies in composition with Zoltán Kodály at the Liszt Academy in Budapest. After studying with Paul Hindemith and Arnold Schering in Berlin, he taught as a professor at the Franz Liszt Academy of Music in Budapest from 1941 until 1967. He also led the faculty for Protestant sacred music until it was closed by the communists in 1949.

His oeuvre includes sacred music, orchestral works and chamber music. Three of his motets for choir a cappella were published in German by Schott, "Finnisches Busslied", "Der Herr ist mein Hirte" (Psalm 23) and "Singet dem Herren" (Psalm 96). Gárdonyi's musicological research yielded findings related to Bach and Liszt. His works were published in Germany, Hungary, Sweden and the United States. Gárdonyi lived in Germany with his family beginning in 1972. He died in Westfalian Herford a few weeks after his 80th birthday.

His son is the composer and concert organist Zsolt Gárdonyi.

== Performances and recordings ==
Some of Gárdonyi's works were recorded, including his three organ sonatas and the Partita sopra Veni Creator Spiritus, played by Dezső Karasszon, as well as several further organ works and German motets. The Partita is a symphonic organ composition, consisting of the following mouvements: introduction (Largo), theme (Lento), four variations and finale (Allegro maestoso), based on Martin Luther's hymn for Pentecost "Komm, Gott Schöpfer, Heiliger Geist".

== Publications ==
- Elemző formatan (1949, 1963, 1979, 1990), Publisher: Editio Musica Budapest, ISMN: M080039953
- J.S.Bach ellenpont-művészetének alapjai (1967), Publisher: Editio Musica Budapest
- J.S.Bach kánon- és fúgaszerkesztö művészete (1972), Publisher: Editio Musica Budapest

== Editions ==
Zoltán Gárdonyi edited the Etudes and the Hungarian Rhapsodies by Franz Liszt for the Editio Musica Budapest.

== Selected works ==
Orchestral

- Serenade No. 2 for string orchestra (1957)

Concertante

- Concerto for clarinet and orchestra (1942, 1982)
- Drei Bilder zur Karwoche (Three Images of Holy Week) for organ and string orchestra (1966)

1. Der Gang an den Ölberg (Walk to the Mount of Olives)
2. Gethsemane
3. Golgatha

Chamber music

- Rondo capriccioso for violin and piano (1941)
- Sonata for cello and piano (1944)
- Sonata for tuba and piano (1948–1951)
- Sonata No. 2 for viola and piano (1950)
- Zwei leichte Stücke (Two Easy Pieces) for violin and piano (1954, 1956)

1. Reigen (Körtánc)
2. Mädchentanz (Leánytánc)

- Two Little Rhapsodies (Zwei kleine Rhapsodien) for cello and piano (1954)
- String Quartet No. 3 (1954)
- Third Little Rhapsodie (Dritte kleine Rhapsodie) for violin, cello and piano (1955)
- Fantasie for oboe and piano (1956)
- Sonata "Il serioso ed il giocoso" for double bass and piano (1957)
- Sonatina for clarinet and piano (1959)
- Sonata for flute and piano (1960)
- Woodwind Quintet (1961)
- Fantasie über ein ungarisches geistliches Lied (Fantasy on a Hungarian Hymn) for violin and organ (1968)

Organ

- Weihnachtswiegenlied (Christmas Lullaby; Christmas Cradle Song; Karácsonyi bölcsődal) (1937)
- Tanulmányok harmóniumra (Studies for Harmonium) (1944)
- Partita sopra Veni creator spiritus (1958)
- Psalm-Fantasie über die französische Melodie des 107. Psalmes (Fantasy on Psalm 107, Geneva Psalter) (1976)
- Sonata tertia (1983)
- Drei Choralbearbeitungen (Three Chorale preludes)

1. Ein feste Burg
2. Mit Freuden zart
3. Finnisches Bußlied

- Zwei Präludien (Two Preludes)
- Meditatio in memoriam Zoltán Kodály (Meditation in Memory of Zoltán Kodály)
- Postludium

Piano

- Könnyű szonatina (Easy Sonatina; Leichte Sonatine) (1952)
- Fünf Klavierstücke nach ungarischen Volksliedern (Five Pieces after Hungarian Folk Songs) for piano 4-hands
- Fünfzehn ungarische Volkslieder (15 Hungarian Folk Songs) for piano 4-hands

Vocal

- Fünf Lieder nach Gedichten von Rilke (Five Songs on Poems by Rainer Maria Rilke) for soprano and piano (1941)

Choral

- Lobgesang nach Psalm 45 (Dicsérő ének; Song of Praise: Psalm 45) for mixed chorus, string orchestra and organ (1960) or for mixed chorus and organ (1981)
- Adeste fideles for mixed chorus and organ (1974)
- Drei Motetten (Three Motets) for mixed chorus a cappella

1. Psalm 96
2. Finnisches Bußlied
3. Psalm 23

- Drei biblische Kanons (Three Biblical Canons) for equal voices
- Du schöner Lebensbaum (You beautiful tree of life) for mixed chorus a cappella
- Danklied der Erlösten (Psalm 107) (Song of praise of the saved ones) for mixed chorus a cappella
- Ende September (End of September) for mixed chorus a cappella on a poem by Sándor Petőfi, German words by Walter Radetz
- God Is Our Refuge (Psalm 46 Isten a mi oltalmunk: 46. Zsoltár) for mixed chorus a cappella

== Literature ==
- Lavonne Harris: "A biography of Zoltán Gárdonyi and analyses of organ, string, and choral works", 356 pages, University of Oklahoma, 1992
- Anne Beloncik Schantz: "An examination of text reflection and imagery in Zoltán Gárdonyi´s FÜNF LIEDER NACH GEDICHTEN VON RAINER MARIA RILKE", 37 pages, University of North Texas, 2014
- Dezső Karasszon: "Zoltán Gárdonyi", 32 pages with complete work list, Budapest 2001, Mágus Publishing
