= Peter Kiesewetter =

Silesian classical composer

Peter Kiesewetter (1 May 1945 – 4 December 2012) was a modern classical composer, born in Marktheidenfeld, Germany to Silesian parents.
