= Detlef Heusinger =

German composer and conductor (born 1956)

Detlef Heusinger (born 1956 in Frankfurt) is a German composer and conductor. Since October 2006 he is head of the Experimentalstudio des SWR and thus the successor of André Richard.

For 1996/97, he was awarded a scholarship at the Villa Massimo in Rome.

In 2009, Heusinger founded the soloist Ensemble Experimental.

== Work ==
Source.

=== Until 1990 ===
- Ent-Fremdung. For four guitars (1978/1995)
- Todesfuge. For baritone, guitar and string quartet (1979–1980)
- Aufstieg. For chamber ensemble (1982)
- Materialermüdung. Played on two pianos for four hands (1982)
- Spiel der Zeit. Three sonnets (Gryphius) with prelude, interlude and postlude for soprano, baritone and chamber orchestra (1983)
- Stückwerk. For guitar solo (1983/1987)
- Epiphora – Oxymora – Anaphora. Three pieces for piano (1984/1986)
- Rhap-Time. For 19 instruments (1985)
- Spuren-Elemente/Trace elements. For guitar (1985)
- Von Insel zu Insel. For chamber ensemble (1985–1986)
- Der Turm. Stage music for vocal soloists, dancers, orchestra and Live-electronic, after the play of the same name by Peter Weiss (1986/1988)
- Noema. For flute and guitar (1987/1989)
- Ellipsis. For small orchestra (1988)
- Rossini a.D. Musical posse for three singers, five dancers and chamber orchestra, libretto by Heusinger using texts by Gioachino Rossini (1989–1990)

=== 1990 until 2000 ===
- Totem und Tabu. Ballet for soprano, six violoncellos and four drumers, after texts by Sappho (1991)
- Pandora I und II. For string quartet (1993–1994)
- Herzlieb I und II. Interludes on the Handel's opera Orlando for two sopranos and chamber orchestra (1994)
- Abraum. For piano trio and Live-Elektronik (1995)
- Babylon. Musiktheater in three acts for soloists Soli, large orchestra and tape. Libretto by Heusinger after Michel de Ghelderode (1995–1996)
- Schwarz – Rot – Gold. A Rühr-Schauer play about the 1848 "German revolution" 1848 for singers, dancers, actors and chamber ensemble (1997–1998)
- terra incognita. For grand orchestra (1997)
- Vorüber. For one singing voice with piano, free after text fragments from Goethe's Faust (1997)

=== 2000 until 2010 ===
- Sintflut / The Flood. Videotryptichon for three orchestra groups and five-channel tape (2000–2001)
- Ballade cruelle. For guitar solo, after Francisco de Goya (2003)
- Sakura-Saku. For guitar solo (2003)
- Drei japanische Liebeslieder (Wakas). For high voice and guitar (2003–2004)
- Kagebayashi I, II, III. Three interludes from the geza-music cycle for chamber ensemble (2004)
- 2nd anniversary of zabriskie point. Instrumental concert for electric guitar and Orchestra (2005)

=== 2010 until 2020 ===
- Tripelkonzert. 1st part for oboe d'amore, viola, verstärktes Cembalo and large orchestra (2010)
- Abraum II. For piano trio and Live-Elektronik (2011–2012)
- Ballade sentimentale. For guitar (2012)
- Sintflut X. Video opera for videotryptichon and eight-channel feed (2012–2013)
- Abzweige. For ensemble and Live-Elektronik (2013–2014)
- Klavierwerk I. For piano (2015–2016)
- Ver-Blendung. For flute, accordion and electronics (2016)
- 4 CROSSROADS. For guitar/electric guitar, violoncello/E-Bass, piano, drums, boy soprano and Elektronik (2017)
