= Roland Boden =

English footballer

Personal information
- Full name: Roland Boden
- Position: Full back

Senior career*
Years	Team	Apps	(Gls)
1909–1910	Burnley	5	(0)
- * Club domestic league appearances and goals

Roland Boden was a professional footballer who played as a full back.
