= Gerhard Müller-Hornbach =

German composer, conductor and music teacher (born 1951)

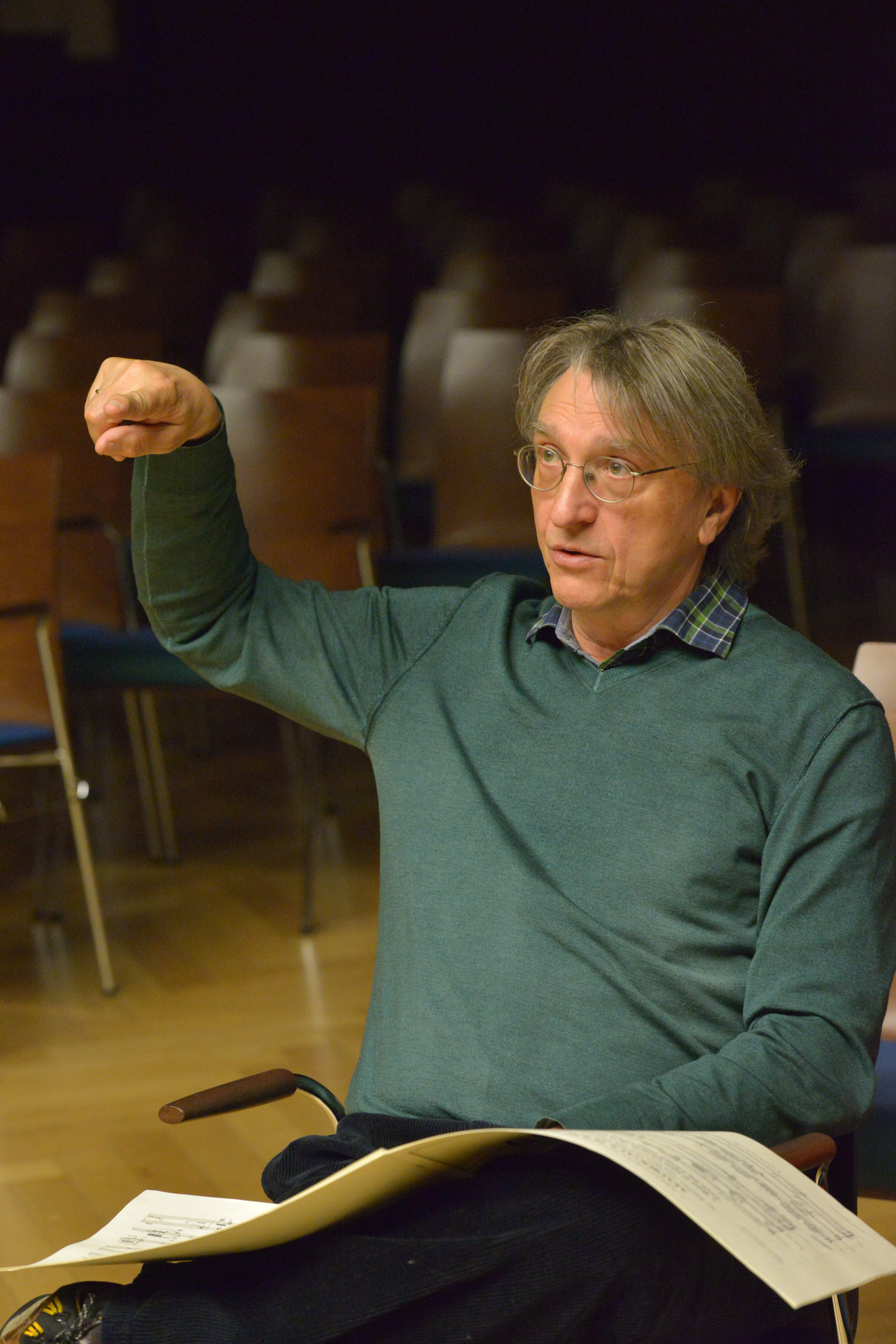
Image of Gerhard Müller-Hornbach

Gerhard Müller-Hornbach (born 26 February 1951 as Gerhard Müller) is a German composer, conductor and music teacher.

== Life ==
Müller-Hornbach was born in Hornbach. From 1981 to 2016, as a professor for composition and music theory, he taught at the Frankfurt University of Music and Performing Arts where he headed the composition department and co-founded the Institute for Contemporary Music (IzM) in 2005 of which he was director.

== Awards ==
Müller-Hornbach was awarded the Villa Massimo prize in 1983/84. In 2006 he received the Johann Vaillant Composition Prize endowed with 2500 Euro at the 6th Bergische Biennale. In 2009 he was awarded the Order of Merit of the Federal Republic of Germany by the Federal President.

== Compositions ==
- Wandlungen in D, 1976 (for orchestra)
- Piano trio, 1978 (violin, cello and piano)
- Bewegte Stille, 1985 (flute, oboe, violin, viola and cello)
- Drei Nachtstücke based on poems by Eduard Mörike, 1985 (for mezzo-soprano, baritone, Horn in F, cello and piano)
- 5 Gesänge der Schirin, 1983 (for soprano, viola d'amore and 21 strings)
- Wir sind ein Teil der Erde - Composition of sound, light and movement, 1987 (soli, choir and large orchestra)
- Passacaglia, 1980 (for orchestra)
- Gesänge der Liebe, 1985/1986 (soprano, baritone, choir and orchestra)
- Der Gesang des Danijar, 1995 (orchestra)
- Fünf zu Acht – 5:8, 1994 (vocals, dance, percussions)
- String quartet, 1985
- In Sound, 1998 (solo-cello, mezzo-soprano, 2 celli, double-bass, percussions)
- ...bis die Schatten der Nacht verdämmern..., 2003 (recorder and drums (2 bongos, 2 congas, big drum)
- Fünf Miniaturen based on poems by Robert Gernhardt, 2004 (voice, trumpet, double bass, drums)
- Sisyphos, 2006 (recorder solo)
- Vom wissenden Vergessen, 2011 (flute and percussions)
- numerous chamber music works and compositions for school ensembles (among others Wassermusik and Klangräume)
- Nur eins sei mir gewähret, 2017 (composition based on poems and diary entries by Holocaust victim Margarete Steiner, née Henschel, for soprano, flute, viola, cello, percussion), premiered on 23 January 2018 in Offenbach am Main
- Im Spiegel der Angst – auf der Suche nach Entängstigung, 2017 (Oratorio for 3 vocal soloists (soprano, tenor, baritone), 8-part mixed choir and 3 instrumental ensembles after texts by Martin Luther, Ingeborg Bachmann, Martin Luther King Jr., Khalil Gibran, Hannah Arendt, Henrik Ibsen, Gotthold Ephraim Lessing, Erich Fried, Epikur, Fernando Pessoa and from the Bible), premiered 20 October 2018 in Mainz.
