= Dekeyser&Friends Foundation =

Swiss foundation

- Formation: 2009
- Founders: Robert Dekeyser, Florian Hoffmann
- Type: Educational foundation
- Purpose: Education, Development Projects
- Headquarters: Avenue de Champel 64, 1206 Geneva, Switzerland
- Region served: Global
- Method: Donations, Grants, Volunteering
- Website: www.dekeyserandfriends.org

The Dekeyser&Friends Foundation is a foundation founded by Robert "Bobby" Dekeyser in 2009 in Geneva, Switzerland, that finances and supports projects related to social change around the world.

The Dekeyser&Friends Foundation supports existing social projects and new non-profit ideas with money, in-kind help, and knowledge. The foundation's main focus is the Compostela Village Project in the Philippines. This project in Compostela, Cebu helps people, who until recently were living on a dumpsite, build sustainable lives.

== Mission ==
The stated mission of the Dekeyser & Friends Foundation is to encourage and inspire people around the world.

== History ==
In 2009 the Dekeyser & Friends Foundation was registered in Geneva, Switzerland and officially launched at the Swiss Economic Forum. The foundation developed and set up the D&F Academy in 2009, which later emerged as an independent organization, The DO School in 2013. The foundation's inaugural project was also launched in 2009. It was called the 'Museum Challenge' and was run together with former Olympic ski racer Markus Wasmeier in Schliersee, Germany, in which an old Bavarian farmhouse was restored. A dance project followed, in collaboration with the general art director at Fire of Anatolia and choreographer Mustafa Erdogan in Turkey. Other individuals, such as primatologist Dr. Jane Goodall, former soccer player Jens Lehmann, and conductor Christoph Poppen, have also led projects for Dekeyser&Friends.

In 2010 seventeen participants supported the creation of a new village called Compostela, purpose-built for scavenger families living on the Umapad dumpsite in Cebu, Philippines. Working with social-worker and priest Heinz Kulücke, who had long engaged with questions of poverty and human rights in the Philippines, the groundwork for this rehousing project was laid. The aim of the Compostela project is to give people living on the dumpsite who want to make a fresh start the chance to make a change. The foundation's staff focuses on the importance of knowledge in breaking the cycle of poverty. With the aim of equipping the residents with the skills to lead independent lives, the families and individuals living in the village receive free healthcare, and learn skills, such as farming, animal husbandry, entrepreneurship, jewelry-making, sewing, weaving and more. The children of Compostela attend a local public school. Additional workshops on health, hygiene, and social skills are offered in the village.

In 2011 the German Ministry for Economic Cooperation and Development (BMZ) granted the necessary resources to proceed with the rehousing efforts in Cebu, Philippines. The rehousing project continues to be the cornerstone of the foundation's ongoing engagement in the Philippines.

The first ten families moved into their new village in 2012, and by spring 2013 around 500 people (mostly families) had helped build new houses and had started new lives away from the Umapad dumpsite.

== Activities ==
=== Philanthropy ===
The Foundation runs one major development project, namely the construction and management of Compostela village on the Philippine island of Cebu, which offers scavengers who want to make a fresh start a chance to build sustainable livelihoods. The Compostela Village Project was implemented in collaboration with JPIC-IDC (a local NGO), the German Karl-Kübel Foundation, DEDON Philippines, and with the support of the German Ministry for Economic Cooperation and Development, the BMZ. The Compostela Village Project began in 2010 and continues to expand.

== Founders ==
=== Robert Dekeyser ===
Robert Dekeyser is a Belgian-German founder of the outdoor furniture manufacturer DEDON, former football goalkeeper of FC Bayern Munich and founder of the Dekeyser&Friends Foundation.

== Partners ==
- Dedon
- Swiss Economic Forum
- JPIC-IDC
- Karl Kübel Foundation
- Ministry for Economic Cooperation and Development (BMZ)
- Oberson Avocats

== Advising Board ==
- Bruce Weber & Nan Bush
- Markus Wasmeier
- Tom Wallmann
- Mattheo Thun
- Richard M. Shriver
- Daniel Pouzet
- Christoph Poppen
- Adolf Ogi
- Prof. Kalypso Nicolaidis
- Alex Marashian
- Stefan Linder
- Scott Collins
- Hansi Flick
- Mustafa Erdogan
- D. & P. Frutiger
- Heinz Kulücke
- Jens Lehmann
