= D&F Academy =

- Formation: 2009
- Founders: Robert Dekeyser, Florian Hoffmann
- Type: gGmbH
- Purpose: Education, development projects
- Headquarters: Shanghaiallee 9, 20457 Hamburg, Germany
- Method: Donations, grants, volunteering
- Website: dfacademy.org

The D&F Academy was an educational institution in Hamburg, Germany that offered one-year educational programs in global issues, arts & culture and sports to young adults from around the globe between 18 and 28.

== History ==
The D&F Academy was launched by the Dekeyser&Friends Foundation in 2009 with the aim of creating a platform where successful personalities could pass on their knowledge and experience to young people from around the world in interactive learning projects. Every year the foundation allocates up to 1,2 Mio. euros for educational projects.

In 2009 the D&F Academy created its program with the support of experts advising the launch. The first pilot projects took place in Germany and Turkey, respectively; the following projects in 2010 in the Philippines as well as a Media Project, which took place across three continents. In 2011, the D&F Academy opened its representation in Hamburg, Germany. Two projects took place in Hamburg and in upstate New York. With its first regional location opened in Hamburg, Germany, the D&F Academy launched its so-called DreamMaker program in 2012. The first three project partners in 2012 include the British primatologist Dr. Jane Goodall DBE, Germany's former national goalkeeper Jens Lehmann as well as conductor Christoph Poppen.

In 2012 the D&F Academy became a non-profit GmbH, which was a subsidiary of the Dekeyser&Friends Foundation. Academies in New York City and Asia were planned.

In June 2013 the D&F Academy was restructured and became The DO School. The DO School is an independent educational organization (gGmbH) which is based on the successful aspects of the D&F Academy, though with a greater focus on social entrepreneurship education.

== Program ==
The D&F Academy offered a "new kind of education" where experienced personalities could pass on their knowledge to a group of young people, motivate and support them to turn their venture ideas into reality.

The D&F Academy brought together one mentor (Friends) and up to 20 students (Fellows) per project in experiential educational programs. Friends are leading personalities from different areas such as arts and culture, sports, business, and politics, who want to give back and pass on their knowledge and experience to the young people. The fellows are young adults aged 18 to 28 from around the world and all social classes. Each year the educational initiative organizes three projects.

The projects comprised a 10-week Challenge Phase and a 10-month Implementation Phase. In the Challenge Phase, the fellows worked on a challenge in Hamburg, given to them by their mentor, and prepared their venture ideas through the participation in the D&F start-up program. In the following ten months, the students implemented their sustainable social or ecological start-up plans in their home countries.

== Current and past projects ==
Project	Period	Location	Fellows	Friend
Museum Project	09/2009–11/2009	Schliersee, Germany	13	Markus Wasmeier: Painter, conservator, alpine ski medalist, owner of the Farmhouse Museum Schliersee
Dance Project	10/2009–12/2009	Istanbul, Turkey	13	Mustafa Erdogan: General Art Director, choreographer
Rehousing Project	04/2010-09/2010	Cebu, Philippines	16	Heinz Kulüke: Philosopher, social worker, founder of the NGO JIP-IDC
Media Project	04/2010-08/2010	Cebu, Philippines/ Manila, Philippines/ Zurich, Switzerland/ Geneva, Switzerland/ Schliersee, Germany/ London, England	1	Matthias Zuber/ Björn Hering: Director of cinema and TV documentaries/ lecturer at film schools Award-winning TV host and producer
Culinary Project	08/2011-11/2011	Hamburg, Germany	5	Tim Mälzer: Chef, TV cook
Teaching Project	08/2011-11/2011	New York City, United States	15	Sam Ross: Founder of Green Chimneys
Engage in Conservation Project	01/2012-01/2013	Hamburg, Germany	13	Jane Goodall: Founder of the Jane Goodall Institute and UN Messenger of Peace
Sports Coaching Project	04/2012-04/2013	Hamburg, Germany	15	Jens Lehmann: Former soccer player
Music Project	09/2012-10/2013	Hamburg, Germany	16	Christoph Poppen: Conductor

=== Challenges ===
In each project the students had to accomplish an interactive task during the project, the so-called "Challenge".

- Museum Project:

Restoring a 17th-century farmhouse in the German Alps utilizing original materials, traditional tools, wood-crafting and handicraft techniques.

- Dance Project:

Learning and sharing dance tradition from different cultures, as well as partaking in the dance shows of Fire of Anatolia, one of the biggest dance groups in the world.

- Rehousing Project:

Learning about community building, as well as constructing a facility to initiate the rehousing of a community of scavenger families who currently live on a dumpsite.

- Media Project:

Traveling the world to meet the Fellows of the D&F Academy, Friends and other people in search of stories. Sharing experiences in a bi-weekly IPTV show hosted on YouTube, iTunes, and on the D&F World.

- Culinary Project:

Creating a multimedia online food portal with the aim to inspire other young people around the world to care about what they eat. www.goodfoodgood.com

- Teaching Project:

Planning and building an intercultural learning center on the Green Chimneys campus.

- Engage in Conversation Project:

Developing a youth engagement project that will combine fieldwork and online elements.

- Sports Coaching Project:

Organizing a soccer tournament with youth groups from Hamburg.

- Music Project:

Creating a Music Camp Day in Hamburg with youth groups.
