= Richard Strauss Days =

Classical music festival in Germany

Richard Strauss Days Richard-Strauss-Tage
- Genre: classical music
- Date: end of June
- Frequency: annual
- Location: Garmisch-Partenkirchen
- Inaugurated: 1989; 37 years ago
- Website: Official website (in German)

Richard Strauss Days (Richard-Strauss-Tage) is a summer music festival in Garmisch-Partenkirchen, southern Germany, founded in 1989. Between 2008 and 2017, during which time the festival was headed by Brigitte Fassbaender, it went by the name of Richard-Strauss-Festival; the Semperoper in Dresden also stages a regular, separate series of events in honour of the composer that go by the name Richard Strauss Days.

Running from 21 June to 29 June, the 2025 festival included orchestral and chamber music concerts, a Lieder evening, dance projects, and master classes, long part of the programme. There is also an initiative to "document" the festival with live recordings.
