= A*Devantgarde =

Music festival in Munich, Germany

A•DEvantgarde
- Genre: Electronic music,
- Locations: Munich, Germany
- Years active: 1991–present
- Founders: Sandeep Bhagwati, Moritz Eggert
- Website: AdevantGarde.de

The A•DEvantgarde festival was founded in 1991 by Sandeep Bhagwati and Moritz Eggert. A•DEvantgarde is a music festival held every 2 years in Munich, Germany.

In 2007 the theme of the festival was on totalitarianism where the festival debuted the 60x60 project's Munich Mix featuring works with the theme of oppression and totalitarianism. In 2017, the festival will be directed by Samuel Penderbayne and Alexander Strauch under the motto 'Corragio' (courage), featuring local, national and international artists including Ensemble Nikel (Berlin/Tel Aviv), NAMES (Salzburg) and The Breakout Ensemble (Munich).

== History of the A•DEvantgarde Festival ==
"A•DEvantgarde" mixes the French words "avant" and "devant," to mean temporally and spatially progressing; an apt description of its intent. The A•DEvantgarde Festival was formed in the late 1980s by a passionate group of young German composers who wanted to break from the traditional or Darmstadt School of serial composition that was dominated by eminent new music composers of the late 20th century including Pierre Boulez, Bruno Maderna, Karlheinz Stockhausen and more.

Professor Wilhelm Killmayer championed the students' work, encouraging them to work together to present their music rather than to engage competitively for the diminutive space allotted to young composers in the larger musical venues. Professor Killmayer took on composer Sandeep Bhagwati as his teaching assistant, opening up a new level of resources for the young composer. Bhagwati put together a first series of chamber concerts aimed at presenting the work of young composers called the A•DEvantgarde and even wrote a manifesto of the A•DEvantgarde which stated the group's intention to create and promote music that is without constraints or dictates—particularly as regards serial music. The document continues to be regarded as controversial today.

The first festival was held in 1991 and met with great success; in fact, the A•DEvantgarde Festival required immediate expansion in its second year in order to accommodate the great number of attendees. The second festival in 1992 was of a larger scale and was open to composers internationally. Most importantly, it upheld the ideal that young composers should judge and decide upon the work of other young composers, and the core group went to great lengths to ensure that this process was consistently carried out.

Again outgrowing its capacity in the second year, the A*Devantgarde Festival was for financial reasons forced to scale back in 1993. This occasioned a move to the New Theater, an intimate and minimalist space in which the performances thrived.

At the New Theater the popular audience continued to grow and the Festival began to receive critical acclaim. The original founders, foremost among them Sandeep Bhagwati and Moritz Eggert, felt that they were already coming to an age where they should step aside and let the younger composers make many of the aesthetic decisions. The group opted to use a democratic method whereby all members voted on which compositions to include and how best to direct the Festival, a process that was "laborious but always rewarding."

In the following years the A•DEvantgarde Festival began to receive performances across Germany, becoming a new standard for aspiring composers.

The upcoming festival in 2017 includes a mixture of concert performances and interdisciplinary projects involving artists from the free-scene. The centrepiece of the festival will be a 3-day 'Happening' in front of the Gasteig Centre for Arts and Culture in Munich on the theme 'An Artistic Occupy'. Broadly speaking, the music of the 1% will be laid bare on the steps of the Gastieg, the 'Wall St. of Culture' in Munich, and all performances will have a focus on 'inclusion'. Other features of the festival include a 'Quodlibet' with various choirs from the local scene, an evening of premieres of works setting the poetry of Ernst Toller (and associates), and concerts by Ensemble Nikel (Berlin/Tel Aviv) and NAMES (Salzburg). The artistic directors for 2017 are Samuel Penderbayne and Alexander Strauch.

== See also ==
- List of electronic music festivals
- Live electronic music
