= Athenaeum Stade =

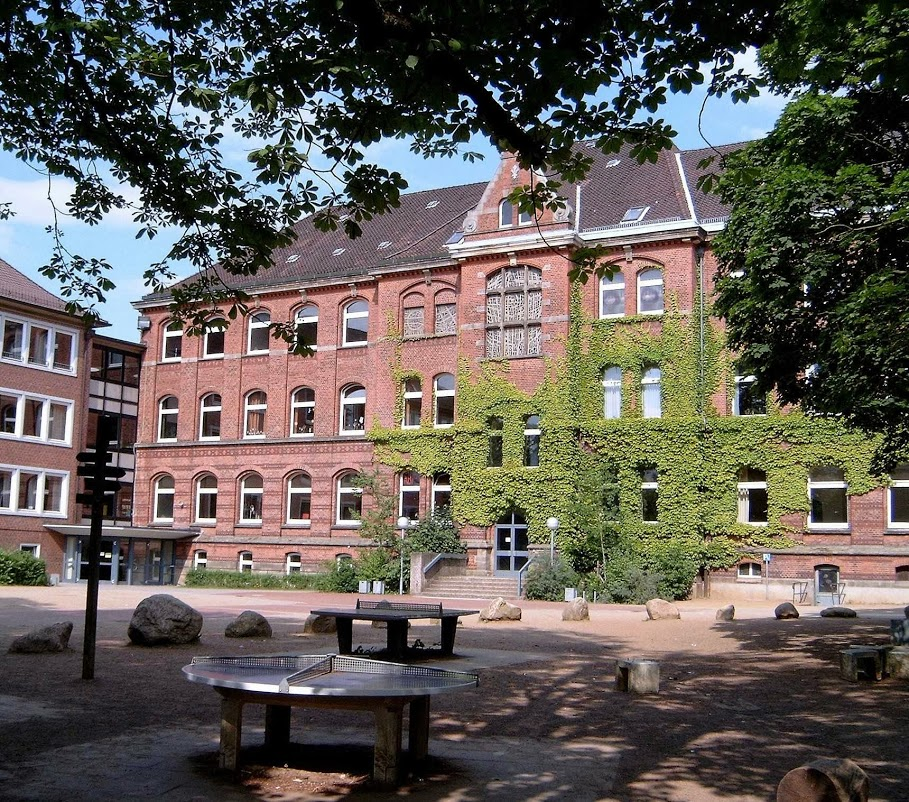
- Rear façade of the Athenaeum

Address
- Harsefelder Straße 40; Stade, Lower Saxony; Germany
- Coordinates: 53.59027°N 9.47222°E

Information
- Type: gymnasium
- Established: 1588
- Principal: OStD Martin Niestroj
- Vice-principal: StD' Elfriede Schoening
- Teaching staff: about 120 (as of 2011/12)
- Enrollment: 1321 (as of January 5, 2015)
- Website: www.athenaeum-stade.de

The Athenaeum Stade is a gymnasium, or grammar school, in the Hanseatic city of Stade.

== History ==
=== Middle Age and early modern period ===
In a written source from 1393, students of St. George's Premonstratensian monastery are mentioned for the first time. In a slightly more recent source, this monastic school is also called St. Jürgen's School. It educated sons of the clergy and over time also admitted sons of the townsfolk of Stade during the Middle Ages, who were to receive an advanced education. Many university students from that time also came from Stade. Due to the Reformation, the convent of St. George was dissolved and by about 1540, the convent school became a municipal latin school.

In 1588, the four-grade latin school converted to a seven-grade gymnasium, which was called the "Athenaeum" for the first time in 1635. Its first principal was Reiner Lange, who later became Mayor of Stade. Besides Latin, Greek, Hebrew, philosophy and theology were taught. Students from all over Northern Germany came to the Athenaeum. It was able to compete with schools from Bremen and Hamburg. In the early 17th century, the school experienced a period of prosperity, with about 300 students and a new building.

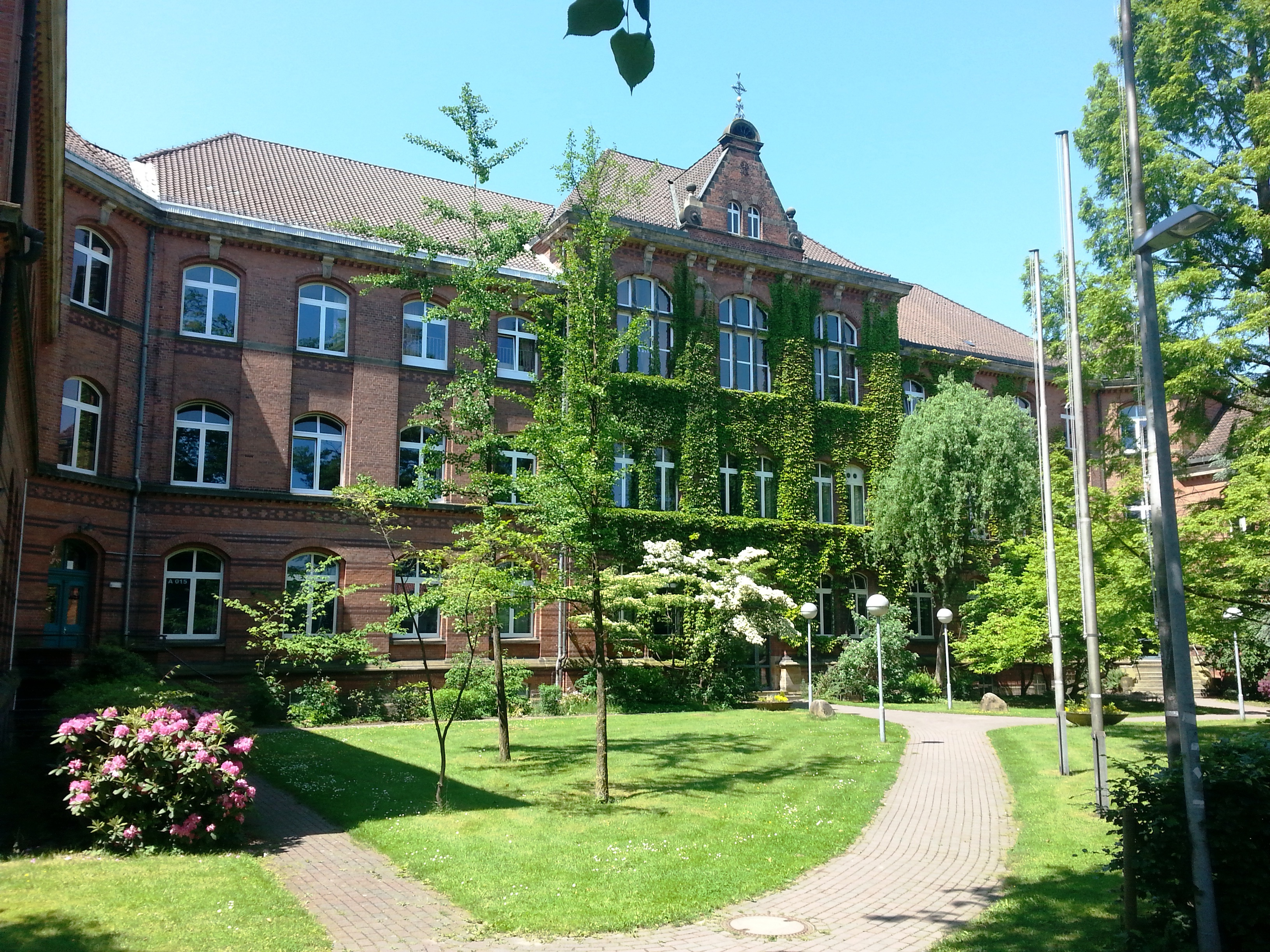
The three-winged front part (Altbau) around the forecourt towards the Harsefelder Straße

In the 1670s, the Athenaeum lost its reputation, which continued in the 18th century due to the regression of importance of Stade. In 1765, the school building burned down and was rebuilt in 1768. Despite its reorientation to more science education, the numbers of students decreased. The situation did not improve until the mid-19th century.

=== Imperial period and World War I ===
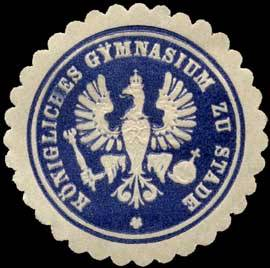
Sealing stamp of the school

In 1830, the Athenaeum introduced the opportunity to take a maturity exam, which allowed them to study at universities. About five to eight students per year were successful taking the exam, who mainly came from Stade and its vicinity. In the imperial period of Germany, the school was converted to a Royal gymnasium. The number of students increased to 242, which caused a huge lack of space, so the Athenaeum moved to the "Carl-Diercke-house".

After World War I the school lost its royal attribute, however, the school life did not really change. In 1929, the Athenaeum moved again, now into today's building on Harsefelder Straße. Thenceforth the school got the official name "Athenaeum".

=== World War II and modern times ===
During the time of the National Socialism, the gymnasium changed to an "Oberschule". Like many other German schools, it accepted the national socialist orientation, but headmaster Dr. Hans Wohltmann, who remained in office from 1929 to 1950, cared for continuity despite political upheaval.

In 1974, the Athenaeum introduced the coeducation. From 1981 to 2012, the building in the Harsefelder Straße has been expanded several times by new school buildings, a sports field and two sports halls. In 2013, the Athenaeum celebrated its 425-year anniversary with numerous events such as theme days, lectures by former students, art exhibitions and concerts.

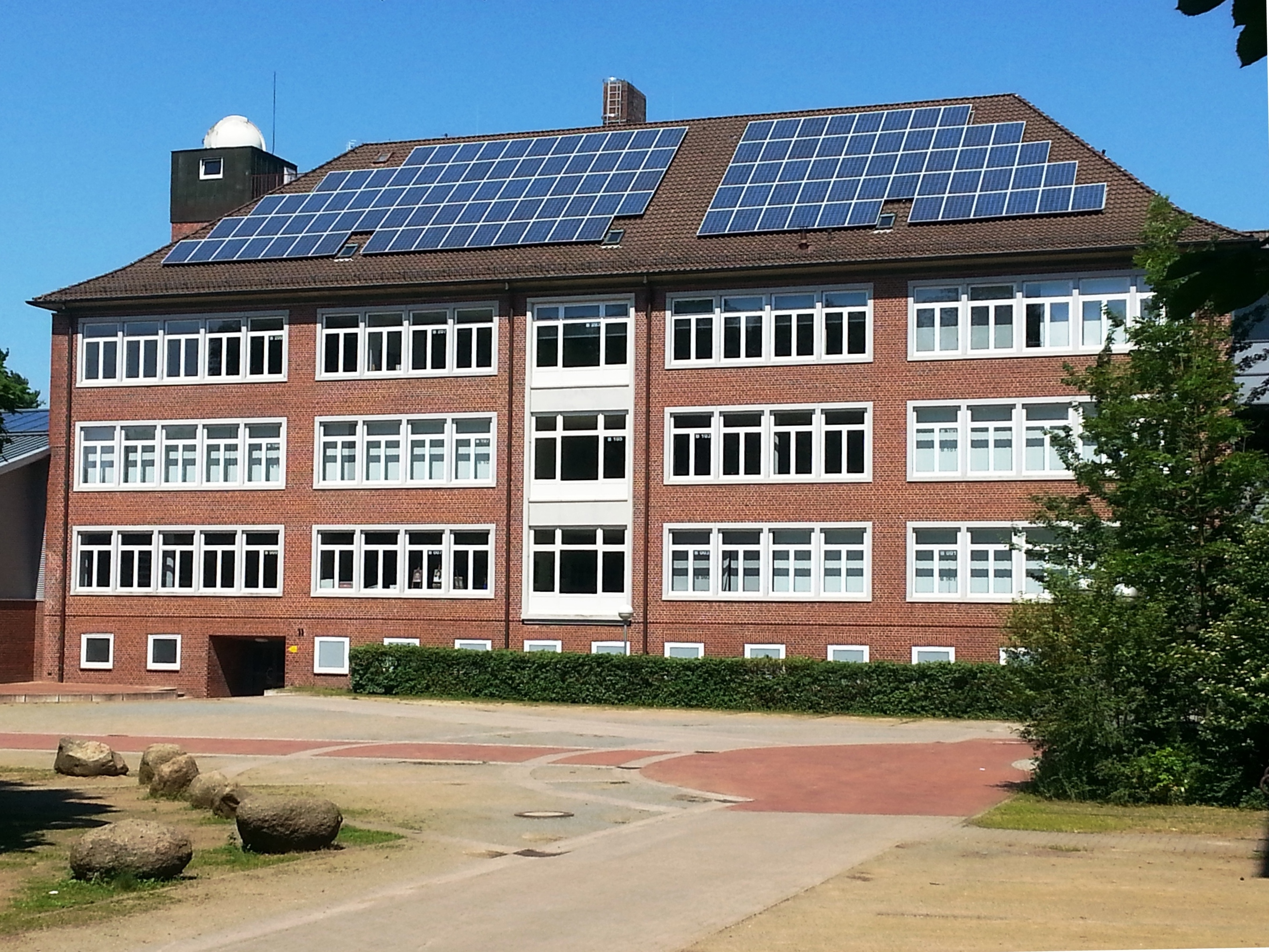
The Mittelbau of 1958 with photovoltaic system

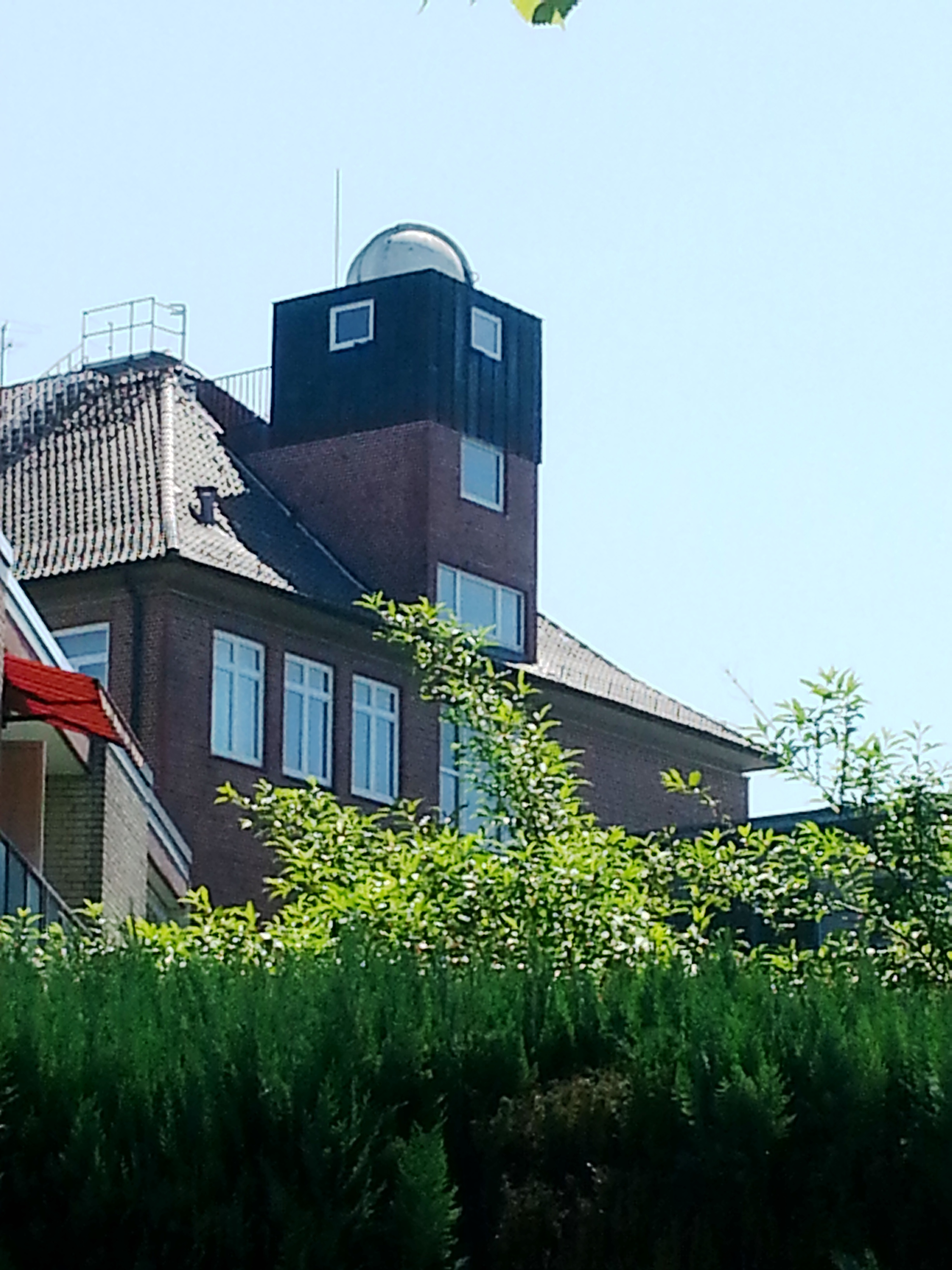
The observatory on the Mittelbau

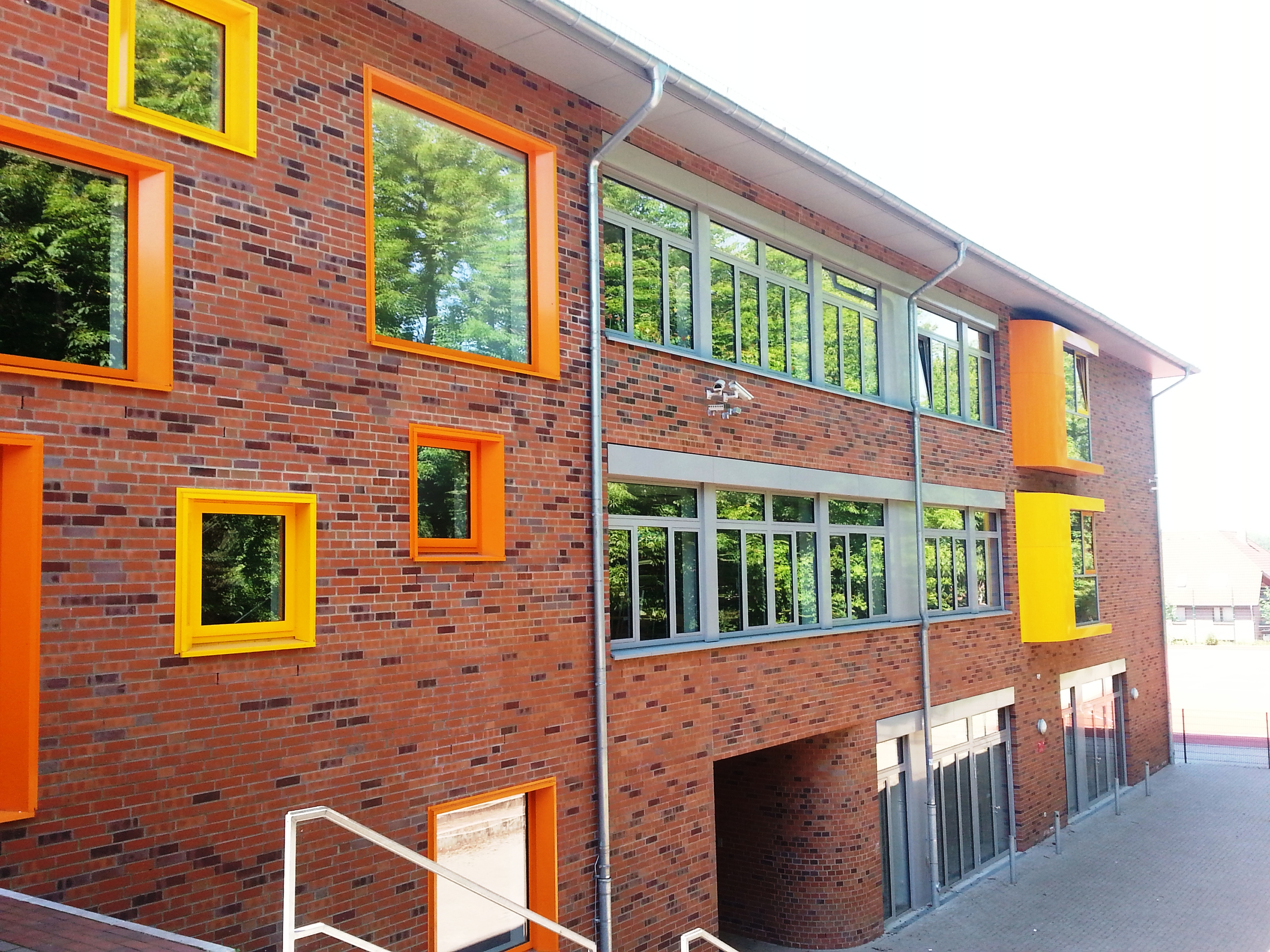
The extension part (Erweiterungsbau) of 2012

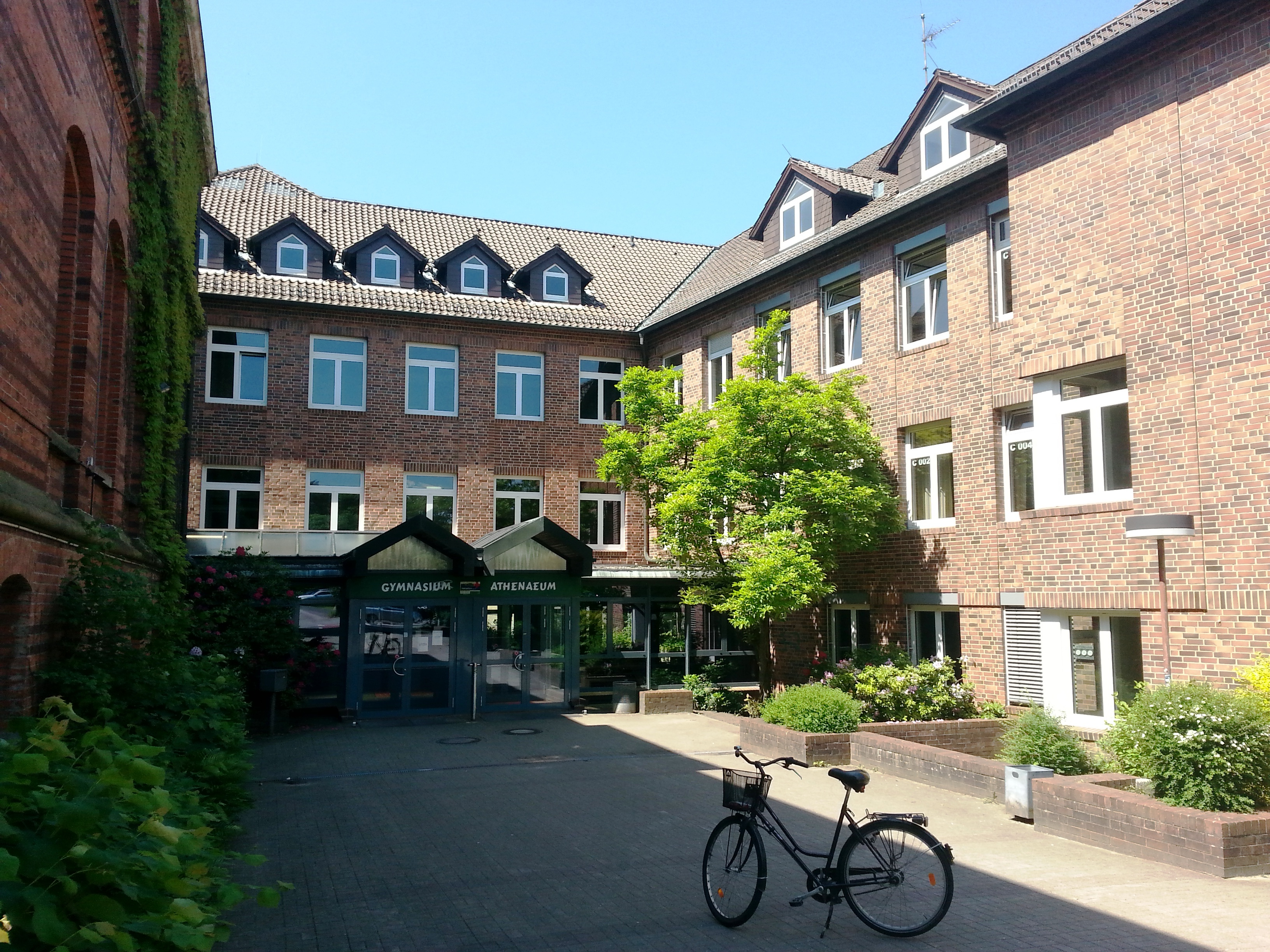
Main entrance in the Neubau part of 1982

== The Athenaeum today ==
The school grounds in the Harsefelder Straße contain besides the 1901 built main building (called Altbau) a school garden and a sports field. In 1958, a first extension (now called Mittelbau) has been officially opened, 1982 a second one (Neubau). In 1960/1962, two new sports halls with a swimming pool were built, in 2003 they were partly replaced by one big sports hall. In 2012, the construction of another new extension building (Erweiterungsbau) was completed. The current principal is Martin Niestroj.

The school's observatory built in 1966 by Dr. Karl Otto Palmer is used by the astronomy working group under the direction of Dr. Hans-Otto Carmesin. Other successful working groups are the chess working group, which is regularly participating in chess tournaments. More well-known working groups are the rowing working group, the theater working group and the school's own choir.

In 2001, the teacher Christian Schlecht (French, Ethics) was awarded in a TV show as the "Cleverest Teacher Germany".

In July 2005 an 11th grade of the Athenaeum organized a 24-hour fundraising marathon. The raised money was donated to build a school in Mali. It was the intention of the organizers to open the students for new topics and to get the local businesses into the Athenaeum. In total, 12,000 € have been collected, and the school in Mali is built. By another fundraising in December 2005, 2,500 € have been collected for an infirmary in Mali.

In Summer 2009, photovoltaic systems were installed on the school's roofs, like on other schools near Stade. This project was financed by the federal government, like many other projects, too. Thus, in 2009–2010 the IT equipment of the school was brought up-to-date. Furthermore, parts of the extension buildings has been renovated and the pavilions were replaced by another building.

In November 2010, the teacher Dr. Hans-Otto Carmesin won the Klaus-von-Klitzing-award as the "Best Science Teacher of the Year", founded by the University of Oldenburg. Dr. Carmesin invested the prize money in the school's observatory.

Since September 2012, the new extension building of the Athenaeum is in use. In 2013, another building destroyed by a water damage has been completely renovated, so the rooms of the Realschule Camper Höhe are no longer needed.

In November 2013, Dennis Roeder, English and history teacher at the Athenaeum, was awarded with the "German Teacher Prize 2013" for his extraordinary educational involvement.

== Notable students ==
- Stefan Aust (born 1946), former editor-in-chief of the magazine Der Spiegel
- Sandeep Bhagwati (born 1963), German-Indian composer, artist, curator and author
- Juergen Fitschen (born 1948), member of the Management Board of the Deutsche Bank
- Enno Hagenah (born 1957), German politician (Green)
- Heinrich Hellwege (1908–1991), former Prime Minister of Lower Saxony
- Christian Graf von Krockow (1927–2002), publicist
