= Munich Chamber Orchestra =

German chamber orchestra

Münchener Kammerorchester Munich Chamber orchestra
- Chamber orchestra
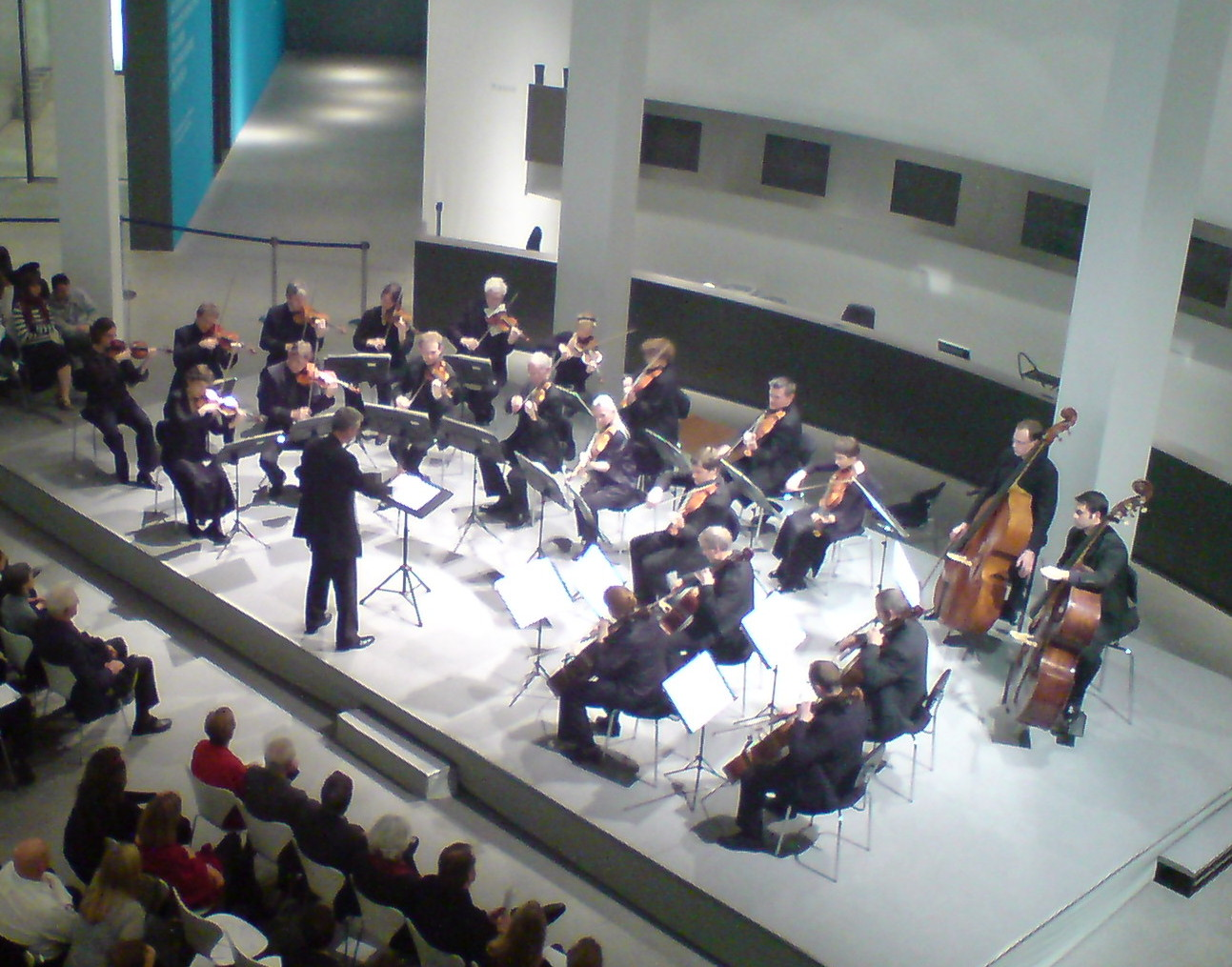
- The orchestra in concert at the Pinakothek der Moderne, 2008
- Short name: MKO
- Founded: 1950 by Christoph Stepp
- Location: Munich, Germany
- Website: www.m-k-o.eu/en/

The Munich Chamber Orchestra (German: Münchener Kammerorchester, or MKO) is a German chamber orchestra based in Munich. Its primary concert venue is the Prinzregententheater, Munich. The MKO also gives concerts in Munich at such venues as the Pinakothek der Moderne and the Schwere Reiter, and at the Muffathalle during the Munich Biennale.

== History ==
Christoph Stepp founded the MKO in 1950. Hans Stadlmair was the artistic director from 1956 to 1995, and conducted the orchestra in over 4000 concerts, including international tours and collaborations with the Bayerischer Rundfunk. From 1995 to 2006, Christoph Poppen was principal conductor of the MKO. Alexander Liebreich has been the principal conductor and artistic director from 2006 until 2016. Clemens Schuldt has been principal conductor since the 2016/17 season.

The MKO has regularly commissioned music from such contemporary composers as Erkki-Sven Tüür, Georg Friedrich Haas, Thomas Larcher, Iannis Xenakis and Wolfgang Rihm, among others. In 1971 the orchestra premiered Wilhelm Killmayer's fin al punto, composed for its 20th anniversary. The MKO and the Philharmonie Essen commissioned Jörg Widmann's ad absurdum, Concerto for trumpet in B♭ and small orchestra, which premiered on 18 January 2006 with soloist Sergei Nakariakov. In 2010 the orchestra premiered Peter Ruzicka's TRANS.

== Awards ==
The MKO was awarded the Musikpreis der Landeshauptstadt München in 2000, the prize for the best concert programming from the Deutscher Musikverleger-Verband (German association of music publishers) for the seasons 2001/02 and 2005/06, the Cannes Classical Award in 2002, the Prize of the Christoph and Stephan Kaske Foundation in 2002 with Christoph Poppen, the Ernst von Siemens Förderpreis in 2001 to 2003. In 2008, the Bayerische Akademie der Schönen Künste awarded the prize Neues Hören (New Listening) of the foundation Neue Musik im Dialog (New Music Dialogue) for the successful delivery of contemporary music to the chamber orchestra.

== Recordings ==
- Karl Amadeus Hartmann: Funèbre, with Isabelle Faust (violin), Paul Meyer, Petersen String Quartet, conducted by Christoph Poppen, ECM New Series (2000)
- Sofia Gubaidulina: Sieben Worte / Zehn Präludien / De Profundis, with Elsbeth Moser (bayan), Boris Pergamentschikow (cello), conducted by Christoph Poppen ECM New Series (2002)
- Bach / Webern: Ricercar, including Bach cantata Christ lag in Todes Banden, BWV 4, with the Hilliard Ensemble, conducted by Christoph Poppen, ECM New Series (2003)
- Tigran Mansurian: Monodia, with Kim Kashkashian, Leonidas Kavakos, Jan Garbarek, Hilliard Ensemble, conducted by Christoph Poppen, ECM New Series (2004)
- Barry Guy: Folio, with Maya Homburger (baroque violin), Muriel Cantoreggi (violin), Barry Guy (double bass), conducted by Christoph Poppen, ECM New Series (2005)
- Giacinto Scelsi: Natura Renovatur, with Frances-Marie Uitti, conducted by Christoph Poppen, ECM New Series (2006)
- Valentyn Sylvestrov: Bagatellen und Serenaden, with Valentyn Sylvestrov and Alexei Lubimov (piano), conducted by Christoph Poppen, ECM New Series (2007)
- Haydn / Yun: Farewell conducted by Alexander Liebreich ECM New Series (2008)
- Neharót, works of Betty Olivero, Tigran Mansurian, Komitas and Eitan Steinberg, with Kim Kashkashian, conducted by Alexander Liebreich ECM New Series (2009)
- Madhares, works by Thomas Larcher for piano and orchestra with Till Fellner, for viola and chamber orchestra with Kim Kashkashian, conducted by Dennis Russell Davies ECM New Series (2010)
- Toshio Hosokawa: Landscape, with Mayumi Miyata (shō), conducted by Alexander Liebreich ECM New Series (2011)
- Fauré: Requiem, with Chor des Bayerischen Rundfunks, conducted by Peter Dijkstra Sony Classical (2011), rewarded with ECHO KLASSIK 2012
- Rossini: Ouvertures, conducted by Alexander Liebreich Sony Classical (2011)
- Der Charme der Oboe, works by Cimarosa, Bellini etc., with François Leleux (oboe), Daniel Giglberger (concertmaster) Sony Classical (2012)
- Nikolaus Brass: Zeit im Grund / Von wachsender Gegenwart, with Beate Zelinsky, David Smeyers (clarinet), conducted by Alexander Liebreich NEOS (2013)
- W. A. Mozart: Great Mass in C minor, K. 427, with Chor des Bayerischen Rundfunks, conducted by Peter Dijkstra Sony Classical (2013)
- W. A. Mozart: Requiem, with Chor des Bayerischen Rundfunks, conducted by Alexander Liebreich, Sony Classical (2014)
- W. A. Mozart: Flötenkonzerte, with Magali Mosnier (flute), Daniel Giglberger (concertmaster) Sony Classical (2015)
- Mendelssohn: Sommernachtstraum / Symphony No. 4, with Chor des Bayerischen Rundfunks, conducted by Alexander Liebreich Sony Classical (2015)
- Haydn / Hummel: Prince Esterházy Concertos, with François Leleux (oboe), Daniel Giglberger (concertmaster) Sony Classical (2015)
- Cello Concertos by Haydn / W. A. Mozart/Cassadó, C.P.E. Bach, with Valentin Radutiu (cello), conducted by Stephan Frucht hänssler classic (2016)
- Anton & Paul Wranitzky with Veriko Tchumburidze (violin), Chiara Enderle (cello), conducted by Howard Griffiths Sony Classical 2016
- Tigran Mansurian: Requiem, with RIAS Kammerchor, Alexander Liebreich ECM New Series (2017)
- Franz Danzi, with Nareh Arghamanyan (piano), Aurélien Pascal (cello), conducted by Howard Griffiths Sony Classical / BR-Klassik 2017
- Milica Djordjević: rocks – stars – metals – light, i.a. conducted by Clemens Schuldt, col legno / BR-Klassik (2017)
- Concertante! Les Vents Français, Daniel Giglberger (concertmaster) Warner
- Classics / BR-Klassik (2018)
- Georg Katzer – Friedrich Goldmann, with Clemens Schuldt, NEOS Music (2021)
- Haydn – Cello Concertos in C & D mit Christian Poltéra, BIS Records (2022)
- J. C. Bach – J. M. Haydn, with Sophie Dervaux und Clemens Schuldt, Berlin Classics/BR-Klassik (2022)
- Thomas Larcher: The Living Mountain, with Sarah Aristidou, Alisa Weilerstein, Aaron Pilsan, Luka Juhart und Clemens Schuldt, ECM (2023)
- Gloria Coates: Time Frozen – works for chamber orchestra, wit Jessica Niles und Ilan Volkov, NEOS Music (2023)
- Beethoven: The Piano Concertos, with Alexander Lonquich ECM (2024)
- Pēteris Vasks: In Evening Light, with Sebastian Bohren, Avie (2024)
- Mozart – Serenata: Eine kleine Nachtmusik, Posthorn und Haffner Serenade, with Isabelle Faust and Enrico Onofri, Harmonia Mundi (2025)

== Principal conductors ==
- Hans Stadlmair (1956–1995)
- Christoph Poppen (1995–2006)
- Alexander Liebreich (2006–2016)
- Clemens Schuldt (2016–2022)

=== Associated conductors ===
- Jörg Widmann (2022–present)
- Enrico Onofri (2022–present)
- Bas Wiegers (2022–present)
