= Florian Hoffmann =

German social entrepreneur (born 1981)

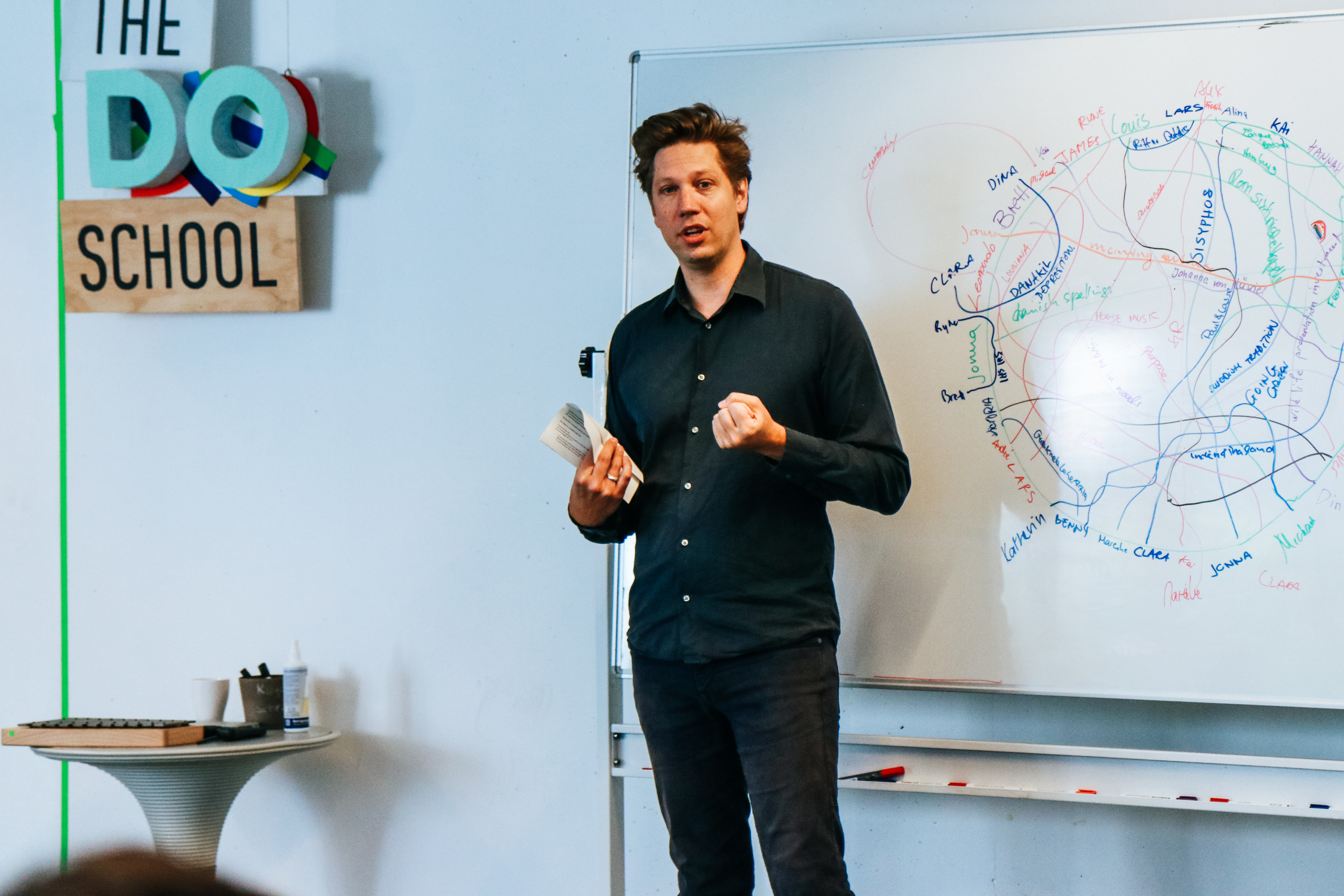
- Hoffmann during a keynote on sustainable trade in 2019
- Born: 1981 (age 44–45); Nagold, West Germany

Florian Hoffmann is a German social entrepreneur, author, investor and founder of The DO School. He speaks on topics including the green business transformation, innovation, and the future of lifelong learning.

== Early life and education ==
Florian Hoffmann grew up in Germany and Spain.

He studied at the European College of Liberal Arts, Duke University, Humboldt University and St Antony's College, Oxford. At Oxford, Florian Hoffmann worked with Kalypso Nicolaidis, Timothy Garton-Ash and Michael Freeden researching a common European Value Pluralism.

== Career ==
In 2008, Hoffmann co-founded the Dekeyser&Friends Foundation in Geneva, together with entrepreneur and former footballer Bobby Dekeyser. From 2009 until 2012, Hoffmann worked as a creative strategist at furniture company DEDON and co-founded DEDON Island, an island resort and social business supporting sustainable tourism in the Philippines.

In 2013, he founded The DO, an educational institution offering programs for social entrepreneurs, as well as executive consulting programs. The DO operates in three different continents with offices in Berlin, Hong Kong, Hamburg, and New York City.

== Publications ==
Hoffmann's book Our New World ("Die Neue Welt") was published in English and German by Murmann Verlag in 2022.

His second book, "5 Gründe warum die Welt nicht untergeht", is scheduled to be published in 2024 by Rowohlt Verlag in Kooperation mit dem Brand Eins Verlag.

His work has been covered in publications including the Financial Times, The Wall Street Journal, New York Times, The Guardian, and Monocle (media company).

In 2019, Hoffmann was one of several prominent Germans to sign an open letter encouraging the UK not to leave the European Union, published in the Times.

== Miscellaneous ==
Hoffmann played competitive handball in the German youth league and was listed at the European Handball Federation.

== Engagements and awards ==
The World Economic Forum named Hoffmann a Young Global Leader in 2017.

The DO School was named an outstanding educational platform by the "Germany - Land of Ideas" initiative in 2016.

Hoffmann is a fellow of the Disruptor foundation by Craig Hatkoff and Clayton Christensen.

Hoffmann is a member of the judging academy of the Global Teacher Prize.

He also serves as a jury member for the German Sustainability Award.
