= Musikpreis der Landeshauptstadt München =

German music award

The Musikpreis der Landeshauptstadt München (Music Prize of the City of Munich) is an award, awarded since 1992, initially every two years but since 2000, every three years, alternating with the Theaterpreis and the Tanzpreis. The music prize rewards the outstanding work of artists or ensembles which have contributed to Munich to the reputation of Munich as a music city. The award is worth €10,000.

== Winners ==
- 1992: Klaus Doldinger
- 1994: Hans Stadlmair
- 1996: Josef Anton Riedl
- 1998: Manfred Eicher
- 2000: Münchener Kammerorchester
- 2003: Wilhelm Killmayer
- 2006: Brigitte Fassbaender
- 2009: Nikolaus Brass
- 2012: Jazzclub Unterfahrt
- 2015: Duško Gojković
- 2018: Eva Mair-Holmes
- 2021: Jörg Widmann
- 2024: Salome Kammer
