= Jazzclub Unterfahrt =

Jazz club in Munich, Germany

Coordinates: 48°8′8″N 11°36′4″E

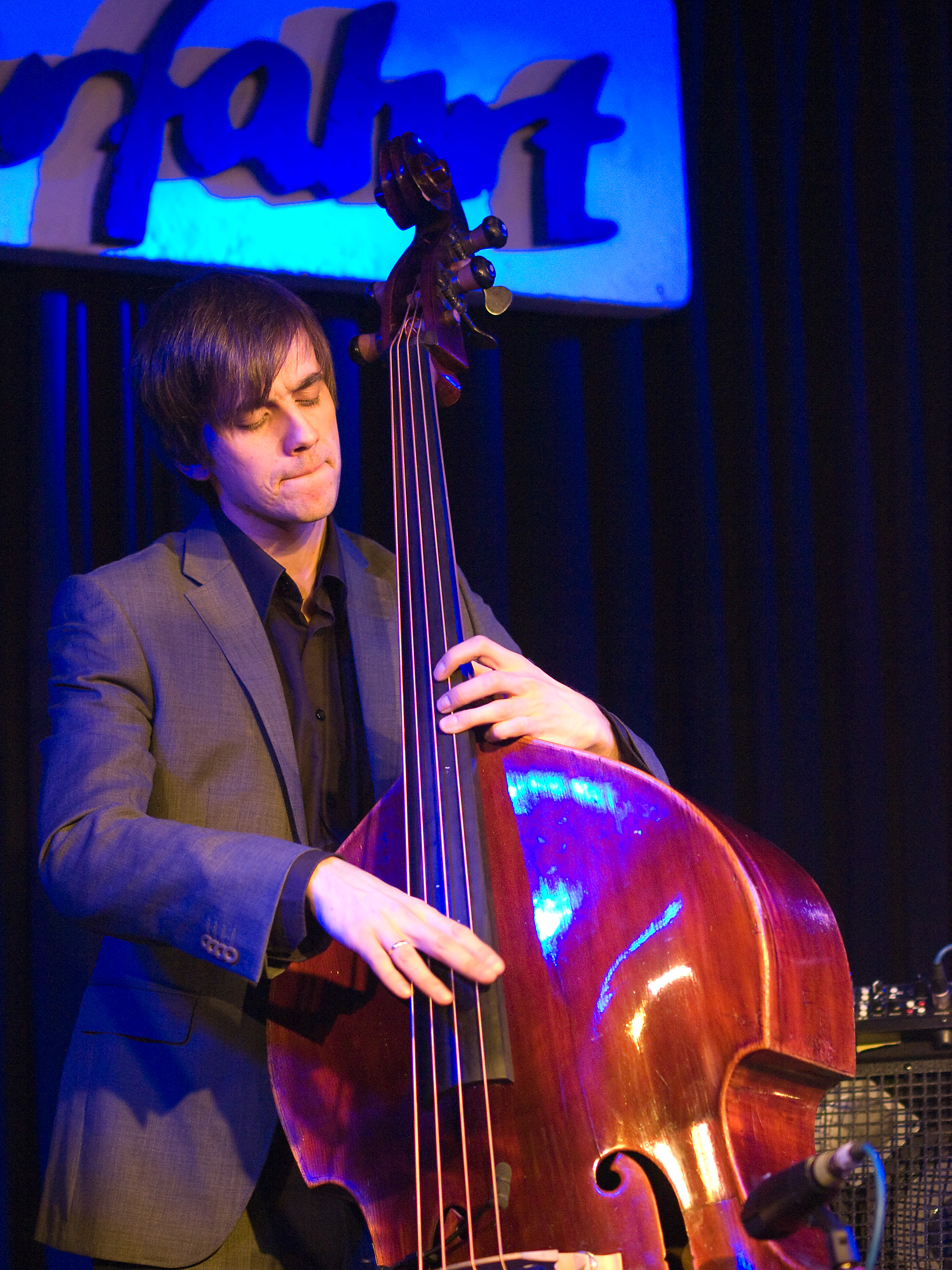
Bassist Audun Ellingsen with saxophonist Frøy Aagre live at the Jazzclub Unterfahrt in 2010

Jazzclub Unterfahrt is a jazz club at Einsteinstraße 42 in Munich, Germany, described by Lonely Planet as "perhaps the best-known place in town, with live music". The club has over 1,200 members, though only has a capacity of about 180 people. The venue is in the old beer cellars of a former restaurant.

== History ==
The club was established in 1978, when five people converted an old restaurant for railway workers into a jazz club. The name "Unterfahrt" or subway denotes the passage under the railway where it was originally situated. The new club was focused on free jazz, and by the 1980s it was open five days a week. In 1994 it began featuring seven concerts a week.

In 2012 the club won the Musikpreis der Landeshauptstadt München.

Today the site as a whole is known as the "Einstein" after the street on which it is located. The cellars cover a total area of 2,000 square metres (22,000 sq ft) and include four separate halls, each covering an area of 188 square metres (2,020 sq ft). In addition to the Jazzclub Unterfahrt, it houses the KiM Cinema and serves as a venue for music and theatre groups.
