= Sandeep Bhagwati =

German composer

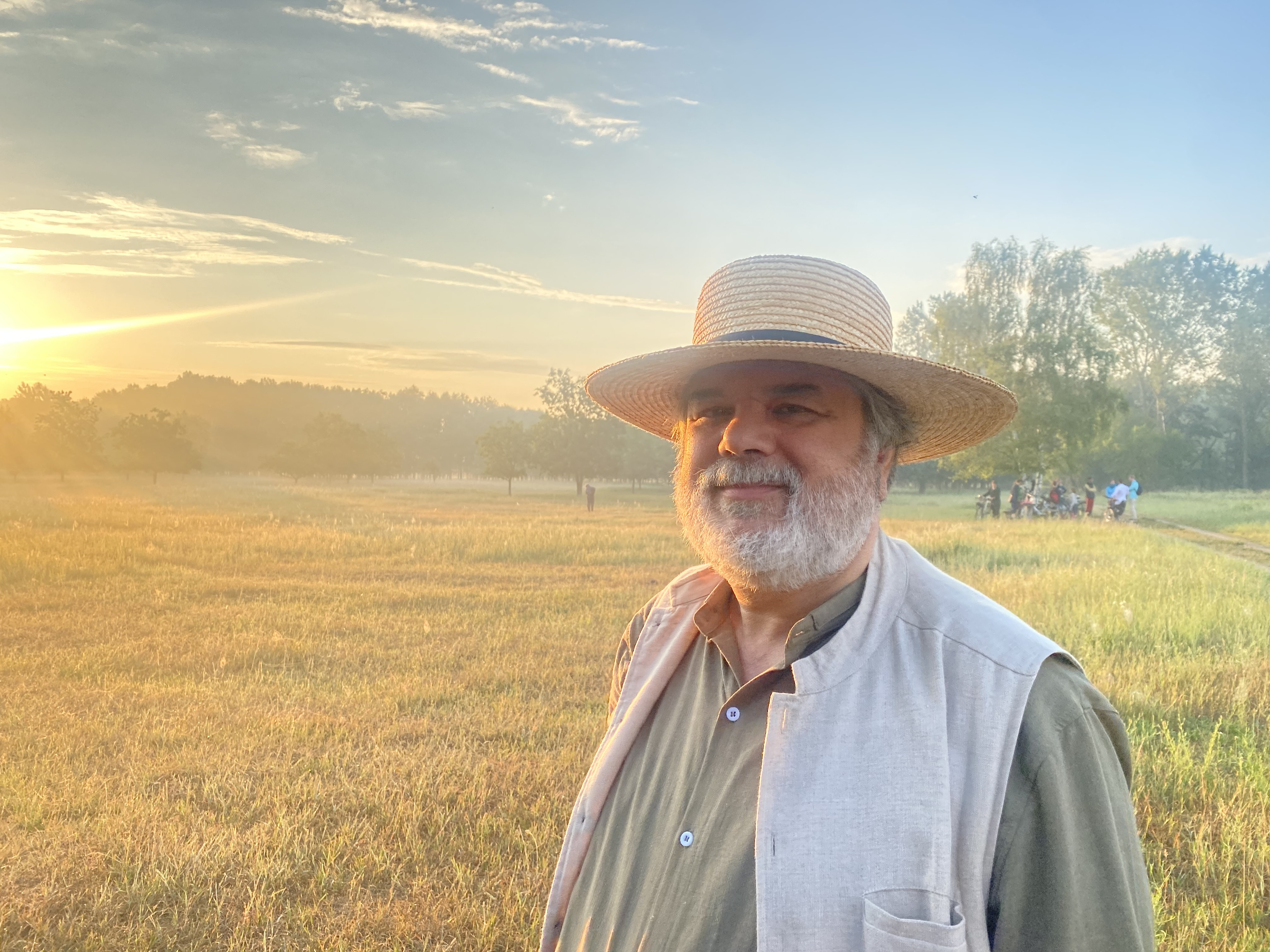
- Sandeep Bhagwati in 2022 (photo by Deniza Popova)
- Born: 4 June 1963 (age 63); Bombay, India
- Education: Athenaeum Stade; Mozarteum University; Musikhochschule München
- Occupations: Composer; Academic teacher
- Organizations: Musikhochschule Karlsruhe; Concordia University
- Website: http://matralab.hexagram.ca/

Sandeep Bhagwati (born 4 June 1963) is a German composer of western classical music and an academic teacher.

== Career ==
Bhagwati was born in Bombay, Maharashtra, to a German mother and an Indian father. Living in Germany since the age of five, Bhagwati went to school at the Athenaeum Stade in Stade, Lower Saxony, and studied from 1984 to 1987 at the Mozarteum in Salzburg with teachers such as Boguslaw Schaeffer, Kurt Prestel, Walter Hagen-Groll, Kurt Maedel, Josef Maria Horváth and Rupert Huber. Bhagwati studied composition at the Hochschule für Musik und Theater München in Munich with Wilhelm Killmayer, and took master classes with Killmayer and Hans-Jürgen von Bose, and with Edison Denisov at the Lucerne Festival of 1991. He studied computer music for one year at IRCAM. He studied further with Brian Ferneyhough and Tristan Murail.

From 1989 to 1991 Bhagwati organized a chamber concert series "KammerMusikUtopien" at the Gasteig in Munich. He was a co-founder, with Moritz Eggert, of the festival A*Devantgarde in 1991. From 1990 to 1992, together with Gerd Kühr, he was artistic director of the composers' workshop "AmateurKomponistenWerkstatt" of the Munich Biennale, which had been established by Hans Werner Henze. Bhagwati's opera in five acts Ramanujan with his own libretto on the life of the Indian mathematician Srinivasa Ramanujan (1887–1920) was premiered at the Munich Biennale in 1998, as a co-production with the Staatstheater Darmstadt and IRCAM, in collaboration with the "Bayerische Theaterakademie" at the Prinzregententheater. "[The story of Ramanujan could] be used almost without any changes by a scriptwriter for a film", said his British colleague B. M. Wilson in the 1930s.

Bhagwati's works were awarded prizes such as the Europäischer Kompositionspreis of the Academy of Arts, Berlin and the Ernst-von-Siemens Förderpreis. From 1995 to 1998 he worked at the IRCAM. In 1998 he was a guest composer at the Center for Art and Media Karlsruhe, in 1998/99 at the "Zentrum für Kunst und Medientechnologie" Institute of Electronic Music and Acoustics in Graz. and for the Beethoven Orchester Bonn.

Bhagwati was from 2000 to 2003 professor of composition at the Musikhochschule Karlsruhe. Since 2006 he has held the Canada Research Chair in Inter-X Art Practice and Theory at the Faculty of Fine Arts of the Concordia University in Montreal.
