= Moritz Eggert =

German composer and pianist

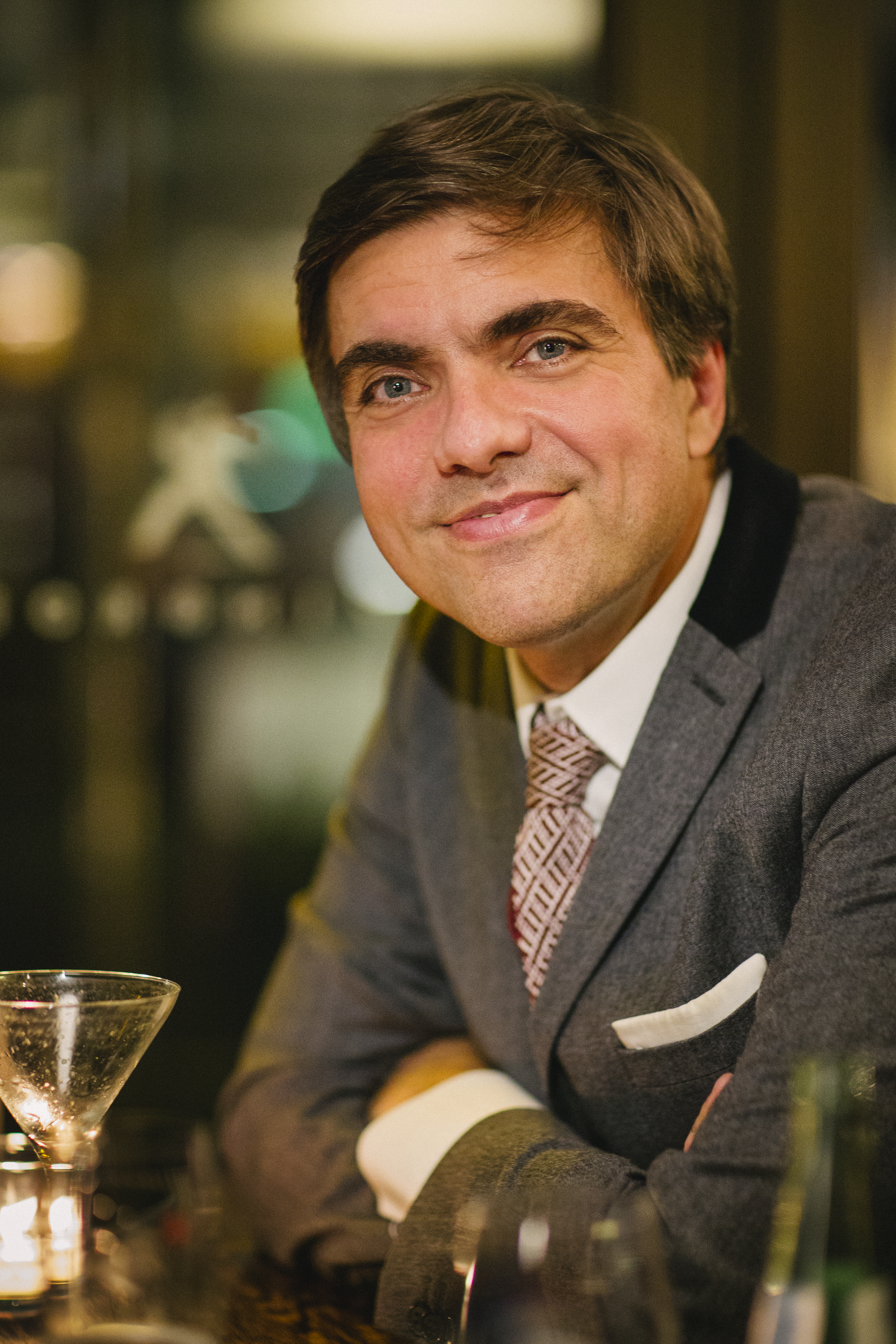
Moritz Eggert (2016)

Moritz Eggert (born 25 November 1965 in Heidelberg) is a German composer and pianist.

== Life ==
Moritz Eggert began his studies in piano and composition in 1975 at Dr. Hoch's Konservatorium in Frankfurt (with Wolfgang Wagenhaeuser and Claus Kühnl), at the Frankfurt University of Music and Performing Arts (with Leonard Hokanson) and at the University of Music and Performing Arts Munich (with Wilhelm Killmayer). Later he continued his piano studies with Raymund Havenith and Dieter Lallinger, and his composition studies with Hans-Jürgen von Bose in Munich. In 1992 he spent a year in London as a post-graduate composition student with Robert Saxton at the Guildhall School of Music and Drama.

Moritz Eggert's oeuvre includes 7 operas as well as ballets and works for dance and music theatre, often with unusual performance elements. In 1997, a German TV station produced a feature-length film portrait about his music.

As a pianist he has collaborated with many artists, as soloist with orchestra, as chamber music partner in various formations and as a Lied accompanist. In 1996 he presented the complete works for piano solo by Hans Werner Henze for the first time in one concert. In 1989 he was a prize winner at the International Gaudeamus Competition for Performers of Contemporary Music.

As a composer Moritz Eggert has been awarded with the composition prize of the Salzburg Easter Festival, the Schneider-Schott Music Prize, the "Ad Referendum"-prize in Montréal, the Siemens Förderpreis for young composers, and the Zemlinsky Prize. 2003 he became a member of the Bayerische Akademie der Schönen Künste.

In 1991 he founded – together with Sandeep Bhagwati – the A*Devantgarde festival for new music. The festival continues today as a biennial and is directed by Alexander Strauch and Samuel Penderbayne, the next edition having the motto 'Corragio' (courage).

His concert-length cycle for piano solo, "Haemmerklavier", is among his best known works.

Moritz Eggert has written 7 operas and several more works for music and dance theatre. In 2004, his opera "The Snail" was premiered in Mannheim (directed and written by Hans Neuenfels).

His large "soccer oratorio" for the Ruhrtriennale 2005 and the Soccer World Championship in Germany 2006 experienced widespread media coverage in German as well as foreign media.

Moritz Eggert created the opening ceremony for the 2006 FIFA World Cup (together with director Christian Stueckl and stage designer Marlene Pohley).

Eggert is (as of 2018) a regular contributor to the "Bad Blog of Musick" on the website of the Neue Musikzeitung.

Since 2010 Moritz Eggert is professor for composition at the Hochschule für Musik und Theater München.

== Cultural interests ==
Eggert is an avid board game player, and was at one point a contributor to The Dice Tower podcast, a podcast about all aspects of boardgaming, and also the podcast "Point 2 Point," a gaming podcast that focuses exclusively on wargames.

== Works ==
=== Opera and music theatre ===
- Das Mahl des Herrn Orlong (Oper für Schauspieler, 1988)
- Paul und Virginie (Puppenoper, 1990)
- Wir sind daheim (Kammeroper, 1991, 1998)
- Lunu (Abstrakte Oper 1992)
- Helle Nächte (Große Oper, 1997)
- Der Andere (Kurzoper, 2000)
- Dr. Popels fiese Falle (Children's Opera, 2002)
- The last days of the V.I.R.U.S. (Opera, 2003)
- Die Schnecke (Opera, 2004)

=== Dance theatre and ballet ===
- Avec ma main brulée (Performance, 1997)
- Flüchtige Begegnungen (Dance Theatre, 1997)
- Gegenwart, ich brauche Gegenwart (Dance Theatre, 1997)
- Ein Besuch im Bergwerk (Dance Theatre, 1999)
- The Trap (Bühnenmusik, 1999)
- Millennium Shuffle (Dance Theatre, 1999)
- Im Sandkasten (Dance Theatre, 2000)
- Auf der Suche nach dem KlaNNg (Hörspiel, 2001)

=== Chamber music ===
- Kleine Fluchten (1. String Quartet, 1993)
- Hämmerklavier (for Piano solo, 1994)
- Außer Atem (für 4 Blockflöten und einen Spieller, 1995)
- Bad Attitude (for Cello and Piano, 1995)
- Et in Arcadia Ego (2. String Quartet, 1997)
- Tableau (Bewegung für einen Klarinettisten und Pianisten, 1997)
- Melodie 1.0 (für Violine, Cello und Schreibmaschine, 1998)
- Nemesis (for Drumset solo, 1998)
- Croatoan II (für Streichquartett und Schlagzeug, 1999)
- Fast Forward (for Cello and Piano, 1999)
- Continuum (for Cello and Piano, 2000)
- Vermillion Sands (für Gitarre, 2000)
- Narziss (für Sopranblockflöte und Schlagzeug, 2001)
- La Risposta (für Cello and Keyboard, 2002)
- pong (for Septet, 2002)
- Riff (für zwei E-Gitarren mit Effektgeräten, 2002)
- Symphonie 2.0 (für 4 Kazoos mit beliebigen Instrumenten, 2002)
- Ostinato (für Orgel solo, 2003)
- Processional: Fanfaren/Signale (for Trumpet solo, 2003)

=== Orchestral work ===
- Die 12 Schläge der Sonnenuhr (für Kammerorchester, 1986)
- Vexations (für Kammerorchester, 1993)
- Adagio (für 32 Streicher, 1996)
- Symphonie 1.0 (für 12 Schreibmaschinen, 1997)
- Number Nine I-III (for Orchestra, 1998)
- Goldberg spielt (for Keyboard and Ensemble, 2000)
- Internet-Symphonie (for Orchestra, 2000)

=== Vocal music ===
- Hibernalische Gesänge (for Vocal Quartet, 1997)
- Büchner-Porträt (für Bariton und Klavier, 1997)
- Krausseriana (für Bariton und Klavier, 1999)
- Neue Dichter Lieben (Liederzyklus, 2000)
- ausklang (für Bariton und Klavier, 2001)
- Die Kriegsirre (für Mezzosopran und Klavier, 2001)
- wide unclasp (Liederzyklus für Frauenstimme und Jazz-Ensemble, 2002)
- Paradies Berlin (Liederzyklus, 2002–03)
- Ein Dichter stirbt (für Tenorbariton und Klavier, 2004)
