= Christoph Poppen =

German conductor, violinist and academic teacher

- Born: 9 March 1956 (age 69); Münster
- Education: Robert Schumann Hochschule
- Occupation: Conductor
- Organizations: Münchener Kammerorchester; Deutsche Radio Philharmonie Saarbrücken Kaiserslautern; ARD International Music Competition; Hochschule für Musik Detmold; Hochschule für Musik "Hanns Eisler"; Hochschule für Musik und Theater München; Hong Kong Sinfonietta
- Awards: Prize of the Christoph and Stephan Kaske Foundation; Kunstpreis des Saarlandes

Christoph Poppen (born 9 March 1956) is a German conductor, violinist and academic teacher.

== Career ==
Poppen was born in Münster. As a violinist, he was awarded first prize in the Kocian Violin Competition age 14. He studied the violin with Kurt Schäffer at the Robert Schumann Hochschule, later with Oscar Shumsky, Nathan Milstein, and Joseph Gingold.

In 1978, Poppen founded the Cherubini Quartet, winning in 1981 at the international string quartet competition in Evian. He was the conductor of the chamber orchestra Detmolder Kammerorchester from 1989 to 1995. He then succeeded Hans Stadlmair as the conductor and artistic director of the Münchener Kammerorchester. In collaboration with ECM he recorded with the orchestra contemporary music of composers such as Karl Amadeus Hartmann, Tigran Mansurian, Anton Webern, Sofia Gubaidulina, Giacinto Scelsi, Valentin Silvestrov and Barry Guy. As a violinist, he recorded in 2000 works of Johann Sebastian Bach with the Hilliard Ensemble. The title Morimur (We shall die) stands for a juxtaposition of Bach's Partita for Violin No. 2, which is related to Easter according to scholar Helga Thoene, and interspersed chorales, some from his cantatas and Passions. The Partita's final Ciaconna is performed twice, once with the chorale which Bach may have had in mind, along with the violin music. The recording was described as

... one of those increasingly rare things – a moving and intelligently programmed disc that is effective from beginning to end.

From 2006 Poppen has been the conductor of the Rundfunk-Sinfonieorchester Saarbrücken, which was, together with the Rundfunkorchester Kaiserslautern, named Deutsche Radio Philharmonie Saarbrücken Kaiserslautern in 2007. In 2007 he conducted in the Herkulessaal the premiere of Wilhelm Killmayer's Dithyramben for orchestra with the Symphonieorchester des Bayerischen Rundfunks.

Poppen was the artistic director of the ARD International Music Competition from 2000 to 2005. He was also Hong Kong Sinfonietta's Principal Guest Conductor starting from 2015. and will be their music director starting from April 2023 (succeeding Yip Wing-sie).

In 2014, Christoph Poppen founded the Festival International de Música de Marvão. This Portuguese village, situated at the border with Spain, has only 97 inhabitants. During the 10-day festival with 31 concerts, the village welcomes some 10,000 guests.

== Teaching ==
In 1988, Poppen was appointed professor of violin and chamber music at the Hochschule für Musik Detmold. He taught at the Hochschule für Musik "Hanns Eisler" in Berlin from 1995 and was its director from 1996 to 2000. He has been professor for violin and chamber music at the Hochschule für Musik und Theater München since 2003.

In 2012–13, Poppen taught at the DO School in Hamburg as part of a Fellowship program for young social entrepreneurs. He worked with the Fellows to produce a multicultural concert involving local youth groups; currently, he remains involved with the program in role of an advisor.

== Awards ==
- 2002 Prize of the Christoph and Stephan Kaske Foundation, with the Münchener Kammerorchester
- 2010 Kunstpreis des Saarlandes
