= Robert Dekeyser =

Belgian-German entrepreneur and former footballer

Robert "Bobby" Dekeyser
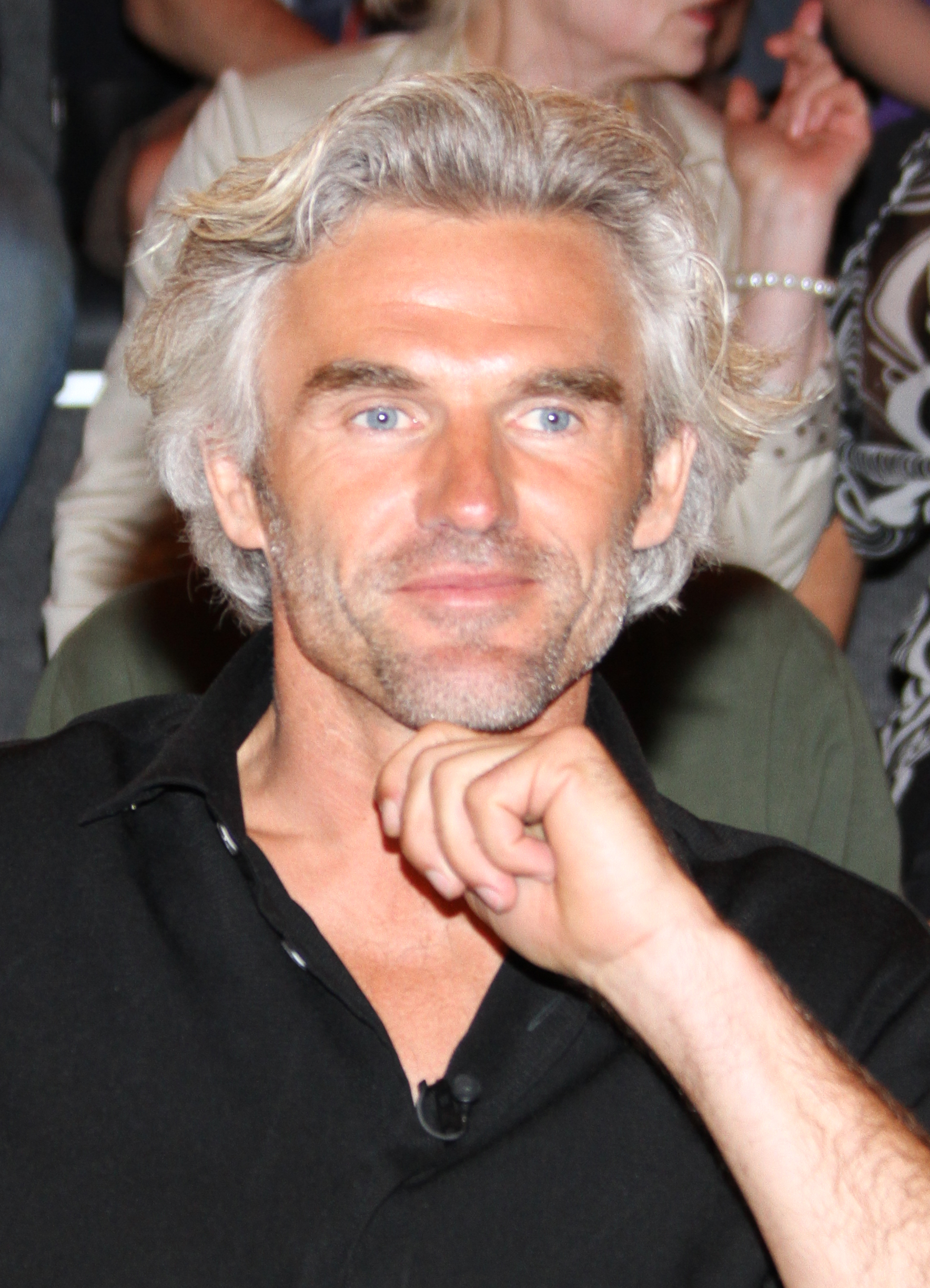
- Dekeyser on Markus Lanz (ZDF), 2012
- Born: Robert Dekeyser; 7 October 1964 (age 62); Leuven, Belgium
- Occupations: Entrepreneur (founder of DEDON; former professional footballer
- Years active: 1980–1991 (footballer), 1990–present (entrepreneur)
- Height: 1.86 m (6 ft 1 in)
- Spouse: Ann-Kathrin Dekeyser (m. 1990; died 2010)
- Children: 3
Association football career
- Position: Goalkeeper
Youth career
- Oud-Heverlee Leuven
- –1980: Wormatia Worms
- 1980–1982: 1. FC Kaiserslautern
Senior career*
Years	Team	Apps	(Gls)
1984–1986	Union Saint-Gilloise		(0)
1986–1987	Bayern Munich	0	(0)
1987–1988	1. FC Nürnberg	0	(0)
1988–1989	KRC Genk	2	(0)
1989–1992	1860 Munich	19	(0)
- * Club domestic league appearances and goals

Robert Dekeyser (born 7 October 1964) is a Belgian-German entrepreneur and former footballer who played as a goalkeeper. He is the founder of DEDON, a German manufacturer of outdoor furniture with distribution in more than 80 countries. An outdoor enthusiast, Dekeyser is also the founder of DEDON ISLAND, a luxury resort in the Philippines.

== Early life ==
Dekeyser was born in Leuven, Belgium, the eldest son of entrepreneurs who divorced when he was young. Raised in Belgium, Austria and Germany, he recalls his childhood as "chaotic", leaving him with a deep-seated longing for harmony. A self-described rebel and school truant, he turned to football as a source of discipline and self-esteem. At 14, he won a talent contest, earning himself a place at the New York football camp of his idol, the Brazilian striker Pelé, whom he credits with encouraging him to "follow your dreams". At the age of 15, having attended nine different schools, Dekeyser stood up in English class and announced that he was dropping out to become a professional footballer.

== Football career ==
In 1980, at the age of 16, Dekeyser joined the Junior A-League team 1. FC Kaiserslautern as goalkeeper, staying with them until 1982, when he was called up for military service in Belgium. On his release, in 1984, he joined Royal Union Saint-Gilloise in Belgium's second division. In 1986, on the recommendation of the FC Bayern Munich goalkeeper Jean-Marie Pfaff, Dekeyser was brought in as a replacement for the team's reserve keeper, who was sidelined with a long-term injury. A year later he was transferred to another Bundesliga team, 1. FC Nürnberg, where he continued to serve as reserve goalkeeper.

After a season at Belgium's first-division KRC Genk, Dekeyser transferred in 1989 to TSV 1860 München, where he served as starting goalkeeper. In his sixteenth appearance for the team, he was seriously injured by an elbow blow to the face and spent several weeks in hospital. While in hospital, he learned from the newspapers that he had been replaced as goalkeeper. Despite his anger at the manner of his dismissal, Dekeyser was persuaded to make a three-game comeback for 1860 Munich when the replacement goalkeeper himself was injured. He describes these as the "best three games of my career". Although numerous offers from first and second division teams followed, he retired from professional football at the end of the 1990–1991 season.

== Business career ==
Dekeyser founded his first company, DEDON, while recovering from a facial injury in hospital. He readily admits that he had no business plan or clear idea of what DEDON would do or sell. His motivation was "to have fun working with family and friends", which he has since described as a motto of the company. DEDON's first products were hand-painted skis, 80 pairs of which were sold, 50 of them later returned. It was only after a stint selling raffia giraffes imported from Madagascar that the company changed its focus to outdoor furniture.

In the late 1980s Dekeyser first began to develop his idea of an "outdoor living room", furnished with the attention to comfort, quality and aesthetics usually reserved for indoor living rooms. Following his retirement from professional football, he worked closely with his uncle, an engineer and expert at plastics extrusion, to create a durable, weather-resistant synthetic fiber (known today as DEDON Fiber) with a natural look and feel. Unsure of how to take his idea of the "outdoor living room" further, however, he put it on hold.

Then during a visit to the Cologne furniture fair in 1991, Dekeyser met a furniture manufacturer from Cebu, a Philippine island known for the craftsmanship of its weavers. The manufacturer agreed to help him produce woven rattan furniture using DEDON Fiber. Soon thereafter Dekeyser moved his family to Cebu where he spent six months developing DEDON's first woven products. Upon returning to Germany he and his wife, Ann-Kathrin, purchased an old farm on Lüneburg Heath, close to Hamburg Harbor, where DEDON furniture would then be shipped from the Philippines.

In its first decade the company, which consisted of a small group of family and friends sharing business duties and chores on the farm, grew slowly. A converted chicken coop served as Dekeyser's office. Furniture deliveries were stored in the barn. In 2000 DEDON opened its own production facility on Cebu so as to better control the design and quality of its furniture. This, along with the adoption of powder-coated aluminum frames, the introduction of more contemporary designs, and the development of innovative marketing campaigns, helped DEDON to grow rapidly. Over the next five years, sales increased by more than 1,300 percent. Within eight years, the Cebu staff expanded from seven to 3,600 employees.

In 2004 Dekeyser moved the company headquarters to the outskirts of Lüneburg. The headquarters, which included a facility for the production of DEDON Fiber, received media attention in Germany for their relaxed, family-like atmosphere and the many perks employees enjoyed, including billiards, yoga, sauna, gym and a chef. Berlin's Der Tagesspiegel daily newspaper dubbed Dekeyser's emphasis on employee satisfaction, both in Germany and the Philippines, "The Bobby Principle".

In 2006 Dekeyser sold a 49 percent stake in DEDON to a US-based private equity firm but soon regretted the sale. The "friendly atmosphere" of the company was being replaced by a focus on "money and numbers," he later explained. With the financial help of investor Daniel Borer, a Swiss physician, who assumed a minority interest in DEDON in 2009, Dekeyser was able to pay back the bank loans the private equity company had left behind.

After the buyback, Dekeyser took steps to restore DEDON's atmosphere and values. He also sought to revitalize the brand's communication, releasing photography campaigns, short films and a limited-edition book all shot by American fashion photographer Bruce Weber, whom Dekeyser has described as "very much on our wavelength". Other communications initiatives included the launch of the DEDON Tour du Monde catalog shoot, described as an ongoing, around-the-world journey to discover "unique places and moments under the open skies". By spring 2012 the Tour du Monde included stops in Kenya, India, Thailand, Mexico, South Africa, the Seychelles, New York City, Megève in France and the Philippine island of Siargao.

Dekeyser established relationships with several new designers after the buyback, most notably with Philippe Starck, who launched Play, his first collection for DEDON, at the 2010 Milan Furniture Fair. In a promotional video made at the time, Starck is quoted as saying "Everybody loves Bobby". Other designers associated with Dekeyser include Jean-Marie Massaud and Stephen Burks, the latter of whom appeared in a video with Dekeyser to promote the launch of his Dala collection for DEDON at the 2012 Milan Furniture Fair.

In 2010, less than a year after Dekeyser's return, DEDON opened a wholly owned US subsidiary, DEDON USA, followed by the launch of DEDON's first US showroom, located in the SoHo neighborhood of Manhattan. A Los Angeles showroom was opened in early 2012. Due to DEDON's growing activities in the US, Dekeyser spent an increasing amount of time in New York City.

In the spring of 2012 the company opened DEDON ISLAND, a luxury resort with a "barefoot state of mind" on the Philippine island of Siargao.

After stepping back from operations in 2014, Dekeyser sold his remaining stake in DEDON in December 2016.

== Philanthropy ==
In 2009 Dekeyser co-founded the Dekeyser&Friends Foundation, which is based in Geneva and with a stated purpose "to inspire young people to follow their dreams and bring about change in the world". Since its inception, the foundation has brought young people aged 18 to 28 together for encounters with mentors, or 'friends', such as German Olympic double gold medalist skier Markus Wasmeier and Turkish traditional dance troupe leader Mustafa Erdoğan.

One initiative of the foundation was the Hamburg-based D&F Academy, described as a "platform where knowledgeable and inspiring personalities can pass on their experience to young people from around the world in hands-on learning projects". The academy's inaugural program was led by British anthropologist and environmentalist Jane Goodall, its second program by the former Germany national team and Arsenal goalkeeper Jens Lehmann.

One of the foundation's longest-running and most comprehensive projects is the Compostela Village Project, which began in 2009 on Cebu. This rehousing project has provided a new home to around 500 people (primarily families) who until then had been living on a dumpsite on Cebu. So that they can build thriving and independent lives, the residents learn skills such as farming, animal husbandry, weaving, jewellery-making, and sewing.

== Personal life ==
While on a business trip to the Philippines in 2010, Dekeyser received the news that Ann-Kathrin, his wife of more than 20 years, was in a coma back in Germany. She died before he could make it home. The story serves as the prologue of Unverkäuflich ('Not For Sale'), Dekeyser's autobiography, published by Ankerherz Verlag in May 2012. Dekeyser credits family and old friends with helping him recover after an eight-month period he describes as a "hole that could not be deeper or blacker". They have three children. One of them is rapper Estikay.
