= Wilhelm Killmayer =

German composer and academic

- Wilhelm Killmayer, in the 1980s
- Born: 21 August 1927; Munich, Germany
- Died: 20 August 2017 (aged 89); Starnberg, Germany
- Education: Ludwig-Maximilians-Universität München; Staatliche Musikhochschule
- Occupation: Composer
- Organization: Hochschule für Musik und Theater München
- Awards: Villa Massimo; Bayerische Akademie der Schönen Künste; Hindemith Prize; Kaske Foundation Prize

Wilhelm Killmayer (21 August 1927 – 20 August 2017) was a German composer of classical music, a conductor and an academic teacher of composition at the Hochschule für Musik und Theater München from 1973 to 1992. He composed symphonies and song cycles on poems by Friedrich Hölderlin, Joseph von Eichendorff, Georg Trakl and Peter Härtling, among others.

== Early life ==
Wilhelm Killmayer was born on 21 August 1927 in Munich, Germany. He studied conducting and composition from 1945 to 1951 in Munich at Hermann Wolfgang von Waltershausen’s Musikseminar. At the same time, he was enrolled at the Ludwig-Maximilians-Universität München where he studied musicology with Rudolf von Ficker and Walter Riezler, and German studies. He was a private student of Carl Orff from 1951 and was admitted to his master class at the Staatliche Musikhochschule in 1953. He was a scholar at the Villa Massimo twice, in 1958 and 1965/66.

== Career ==
Killmayer was a teacher of music theory and counterpoint at the Trappsches Konservatorium in Munich from 1955. He was a conductor of the Bavarian State Opera's ballet from 1961 to 1964. From 1973 to 1992 he was a professor of composition at the Hochschule für Musik. Among his students were Ali N. Askin, Max Beckschäfer, Sandeep Bhagwati, Moritz Eggert, Lutz Landwehr von Pragenau, Fredrik Schwenk, Rudi Spring and Laurence Traiger.

Killmayer's first composition receiving attention was Lorca-Romanzen after Federico García Lorca, premiered at the Donaueschingen Festival. In 1954 he composed a Missa brevis, which was recorded and reviewed:

Young (29) Munich-born Composer Wilhelm Killmayer's Missa Brevis ripples with exciting, shifting rhythms and rises skillfully to a colorful series of blasting choral climaxes occasionally more reminiscent of the bandstand than the choir.

Killmayer composed three symphonies called Fogli (1968), Ricordanze (1968/69) and Menschen-Los (1972/73, revised 1988). He composed other orchestral works such as Nachtgedanken (1973), and music for chamber orchestra, The woods so wilde (1970), Schumann in Endenich (1972) and Kindertage (1973). His stage works La Buffonata (1959/60) and Yolimba (new version 1970) are based on texts by Tankred Dorst. For the 20th anniversary of the Münchener Kammerorchester Killmayer composed in 1970 Fin al punto for string orchestra, which premiered in 1971, conducted by Hans Stadlmair. He wrote about this work:

The calm already contains the catastrophe. Out of the calm grows the movement that drives itself to the furthest extreme of its powers, where it collapses. It is the point at which one gives up, beyond which one can escape into the open.

Interested in poetry and the voice, he composed Lieder, three cycles of Hölderlin-Lieder based on poems by Friedrich Hölderlin (1980s), also song cycles based on Joseph von Eichendorff (1991), Georg Trakl (1993 and 1996) and Peter Härtling (1993), and ballads such as Heinrich Heine's Ali Bey (2006) and Eduard Mörike's Der Feuerreiter (2007). Killmayer composed more than 200 Lieder. Killmayer died in Starnberg.

== Awards ==
Killmayer received the Fromm Music Foundation Award in 1954 for his Missa brevis. He was a member of the Bayerische Akademie der Schönen Künste from 1972, and from 1980 a member of the Academy of Arts, Berlin. In 1990 he was the first recipient of the Hindemith Prize of the Schleswig-Holstein Musik Festival. Invited by Walter Fink, he was the fourth composer featured in the annual Komponistenporträt of the Rheingau Musik Festival in 1994. In 2003 he was awarded the Musikpreis der Landeshauptstadt München. In 2010 he received the Prize of the Christoph and Stephan Kaske Foundation.

== Works ==
Killmayer's works were published by Schott.

Stage works

- La Buffonata (1959/60), ballet opera, libretto: Tankred Dorst
- La Tragedia di Orfeo (1960/61), after Angelo Poliziano
- Yolimba oder Die Grenzen der Magie (1963, revised 1970), libretto: Tankred Dorst and Wilhelm Killmayer

Vocal

- Acht Shakespeare-Lieder (1955) for tenor and ensemble, premiered 26 May 1956, Franz Fehringer, members of the Sinfonie-Orchesters des Hessischen Rundfunks, Wilhelm Killmayer
- Geistliche Hymnen und Gesänge (1964) for six-part mixed choir (SAATTB) after Jean Racine
- Drei Gesänge nach Hölderlin (1965) for baritone and piano
- Tre Canti di Leopardi (1965)
- Antiphone (1967) for baritone, orchestra and small men's choir, recorded 1985, Bayerischer Rundfunk
- Tamquam sponsus (1974) for soprano and instruments. Text: from Psalm XXIII
- Französisches Liederbuch (1979/80) for soprano, baritone and chamber ensemble, premiered 3 May 1980, Schwetzingen Festival, June Card, Philippe Huttenlocher, Südwestdeutsches Kammerorchester, Paul Angerer
- Hölderlin-Lieder after his latest poems, for tenor and orchestra, first cycle (1982–1985) premiered 3 February 1986, Peter Schreier, Bayerisches Staatsorchester, Wolfgang Sawallisch, second cycle (1983–1987) premiered 14 August 1987, Salzburg Festival, Peter Schreier, ORF-Sinfonieorchester, Lothar Zagrosek

Orchestra

- Konzert (1955) for piano and orchestra, premiered 21 April 1956 München, Günter Louegk (piano), Münchner Philharmoniker, Fritz Rieger)
- Divertissement (1957) for orchestra, premiered October 1957, Radio-Sinfonieorchester Stuttgart, Carl Bamberger
- Sinfonia I: Fogli (First Symphony, 1968)
- Sinfonia II: Ricordanze (Second Symphony, 1968/69)
- Fin al punto (1970) for string orchestra, premiered 14 January 1971, Münchener Kammerorchester, Hans Stadlmair
- Symphonie III: Menschen-Los (Third Symphony, 1972/73, revised 1988)
- Nachtgedanken (1973) for orchestra, 7 August 1973, Salzburg Festival, Mozarteum Orchestra Salzburg, Leopold Hager
- Jugendzeit (1977), Poème symphonique, premiered 16 January 1978, Philharmonisches Orchester Freiburg, Klauspeter Seibel
- Überstehen und Hoffen (1977/78), Poème symphonique, premiered 6 May 1978, Münchner Philharmoniker, Lothar Zagrosek
- Poème symphoniques (1977–1980), Verschüttete Zeichen (1977/78), Essay symphonique, Im Freien (1980), Poème symphonique, all premiered 20 March 1981, Symphonieorchester des Bayerischen Rundfunks, Hiroshi Wakasugi
- Orchester-Melodien (2004), premiered 26 June 2004 in Berlin, Deutsches Symphonie-Orchester Berlin, Kent Nagano
- Dithyramben (2006) for orchestra, premiered 12 January 2007 in the Herkulessaal, Symphonieorchester des Bayerischen Rundfunks, Christoph Poppen

Chamber music

- Kammermusik (1957) for jazz instruments (1957)
- Führe mich, Alter, nur immer in deinen geschnörkelten Frühlings-Garten! Noch duftet und taut frisch und gewürzig sein Flor (1974) for chamber ensemble, premiered in May 1975 in Nürnberg
- 8 Bagatelles (1990/91) for cello and piano

== Recordings ==
- Missa brevis, Fromm Music Foundation, Twentieth Century Composers Series, together with Lou Harrison: Mass, New York Concert Choir and Orchestra, Margaret Hillis, Epic Records CBS 1957
- fin al punto / Poèmes symphoniques, Fin al punto for string orchestra: Münchener Kammerorchester, Hans Stadlmair, Jugendzeit, Verschüttete Zeichen, Überstehen und Hoffen: Symphonieorchester des Bayerischen Rundfunks, Hiroshi Wakasugi
- Wilhelm Killmayer: Chamber Music, CPO 1989

A reviewer for Gramophone noted: "Killmayer can swing from meditation to frantic action within the frame of the most basic harmonic progression, and because his music is so convincingly natural in atmosphere, techniques and materials which in other hands might seem crude and predictable serve their purpose well."

- Wilhelm Killmayer: Sinfonien 1–3; La Joie de Vivre; Nachtgedanken, WERGO 2000
