= Enno Hagenah =

German politician (born 1957)

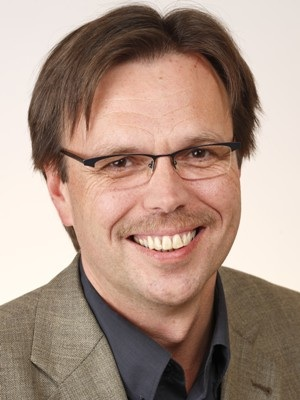
Enno Hagenah

Enno Hagenah (born 31 October 1957, Engelschoff) is a German politician for the Alliance 90/The Greens.

He was elected to the Lower Saxon Landtag in 1998, and was re-elected on two occasions in 2003 and 2008, leaving the Landtag in 2013.
