= Brigitte Fassbaender =

German mezzo-soprano

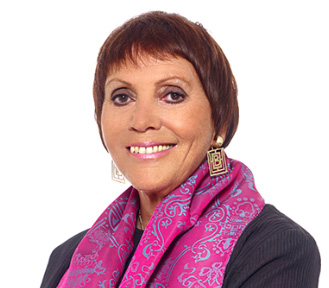
- Fassbaender in 2013
- Born: 3 July 1939 (age 87); Berlin, Germany
- Occupations: Operatic mezzo-soprano; Stage director; Intendant
- Organizations: Bavarian State Opera; Staatstheater Braunschweig; Tyrolean State Theatre
- Title: Kammersängerin
- Parents: Sabine Peters; Willi Domgraf-Fassbaender
- Awards: Légion d'honneur

Brigitte Fassbaender (German: [bʁiˈɡɪtə ˈfasbɛndɐ]; born 3 July 1939), is a German mezzo-soprano opera singer and a stage director. From 1999 to 2012 she was intendant (managing director) of the Tyrolean State Theatre in Innsbruck, Austria. She holds the title Kammersängerin from the Bavarian State Opera in Munich and the Vienna Staatsoper.

== Career ==
Fassbaender was born in Berlin, the daughter of screen actress Sabine Peters and baritone Willi Domgraf-Fassbaender. The family settled in Nuremberg after World War II. She spent her early career in Munich.

Fassbaender studied singing with her father, at the Nuremberg Conservatory. She joined the Bavarian State Opera in 1961, where her first leading role was Nicklausse in The Tales of Hoffmann. Fassbaender appeared as Octavian, the title role of Der Rosenkavalier by Richard Strauss, in Munich in 1967, the role that launched her international career. In 1971, she performed at Royal Opera, London and made her Metropolitan Opera debut in 1974. Fassbaender's first love was not music, but theatre. "I was obsessed by the theatre and wanted to be an actress like my mother."

In addition to her operatic work, Fassbaender has performed in the concert hall as a Lieder singer and in films, singing the role of Prince Orlofsky in the 1984 film production of Die Fledermaus by Johann Strauss. Her recordings range from operas, vocal works with orchestra, to Lieder, including Schubert's Winterreise and Schwanengesang, oratorios such as Bach's Christmas Oratorio and Handel's Messiah, and also speaking roles after her retirement from singing. She has appeared in numerous televised opera productions now available on DVD, such as her signature roles Octavian and Orlofsky, both conducted by her frequent collaborator Carlos Kleiber.

Fassbaender has also taught masterclasses. In 2010, she wrote the book and texts for two successful musicals - Lulu - das Musical and Shylock!, based on Shakespeare's Merchant of Venice. Both were a collaboration with the composer Stephan Kanyar and written for the Tiroler Landestheater in Innsbruck. In recent years, Fassbaender has worked in arts administration. She was the Opera director at the Staatstheater Braunschweig for two years from 1995 to 1997. In 1999, she became intendant (managing director) of the Tiroler Landestheater (Tyrolean State Theatre) in Innsbruck, a position she held until 2012. More recently, she has been director of the annual Richard Strauss Festival in Garmisch-Partenkirchen.

In 2006, she was awarded the Musikpreis der Landeshauptstadt München. In January 2011, the French Government appointed her an honorary Chevalier of the Légion d'honneur. In 2026, she was awarded Der Faust for lifetime achievement.
