= Hans Stadlmair =

Austrian conductor and composer (1929–2019)

- Hans Stadlmair, c. 1990
- Born: 3 May 1929; Neuhofen an der Krems, Austria
- Died: 13 February 2019 (aged 89); Munich, Germany
- Education: Vienna Academy of Music
- Occupations: Conductor; Composer
- Organization: Münchener Kammerorchester
- Awards: Order of Merit of the Federal Republic of Germany; Musikpreis der Landeshauptstadt München

Hans Stadlmair (3 May 1929 – 13 February 2019) was an Austrian conductor and composer. He conducted the Münchener Kammerorchester for almost four decades. He conducted more than 6000 concerts, many in collaboration with the Bayerischer Rundfunk, including premieres. His compositions include works of all genres except opera. His Miró, an Entrada for orchestra, premiered at the Gasteig in Munich in 2011, with Christian Thielemann conducting the Münchner Philharmoniker.

== Career ==
Born in Neuhofen an der Krems, Hans Stadlmair studied from 1946 to 1952 at the Vienna Academy of Music with Clemens Krauss and Alfred Uhl, and from 1952 to 1956 in Stuttgart with Johann Nepomuk David. From 1956 to 1995 he was artistic director of the Münchener Kammerorchester (MKO) and conducted several premieres. He conducted more than 6000 concerts, as well as on international tours and in collaboration with the Bayerischer Rundfunk. In 1971 Stadlmair conducted the premiere of Wilhelm Killmayer's Fin al punto, composed for the 20th anniversary of the Münchener Kammerorchester. In 1981 he premiered Ulrich Stranz's Contrasubjekte, a Passacaglia on B-A-C-H for fourteen strings. In 1986 he collaborated with trumpeter Maurice André to record Joseph Haydn's Trumpet Concerto and Michael Haydn's Trumpet Concerto in D major. In 1981 he conducted the four flute concertos by Franz Danzi with soloist András Adorján. In 1995 and 1998 he recorded works by Leopold Mozart, with a "brightly refreshing and refined orchestral sound". His recording of Frank Martin's Polyptique for violin and strings (inspired by a series of small paintings of the Passion in Siena), Etudes for String Orchestra, and Sonata da Chiesa for viola and string orchestra, was favorably reviewed:

Conductor Hans Stadlmair brings out every lyric moment while keeping a taut rein on intricate rhythms.

Stadlmair was a guest conductor at the Salzburg Festival from 1976. He recorded all eleven symphonies of Joachim Raff with the Bamberger Symphoniker, along with Raff's four orchestral suites, overtures and smaller orchestral works. He conducted his own completion of the Adagio from Mahler's unfinished Symphony No. 10. Stadelmair made more than 500 recordings for the broadcaster Bayerischer Rundfunk. In a celebration of Stadlmair's 80th birthday, the MKO, conducted by Alexander Liebreich, played this work along with Stadlmair's Adagietto Ecce homo, Magnus Lindberg's violin concerto, Arnold Schoenberg's Notturno and Thomas Larcher's L'homme au chapeau mou. In 2011 Christian Thielemann conducted the Münchner Philharmoniker at the Gasteig in the premiere of Stadlmair's Miró, an Entrada for Orchestra, composed in 2006, inspired by sculptures of Joan Miró.

Stadlmair died on 13 February 2019, aged 89 at his home in Munich.

== Works ==
Stadlmair composed more than 100 works, but destroyed about half of them. He wrote works of all genres except opera. His compositions are held by the German National Library, including:

- Violin Concerto (1961), Schirmer
- Toccata for strings and harpsichord (1966)
- Trumpet Concerto with strings (1967)
- Sinfonia serena for strings (1970)
- Drei Fantasien (3 Fantasies) for viola solo (1973), Henry Litolff's Verlag, Edition Peters
- Orpheus-Legende for viola and fortepiano (1993)
- Sonata for viola solo (1960); Breitkopf & Härtel
- Sonata da Chiesa for viola and organ (1981)
- Monodie in memoriam John Coltrane "Love Supreme" for saxophon solo (1991), Thiason
- Saxofonia Introduktion und Passacaglia für Saxophonorchester und Schlagzeug, Thiason
- Miró Entrada für Orchester (2006)

== Awards ==
- 1989 Bundesverdienstkreuz am Bande
- 1994 Musikpreis der Landeshauptstadt München
