= Nikolaus Brass =

German composer

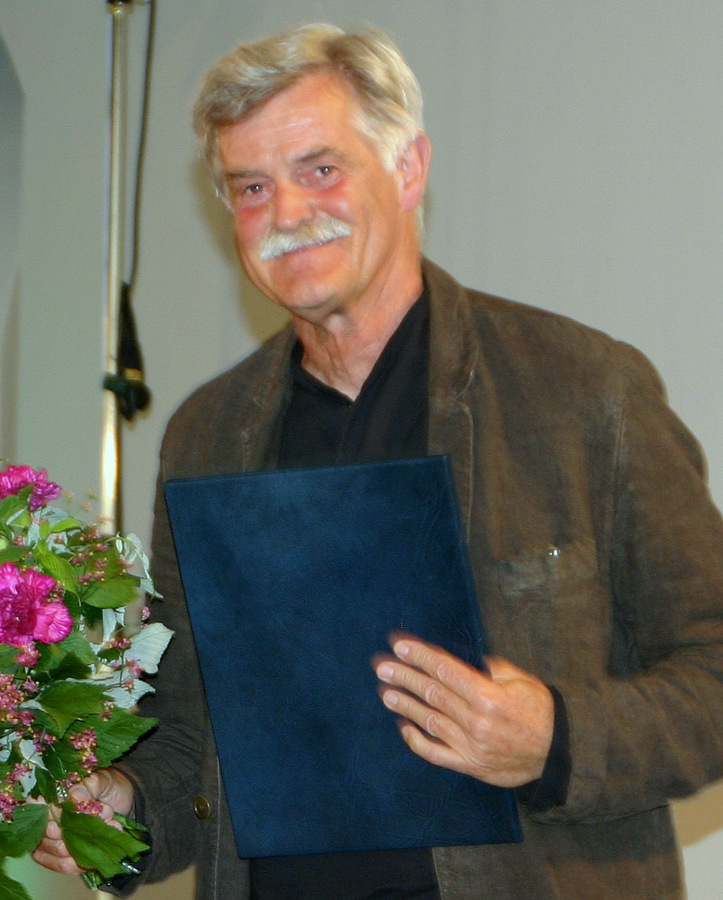
Nikolaus Brass, 2009 (after receiving the Musikpreis der Landeshauptstadt München)

Nikolaus Brass (born 25 October 1949) is a German composer.

== Life and career ==
Born in Lindau (Bodensee), Brass began composing early. After graduating from high school in 1968, he studied medicine in Munich, Scotland and at the Freie Universität Berlin. He studied composition with Peter Kiesewetter in Munich, with Frank Michael Beyer at the Universität der Künste Berlin and with Helmut Lachenmann in Hanover. In 1980–86, he participated in the Darmstädter Ferienkurse. There, he met Morton Feldman, who had a lasting influence on his further musical thinking and work.

For many years, Brass worked as a medical doctor – first as a hospital doctor, from 1982 as editor of the journal Ärztliche Praxis – and at the same time as a composer. The "concrete confrontation with the existential fragility of human existence, with departure and happiness, but also pain, infirmity and death, acted like a compass in the search for expression".

Characteristic for his music were "flowing time processes, questions of order and disturbance, the [...] scanning of the outer acoustic surface for what it contains as echoes as well as aspects of human existence" in a "permanent circle of losing and finding again."

Since 1981 Brass' works have been regularly performed at festivals. In 2008 his work was the focus of the International Weingartener Days for New Music.

His compositions Void (for piano) and Void II (for solos and orchestra) – so named after the Voids, the "leeren Stellen" in the Jewish Museum Berlin that remind us of the loss of life, culture, and memory through the Schoa – were juxtaposed at the 2009 Klangwerktage in Hamburg with a joint composition by young people who had dealt with the same topic. In an accompanying panel discussion, the architect of the Jewish Museum, Daniel Libeskind, and Brass discussed forms of remembrance in architecture and music.

== Honours ==
- 1981 Preis beim Jürgen Ponto-Kompositionswettbewerb (für das Streichtrio Morgenlob)
- 1999 Musikförderpreis der Landeshauptstadt Munich
- 2009 Musikpreis der Landeshauptstadt München (Laudatio: Reinhard Schulz; read by Jürgen Jung, Bayerischer Rundfunk)

== CD releases ==
- Chamber Music, vol. 1: Void / A Due / Trio. Col Legno (2005)
- String Quartets, vol.2: Nr. 1–3. Auritus Quartet. Col Legno (2006)
- Orchestral Works, vol.1: Structures of Echo – Lindauer Beweinung / Void II. Neos Music (2007)
- Songlines. Neos Music (2010)
- Trio. Auf: "Struktur und Oberfläche". elole-Klaviertrio. Beoton (2010)
