= The DO School =

Educational institution in Berlin, Germany

- Founded: 2014
- Founder: Florian Hoffmann, Katherin Kirschenmann
- Headquarters: Berlin, Germany
- Number of locations: 4
- Website: thedoschool.com

The DO School is a global organization founded in 2014 with offices in Berlin, New York, Hong Kong, and Hamburg. The DO School supports businesses, entrepreneurs, and "young talents".

The DO School has run programs in 27 countries for over 50,000 participants. Since its inception, The DO School has created new products and services across multiple industries. Partners include BMW, H&M, Unilever, Covestro, Osram, Google, Hong Kong Jockey Club, United Nations, and the government of New York City.

== History ==
The DO School grew out of the D&F Academy and was founded in 2014 by social entrepreneurs Katherin Kirschenmann and Florian Hoffmann in Hamburg, Germany; it also immediately began operating in New York City. Consequently, The DO School was named a Disruptive Innovation Fellow in 2015 by the Disruptor Foundation, which was founded by notable Harvard Professor Clayton M. Christensen and Tribeca Founder Craig Hatkoff. The DO School moved its headquarters to Berlin.

== Areas of Expertise ==
The DO School offers different training programs for emerging social entrepreneurs, well-established organizations, young leaders, and intrapreneurs. It specializes in three areas: Co-creative Innovation, Individual and Organizational Development, and Impact Entrepreneurship. The programs vary in length, focus, and outcomes.

== Awards and recognition ==
The DO School has received several awards and recognition since its inception in 2014. In 2014, The DO School was named among the best social innovation ventures by European Investment Bank Social Innovation Tournament. In 2015, it was awarded the New York City Venture Fellowship Award by Mayor Michael Bloomberg honoring approximately. 30 leading start-ups that deliver innovation for New York City. In 2016, it was awarded the Land der Ideen Award by the German Government Award for being one of the most innovative social purpose organisations in Germany by the German President Joachim Gauck. It was also awarded the Deutscher Engagement Preis in 2016.

== Partners ==
The DO School holds partnerships with a variety of organizations.

Amongst the DO School’s partners are Newman's Own Foundation, H&M Germany, IKEA, The City of New York, BVG, Deutsche Bahn, Hong Kong Jockey Club, United Nations Environment Program, Messe Berlin, Covestro, and the Westerwelle Foundation.
