= Kalypso Nicolaïdis =

Greek/French academic

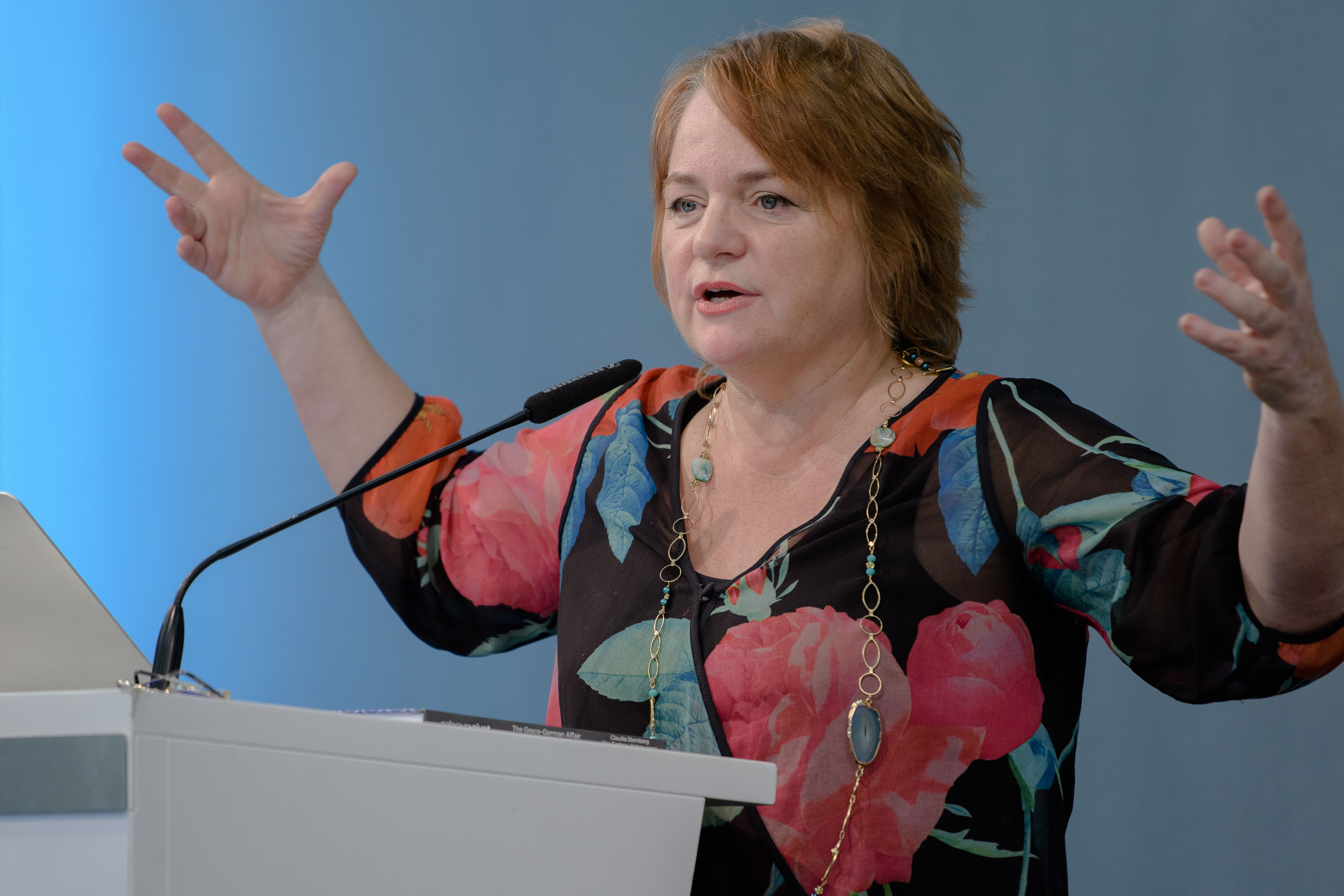
- Nicolaïdis in 2018
- Born: March 1962 (age 64); Paris, France
- Citizenship: British; French; Greek

Academic background
- Education: Sorbonne (DEUG); Sciences Po (Diplôme, DEA); Harvard University (MPA, PhD)
- Thesis: Mutual Recognition in EU Trade in Services

Academic work
- Discipline: Political science
- Sub-discipline: International relations
- Institutions: Harvard University; Sciences Po; College of Europe; New York University; European University Institute; University of Oxford
- Doctoral students: Kostas Bakoyannis
- Website: kalypsonicolaidis.com

Kalypso Aude Nicolaïdis (Greek: Καλυψώ Νικολαΐδη) is a Franco-Greek academic, currently Professor of International Relations and Director of the Center for International Studies at Oxford University, England. She teaches in the areas of European integration, international relations, international political economy, negotiation and game theory and research methods as University Lecturer in the Department of Politics and International Relations. In 2020, Nicolaïdis joined the School of Transnational Governance at the European University Institute as a full time professor.

== Publications ==
Her articles have appeared in Foreign Affairs, Foreign Policy, The Journal of Common Market Studies, Journal of European Public Policy, International Organization as well as in French in Politique Étrangère, Politique Européenne and Raison Critique. As an editor, her books include Echoes of Empire: Memory, Identity and Colonial Legacies (ed w/ Sebe and Maas, IB Tauris), Normative Power Europe Revisited (ed w/ Whitman, Journal Conflict and Cooperation) and European Stories: Intellectual Debates on Europe in National Context (ed w/ Lacroix, OUP, 2010).
