= Andre Asriel =

Austrian-German composer (1922–2019)

Andre Asriel (22 February 1922 – 28 May 2019) was an Austrian-German composer.

== Life ==
Born in Vienna, Asriel first attended the Akademisches Gymnasium and then the Bundesgymnasium IX (Gymnasium Wasagasse) in Vienna, where the later Oscar winner and composer Ernest Gold was his classmate. Here he pursued musical studies at the same time, studying piano with Grete Hinterhofer and theory with Richard Stöhr at the State Academy of Music in Vienna from 1936 to 1938. He was extraordinarily gifted and an outstanding pianist even at a young age.

After the Anschluss to Nazi Germany, his mother ensured that her 16-year-old son Andre was able to emigrate to England with a Kindertransport as a racially persecuted person at the end of 1938. She herself did not manage to escape. With the beginning of the war in September 1939, all ties to the old homeland and the family were severed. Music was Asriel's interest even in a foreign country, but he did not know how to start and finance a suitable course of study. Through an encounter with the later poet Erich Fried - also a former pupil of Wasagymnasium - he found contact with the exile organisation Freie Deutsche Jugend (FDJ), which also financed his studies. Asriel took over the leadership of the London FDJ choir and made friends among its members. As Licentiate of the Royal Academy of Music (L.R.A.M.), he continued his studies from 1941 with Franz Osborn (piano) and Ernst Hermann Meyer (composition).

His gratitude to the FDJ led Asriel to destroyed Germany in 1946 to help build socialism there. In 1946 he continued his music studies, which had been interrupted in exile, at the Hochschule für Musik in the western part of Berlin with Reinhard Schwarz-Schilling and Hermann Wunsch (composition) and Richard Rössler (piano). This was followed by the state examination in piano in 1948. From 1950 to 1951, Andre Asriel was a master student at the Deutsche Akademie der Künste (East Berlin) with Hanns Eisler. From 1950 to 1967, he was a lecturer and then professor of composition at the Hochschule für Musik "Hanns Eisler" (DDR). He retired in 1980.

Asriel became known above all for his political songs. But film music was also an important field of activity for him. He wrote the music for more than 30 films. Furthermore, he composed chansons, ballads, chamber, vocal and instrumental music. Many of his compositions were influenced by jazz music.

He was married to the Germanist Gertrud (Katja) Asriel from 1951 and had two children.

In 1951, Asriel was awarded the National Prize of the GDR, in 1970 the Kunstpreis des FDGB, and in 1974 and 1982 the Patriotic Order of Merit.

=== Chamber music (1964–1972) ===
- 20 Variationen über "Ich hab mein Feinsliebchen", for flute and guitar
- Shakespeare-Suite, for two trumpets and two trombones, 1993, Neue Musik
- Katzenwalzer, for violin and piano

=== Music for keyboard instruments (1962–1988) ===
- Sonate, for piano
- Fuge in C, for piano
- Toccata und Fuge, for organ

=== Music for concert guitar (1962-1988) ===
- Baroque in Blue, for solo guitar
- A Little Jazz Music, for guitar solo
- Prelude and Toccata, for 2 guitars
- Etudes and Recital Pieces, for solo guitar
- Four Pieces, for 2 guitars
- Suite in E, for 2 guitars
- Cinque pezzi obbligati, for solo guitar

=== Choral music (1951–1977) ===
- Mahle, Mühle mahle (Walter Dehmel), for mixed choir
- Suite in Scat, für gemischten Chor und Rhythmusgruppe
- Sechs Fabeln nach Aesop, for mixed choir
- Drei Chöre nach lateinischen Texten, for mixed choir
- Drei Kommentare zu "Moro lasso" by Carlo Gesualdo, for chamber choir and six instruments
- Drei ernste Gesänge (Bertolt Brecht), for male choir

=== Mass Lieder (1941–1983) ===
- Wir lieben das Leben (Erich Fried)
- Viel Blut ward hingegeben (Kurt Barthel)
- Freundschaft, Einheit, Frieden (Herbert Keller)
- Es lebe das Brot (KuBa)
- Tapfer lacht die junge Garde (Kurt Barthel)
- Roter Oktober (KuBa)
- Schlacht am Galgenberg (Manfred Bieler)
- Matrosen von Kiel (Bodo Krautz)
- Lied der Republik (Heinz Kahlau)
- Die rote Fahne (Helmut Kontauts)

=== Songs and Chansons (1948–1975) ===
- Lied vom St.Nimmerleinstag (Bertolt Brecht)
- Gegen den Krieg (KuBa)
- Ungarisches Largo (Jens Gerlach)
- Lied von der Eile (Heinz Kahlau)
- Atomraketenlied (Jens Gerlach)
- Lehmhaus-Blues (Jens Gerlach)
- Lied vom Glück (Bertolt Brecht)
- Limericks (Peter Hacks)
- Argumentation (Jens Gerlach)
- Dukatenlied (Jens Gerlach)
- Treue (Heinrich Heine)
- Abend in einer großen Stadt (Louis Fürnberg)
- Auf der Sonnenseite (Manfred Krug)
- Shimmy in grün (Peter Hacks)
- Auf dem Bergarbeiterball (Peter Hacks)
- Die Oliven gedeihen (Peter Hacks)
- Oktober (Alfred Kerr)
- Der September (Erich Kästner)
- Der Monarch (Peter Hacks)
- Das Osterhuhn (Heinz Kahlau)
- Mondlied (Peter Hacks)
- Lied von den Kranichen (Kurt Demmler)
- Karl I. (Heinrich Heine)
- So muss es sein (Volker Braun nach Béranger)

=== Piano Lieder (1940–1971) ===
- Childe Harold (Heinrich Heine)
- Drei Gesänge (Langston Hughes)
- Zwei Sprüche (Bertolt Brecht)
- Der Tod (Matthias Claudius)
- Halt an dein Boot (Wolfram Dietrich)
- Sechs Lieder (Bertolt Brecht)
- Acht Liebeslieder (Jens Gerlach)
- Schön Dorindgen (Peter Hacks)
- Narrenlied (William Shakespeare)
- Wer ist Sylvia (William Shakespeare)
- Baumlige Lieder (Helmut Stöhr)
- Numerous folk song arrangements, including

Jiddische Volkslieder – Kinder- und Wiegenlieder, Verlag Neue Musik, Berlin
Jiddische Volkslieder – Berufs- und Ständelieder, Verlag Neue Musik, Berlin
Jiddische Volkslieder – Liebeslieder, Verlag Neue Musik, Berlin

=== Film scores and theatre music (1955-1986) ===
==== Film scores ====
===== Feature films =====
- Der Lotterieschwede (1958), Joachim Kunert (after Martin Andersen Nexø)
- Ehesache Lorenz (1959), Joachim Kunert
- Wo der Zug nicht lange hält … (1960), Joachim Hasler
- Seilergasse 8 (1960), Joachim Kunert
- Die letzte Nacht (1961), Joachim Kunert (TV film)
- On the Sunny Side (1961), Ralf Kirsten
- Die unbekannte Größe (1961), Baumert (TV film)
- Der Schwur des Soldaten Pooley (1961), (TV film)
- Follow Me, Scoundrels (1962), Heinz Thiel
- Geheimarchiv an der Elbe (1962), Kurt Jung-Alsen
- Der Dieb von San Marengo (1963), Günter Reisch
- Mir nach, Canaillen! (1964), Ralf Kirsten
- Der verlorene Engel (1966/1971), Ralf Kirsten
- Frau Venus und ihr Teufel (1967), Ralf Kirsten
- Netzwerk (1970), Ralf Kirsten
- Zwei Briefe an Pospischiel (1970), Ralf Kirsten (TV film)
- Die Elixiere des Teufels (1973), Ralf Kirsten (after E. T. A. Hoffmann)
- Unterm Birnbaum (1973), Ralf Kirsten (after Theodor Fontane)
- Eine Pyramide für mich (1975), Ralf Kirsten

===== Short films =====
- Lebendes Eisen (1955), Berthold Beissert (Popular science film)
- Märkische Novelle (1957), Max Jaap (documentary)
- Das Faschingskostüm (1958), Kurt Weiler (animated film)
- Martin Andersen Nexö (1959), Joachim Kunert (documentary)
- Der Bankraub (1961), Hans Joachim Hildebrandt (magazin)
- Die Füchsin und der Biber (1961), Ralf Kirsten (magazin)
- Moderne Grafik (1961), (popular science film)
- Dorfkinder (1962), Heinz Müller (documentary)
- Pasaremos (1962), (popular science film)
- Hase und Igel (1963), Horst Seemann (magazin)
- Gleisbau (1963), (popular science film)
- Hüben und drüben (1964), Walter Heynowski (documentary)
- Geschlechter (1964), (popular science film)
- O.K. (1965), Walter Heynowski (documentary)
- Borinage (1983/84), Joris Ivens/Henri Storck documentary (1933, silent film, E.P.I., Club de l’Ecran, Brüssel)
- Drifters (1984/86), John Grierson documentary (1929, silent film, E.M.B.Film Unit, GB)

==== Theater music ====
- 1949: Friedrich Wolf: Tai Yang erwacht – director: Wolfgang Langhoff (Deutsches Theater Berlin)
- 1962: Peter Hacks (after Aristophanes): Der Frieden – director: Benno Besson (Deutsches Theater Berlin)
- 1963: Rolf Schneider: Prozeß Richard Waverly – director: Wolf-Dieter Panse (Deutsches Theater Berlin – Kammerspiele)
- 1963: Peter Hacks (after John Gay): Polly oder Die Bataille am Bluewater Creek
- 1980: Mikhail Shatrov: Blaue Pferde auf rotem Gras – director: Christoph Schroth (Berliner Ensemble)
- 1981: Carl Sternheim: Die Schule von Uznach – director: Gertrud-Elisabeth Zillmer (Volksbühne Berlin – Sternfoyer)
- Faust I (Johann Wolfgang von Goethe)

=== Radio play music ===
- 1950: Herbert Horn: Unsere Brücke – director: Rudolph Pallas (Berliner Rundfunk)
- 1950: Anna Seghers: Der Prozess der Jeanne d’Arc zu Rouen 1431 – director: Herwart Grosse (Deutschlandsender)
- 1964: Ernst Röhl (after Johann Peter Hebel): Zundelfrieders Abenteuer – director: Maritta Hübner (Kinderhörspiel – Rundfunk der DDR

== Publications ==
- Jazz – Analysen und Aspekte, VEB Lied der Zeit, Berlin 1966 (4th, revised and expanded ed. 1985)
