= Grete Hinterhofer =

Austrian composer, pianist and music educator

Grete Hinterhofer (18 July 1899 – 27 June 1985) was an Austrian pianist, music teacher and composer.

== Life ==
Hinterhofer was born in Wels. Her father was a teacher, and her mother was a piano teacher and composer. At the age of nine, Hinterhofer received her first private piano lessons from Cäcilie (von) Frank (1851-1936?), who ran an illustrious musical salon in the 1st district of Vienna and was piano accompanist to the Hellmesberger Quartet and Arnold Rosé. She received extensive artistic training from her and made several public appearances that were reviewed in local newspapers. Cäcilie (von) Frank's apartment was also an important meeting place for the Viennese musical world. One of Hinterhofer's schoolmates was Arnold Schönberg's student Vilma von Webenau.

She also took piano lessons in 1909/10 at the Universität für Musik und darstellende Kunst Wien with Hugo Reinhold and 1914 with Emil von Sauer. In 1917, she passed the state examination for piano and afterwards worked as a concert pianist. Later, she studied organ at the Vienna Music Academy from 1924 to 1927 with Franz Schütz and music theory with Franz Schmidt. From 1927, she taught there herself, from 1932 as a professor, until her retirement in 1969. Among her students were the composers Andre Asriel, Erich Urbanner, Rolf Alexander Wilhelm and Wolfgang Gabriel, the organist Bernhard Billeter and the pianist Harald Ossberger. Hinterhofer performed as a concert pianist under Richard Strauss's and others' direction. She dedicated herself to the performance of works by contemporary composers such as Karl Schiske, whose Rhapsody for piano she played in 1950 in the Brahms Hall of the Österreichische Gesellschaft für zeitgenössische Musik.

Hinterhofer died in Vienna at age 85.

== Literatur ==
- Eva Marx, Gerlinde Haas: 210 österreichische Komponistinnen vom 16. Jahrhundert bis zur Gegenwart: Biographie, Werk und Bibliographie: ein Lexikon. Residenz, Salzburg 2001, p. 464. ISBN 3-7017-1215-8.
- Susanne Wosnitzka: "Gemeinsame Not verstärkt den Willen" – Netzwerke von Musikerinnen in Wien, in Annkatrin Babbe und Volker Timmermann (ed.): Musikerinnen und ihre Netzwerke im 19. Jahrhundert. Oldenburg 2016 (Schriftenreihe des Sophie Drinker Instituts (ed. Freia Hoffmann), vol. 12). ISBN 978-3-8142-2338-4.
