= Baldur Brönnimann =

Swiss conductor

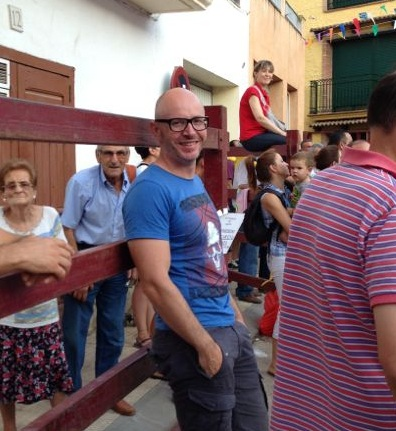
Baldur Brönnimann

Baldur Brönnimann (born 1968, Basel) is a Swiss conductor.

== Biography ==
Born in Basel, Brönnimann studied at the Musik-Akademie der Stadt Basel and was a junior fellow in conducting at the Royal Northern College of Music in Manchester. From 2008 to 2012, Brönniman was the music director of the National Symphony Orchestra of Colombia, and from 2011 to 2015, he was artistic director of Norway's BIT20 Ensemble. Brönnimann was principal conductor of the Orquestra Sinfonica do Porto Casa da Música from 2015 to 2020. Brönnimann became the first-ever principal conductor of the Basel Sinfonietta in 2016. He is scheduled to stand down as principal conductor at the close of the 2022-2023 season.

Brönnimann has conducted the music of contemporary composers such as Harrison Birtwistle, Unsuk Chin, Thomas Adès, John Adams, Kaija Saariaho, Helmut Lachenmann, and Magnus Lindberg. Brönnimann made his operatic debut with English National Opera (ENO) in 2008 with Olga Neuwirth's Lost Highway. He returned to ENO for productions of John Adams' The Death of Klinghoffer (Tom Morris directing) and La Fura dels Baus's production of Ligeti's Le Grand Macabre, a work which he also conducted at the Teatro Colón, Argentina, and at Komische Oper Berlin in the Barrie Kosky revival in 2013.

Brönniman has made several commercial recordings, including a recording of works by Pascal Dusapin, with the Orquestra Sinfónica do Porto Casa da Música and the Remix Ensemble, and an album of György Ligeti concertos and his Melodien, with the BIT20 Ensemble.

Cultural offices
Preceded by (no predecessor)	Principal Conductor, Basel Sinfonietta; 2016-present	Succeeded by incumbent
