= Olga Neuwirth =

Austrian composer (born 1968)

- Born: 4 August 1968 (age 58); Graz, Austria
- Occupation: Composer
- Parent: Harald Neuwirth
- Awards: Großer Österreichischer Staatspreis; Deutscher Musikautorenpreis; Robert Schumann Prize for Poetry and Music; Wolf Prize in Arts; Opus Klassik; Grawemeyer Award for Music Composition; Ernst von Siemens Music Prize

Olga Neuwirth (Austrian German: [ˈɔlɡa ˈnɔʏvɪrt]; born 4 August 1968) is an Austrian contemporary classical composer, visual artist and author. She is famed especially for her operas and music theater works, many of which have treated sociopolitical themes. She has emphasized an open-ended, interdisciplinary approach in her work, collaborating frequently with Elfriede Jelinek, exploiting live electronics, and incorporating video. In her opera Lost Highway, she adapted David Lynch's surrealist film by the same name. She has also written music for historic and contemporary films. Luigi Nono inspired her both musically and politically.

== Biography ==
=== Youth ===
Neuwirth was born in Graz, the daughter of Griseldis Neuwirth and pianist Harald Neuwirth. She is the niece of Gösta Neuwirth and the sister of sculptor Flora Neuwirth. As a child at the age of seven, Neuwirth began lessons on the trumpet but was forced to abandon her original plans to study trumpet after an accident that left her with a jaw injury.

=== Studies and formative experiences ===
As a high school student, Neuwirth took part in composition workshops with Hans Werner Henze and Gerd Kühr. At the age of 16, she met writer Elfriede Jelinek, the winner of the Nobel Prize for Literature, and the two artists have since enjoyed an artistically "fruitful collaboration". The then-17-year-old composer named her first commissioned composition Die gelbe Kuh tanzt Ragtime. The work was composed for the opening of the steirischer herbst festival in 1985.

In 1985/86, she studied music and art at the San Francisco Conservatory of Music with Elinor Armer. She also studied painting and film at the San Francisco Art College. She continued her studies at the University of Music and Performing Arts Vienna under Erich Urbanner while studying at the Institute for Composition and Electroacoustics. Her master's thesis was written on the film score of Alain Resnais's L'Amour à mort.

In 1993/94 she studied with Tristan Murail and worked at IRCAM, producing such works as ...?risonanze!... for viola d'amore. She received significant inspiration in this period from Adriana Hölszky (Nicht beirren lassen! Weitermachen!) and Luigi Nono, who had similarly radical politics, and who she said was a strong influence in her life.

=== Adulthood and advocacy ===
Neuwirth has served as a professor at the University of Music and Performing Arts in Vienna since 2021. She is a member of the Bavarian Academy of Fine Arts, the Academy of Arts (Berlin) and the Royal Swedish Academy of Music.

Neuwirth has long reflected on the everyday life of professional composers, especially women composers, who are marginalized within contemporary art circles. She has conveyed her thoughts on this issue in a number of texts. She frequently expresses herself on political issues more broadly, calling for vigilance in the face of social and political changes (for example, with a speech in front of the Vienna State Opera at a mass protest held on 19 September 2000, entitled "I will not be yodeled out of existence").

== Music ==
Neuwirth has created several full-length music theatre works, including the video opera Lost Highway (2003), based on David Lynch's film; Bählamms Fest (1993/1997), drawing on the work of Leonora Carrington; The Outcast, referencing Herman Melville; and American Lulu, her free adaptation of Alban Berg's Lulu. She collaborated with Elfriede Jelinek on the opera Bählamms Fest.

Neuwirth's opera of David Lynch's film Lost Highway incorporates both live and pre-recorded audio and visual feeds, alongside other electronics. Its premiere took place in Graz in 2003, performed by the Klangforum Wien with the electronics realized at the Institut für Elektronische Musik (IEM). The American premiere of the opera took place at Oberlin College in Oberlin, Ohio, and featured further performances at Columbia University's Miller Theatre in New York City, produced by Oberlin Conservatory and the Oberlin Contemporary Music Ensemble. The surround-sound recording released by Kairos was awarded the Diapason d'Or. The UK premiere took place at the Young Vic in London in April 2008, in a co-production with the English National Opera, directed by Diane Paulus and conducted by Baldur Brönnimann.

Neuwirth's opera Orlando:A fictional musical biography in 19 Scenes, based on the novel by Virginia Woolf, is the first full-length opera composed by a woman and commissioned by the Vienna State Opera to be performed in Vienna. The world premiere took place on 8 December 2019. It was later selected as the world premiere of the year in an international critics' poll conducted by the trade journal Opernwelt.

She also has numerous chamber music works released on the Kairos label.

=== Style ===
Neuwirth's original compositional style is characterized by the use of diverse compositional techniques and hybrid sound materials, with a constant questioning of artistic and sociopolitical norms. She refers to an "art in-between". Stefan Drees remarked:

The catastrophic, the plunge into unfamiliar regions with all the attendant consequences, is therefore a fundamental mood of her compositions, winding like a red thread through her works.

==== Openness ====
Usually assigned to the category of contemporary classical music, her works since the late 1980s have sought to transcend the genre restrictions imposed by the music business. She has drawn from a range of sources for inspiration, including "art, architecture, literature and music, intellectual history, psychology, natural science, and everyday reality". Her aim has been to create works that are both distinctive and multidimensional. For example, in Le Encantadas o le avventure nel mare delle meraviglie (2014), Neuwirth has been described as creating a "fictional adventure novel through multiple spatial sound effects", drawing on Herman Melville's novella The Encantadas (1894) and Luigi Nono's sound world, especially that of his 1984 Prometeo. The starting point of this composition is an acoustical survey (Neuwirth: "preservation of acoustic heritage") of the Chiesa San Lorenzo in Venice.

In the 1990s, Neuwirth began crossing genre boundaries between theatrical drama, opera, radio drama, performance art and video. She has expressed interest in a broad spectrum of stimuli and possibilities of expression. This has been reflected in the titles of her works, for example in The Outcast, a musicstallation-theater with video.

==== Innovative means ====
Neuwirth often set herself the goal of breaking up established forms of concert presentation in order to arrive at a "fluid form". For example, during the breaks in her two "portrait concerts" at the 1998 Salzburg Festival, the sound of wind-up toy instruments on a reinforced metal plate was transmitted into the concert hall's auditorium by means of several loudspeakers, with visuals projected live onto a screen, creating an immersive listening experience. In addition, "prompt texts" for the audience's behavior, written by Jelinek, were inserted into the work.

Neuwirth's works have expanded from the concert hall into public spaces, for example in Talking Houses (1996), a sound installation for shops along the main square of Deutschlandsberg, Austria (created jointly with Hans Hoffer), and in the sound installation ...le temps désechanté ... ou dialogue aux enfers (2005) at the Place Igor Stravinsky in Paris (near the Stravinsky Fountain). For this latter work, commissioned in 2005 by IRCAM Paris, a motion-capture camera was used to allow electroacoustic sounds to interact with the streams of people moving through the square. As the number of passers-by rose, a musical transformation was set in motion. However, the Paris police ultimately ordered the sound installation to be shut down.

==== Interdisciplinary collaboration ====
Neuwirth frequently collaborates with artists working in other disciplines or mediums, such as architect Peter Zumthor (Bregenz 2017), the New York architects of Asymptote Architecture (ZKM 2017), and the computer music and audio/acoustics research artist Markus Noisternig. She worked with video artist Tal Rosner to create the interactive installation Disenchanted Island at Centre Pompidou in Paris (2016).

She is interested in the relationship between music and visual art and has continually expanded the scope of her activities by writing texts and film scripts, producing short films, and organizing performances and photo series. In 2007, she participated in the documenta 12 contemporary art exhibition, for which she produced a sound/film installation. She recently collaborated with French installation, video, and conceptual artist Dominique Gonzales-Foerster on the multimedia installation ...ce qui arrive.…

=== Film scores ===
Olga Neuwirth has also composed a number of film scores, including music for the silent films Symphonie diagonale (1924), Maudite soit la Guerre (1914) and City Without Jews (1924), as well as soundtracks to films by Kurt Mayer and Josef Dabernig. The composer also wrote music for the feature films Das Vaterspiel by director Michael Glawogger, which was screened at the Berlinale film festival in 2009, and Ich seh, Ich seh by directors Veronika Franz and Severin Fiala, which premiered in 2014 at the Venice International Film Festival.

== Reception ==
=== Commissions and music residencies ===
Neuwirth has received commissions from international institutions including Carnegie Hall, the Lucerne Festival, the Salzburg Festival, the Elbphilharmonie Hamburg, the Vienna State Opera and many others. She was composer in residence at the Salzburg Festival in 1999, the Koninklijk Filharmonisch Orkest van Vlaanderen in Antwerp in 2000, the Lucerne Festival in both 2002 and 2016, the Festival d'Automne in 2011, and the Elbphilharmonie Hamburg and the Wiener Konzerthaus in 2019.

=== Performing relationships ===
Her works have been performed by the conductors Pierre Boulez, Peter Eötvös, Daniel Harding, Matthias Pintscher, Valerij Gergjev, Susanna Mälkki, François-Xavier Roth and Alan Gilbert, among others. Leading orchestras and ensembles have included Neuwirth's compositions in their programs, including the Vienna Philharmonic, the Berliner Philharmoniker, the New York Philharmonic Orchestra, the Scottish Symphony Orchestra, the Deutsches Symphonie-Orchester Berlin, the BBC Symphony Orchestra, the London Symphony Orchestra, the Orchestre Philharmonique de Radio France, the NDR Symphony Orchestra, the Bavarian Radio Symphony Orchestra, the ORF Radio Symphony Orchestra, Ensemble Intercontemporain, the Ensemble Modern, the ICE Ensemble, the Talea Ensemble, Klangforum Wien, the London Sinfonietta, Ensemble Musikfabrik, the Phace Ensemble and the Arditti Quartet.

Numerous soloists, including Hakan Hardenberger, Antoine Tamestit, Thomas Larcher, Jochen Kowalski, Robyn Schulkowsky, Marino Formenti, Claire Chase and Andrew Watts have participated in performances of Neuwirth's works.

=== Awards ===
- 1997: Erste-Bank-Kompositionspreis
- 1999: Hindemith Prize, Ernst von Siemens Composer Prize
- 2000: Ernst-Krenek-Preis for the opera Bählamms Fest
- 2008: Heidelberger Künstlerinnenpreis (Heidelberg Prize for Female Artists)
- 2009: South Bank Show Award for Lost Highway
- 2010: Großer Österreichischer Staatspreis
- 2010: Louis Spohr Musikpreis Braunschweig
- 2011: Nominated for the Österreichischer Filmpreis (film score to Das Vaterspiel)
- 2014: Nominated for the Österreichischer Filmpreis (film score to Ich seh Ich seh)
- 2016: Eighth Roche Commission
- 2017: Deutscher Musikautorenpreis (category "Komposition Orchester")
- 2019: Prize of the Christoph and Stephan Kaske Foundation
- 2019: Österreichisches Ehrenzeichen für Wissenschaft und Kunst
- 2020: Robert Schumann Prize for Poetry and Music
- 2021: Wolf Prize in Arts Laureate in Music 2021
- 2021: Opus Klassik: composer of the year
- 2022: Grawemeyer Award for Music Composition for her opera Orlando
- 2022: Ernst von Siemens Music Prize

== Selected works ==
Most of Neuwirth's works have been published by Ricordi and Boosey & Hawkes:

=== Stage works ===
- Körperliche Veränderungen and Der Wald (1989/1990), two operas with Elfriede Jelinek
- Bählamms Fest (1997/98), music theatre in thirteen pictures after the work of Leonora Carrington, with Elfriede Jelinek
- Lost Highway (2002–2003), opera based on David Lynch's 1997 film Lost Highway
- American Lulu (2006–2011), free adaptation of Berg's Lulu
- The Outcast – Homage to Herman Melville (2009–2011), a "musicstallation theatre" with video, libretto by Barry Gifford and Olga Neuwirth, and monologues for Old Melville by Anna Mitgutsch
- Kloing! and A songplay in 9 fits, Hommage à Klaus Nomi (2011), a music-theatre evening
- Orlando (2019), opera based on Virginia Woolf's Orlando: A Biography, commissioned by Wiener Staatsoper
- Monster's Paradise (2026), satire/horror opera about a king-president in an oval office; libretto by Elfriede Jelinek

=== Concertos (or soloist and orchestra) ===
- Sans soleil (1994) for two ondes martenot, orchestra, and live-electronics
- Photophorus (1997) for two E-Guitars and orchestra
- locus...doublure...solus (2001) for piano and orchestra (version for orchestra)
- Zefiro aleggia...nell´infinito... (2004) for bassoon and orchestra
- … miramondo multiplo … (2006) for trumpet and orchestra
- Remnants of songs...an Amphigory (2009) for viola and orchestra
- Trurliade – Zone Zero (2016) for percussion and orchestra
- Zones of Blue (2026), Rhapsody for clarinet and orchestra

=== Orchestra ===
- Clinamen / Nodus (1999)
- anaptyxis (2000)
- Masaot/Clocks without Hands (2013)
- Keyframes for a Hippogriff − Musical Calligrams in memoriam Hester Diamond (2019) for orchestra, countertenor and boys´ choir

=== Mixed ensemble ===
- Elfi und Andi (1997) for speaker, e-guitar, double bass, bass clarinet, saxophone and two playback-CDs (voice from tape: Marianne Hoppe). With texts by Elfriede Jelinek
- The Long Rain A video opera with surround-screens (1999/2000) for 4 soloists, 4 ensemble groups, live-electronic, after a story by Ray Bradbury
- Construction in space (2000) for 4 soloists, 4 ensemble groups and live-electronic
- Hommage à Klaus Nomi (2009) Chamber orchestra version
- Ishmaela's White World (2012)
- Eleanor (2014/2015) for a female blues singer, drum-kit-player, ensemble and samples
- Aello – ballet mécanomorphe (2016/2017) for flute, 2 trumpets, strings, synthesizer and typewriter

=== Chamber music ===
- Akroate Hadal (1995) for string quartet
- Ondate II (1998) for two bass clarinets
- Hommage à Klaus Nomi (1998) for countertenor and small ensemble
- voluta / sospeso (1999) for basset horn, clarinet, violin, violoncello, percussion and piano
- ...ad auras... in memoriam H. (1999)
- settori (1999) for string quartet
- Zwei Räthsel von W.A.M. (1999) Text: W. A. Mozart, Leopold Mozart; for coloratura soprano, alto, viola, cello, cymbals, tape, and live electronics
- ... ce qui arrive ... (with an interactive live video by Dominique Gonzales-Foerster) (2003/2004) for 2 groups, samples and live-electronic after Paul Auster
- In Nacht und Eis (2006) for bassoon, cello with ringmodulator
- Kloing! (2007) for computer-aided CEUS-piano and interactive live video
- Hommage à Klaus Nomi (2009) for chamber orchestra
- in the realms of the unreal (2009) for string quartet
- Quasare / Pulsare II (2017) for violin, cello and piano
- CoronAtion Cycle (2020) CoronAtion IV/Version I, a 9-hours-long live sound installation for Robyn Schulkowsky and Joey Baron

=== Solo works ===
- Marsyas (2003–2004, revised 2006) for piano
- Trurl-Tichy-Tinkle (2016) for piano

== See also ==
- List of Austrians in music
