= Lost Highway (opera) =

2003 opera

- Opera by Olga Neuwirth
- Librettist: Elfriede Jelinek
- Language: English
- Based on: David Lynch's 1997 film Lost Highway
- Premiere: 2003; Steirischer Herbst, Graz

Lost Highway is a 2003 opera adaptation of the 1997 David Lynch film of the same name, by Austrian composer Olga Neuwirth with the libretto by 2004 Nobel Prize-winner Elfriede Jelinek.

== Premieres ==
The opera was premiered in Graz in 2003 at the Steirischer Herbst Festival of New Music with the live-electronics and sound design realized at the Institute of Electronic Music and Acoustics (IEM) using the open source software Pure Data, conducted by Johannes Kalitzke.

It made its American premiere at Finney Chapel in Oberlin, Ohio, and at the Miller Theater in New York City in February 2007, in a production performed by students from the Oberlin Conservatory of Music. It was directed by Jonathon Field, with sound design by Tom Lopez, produced by Lewis Nielson, and set design by Scott Dane Knowles. Barry Bryan portrayed Fred Madison.

It premiered in the UK in an ENO production at the Young Vic in April 2008. This production was directed by Diane Paulus, with set and costume design by Riccardo Hernandez, video design by Philip Bussmann, lighting design by Mimi Jordan Sherin and sound design by Markus Noisternig. The cast included Mark Bonnar as Fred Madison, Quirijn de Lang as Pete Dayton, Valérie MacCarthy as Renne/Alice, Christopher Robson as The Mystery Man and David Moss as Mr Eddy/Dick Laurent.

The German premiere was staged at the Bockenheimer Depot in Frankfurt by Yuval Sharon, with David Moss, among others.

== Roles ==
| Role | Voice type | Premiere cast, 2003 Conductor: Johannes Kalitzke |
|---|---|---|
| Pete | high baritone | Georg Nigl |
| Fred | actor | Vincent Crowley |
| Alice / Renee | soprano | Constance Hauman |
| Mr. Eddy / Dick Laurent | singer / actor / improvising musician | David Moss |
| Mystery Man | countertenor | Andrew Watts |
| Andy | countertenor | |
| Pete's mother | actress, also singing | |
| Pete's father | actor, also singing | |
| Guard / Detective Lou | actor, also singing | |
| Doctor / The Man / Detective Hank | actor, also singing | |
| Director of prison / Arnie | actor, also singing | |

== Reception ==
In 2019, writers of The Guardian ranked Lost Highway the 13th greatest work of art music since 2000.
