= Vasks =

Vasks may refer to:

- Pēteris Vasks (born 1946), Latvian composer
- 16513 Vasks, main-belt asteroid
