= Robert Schumann Prize =

Robert Schumann Prize may refer to:

- Robert Schumann Prize for Poetry and Music
- Robert Schumann Prize of the City of Zwickau
