= Der Lotterieschwede =

1958 film

- Directed by: Joachim Kunert
- Written by: Martin Andersen Nexø
- Starring: Erwin Geschonneck
- Music by: André Asriel
- Release date: 1958
- Country: East Germany
- Language: German

Der Lotterieschwede is an East German film. It was released in 1958.
