= Gösta Neuwirth =

Austrian musicologist

- Born: 6 January 1937 (age 89); Vienna, Austria
- Education: Wiener Musikakademie; University of Vienna; Free University of Berlin
- Occupations: Composer; Musicologist
- Organizations: Musikhochschule Graz; University of Graz; Universität der Künste Berlin; University of Freiburg
- Awards: Hugo Wolf Prize; Preis der Stadt Wien für Musik; Maria-Ensle-Preis

Gösta Neuwirth (German: ['gœsta 'nɔʏvɪrt]; born 6 January 1937) is an Austrian musicologist, composer and academic teacher. He studied in Vienna and Berlin, where he wrote a dissertation on harmony in Franz Schreker's Der ferne Klang. He has taught at universities and music schools including the Musikhochschule Graz, University of Graz, Hochschule der Künste Berlin and University of Freiburg. His compositions include a string quartet and a chamber opera.

== Life ==
Born in Vienna, Neuwirth comes from a musical family; the pianist Harald Neuwirth is his brother, whose daughter Olga Neuwirth is a composer. He received instruction in violin and piano starting in 1944. He studied composition with Karl Schiske at the Wiener Musikakademie, and music and theatre at the University of Vienna. His dissertation topic in musicology, Anton Webern, was not accepted. After a brief period as a journalist at the Neue Zeit in Graz, he continued his studies from 1963 at the Free University of Berlin with Adam Adrio. In 1968 he received his doctorate in Berlin with a dissertation on harmony in Schreker's Der ferne Klang (Die Harmonik in der Oper "Der ferne Klang" von Franz Schreker).

From 1968 to 1970, Neuwirth worked in the Mendelssohn-Archiv of the Stiftung Preußischer Kulturbesitz and from 1970 to 1972 was affiliated with the Schönberg-Gesamtausgabe initiative. From 1973 to 1982, Neuwirth headed the electronic studio of the Musikhochschule Graz and lectured on music history at both the Musikhochschule and the University of Graz. From 1982 to 2000 he was a professor of music theory at the Hochschule der Künste Berlin. Since 2009 he has been an honorary professor at the University of Freiburg.

Numerous renowned composers, including Bernhard Lang, Peter Ablinger, Georg Friedrich Haas, Arnulf Herrmann, Isabel Mundry, Hanspeter Kyburz, Orm Finnendahl, Enno Poppe and Oliver Korte, are among his students. For his 70th birthday, the 2007 Styriarte festival organized a tribute with his and Schreker's works. On the occasion of his 80th birthday, the Society of Friends of Music in Donaueschingen (Germany) organized a concert with works by Neuwirth as well as his teacher Karl Schiske and his students Peter Ablinger and Martin Kapeller.

== Awards ==
- 1975 Förderpreis of Graz
- 1976 Hugo Wolf-Preis
- 1988 Johann Joseph Fux-Preis of Styria
- 1995 Preis der Stadt Wien für Musik
- 2002 Maria-Ensle-Preis of the Kunststiftung Baden-Württemberg
- 2008 Erste Bank Prize
- Kompositionspreis des Musikprotokolls

== Publications ==
- Franz Schreker, Vienna 1959
- Parsifal und der musikalische Jugendstil, in Richard Wagner. Werk und Wirkung, edited by Carl Dahlhaus (Studien zur Musikgeschichte des 19. Jahrhunderts, volume 26), Regensburg 1971, pp. 179–198
- Arnold Schönberg, Von heute auf morgen. Text und Skizzen, edited by Gösta Neuwirth (Arnold Schönberg, Sämtliche Werke, Abt. 111, Bühnenwerke, series B, Rd. 7/I), Mainz 1972. Kritischer Bericht dazu (with Tadeusz Okuljar), Mainz 1974
- Alexander Zemlinskys Sechs Gesänge für eine mittlere Stimme nach Texten von Maurice Maeterlinck op. 13 und Franz Schrekers Fünf Gesänge für eine tiefe Stimme. Ein Vergleich, in Alexander Zemlinsky. Tradition im Umkreis der Wiener Schule (Studien zur Wertungsforschung, volume 7), Vienna 1976, pp. 111–119
- Wozzeck I, 1. Formdisposition und musikalisches Material, in 50 Jahre Wozzeck von Alban Berg. Vorgeschichte und Auswirkungen in der Opernästhetik (Studien zur Wertungsforschung, volume 10), Vienna 1978, pp. 46–56
- Zur Alexander Skrjabin-Renaissance, in Österreichische Musikzeitschrift, 33rd year (1978), pp. 421–435
- Der späte Schreker and Ein unbekanntes Lied Schrekers, in Franz Schreker. Am Beginn der Neuen Musik (Studien zur Wertungsforschung, volume 11), Vienna 1978, pp. 106–114
- Schönbergs George-Lieder Op. 19. Die Entwürfe zum XIV. Lied, in Bericht über den Kongreß der Internationalen Schönberg-Gesellschaft Wien 1974, edited by Rudolf Stephan, Vienna 1978, pp. 147–158
- Symbol und Form, in Johann Joseph Fux, Litaneien, Vespern, Kompletorien (complete work, volume 2,2), Kassel 1979, pp. X–XV
- Musik um 1900, in Art nouveau. Jugendstil und Musik, edited by Jürg Stenzl, Zürich 1980, pp. 89–133
- ROTAS – SATOR. For Ernst Krenek dated 23 August 1980, in Österreichische Musikzeitschrift, 35th year (1980), pp. 461–472. Reprint in Ernst Krenek (Musik-Konzepte, volume 39/40), Munich 1984, pp. 78–91
- Foreword, in Franz Schreker, Kammersymphonie in einem Satz,; (1916). Vienna 1981, pp. II–VII
- Themen und Zeitstrukturen in Alban Bergs Kammerkonzert, in Alban-Berg-Symposion Wien 1980. Tagungsbericht, Vienna 1981, pp. 161–170
- Erzählung von Zahlen, in Josquin des Prés (Musik-Konzepte, volume 26/27), Munich 1982, pp. 4–38
- Bemerkungen zu einigen späteren Werken Ernst Kreneks, in Ernst Krenek (Studien zur Wertungsforschung, volume 15), Vienna 1982, pp. 202–215. Reprint in Ernst Krenek (Musik-Konzepte, volule 39/40), Munich 1984, pp. 149–160
- Die Zwölftöner. Musik in Fremdheit und Isolation, in Das größere Österreich. Geistiges und soziales Leben von 1880 bis zur Gegenwart, hrsg. von Kristian Sotriffer, Vienna 1982, pp. 204–207
- Die Suche nach der endgültigen Unwirklichkeit, in Anton Webern (Musik-Konzepte Sonderband, volume 1), Munich 1983, pp. 262–268
- Weberns Rede. Wahn & Witz, mit beschränkter Haftung, in Österreichische Musikzeitschrift, 38th year (1983), pp. 614–619; Reprint in: Anton Webern (Musik-Konzepte Sonderband, Band 2), München 1984, pp. 112–136
- Zur Geschichte der 4. Symphonie, in Mahler-Interpretation. Aspekte zum Werk und Wirken von Gustav Mahler, edited by Rudolf Stephan, Mainz 1985, pp. 105–110
- Erda-Scenen, in Richard Wagner's Tristan und Isolde (Musik-Konzepte, volume 57/57), Munich 1987, pp. 135–153
- Die Väter sind sterblich, in Beiträge zur Musikwissenschaft, 32nd year (1990), pp. 63–66
- Kehraus des schönen Wahns, in 1913. Aufbruch in unsere Welt. Essays zur Kunst, Musik, Literatur und Architektur, Wien 1993, pp. 50–97
- Suite, in Töne, Farben, Formen. Über Musik und die bildenden Künste, edited by Elisabeth Schmierer among others, Laaber 1995, pp. 203–221

== Work ==
- Requiem, 1956
- Hommage à Mahler, 1966
- Der Garten der Pfade, die sich verzweigen, 1975
- String quartet, 1976
- Pisspott oder Pot of Pieces, 1973–1981, Neufassung 2017
- Eine wahre Geschichte, chamber opera, 1981
- Sechs Gesänge nach Texten von Maurice Maeterlinck, 1995
