= Das Jagdgewehr =

Opera by Thomas Larcher

Das Jagdgewehr (The Hunting Gun) is a German-language opera in three acts by Thomas Larcher to a libretto by Friederike Gösweiner after the 1949 short novel Ryōjū (猟銃, The Hunting Gun) by Yasushi Inoue. It received its premiere at the Bregenzer Festspiele on 15 August 2018. The UK premiere was at Snape Maltings, Aldeburgh, June 2019.

== Cast ==
- The Poet, who sees the hunter in the snow (tenor)
- Josuke Misugi, the hunter in the snow (baritone)
- Midori, the hunter's wife who asks him for a divorce, (soprano)
- Saiko, his secret lover, who is also Midori's cousin and best friend (mezzo-soprano)
- Shoko, Josuke and Saiko's daughter (soprano)

== Recordings ==
- Larcher: Das Jagdgewehr: Sarah Aristidou (Shoko), Giulia Peri (Midori), Olivia Vermeulen (Saiko), Robin Tritschler (The Poet), Andrè Schuen (Josuke Misugi), Ensemble Modern, Michael Boder 2020, C Major
