= Basel Sinfonietta =

- Orchestra
- Founded: 1980; 46 years ago
- Location: Basel, Switzerland
- Principal conductor: Titus Engel

The Basel Sinfonietta is a Swiss orchestra, based in Basel.

== History ==
The Basel Sinfonietta was founded in 1980, as a self-governing ensemble, by a group of young musicians with a focus on contemporary classical music. The orchestra has presented more than 50 world premieres, many of them commissioned by the orchestra itself, such as Siegel (2008) and Viaggiatori (2011) by Andrea Lorenzo Scartazzini. The Sinfonietta is the only Swiss orchestra to have been invited four times to participate in the famous Austrian Salzburger Festspiele. The orchestra has performed at festivals such as the Internationale Ferienkurse für Neue Musik, the Lucerne Festival, the Biennale di Venezia, Musica Strasbourg, the Festival d'Automne Paris and Kunstfest Weimar.

Baldur Brönnimann became the first-ever principal conductor of the orchestra in 2016. Brönnimann is scheduled to stand down as principal conductor at the close of the 2022-2023 season. In December 2021, the orchestra announced the appointment of Titus Engel as its next principal conductor, effective with the 2023-2024 season.

== Principal conductors ==
- Baldur Brönnimann (2016–present)
