= Netzwerk (film) =

- Directed by: Ralf Kirsten
- Music by: André Asriel
- Release date: 3 September 1970
- Country: East Germany
- Language: German

Netzwerk is an East German film. It was released in 1970.
