= Erich Urbanner =

Austrian composer and teacher (born 1936)

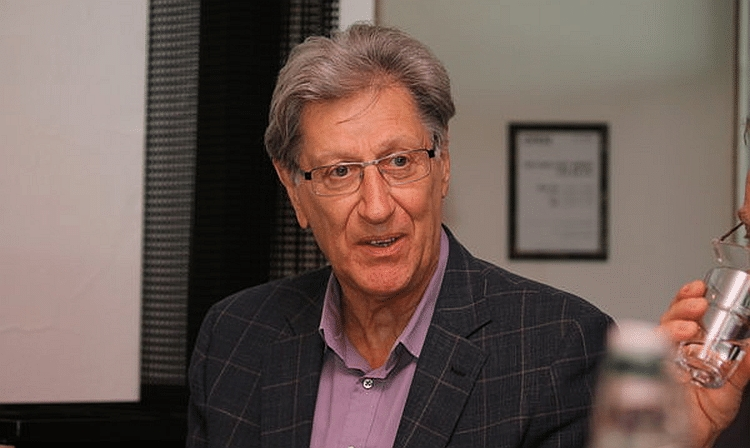
Erich Urbanner

Erich Urbanner (born 26 March 1936) is an Austrian composer and teacher.

== Biography ==
Born in Innsbruck, Urbanner studied from 1955 to 1961 at the University of Music and Performing Arts in Vienna, in the composition classes of Karl Schiske and Hanns Jelinek, as well as studying piano with Grete Hinterhofer and conducting with Hans Swarowsky. At the Darmstadt International Summer Courses for New Music he participated in further composition studies with Wolfgang Fortner, Karlheinz Stockhausen und Bruno Maderna.

From 1961 he taught score-reading at the University of Music and Performing Arts in Vienna, becoming full professor of composition and harmony and counterpoint in 1969. Between 1969 and 1974 he was director of the seminar for twelve-tone music, and from 1986 to 1989 he was director of the Institute for Electro-acoustic and Experimental Music. Amongst his pupils are the composers Olga Neuwirth, Thomas Larcher, Gilles Bellemare, Johanna Doderer, Miguel del Aguila, Clemens Gadenstätter, Wolfram Wagner, James Poke, Lukas Ligeti, Alexander Wagendristl and Gerhard Schedl.

Amongst Urbanner's compositions are works for solo instruments, chamber music, orchestral works, including a number of concertos, a mass and a requiem as well as several operas. Amongst his many prizes are the Composition Prize of the City of Innsbruck (1980), the Music Prize of the City of Vienna (1984) and the Grand Decoration of Honour in Silver for Services to the Republic of Austria (2001). He is published by Doblinger Musik Verlag. Since 1968 he has also been active as a conductor.

== Selected works ==
=== Operas and music theatre works ===
- Der Gluckerich or Tugend und Tadel der Nützlichkeit a musical burlesque in 3 acts after Guy de Maupassant (1963)
- Ninive or Das Leben geht weiter an opera in 2 parts (7 scenes) after the Book of Jonah (1987)
- Johannes Stein or Der Rock des Kaisers monodrama for female speaker, 4 4 male voices and orchestra (1991, 1994)

=== Orchestral works ===
- Prolog for orchestra on "Innsbruck, ich muß dich lassen" (1957)
- Intrada for chamber orchestra (1957)
- Symphony in one movement (1963)
- Serenade for string orchestra (1965)
- Rondeau for large orchestra (1967)
- Theme, 19 Variations and a Postlude for orchestra (1968)
- Kontraste II for orchestra (1970)
- Retrospectives for pieces for large orchestra (1974–75)
- Pastorale for orchestra (1975)
- Sinfonietta 79 for chamber orchestra (1979)
- Sonata Brevis for chamber orchestra (1980)
- Sinfonia concertante for chamber orchestra (1982)
- Multiphonie for large orchestra (1998)
- Begegnungen for large orchestra (2005–06)

=== Concertos and concertante works ===
- Piano concerto (1958)
- Flute concertino (1959)
- Concertino for organ and string orchestra (1961)
- Dialogue for piano and orchestra (1965)
- Concerto for oboe and chamber orchestra (1966)
- Violin Concerto (1971)
- Concerto Wolfgang Amadeus for 2 orchestra, 3 trombones and celesta (1972)
- Double Bass Concerto (1973)
- Piano Concerto 76 (1976)
- Concerto for Alto Saxophone in Eb and 12 players, 1978
- Concerto for Violoncello and Orchestra (1981)
- Double Concerto for flute, clarinet and orchestra (1984)
- Concerto for saxophone quartet and string orchestra (1989)
- Concerto XIII for saxophone quartet and 9 players (1989–90)
- Piano Concerto No. 4, (2002–03)
- Concerto for Accordion and Nine Instruments (2003)

=== Chamber music ===
- First String Quartet (1956)
- Second String Quartet (1957)
- Schlag- und Klangfiguren for percussion ensemble (1964)
- Etüde for wind quintet (1965)
- Improvisation III for 10 instruments (1969)
- Improvisation IV for wind quintet (1969)
- Lyrica for 11 instruments (1971)
- Third String Quartet (1972)
- Takes for piano trio (1977)
- Quartetto concertato for string quartet and 6 string duos (1978)
- Nocturne for recorder ensemble (1978)
- Emotions for saxophone quartet (1984)
- Sechs Phan-Tasten und zwei Schlagzeuger for 2 pianos, celesta, harpsichord, positive organ, harmonium and percussion (1980)
- Nonett 1981 for flute, clarinet, bass clarinet, tenor-bass trombone, guitar, piano, violin, cello and double bass (1981)
- Trio mobile for flute, viola and cello (1987)
- ... in Bewegung ... trio in two movements for violin, cello and piano (1990)
- Fourth String Quartet (1991–92)
- Duo for accordion and double bass (1992)
- quasi una fantasia six concertante pieces for 15 instruments (1993)
- begegnung - variation - wiederbegegnung for 12 instrumentalists (1996)
- Quartett for violin, clarinet, tenor saxophone and piano (1998)
- Fifth. String Quartet (2001)
- Duo for Two Guitars, (2003)

=== Works for solo instrument ===
Works for piano

- First Sonatina for piano (1956)
- Second Sonatina for piano (1957)
- Variations for piano (1958)
- Variation for piano (1958)
- Five Pieces for piano (1959)
- Elf Bagatellen for piano (1959)
- Improvisation II for 2 pianos (1966)
- Adagio for piano (1966)
- Variations for piano (1981)
- Thirteen Character Pieces for piano (1988–89)
- Forms in Transformation - Piano Piece (1996)

Works for solo instrument and keyboard

- Eight pieces for flute and piano (1957)
- Five Pieces for violin and piano (1961)
- Burlesque for flute and organ (1973)
- Arioso - Furioso for cello and piano (1980)
- Entfaltung for cello and piano (1999)

Other solo works

- Improvisation I for organ (1961)
- Acht Aphorismen - für Flöte, Klarinette und Fagott, 1966
- Four Pieces for viola (1967)
- Five Pieces for flute (1967)
- Solo for violin (1971)
- Ballade for guitar solo 1982
- Zyklus for organ (1993)
- Phantasiestück für Orgel, 1995
- Solo for clarinet in Bb (1997)
- Organ Work 1998 - Suite in Four Movements (1998)
- ... apropos Orgelpunkt ... for guitar solo (1998)
- Reminiscences for solo cello (2005)

=== Vocal music ===
Songs and works for solo voices

- Five Songs for mezzo-soprano and small ensemble (1961)
- Das Ahnenbild for soprano and piano (1961)
- Acht ächte Tyroller Liader for soprano, tenor and chamber ensemble (1985)
- Die Tochter des Kerensteiners, Four Scenes for Music after the Fragment of an Unknown Poet from the 12th Century for 5 solo voices and chamber orchestra (1994)
- Four Moritaten for baritone and non-specific instrumental accompaniment (2000)

Vocal works with choir

- Missa Benedicte Gentes for 4-part mixed choir and organ (1958)
- Requiem for 4 soloists, mixed choir and orchestra (1982–83)
- Three Movements for mixed choir, soloists and cello after poems from "Die Niemandsrose" by Paul Celan (1995)
