= Charles Boone (composer) =

American composer

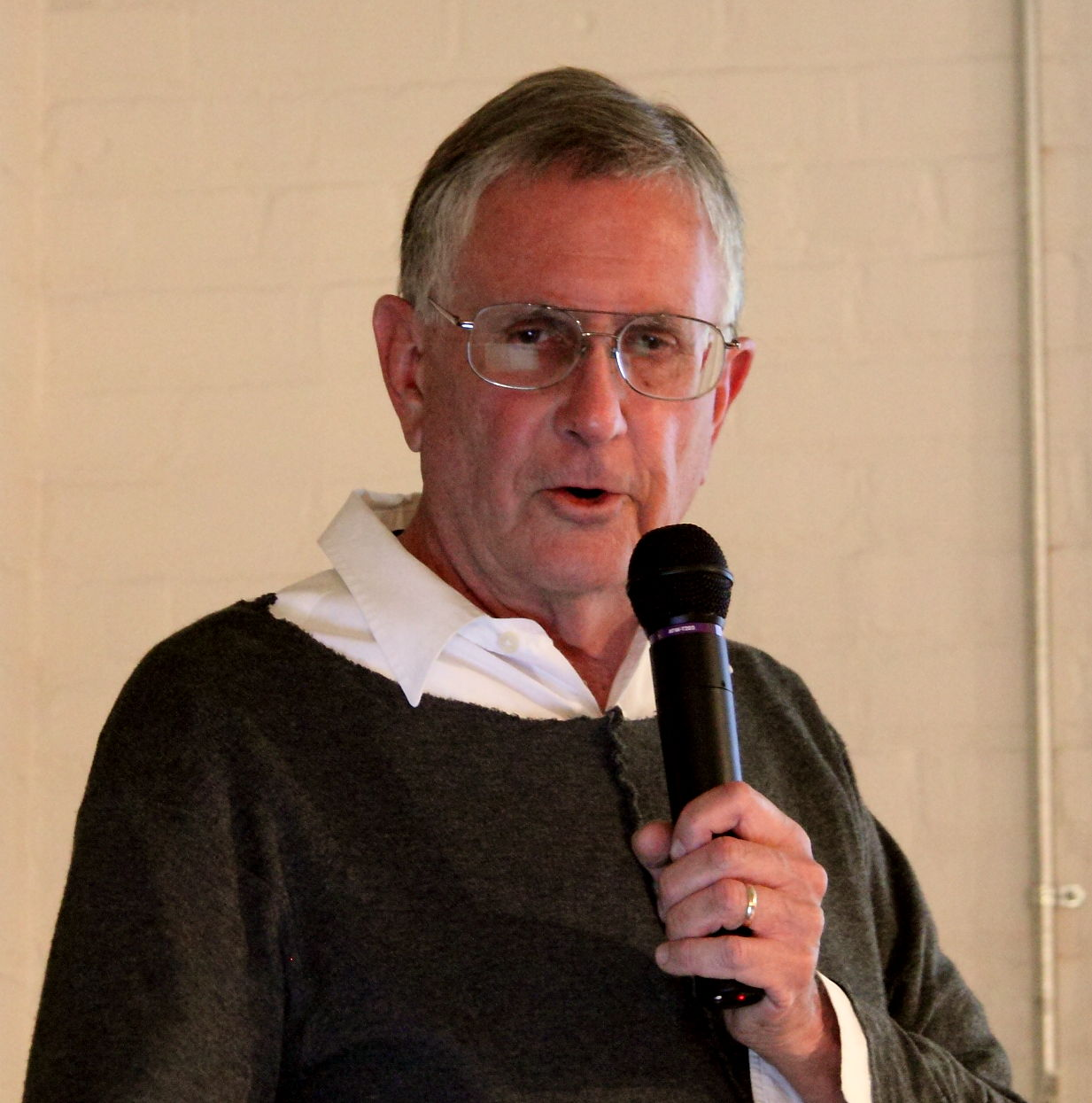
- Born: June 21, 1939 (age 86); Cleveland, OH
- Known for: Composer, Teacher

Charles Boone (born Cleveland, on June 21, 1939) is an American composer of contemporary classical music, living in San Francisco.

== Biography ==
Charles Boone studied at the Akademie für Musik und darstellende Kunst in Vienna, the University of Southern California, and San Francisco State College. Karl Schiske, Adolph Weiss, and Ernst Krenek were among his teachers. He has been awarded three National Endowment for the Arts Commissions as well as a two-year Deutscher Akademischer Austauschdienst (DAAD) artist-in-residency in Berlin. His works have been performed by the San Francisco Symphony, the Chicago Symphony, and the Los Angeles Philharmonic, as well as the Berlin, Avignon, and Ojai Festivals. Performers have included Seiji Ozawa, Edo de Waart, Michael Tilson Thomas, Phyllis Bryn-Julson, Jan Williams, Bertram Turetzky, and Karl Kohn. An archive of the composer's scores, manuscripts, recordings, letters, and other documents is being gathered at the Jean Gray Hargrove Music Library, University of California, Berkeley.

Boone has encountered a number of young people, through teaching and otherwise, who have been meaningful to him. They include Jon Beacham, Dicky Bahto, Claire Jackel, Prumsodun Ok, Rebecca Milsop, Sanghee Park, Jhinryung Oh, Taeko Horigome, Michael Dodge, Masako Tanaka, Ben Wood, Kai-Ting Chuang, Daniel Shin, Peter Varga, and many others.

== Selected works ==
- A Cool Glow of Radiation for flute and electronic sounds (1966)
- Matrix II: The Edge of the Land for orchestra (1968)
- First Landscape for orchestra (1971)
- Vocalise for solo soprano (1972)
- Second Landscape for fifteen players (1973), orchestra version (1980)
- Raspberries for three percussionists (1974)
- Linea Meridiana for nine players (1975)
- San Zeno/Verona for thirteen players (1976)
- String Piece for twelve strings (1978)
- Little Flute Pieces for solo flute (1979)
- Streaming for solo flute (1979)
- The Watts Towers for solo percussionist (1981)
- Weft for six percussionists (1982)
- Trace for solo flute and ten accompanying players (1983)
- Solar One for flute and trumpet (1985)
- Lightfall, Twenty-Seven Lines, & Last Gleaming for solo percussionist (1989)
- Usuyuki for seven players and electronic sounds (1994)
- Ellipse for cello and electronic sounds (1999)
- Seasons for alto flute and electronic sounds (2004)
- Elementary Particles for two violins (2010-2012)
- Diverse Texts for soprano and violin (2011)
- There Are Blossoms for solo violin (2014)
- In die Regionen der Eisgebirge for two guitars (2016)
- Things Reverberate All Around for flute quartet (2016)
