= Harald Neuwirth =

Austrian pianist and composer (1939–2023)

Harald 'Harry' Neuwirth (2 February 1939 – 23 March 2023) was an Austrian jazz pianist and composer.

== Life and career ==
Born in Vienna, Neuwirth came from a musical family; the composer Gösta Neuwirth is his brother, the composer Olga Neuwirth his daughter. At the age of twelve he was already performing piano concertos by Mozart; he remained faithful to classical music until the age of 18, when he turned to jazz and became a jazz pianist. He initially studied law (until graduation). He also studied classical piano at the Salzburg Mozarteum and the Graz Conservatory.

Since its foundation in 1965, Neuwirth taught at the Institute for Jazz at the then University of Music and Performing Arts Graz, (now University of Music), where he was department head from 1975 to 1983. He is regarded as the "architect" of the Graz jazz education. In 1981 he was appointed full professor. He was a founding member of the sextet of Erich Kleinschuster, led his own ensembles and composed or arranged film and theatre music.

== Discography ==
- Grazer Messen im Jazzstil (1980)
- Jazz Piano Austria vol. 1 (2013, with Martin Reiter, Erwin Schmidt, Oliver Kent, Gerald Schuller, Sava Miletic and Philippine Duchateau)
