= Thomas Larcher =

Austrian composer and pianist

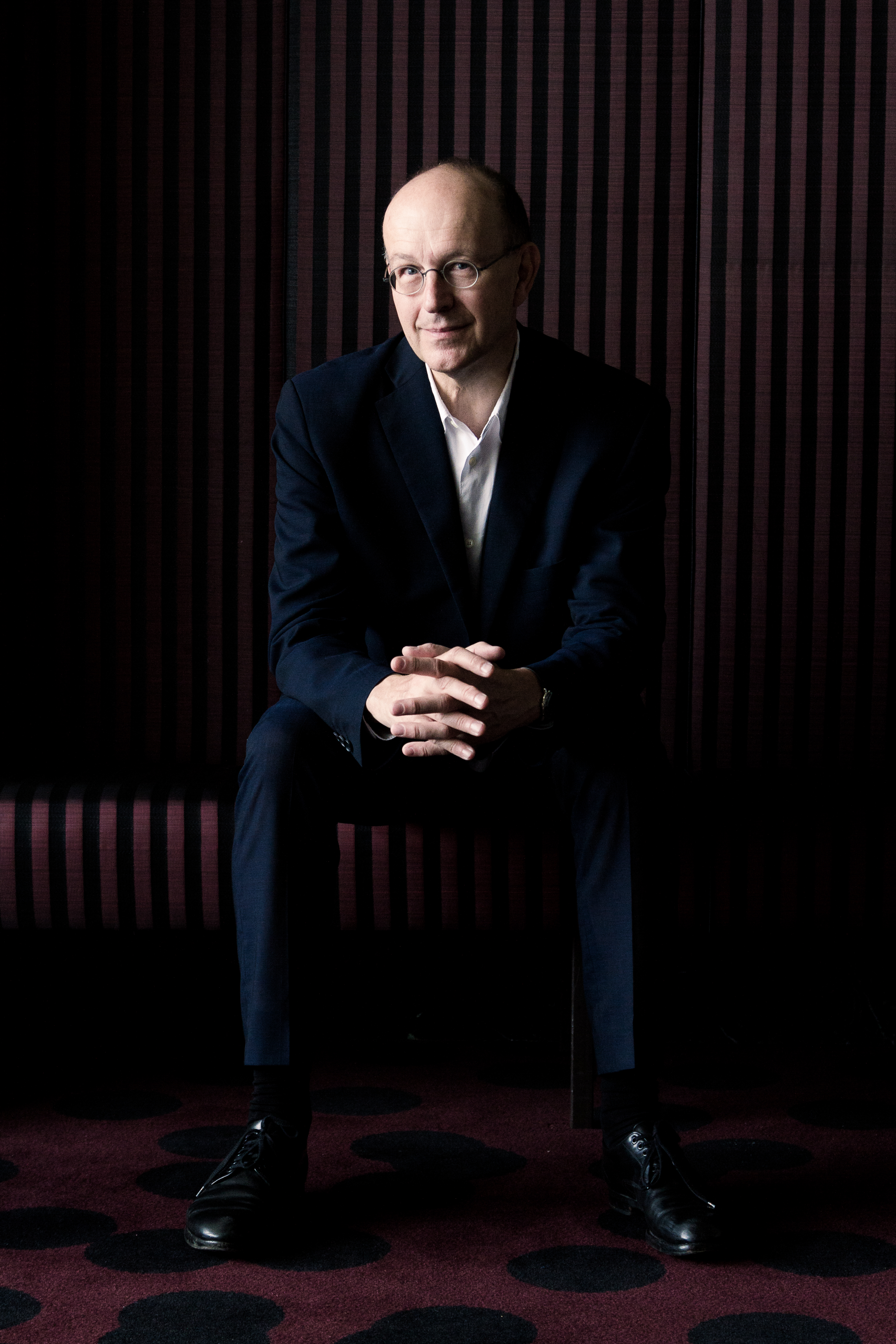
Composer Thomas Larcher

Thomas Larcher (born 16 September 1963, in Innsbruck) is an Austrian composer and pianist.

== Biography and Work ==
Thomas Larcher completed his studies at the University of Music and Performing Arts, Vienna under Heinz Medjimorec and Elisabeth Leonskaja (piano), and Erich Urbanner (composition). He became well known as a pianist whilst at university, focusing particularly in the area of contemporary music.

Larcher has performed under conductors such as Claudio Abbado, Pierre Boulez, Dennis Russell Davies and Franz Welser-Möst, and worked closely with composers such as Heinz Holliger, Olga Neuwirth and Isabel Mundry. He is also active in the sphere of music festivals: he founded the Klangspuren festival (which he ran from 1993 to 2004) and the chamber music festival Musik im Riesen (which he ran from 2004 to 2022) in Swarovski Kristallwelten Wattens. Since 2023 he is artistic leader of the chamber music festival listening closely.

For some years now, Larcher has dedicated himself primarily to composing and is today considered one of the leading composers of contemporary classical music in Austria. His early works (including “Naunz” and “Kraken”) are scored almost exclusively for piano and chamber orchestra. In recent years, his oeuvre has also encompassed, alongside chamber music (String Quartets 2 and 3, “My Illness is the Medicine I Need”), more compositions for orchestra and ensemble, as well as works for soloist and orchestra (e.g. “Böse Zellen”, “Die Nacht der Verlorenen”).

Larcher has been composer in residence at Aldeburgh Festival, Concertgebouw Amsterdam, Elbphilharmonie Hamburg, Wigmore Hall and Musikdorf Ernen in Switzerland. He has written numerous compositions for internationally renowned soloists and ensembles such as the London Sinfonietta, the Artemis Quartet, Heinrich Schiff, Matthias Goerne, Till Fellner, the Vienna Radio Symphony Orchestra and the San Francisco Symphony Orchestra. He has been commissioned by the Lucerne Festival, London’s Southbank Centre and Wigmore Hall, and the Zaterdagmatinee in Amsterdam.

Music by Thomas Larcher was used for the ballet “Kaspar Hauser” by Tim Plegge and for “Die Liebe kann tanzen” by Stephan Toss.

Thomas Larcher is a member of the Austrian Art Senate (Österreichischer Kunstsenat) and the Bavarian Academy of Fine Arts.

== Awards ==
- Choc du Monde de la Musique
- Preis der deutschen Schallplattenkritik (German Record Critics Award), Quarterly Critics’ Choice 4/2006 and 1/2024
- Editor’s Choice (Gramophone (magazine))
- British Composer Award (International Category) for Concerto for Violin, Cello and Orchestra (2012)
- Stoeger Prize of the New York Chamber Music Society (2014)
- Austrian Art Prize (2015)
- Ernst Krenek Prize of the City of Vienna (2018)
- Prix de Composition Musicale of Prince Pierre Foundation de Monaco for symphony No 2 "Kenotaph" (2018)
- Großer Österreichischer Staatspreis (Grand Austrian State Prize) (2019)
- Art Prize of the State of Tyrol (2021)

== Selected works ==
Larcher's works are published by Schott Music.

Opera

- The Hunting Gun, opera in three acts, libretto by Friederike Gösweiner after a short novel by Yasushi Inoue (Premiere: Bregenzer Festspiele 15 August 2018) (2015–2018)

Orchestral works

- Red and Green for large orchestra (2010)
- Symphony No. 2 Kenotaph (2015–2016)
- Chiasma for orchestra (2017)
- Symphony No. 3 A Line Above the Sky (2020), world premiere: Brno Philharmonic, conductor Dennis Russell Davies.
- Love and the Fever. Eight poems by Miyazawa Kenji for choir and orchestra translated by Roger Pulvers (2022–2023)

Orchestral works with solo instrument

- Still for viola and chamber orchestra (2002, revised 2004)
- Heute (Today) for soprano and orchestra (2005–06)
- Böse Zellen for piano and orchestra (2006, revised 2007)
- Concerto for violin and orchestra (2008–2009)
- Concerto for violin, cello and orchestra (2011)
- A Padmore Cycle for tenor and orchestra (2010–2011; 2014)
- Alle Tage Symphony No 1 for baritone and orchestra (2010–2015)
- Ouroboros for violoncello and orchestra (2015)
- Concerto for piano and orchestra (2020–2021)

Ensemble works

- Nocturne – Insomnia (2008)
- Die Nacht der Verlorenen (The Night of the Lost) for baritone and ensemble (2008)
- Wie der Euro nach Bern kam und wie er wieder verschwand (How the Euro came to Bern, and how he disappeared again) for ensemble (2012)
- My Illness Is the Medicine I Need for soprano and ensemble (2002/13, expanded version of My Illness Is the Medicine I Need for soprano, violine, violoncello and piano)
- The Living Mountain for soprano and ensemble (2019–2020) – text by Nan Shepherd; in cooperation with photographer Awoiska van der Molen

Chamber music

- Cold Farmer, String Quartet No. 1 (1990)
- Kraken for violin, cello and piano (1994–1997)
- Mumien (Mummies) for cello and piano (2001)
- My Illness Is the Medicine I Need for soprano, violin, cello and piano (2002)
- Uchafu for trumpet and piano (2003)
- IXXU, String Quartet No. 2 (1998–2004)
- Madhares, String Quartet No. 3 (2006–2007)
- A Padmore Cycle for tenor and piano (2010–2011)
- Splinters for violoncello and piano (2012)
- Lyrical Lights for tenor and clarinet (2013)
- lucid dreams, String Quartet No. 4 (2015)
- A Padmore Cycle for tenor and piano trio (2010–2011, 2017; enlarged version of A Padmore Cycle for tenor and piano)
- deep red / deep blue for flute and piano (2018)
- Encapsulations for string quartet (2024–2026)

Piano

- Klavierstück 1986 (Piano Piece 1986)
- Naunz (1989)
- Noodivihik (1992)
- Antennen-Requiem für H. (Antennae Requiem for H.) (1999)
- Smart Dust (2005)
- What Becomes/Was wird (2009)
- Poems, 12 pieces for pianists and other children (2010)
- Innerberger Bauerntanz for piano (2012)
- Movement for solo piano (2019)

Violoncello

- Vier Seiten for cello (1997)
- Sonata for violoncello (2007)

Vocal

- Das Spiel ist aus for 24-part choir (2012)

== Selected discography ==
CDs with music by Thomas Larcher

- Naunz (ECM, 2001)
- IXXU (ECM, 2006)
- Madhares (ECM, 2010)
- What Becomes (harmonia mundi, 2014)
- Symphony No. 2, Kenotaph (Ondine, 2021)
- Alle Tage/violin concerto (Tonkunstler, 2021)
- The Living Mountain (ECM, 2023)

CDs with Thomas Larcher as interpreter

- Arnold Schoenberg, Franz Schubert: Piano Pieces/Klavierstücke (ECM, 1999)
- Hanns Eisler: Ernste Gesänge – Lieder with piano (Thomas Larcher with Matthias Goerne, Ensemble Resonanz) (harmonia mundi, 2013)
