= Andrew Watts (countertenor) =

British classical countertenor (born 1967)

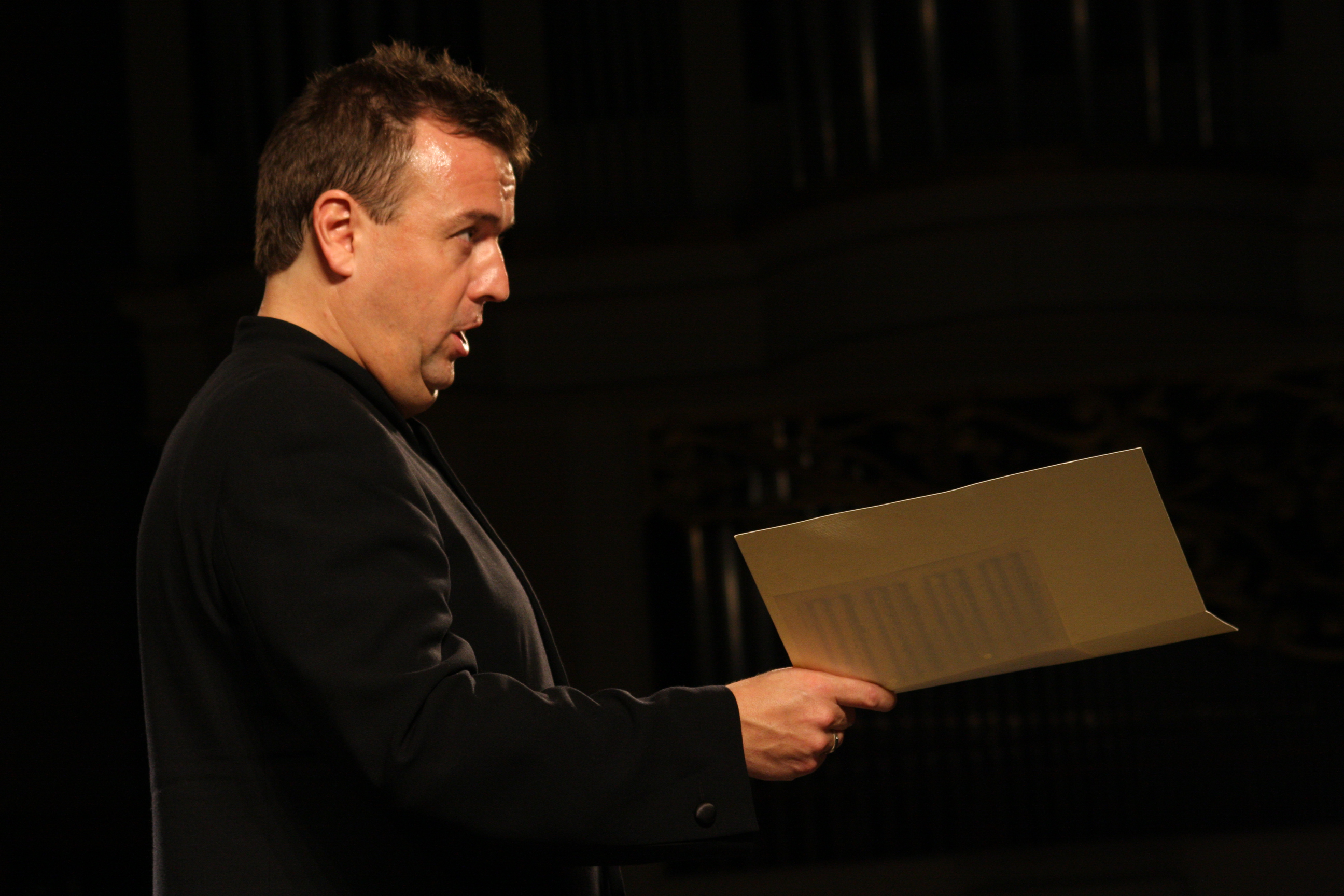
Andrew Watts

Andrew Watts (born 29 December 1967) is a British classical countertenor.

== Education and background ==
Andrew Watts was born in Hammersmith, Middlesex. He moved to Iver in Berkshire with his family in his early years and was educated at Slough Grammar school. He studied clarinet, piano and voice and at 16 he started studying both voice and clarinet at the Royal Academy of Music's junior school. He enrolled as a full-time student at the Royal Academy at 18 where he trained in singing and was awarded his DipRAM (later appointed ARAM) and his Licentiate. He was elected a fellow of the Guildhall School of Music and Drama in 2010 where he currently teaches singing. He currently is also a vocal coach to the Jette Parker young artists at the Royal Opera House, Covent Garden and gives vocal masterclasses regularly both in the UK and abroad including regularly teaching at the Hamburg Staatsoper and Dartington International Summer School. He was trained by a number of individuals over the years but received most of his training from Geoffrey Mitchell, David Pollard and Russell Smythe.

== Performance and career ==
Watts has sung every genre of contemporary and classical music on the operatic stage and in concert and has become one of the most respected countertenor singers in contemporary and new music and in 2016 was shortlisted for the Royal Philharmonic Society awards in the Singer category. Over his career he has fostered numerous close relationships with living composers and has inspired numerous new works for the countertenor voice. Noteworthy operas with parts written specifically for Watts include The Navigator (Liza Lim), Duchess of Malfi (Torsten Rasch), Alice in Wonderland (Unsuk Chin), Between Worlds (Tansy Davies), The Minotaur and Gawain (Harrison Birtwistle), Homage to Klaus Nomi and The Outcast, Lost Highway, Bählamms Fest (Olga Neuwirth). In addition, numerous songs have also been written for Andrew and are to be compiled in an upcoming album The Countertenor Songbook.

Watts' operatic engagements to date include appearances with the Royal Opera House Covent Garden, English National Opera, Glyndebourne Festival and Touring Operas, the Aldeburgh and Almeida Festivals and BBC Proms. Foreign engagements include Staatsoper Berlin, Komische Oper Berlin, Hamburgische Staatsoper, Bayerische Staatsoper, Nationaltheater Mannheim, RIAS Kammerchor Berlin, Theater an der Wien, La Scala Milan, Teatro La Fenice, Opéra National du Rhin, Opera de Lyon, Teatro Real Madrid, Teatro Sao Carlos Lisbon, Grand Theatre de Genève, De Vlaamse Opera, Graz Opera, Stadttheater Klagenfurt, Bielefeld and Australia, Canada and Mexico and the Salzburg, Vienna, Dresden, Bregenz, Batignano and Montepulciano Festivals. His repertoire includes Gluck's Orfeo ed Euridice, Arsamenes in Serse, title role in Orlando, Athamas in Semele, Andronico in Tamerlano, title role in Leonardo Vinci's Artaserse, Sorceress and Second Witch in Dido and Aeneas, Grace in Venus and Adonis, Ottone in Agrippina, Nero and Nitric in L'incoronazione di Poppea, Oberon in A Midsummer Night's Dream, Orlofsky in Die Fledermaus, Orestes in La belle Hélène, Edgar in Lear, Behemoth der Kater in Der Meister und Margarita, Adschib in Henze's L'Upupa und der Triumph der Sohnesliebe, Omar in The Death of Klinghoffer, Bishop Baldwin in Gawain, Prince Go-Go in Le Grand Macabre, Vyasemskaya / Pleasant Voice / Proletarian in A Dog's Heart and Pleasure in Gerald Barry's Triumph of Beauty. He has taken part in many world premieres including Olga Neuwirth's Bählamms Fest and Lost Highway, James in Harrison Birtwistle's The Last Supper and Snake Priestess The Minotaur, White Rabbit and March Hare in Unsuk Chin's Alice in Wonderland, Nuñez' Märchen, Liza Lim's The Navigator, Ian McQueen's Line of Terror, Guarnieri's Medea, Loat Objects for Bang on a Can, Dmitri Smirnov's The Lamentations of Thel, Raymond Yiu's The Original Chinese Conjuror and Symphony, Camille in Michael Finnissy's Thérèse Raquin, Judith Weir's Miss Fortune and The Outcast, Ferdinand in Torsten Rasch's The Duchess of Malfi and Shaman in Tansy Davies' Between Worlds.

Watts' concert engagements include appearances with BBC Symphony Orchestra, London Sinfonietta, Royal Scottish National Orchestra, Ulster Orchestra, Los Angeles and Cleveland Philharmonic Orchestras, Nieuw Ensemble, Klangforum Wien, at the BBC Proms and Salzburg, Lucerne, Lausanne, Cernier, Brighton and Edinburgh Festivals, Vienna, New York, Budapest, Seville, Paris, Cologne, Brussels, France, Australia and Italy. Repertoire includes Judas Maccabaeus, Jephtha, Solomon, Messiah, St John Passion, Bach Magnificat, The Indian Queen, Charpentier Te Deum the world premieres of Unsuk Chin's Cantatrix Sopranica, Birtwistle's Orpheus Elegies, Angel Fighter and The Shadow of Night, Oscar Strasnoy's L'instant, works by Guarnieri and Manzoni and Olga Neuwirth's, Homage a Klaus Nomi, La vie…Ulcerante and Five Daily Miniatures. He features on recordings for ASV of Boyce's Ode for St Cecilia's Day and David's Lamentation over Saul and Jonatan with the Hanover Band and was heard in Sally Potter's film Orlando. He broadcasts regularly and television appearances include a cameo as Kathleen Ferrier in William and Mary.

Engagements in 2016 include Cherubino in the world premiere of Divorced by Elena Langer for Welsh National Opera, his debut at the Paris Opera as Edgar in the new production of LEAR and concerts at Lucerne Festival and the BBC Proms. Future performances include debuts for Dutch National Opera, Amsterdam, Aix-en-Provence Festival, Badisches Staatstheater and Vienna Staatsoper, returns to Royal Opera House, Covent Garden, Opera de Lyon and Teatro Real, Madrid and concerts with BBCSO and Munich Philharmonic Orchestra.

== Recordings ==
- Boyce, David’s Lamentation over Saul and Jonatan – ASV/Gaudemus
- Boyce Ode for St Cecilia's Day – ASV/Gaudeamus
- The NMC Songbook – NMC Records
- Harrison Birtwistle, Angel Fighter – NMC Records
- Olga Neuwirth, Lost Highway – Kairos Records
- Harrison Birtwistle, Orpheus Elegies – Oboe Classics
