= Adriana Hölszky =

Romanian-born German musician and educator

Adriana Hölszky (born 30 June 1953) is a Romanian-born German music educator, composer and pianist who has been living in Germany since 1976.

== Biography ==
Hölszky was born in Bucharest. In the years 1959–1969 she studied piano with Olga Rosca-Berdan at the music school in Bucharest. In 1972, she began to study composition with Ştefan Niculescu as parallel to piano studies at the Bucharest Music Conservatory. In 1976 she moved with her family to Germany. Here she continued her studies, and in 1977–1980 she studied composition at the Musikhochschule in Stuttgart with Milko Kelemen, and chamber music with Günter Louegk. During her studies she performed as a pianist of the Trio Lipatti, together with her twin sister, violinist Monika Hölszky-Wiedemann and cellist Hertha Rosa-Herseni.

In 1977 and 1978, she participated in the International Mozarteum Summer Academy, and in 1978–1984 regularly in the Darmstadt Summer Courses for New Music. In 1980 she received a teaching position at the State University of Music and Performing Arts Stuttgart, and in 1983 a grant from the Arts Foundation of Baden-Württemberg. In 1986 she took first place at the Composers' Forum of the Darmstadt Summer Courses for New Music. In 1987 she received a scholarship from the Ministry of Culture of Lower Saxony. In 1992 she took composition seminars in Tokyo and Kyoto, and at the IRCAM in Paris. Her increasing international popularity was shown by three concerts she performed in Athens, Thessaloniki and Boston in 1993.

Between 1997 and 2000, Hölszky was professor of composition at the Rostock University of Music and Theatre, and since 2000 she has been professor of composition at the Mozarteum University of Salzburg. Since 2002 she has been a member of the Academy of Fine Arts in Berlin.

== Awards ==
- 1978 Prize of the International Chamber Music Competition in Florence
- 1979 1st Prize of the Valentino Bucchi Composition Competition in Rome
- 1980 Prize of the International Chamber Music Competition in Colmar France)
- 1981 Gaudeamus Prize, Bilthoven (Netherlands)
- 1982 Max Deutsch Paris Prize, Prize of the City of Stuttgart, Composition Prize of the East German Cultural Foundation
- 1985 1st Prize EnsembliaComposition Competition, Monchengladbach
- 1985 Johann Wenzel Stamitz Prize, Mannheim GEDOK Price
- 1988 Prize of the City of Stuttgart
- 1989 1st Prize at GEDOK International Composition Competition
- 1990 Schneider-Schott Music Prize
- 1991 Rome Prize of the Villa Massimo
- 2003 Bach Prize of the Free and Hanseatic City of Hamburg
- 2024 Robert Schumann Prize for Poetry and Music

== Works ==
=== Stage works ===
Premiere	Title	Description	Libretto and source
04 Jun 1988, Munich Biennale	Bremer Freiheit	Singwerk auf ein Frauenleben	Thomas Körner, after the play by Rainer Werner Fassbinder
20 May 1995, Theater an der Wien/ Wiener Festwochen	Die Wände	Musiktheater in 3 acts, 90'	Thomas Körner, after the play Les Paravents by Jean Genet
29 May 1997, Kunst- und Ausstellungshalle der Bundesrepublik Deutschland, Bonn	Tragoedia (Der unsichtbare Raum)	Work with theatrical spaces, for orchestra and tape, 60'	Thomas Körner (the libretto was used to provide the lengths of each segment of the work, the text itself is not used)
26 Sep 1997, Bühnen Graz/ steirischer herbst	Der Aufstieg der Titanic	opeRatte for six singers, sound effects and tape	
19 May 2004, Schwetzingen Festival	Der gute Gott von Manhattan	Musiktheater	Yona Kim, after the radio play of Ingeborg Bachmann
17 Nov 2000, Stuttgart State Opera	Giuseppe e Sylvia	Musiktheater in 3 acts, 90'	Hans Neuenfels
25 Apr 2008, Rokokotheater, Schwetzingen Festival	Hybris/Niobe	Drama for voices	Yona Kim, after the opera Niobe by Agostino Steffani, themes by Ovid, Shakespeare, The Bible and texts from Landplagen by Jakob Michael Reinhold Lenz

=== Other works ===
- Piano Sonata, 1975
- String Quartet, 1975
- Constellation for orchestra, 1975–76
- Monologue for female voice and drums, 1977
- ... There were black birds for five female voices and percussion, 1978
- Il était un homme rouge for 12 voices, 1978
- Comment for Lauren for soprano, 8 brass and timpani, 1978
- Space for four orchestral groups, 1979–80
- Omnion for tape, 1980
- Questions I, for soprano, baritone, violin, cello and piano, 1980
- Questions II for soprano, baritone, violin, cello, flute, piccolo, guitar and piano, 1981
- Flux re-flux for alto saxophone, 1981–83
- Inner Worlds I for String Trio, 1981
- Inner Worlds II for String Quartet, 1981–82
- Arcades for two flutes and string quartet, 1982
- Inlay I for flute, violin and piano, 1982
- Decorum for harpsichord, 1982–83
- Inlay II for flute, violin, harpsichord and piano, 1982–83
- Inlay III for flute, violin, two pianos, 1982–83
- Controversia for two flutes, two oboes and violin, 1983
- Erewhon for 14 instruments, 1984
- Sound projector for 12 strings, 1984–85
- New Erewhon for ensemble, 1984–85/90
- Props for nine instruments, 1985
- ... And again darkness I für Pauken and piano, 1985/90
- ... And again darkness II for timpani and organ, 1986
- Always silent for four choruses, 1986
- Hörfenster for Franz Liszt for piano, 1986–87
- Fragments from 'Bremer Freiheit' for accordion, and drums cymbalon, 1988
- Suspension bridges – String Quartet 'to Schubert', two string quartets, octets may be played simultaneously, 1989–90
- Hunting wolves back for six timpani, 1989–90
- Caravan – reflection on the sound of walking for 12 timpani, 1989–90
- Flutes of the light, 'game face' for female voice, five horns and other instruments ad lib., 1989–90
- Message (E. Ionesco), for mezzo-soprano, baritone, narrator and electronics, 1990
- Light Aircraft for violin, flute and orchestra, 1990
- Segments I (for seven centers of sound) for piccolo flute, euphonium, double bass, piano, cymbalom, accordion and percussion, 1991–92
- Segments II for piano and percussion, 1992
- Segments III for oboe, double bass and accordion, 1992
- Miserere for accordion, 1992
- A honeycomb sound for violin, 1993
- World ends for 4 Brass, 1993
- A due – wave study for 2 clarinets, 1993
- Painting of a slain (JMR Lenz) for 72 voices, 1993
- On the night for the orchestra, 1994/2001
- Cargo for Orchestra, 1995
- Arena for Orchestra, 1995
- Qui audit me for alto flute, viola, guitar and speaker (ad lib.), 1996
- Clouds and moon for accordion and cello, 1996/2006
- Avance Impulsion mécaniques for clarinet, euphonium, cello and piano, 1997
- And I looked like a sea of glass mixed with fire ... for organ, 1997
- Spin 2 for violin and keyboard, 1998
- High Way for accordion and 19 Instruments, 1998–99
- Gamut of myths, for six percussionists, string orchestra, 1999
- High Way for accordion and ensemble, 1999/2003
- On the other side for 3 soloists and orchestra, 2000
- High Way for One for Accordion, 2000
- Dream song for percussion, 2000
- Mask and color for baritone (mezzo-soprano) and piano, 2000, text: Michael Krüger
- Umsphinxt ... A puzzle for birds of prey, text by Friedrich Nietzsche's "The desert grows' for 48stg choir, 2000–01
- On the other side for clarinet, harp, accordion and orchestra, 2000–03
- On behalf of all the light '(second part) for choir and organ, 2004
- Lemurs and ghosts for soprano, flute, clarinet, violin, cello and piano, 2004–05
- Like a bird Hommage à György Kurtág for Violin, 2006
- Maneuvers for two clarinets and orchestra, 2006
- Demons for chorus and orchestra, 2006
- Snowbirds (like a bird II) Hommage à György Kurtág for violin and piano, 2006
- Countdown for Counter Tenor and Orchestra, 2007. Text: Ver du Bois
- Grid for bassoon, 2008
- The dogs of Orion for 8 voices, 2010
- Apeiron for violin and string orchestra, 2018
