= Pēteris Vasks =

Latvian composer (born 1946)

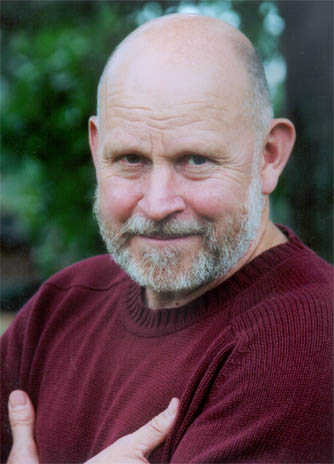
- Vasks in 2007

Background information
- Born: 16 April 1946 (age 80)
- Origin: Aizpute, Latvia
- Genres: Classical music
- Occupations: composer, double bassist
- Years active: 1970s–

Pēteris Vasks (born 16 April 1946) is a Latvian composer.

== Biography ==
Vasks was born in Aizpute, Latvia, into the family of a Baptist pastor. He trained as a violinist at the Jāzeps Vītols Latvian Academy of Music, as a double-bass player with Vitautas Sereikaan at the Lithuanian Academy of Music and Theatre, and played in several Latvian orchestras before entering the State Conservatory in Vilnius in the neighboring Lithuania to study composition with Valentin Utkin, as he was prevented from doing this in Latvia due to Soviet repressive policy toward Baptists. He started to become known outside Latvia in the 1990s, when Gidon Kremer started championing his works, and he now is one of the most influential and praised European contemporary composers.

Vasks' early style owed much to the aleatoric experiments of Witold Lutosławski, Krzysztof Penderecki and George Crumb. Later works included elements of Latvian folk music, such as his gentle and pastoral cor anglais concerto (1989). His works are generally extremely clear and communicative, with a solid and muscular sense of harmony. Lyrical passages may be followed by agitated dissonances, or interrupted by sombre sections with a march-like feel. He made extensive use of minimalist techniques as well, but never became attached to any particular method.

Vasks feels strongly about environmental issues, and a sense of nature both pristine and destroyed can be found in many of his works, such as the String Quartet No. 2 (1984). Other important works include Cantabile (1979) and Musica dolorosa (1984) and "Bass Trip" (2003) for solo double bass. He has written six string quartets, the fourth (1999) and fifth (2004) of which were written for the Kronos Quartet.

Vasks was the recipient of the Vienna Herder Prize of the Alfred Toepfer Foundation in 1996, as well as the Baltic Assembly Prize for Literature, the Arts and Science, and the Latvian Grand Music Award in 1997, the latter for his first violin concerto Tālā gaismā ("Distant Light") (1996–97). He received the Cannes Classical Awards in 2004. His important works also include "Viatore", Symphony No. 2 and "Music for a deceased Friend".

Since 1994, he has been an honorary member of the Latvian Academy of Sciences and in 2001 he became a member of the Royal Swedish Academy of Music. In 1996, he was the main composer at the Stockholm New Music Festival and in 2006 composer-in-residence at the Presteigne Festival of Music and the Arts and the Vale of Glamorgan Festival in Wales.

In 2005, he received the Estonian honour the Order of the White Star, 3rd Class. Vasks was awarded the 2026 Robert Schumann Prize for Poetry and Music.

== Works ==
The following is a list of works by Vasks:

=== Symphonies ===
- Symphony No. 1: Balsis ("Voices") (1991), for string orchestra
- Symphony No. 2 (1998)
- Symphony No. 3 (2005)

=== Other orchestral works ===
- Cantabile per archi (1979), for string orchestra
- Vēstījums ("The Message") (1982), for orchestra with percussion and two pianos
- Musica dolorosa (1983), for string orchestra
- Lauda (1986), for orchestra
- Musica adventus (1996), for string orchestra
- Adagio (1996), for string orchestra
- Viatore (2001), for string orchestra (also for organ (2001))
- Musica appassionata (2002), for string orchestra
- Symphonic elegy Sala ("Island") (2006), for orchestra
- Credo (2009), for orchestra
- Epifānija ("Epiphany") (2010), for string orchestra
- Musica serena (2015), for string orchestra

=== Orchestra with instrumental soloists ===
- Violin Concerto No. 1 Tālā gaismā ("Distant Light") (1997), for violin and strings
- Violin Concerto No. 2 Vakara gaismā ("Evening Light") (2020), for violin and strings
- Viola Concerto (2015), for viola and strings
- Cello Concerto No. 1 (1994)
- Cello Concerto No. 2 Klātbūtne ("Presence") (2012), for cello and strings
- Flute Concerto (2008)
- Oboe Concerto (2018)
- Concerto for cor anglais and orchestra (1989)
- Meditation Vientuļais eņģelis ("Lonely Angel") (1999), for violin and strings
- Fantasia Vox Amoris (2009), for violin and strings

=== Chamber music ===
- Vasaras dejas ("Summer dances") (2017), for two violins
- Castillo Interior (2013), for violin and cello; (2023), for solo piano
- Mazā vasaras mūzika ("Little Summer Music") (1985), for violin and piano; (2012), for viola and piano
- Partita (1974), for cello and piano
- Three compositions (1973), for clarinet and piano
- Musique du soir/Vakara mūzika ("Evening Music") (1988/1989), for horn and organ
- Music for two pianos (1974)
- In Memoriam (1977), for two pianos
- Toccata (1977), for two pianos
- Concerto for timpani and percussion (1979)
- Trīs skatieni/Trīsvienība ("Three glances"/"Trinity") (1979), for violin, cello, and piano
- Episodi e canto perpetuo (1985), for violin, cello, and piano
- Pianotrio Plainscapes (2011), for violin, cello, and piano
- Piano Quartet (2001), for piano, viola, cello, and piano
- String Quartet No. 1 (1977)
- String Quartet No. 2 Vasaras dziedājumi ("Summer tunes") (1984)
- String Quartet No. 3 Ziemassvētku kvartets ("Christmas Quartet") (1995)
- String Quartet No. 4 (2000)
- String Quartet No. 5 (2004)
- String Quartet No. 6 (2020)
- Mūzika aizlidojošajiem putniem ("Music for flying birds") (1977), for wind quintet
- Mūzika aizgājušam draugam ("Music for a late friend") (1982), for wind quintet
- Chamber Music (1975), for flute, oboe, clarinet, bassoon, and percussion
- Pavasara sonāte ("Spring Sonata") (1987), for string sextet
- Canto di forza (2005), for twelve cellos (also for organ (2006))

=== Solo instrumental ===
- Cycle (1976), for piano
- Moments musicaux (1977), for clarinet
- Grāmata čellam ("A book for cello") (1978), for cello
- Eine kleine Nachtmusik ("A Little Night Music") (1978), for piano
- Ainava ar putniem ("Landscape with birds") (1980), for flute
- Cantata (1980), for harpsichord
- Baltā ainava ("White landscape") (1980), for piano
- Rudens mūzika ("Autumn Music") (1981), for piano
- Pieskārieni ("Touches") (1982), for oboe
- Cantus ad pacem (Concerto per organo) (1984), for organ
- Sonata (1986), for double bass
- Musica sera per organo (1988), for organ
- Sonata Vientulība ("Loneliness") (1990), for guitar
- Te Deum (1991), for organ
- Sonata (1992), for flute
- Izdegušās zemes ainavas ("Landscapes of the burnt-out earth") (1992), fantasy for piano
- Pavasara mūzika (Quasi una sonata) ("Spring Music (Quasi una sonata)") (1995), for piano
- Viatore (2001), for organ (also for string orchestra (2001))
- Bass Trip (2003), for double bass
- Canto di forza (2006), for organ (also for twelve cellos (2005))
- Zaļā ainava ("Green landscape") (2008), for piano
- Vasaras vakara mūzika ("Music for a summer evening") (2009), for piano
- Latviešu deja ("Latvian Dance") (2012), for piano
- Hymnus (2018), for organ
- Dzeguzes balss. Pavasara elēģija ("Cuckoo's Voice. Spring Elegy") (2021), for piano
- Sonata Estiva (2022), for violin

=== Choral ===
Unaccompanied choir:

- Golgātas krusts ("Cross of Golgotha") (1967)
- Ugunssargs ("The Firefighter") (1975)
- Liepa ("The Lime-Tree") (1975/2012)
- Māte saule ("Mother Sun") (1975)
- Small concert for voices, conductor, and composer (1976)
- Ar laiku puķes vīst ("Flowers wither in time") (1976)
- Mūsu māšu vārdi ("Our mothers' names") (1977/2006)
- Ne tikai lirika ("Not just poetry") (1977)
- Baltais fragments ("White fragment") (1978)
- Vasara ("Summer") (1978)
- Concerto vocale (1978)
- Klusās dziesmas ("Silent Songs") (1979)
- Skumjā māte ("Sad Mother") (1980)
- Ganu dziesma ("Shepherd's Song") (1981)
- Zīles ziņa ("Message of a Chickadee") (1981)
- Ķekatu dziesma ("Carnival Song") (1981)
- Mazi silti svētki ("A Moment of Celebration") (1988)
- Mūsu dziesma ("Our Song") (1988)
- Zemgale (1989)
- Varonis ("Hero") (1989)
- Savā tautā ("By His People") (1990)
- Pater Noster (1991) (also for choir and string orchestra (2000))
- Litene (1993)
- Three poems (1995), for four soloists
- Balsis klusumā ("Voices in silence") (1997), for six solo voices and female choir
- Mass (2000) (also for choir and organ or string orchestra (2001/2005))
- Piedzimšana ("Birth") (2008)
- Mīlas dziesmas ("Love Songs") (2013)
- Klusuma auglis ("The Fruit of Silence") (2013) (also for choir and string orchestra (2014))
- Mūsu kalni ("Our Mountains") (2017)
- Tēvu zeme ("Fatherland") (2018)
- Cosa devo fare? ("What should I do?") (2018)

Accompanied choir:

- Lūgšana mātei ("Prayer for a mother") (1978), for soprano, choir, and orchestra
- Kantāte sievietēm ("Cantata for Women") (1978), for soprano, choir, and orchestra
- Three folk song settings (1984), for voices, flute, cello, and piano
- Chamber cantata Latvija (1987), for soprano, flute, bells, and piano
- Pater Noster (2000), for choir and string orchestra (also for unaccompanied choir (1991))
- Dona Nobis Pacem (1996), for choir and organ or string orchestra
- Mass (2001/2005), for choir and organ or string orchestra (also for unaccompanied choir (2000))
- Līdzenuma ainavas ("Plainscapes") (2002), for choir, violin, and cello
- Klusuma auglis ("The Fruit of Silence") (2014), for choir and string orchestra (also for unaccompanied choir (2013))
- Lūgšana Latvijai ("Prayer for Latvia") (2014), for choir and wind orchestra
- Da Pacem, Domine (2016), for choir and string orchestra
- Laudate Dominum (2016), for choir and orchestra
- Veni Domine (2018), for choir and organ
