= Kurt Barthel (writer) =

German writer, poet and playwright (1914-1967)

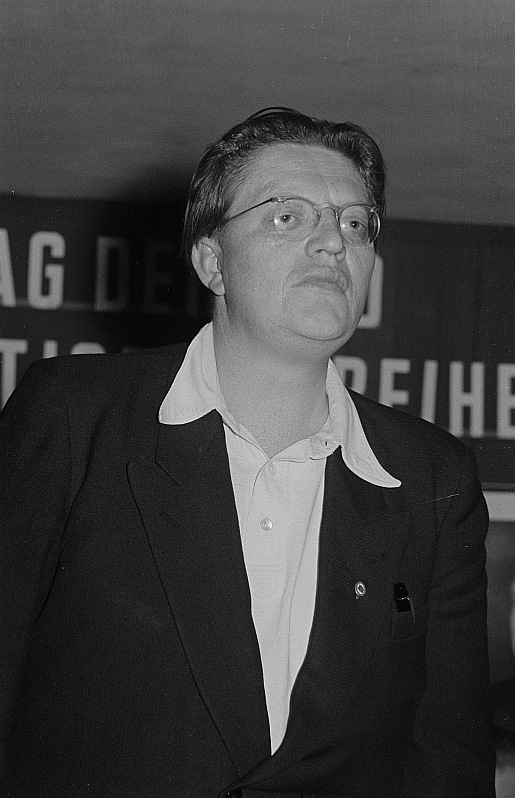
Barthel in 1954

Kurt Walter Barthel (June 8 1914, Garnsdorf – November 12 1967, Frankfurt am Main), known by his pen name KuBa, was a German writer, poet, playwright, dramaturge and state official.

== Biography ==
Barthel was born into the family of a railroad worker. His father was killed by an officer before he was born.

Barthel was active in the workers' movement from his teenage years and was a member of the Socialist Youth of Germany – Falcons. From 1928 to 1932 Barthel was trained as a decorative painter in Chemnitz. In 1933 he joined the Social Democratic Party of Germany.

The same year after the Nazi Party gained power, Barthel emigrated to Czechoslovakia and there he met Louis Fürnberg on whose suggestion he wrote his first poems and stories for Die Rote Fahne. It was also at this period where he started to use the pen name Kuba in order to distance himself from the Nazi-affiliated author Max Barthel. With Fürnberg he worked in the amateur theater group "The New Life". Politically, he was active in the youth work of the left Social Democrats and helped other emigrants to illegally cross the border. From 1937 he was editor of the Arbeiter-Illustrierte-Zeitung (AIZ) in Prague. In 1939 he fled further to Great Britain. There he earned his living as a farm and construction worker, wrote natural poems in English and became a member of the Free German Youth (FDJ).

In 1946, Barthel returned to Germany and joined the Socialist Unity Party. From 1946 to 1948 he worked as an editor at the party publishing house Dietz in East Berlin and from 1949 he switched exclusively to literary activity. Barthel soon became an exemplary party poet, composing hymns dedicated to the construction of socialism. Barthel gained fame as the author of a cantata in honor of Joseph Stalin.

He publicly expressed his attitude to the events of June 17, 1953, saying that he was ashamed of the immaturity of the workers for which he was harshly criticized by Bertolt Brecht – Brecht's satirical poem Die Lösung is a riposte to Barthel's claim that the population would need to work to re-earn trust. From 1952, Bartel switched to party work, in particular, he held the post of first secretary of the Deutscher Schriftstellerverband and was a member of the Central Committee of the SED. In 1953 he was appointed a member of Academy of Arts. From 1956 until his death, Kurt Bartel was the main playwright of the Rostock People's Theatre. From 1958, Bartel was a member of the Volkskammer.

During a tour of the Federal Republic of Germany in which 50 Rote Nelken was represented by the Rostock People's Theatre, on November 12, 1967, before 1,100 spectators in Frankfurt am Main, riots broke out by members of the Sozialistischer Deutscher Studentenbund (SDS), who expected a less moderate program; Barthel, who was ill with heart failure at the time, passed away in the ward and was buried in the New Cemetery in Rostock.

The Kurt Barthel Medal in the GDR was named after him, an award for those working in the field of culture.

== Awards ==
- In 1949 he was awarded the National Prize of the German Democratic Republic for his poem about people .
- In 1957 he received the Literature Prize of the Free German Trade Union Federation (FDGB) and the Erich Weinert Medal.
- In 1958 he received the National Prize of the German Democratic Republic for designing the festival program for the 40th anniversary of the October Revolution and the festival program for the Baltic Sea Week.
- In 1959 Barthel was awarded the National Prize of the German Democratic Republic (as a collective) for the Störtebeker ballad.

== Works ==
- Gedicht vom Menschen. 1948.
- Kantate auf Stalin. 1949.
- Gedanken im Fluge. 1950 (Reportagen über die Sowjetunion)
- Gedichte. Eine Auswahl. 1952.
- Osten erglüht. 1954 (Reportagen über die Volksrepublik China)
- Klaus Störtebeker. (Dramat. Ballade), 1959. Siehe Klaus Störtebeker : Dramat. Ballade in 6 Episoden, e. Vorspiel u. e. Nachspiel / Buch: Kuba. Dramat. Einrichtg: Hanns Anselm Perten. Musik Günter KochanGedichte. 1961.
- Brot und Wein. Gedichte, Lieder, Nachdichtungen. 1961.
- terra incognita. (Dramat. Poem), 1964.
- Marsch der Dynamosportler, Gedicht. 1983.
- Wort auf Wort wächst das Lied. Gedichte. 1970.
- Schlösser und Katen. 1970.
- Hexen. 1970.
- Vergeßt mir meine Traudel nicht. Filmerzählungen. 1974.
- Zack streitet sich mit der ganzen Welt. Erzählungen. 1982.

== Film adaptations ==
- The Benthin Family (co-author with Johannes R. Becher, Slatan Dudow, Ehm Welk and others on the script, directed by Slatan Dudow and Kurt Maetzig), 1950
- Hexen (screenplay for the film by Helmut Spieß), 1954
- Castles and Cottages (screenplay for the DEFA film by Kurt Maetzig), 1956/1957
- Don't Forget My Little Traudel (screenplay for the DEFA film by Kurt Maetzig), 1957
