= Karl Schiske =

Austrian composer

Karl Hubert Rudolf Schiske (12 February 1916 – 16 June 1969) was an Austrian composer and musical composition professor.

== Life ==
Schiske was born in Győr in what is now western Hungary which was then still part of the Danube Monarchy in 1916. In 1919 the family first moved to Orth an der Donau in Lower Austria and in 1923 to Vienna. He attended the grammar school in the Albertgasse, where he met his lifelong friend and later painter Carl Unger. From 1932 he received composition lessons from Ernst Kanitz, a pupil of Franz Schreker, and in 1939 he passed the final examination in composition at the Vienna University of Music as an external student. In addition, he studied musicology, art history, philosophy and physics at the University of Vienna and received his doctorate in 1942 on the use of dissonance in Bruckner's symphonies.

He received his training as a pianist with Roderich Bass and Julius Varga at the Neues Wiener Konservatorium and with Hans Weber at the Vienna Academy of Music.

While still a student, the city orchestra of the Wiener Symphoniker and the Steinbauer Quartet performed his early works in the Wiener Musikverein and the Wiener Konzerthaus from 1939 onwards.

In 1940 he was drafted into the Wehrmacht, during which time he was also able to compose.

Under the impression of the Second World War, his main work, the oratorio Vom Tode, was written, dedicated to his brother Hubert, who died near Riga in 1944. It was first performed in 1948 under Karl Böhm in the Vienna Konzerthaus.

After the end of the war he lived as a freelance composer in Vienna with longer stays in Upper Austria, Styria, Salzburg and Orth on the Danube. Schiske's patron and sponsor at that time was Rita Schuller of Götzburg from Großsölk/Styria, to whom Schiske dedicated a large number of compositions.

After the war, his most fruitful creative phase began, during which time he wrote his Symphonies No. 2 to 4, the Chamber Concerto for Orchestra and a large number of chamber music works, until 1952, when he received a call from the Vienna Academy of Music to teach composition. In the same year he was awarded the professional title Professor and the Austrian State Prize (for the oratorio Vom Tode) by the Federal President of Austria. Internationally, he appeared in 1957 as co-founder of a studio for electronic music and held guest professorships at the University of California, Riverside in 1966 and 1967. In 1962 he was finally appointed extraordinary university professor in Vienna. He was a member of the board of directors of the International Society for Contemporary Music Austria.

Among his students were Erich Urbanner, Iván Erőd, Gösta Neuwirth, Kurt Schwertsik, Otto M. Zykan, Charles Boone, Norma Wendelburg, Ramon Zupko, and Luca Lombardi.

Schiske was married to Berta Baumhackl since 1954 and had four children. He died on 16 June 1969 at the age of 53 from a brain haemorrhage and was buried at the local cemetery in Orth an der Donau.

== Work ==
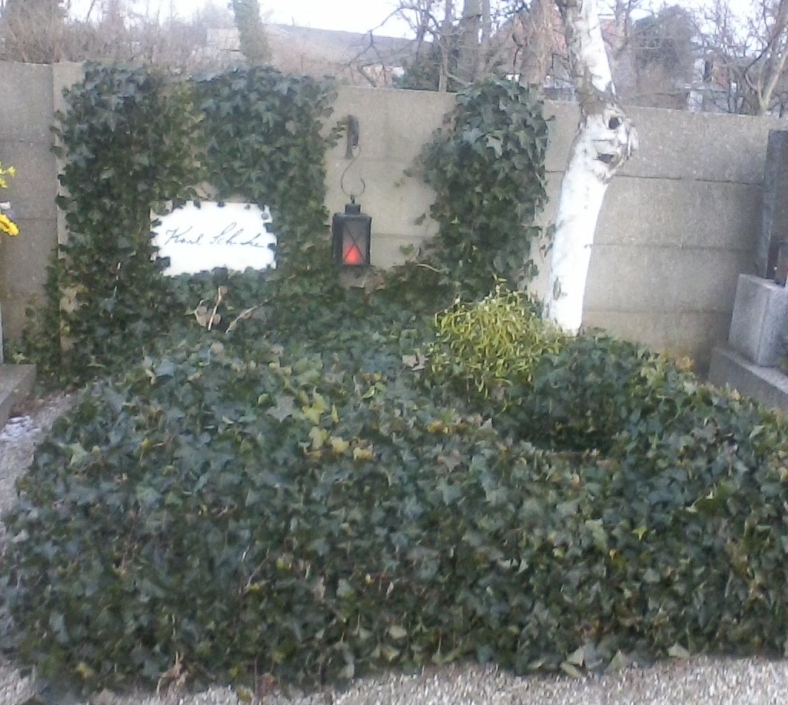
Grave of Karl Schiske

- Konzert für Klavier und Orchester, Op. 11
- Sonate für Violine und Klavier, Op. 18 (1943/48)
- Vom Tode, Oratorium, Op. 25
- Psalm 99, Op. 30

== Awards ==
- 1950: Preis der Stadt Wien für Musik
- 1952: Förderungspreis des Österreichischen Staatspreises für Musik
- 1960: Theodor Körner Prize
- 1960: Austrian Decoration for Science and Art
- 1967: Grand Austrian State Prize
- 1968: Decoration of Honour for Services to the Republic of Austria (1952)
- 1970: Landeskulturpreis des Landes Niederösterreich postum
