= Institute of Electronic Music and Acoustics =

Austrian research center

The Institute of Electronic Music and Acoustics (IEM) is a multidisciplinary research center within the University of Music and Performing Arts, Graz, (Austria).

== Research ==
=== Research and development ===
Research activities are concentrated mainly in digital signal processing, audio engineering, and psycho acoustics, e.g. projects in analysis and syntheses of sound and loudness perception.

- Recording- and Reproduction technology
- Signal Processing, Sound Analysis and Synthesis
- Realtime Software
- Internet Archive of Electronic Music

=== Artistic Research ===
The IEM is very active in the field of Artistic Research. As part of the 'Doctor Artium' program of the University of Music and Performing Arts Graz, several art-based doctorates have been supervised at the IEM. Also, since 2011 IEM staff members have won seven PEEK grands for various artistic research projects, each with a run-time of three years. The PEEK program is a highly competitive research program for artistic research in Austria, and is funded by the Austrian Science Fund (FWF).

== Education ==
At IEM, compositions students are trained in musical acoustics, sound synthesis, algorithmic composition, and real-time systems. The institute has established an audio engineering curriculum in collaboration with the Graz University of Technology. The most important aspects of these courses is to bring technology and artistic creativity closer together.

=== Composition - Computer Music ===
The IEM offers a 3-year bachelor and a 2-year master program in Computer Music. The main focuses of this three-year program – the first of its kind in Austria – are:

- Computer Music Composition
- Performance and interpretation of electronic works
- Conception and development of new electronic instruments
- Music Informatics

Some of the offered courses are taking place in collaboration with the Institute of Composition, Music Theory and Conducting (Institute 1) of the Graz University of Music and Dramatic Arts

=== Electrical Engineering / Sound Engineering ===
Bachelor/Master study in cooperation with the Graz University of Technology

=== Musicology ===
Bachelor/Master study in cooperation with the University of Graz

== Art Production ==
IEM provides technology and know-how to composers and musicians in the creation and realization of their works. Since 1990, IEM has collaborated with guest artists (including Olga Neuwirth, Peter Ablinger, Bernhard Lang) in the production and performance of more than 80 new compositions. In this process, many international partnerships have been established.

Since 2014 the IEM is also offering an Artist-In-Residence program, which enables the selected artist to work at the facilities of the IEM for a duration of 5 months. The selected Artists-In-Residence are:

- 2014: Dugal McKinnon
- 2015: Heather Frasch and Budhaditya Chattopadhyay
- 2016: Reiko Yamada

== Publications ==
The IEM publishes the series "Contributions to Electronic Music".

== Open source ==
The IEM is involved in several open-source projects. It is currently hosting the main community portal and the mailing-lists for Pure Data

== Articles ==
- Ritsch, Winfried and IOhannes Zmölnig. “IEM — Institute of Electronic Music and Acoustics (Graz).” eContact! 11.3 — Logiciels audio « open source » / Open Source for Audio Application (September 2009).
