= Hermann Wunsch =

German composer, conductor and music theorician

Hermann Wunsch (9 August 1884 – 21 December 1954) was a German composer, conductor, music theorist and lecturer in composition.

== Life and career ==
Born in Neuss, Wunsch was born in Neuss, Rhineland, in 1884, the son of the railway works master Balthasar Wunsch and his wife Amalie Hafels. He began his education with a teachers' seminar. He then attended conservatories in Krefeld, where he studied composition with Theodor Müller-Reuter, Düsseldorf, where he was taught by Frank Limbert, and Cologne.

Wunsch then settled in Krefeld. There he first worked for a year as an associate teacher at the conservatory. From 1907 to 1910 he conducted the local philharmonic choir and also worked as a private music teacher. He then took over the direction of the newly founded conservatoire in Viersen. From 1911 to 1912 Wunsch studied at the Berlin University of the Arts with Engelbert Humperdinck. He then spent a year as music director in Wattwil, Switzerland.

During the First World War Wunsch served on the Eastern Front. After the end of the war he lived in Berlin. From 1919 to 1920 he taught at the Klindworth-Scharwenka Conservatory. Afterwards he worked as a freelance composer. He was financially supported by Heinrich Schenker, who granted him a scholarship for destitute musicians from the Sofie-Deutsch-Fond in 1924. From 1930 to 1931 Wunsch served as choral director of the Stern Conservatory. In 1937 he began teaching composition at the Berlin Musikhochschule, from 1945 as professor.

Wunsch was married to Paula Augusta, née Peschken. The marriage produced a son, Hans Wolfgang Wunsch (* 1913).

Wunsch died in 1954 in Berlin at the age of 70. His grave is located at the Waldfriedhof Dahlem.

== Work ==
Among other works, Wunsch composed eight operas, a piano concerto, six symphonies, a mass and several orchestral works. In total, he created around 60 works of almost all musical genres. While his compositional output received relatively little recognition, he was highly regarded as a pedagogue and theorist.

Works

- Violinkonzert. einsätzig, premiere 1922 in Berlin.
- II. Sinfonie. Muich 1923.
- Liederbüchlein für Paula Wunsch: sechs kleine schlichte Weisen für eine Singstimme mit Klavierbegleitung. Op. 2. Drei Tannen-Verlag, Berlin 1924.
- III. Sinfonie. Trier 1925.
- IV. Sinfonie. Kassel 1927.
- Bianca. einaktiges Kammerspiel für Musik, Deutsches Nationaltheater und Staatskapelle Weimar 1927.
- Don Juans Sohn. Kammeroper, Deutsches Nationaltheater Weimar 1928.
- Aus dem Stundenbuch des Rainer Maria Rilke. (op. 18, 4 Lieder), Forberg, Leipzig 1924. Trier 1925.
- Kammerkonzert für Klavier und kleines Orchester: op. 22. Schott, Mainz 1925. Kiel 1925, Tonkünstlerfest.
- Chor der thebanischen Alten: op. 32. Gebr. Hug & Co, Leipzig 1930.
- with Kurt Heynicke (poem): Volk : für dreistimmigen Kinder- bezw. Frauenchor oder vierstimmigen gemischten Chor mit Begl. eines Klaviers oder eines Schülerorchesters; op. 34. Vieweg, Berlin-Lichterfelde 1930.
- Messe für Männerchor. Soli, Sopran, Alt, Tenor, Bass und Orchester Orgel ad libitum : op. 36. Gebr. Hug & Co, Leipzig 1930.
- Kleine Lustspiel-Suite : op. 37. Eulenburg, Leipzig 1930.
- Irreland. Opera. Grosses Haus am Domhof Osnabrück 1930.
- Fest auf Monbijou : Suite in fünf Sätzen für kleines Orchester; op. 50. Eulenburg, Leipzig 1933. Bonn 1933.
- Franzosenzeit. Opera. Premiere Mecklenburg State Theatre 1933.
- Die kleine Passion : Maria, unser Frauen, der träumet; Wk 56. W. Müller, Heidelberg 1957.

== Awards ==
Wunsch was awarded several music prizes. In 1925, he received the Schott Prize and the Prize of the City of Trier. His symphony Hammerwerk earned him the Franz Schubert Prize offered by the Leipzig publishing house Hug & Co. In 1928 he was awarded the Franz Schubert Prize for his V. Sinfonie at the 1928 International Columbia Graphophone Competition.
