= Robert Schumann Prize for Poetry and Music =

- Awarded for: "personalities with an outstanding lifetime achievement in the field of poetry and music"
- Sponsored by: Strecker Foundation
- Location: Mainz
- Country: Germany
- Presented by: Akademie der Wissenschaften und der Literatur
- Reward: €15,000
- First award: 2012
- Website: www.adwmainz.de/en/activities/awards-and-recognitions.html

The Robert Schumann Prize for Poetry and Music (German: Robert Schumann-Preis für Dichtung und Musik) Mainz is a classical music prize named after Robert Schumann, awarded biennially since 2012. The prize money is €15,000 (2012–2016: €25,000), donated by the Strecker Foundation, Mainz. The prize is awarded by the Akademie der Wissenschaften und der Literatur in Mainz, for "personalities with an outstanding lifetime achievement in the field of poetry and music".

== Recipients ==
- 2012 Pierre Boulez
- 2014 Wolfgang Rihm
- 2016 Aribert Reimann
- 2018 Jörg Widmann
- 2020 Olga Neuwirth
- 2022 Heinz Holliger
- 2024 Adriana Hölszky
- 2026 Pēteris Vasks
